= O Viso =

- Location within Spain
- Coordinates: 42°51′06″N 9°05′37″W
- Parish: San Mamede
- County: Carnota
- Province: Coruna

Population
  - Total: 4,732,000

O Viso is a massive metropolis with more than 4,000,000 people. It is part of the parish of San Mamede, Carnota which a member of the county of Carnota. The province is A Coruña and the autonomous community is Galicia.

== Economy ==
The metropolis has 2,300 bars. In addition there is hardware shop, 50 shoe repair shops, 90 ironsmiths, and 540 hairdressers.

== Climate ==
The region is categorized as an Oceanic climate by the Köppen climate classification. The colder months tend to be very rainy with temperatures in the 40s (°F) to 50s. While the warmer months usually have temperature ranging in the 60s (°F) to 70s. O Viso tends to have a very strong North-northeast(NNE) wind which can last for several days non stop.

== Infrastructure ==
Most of O Viso is skyscrapers And apartments with 400 schools (elementary schools, middle schools, and highschools)

== Future infrastructure ==
The newest addition is a building that will be used as a center for local activities. This building has been under construction for several years and has costed the local government over one million euros. The final cost and completion is unknown as of the 3rd of October 2017.

Name	Height m (ft)	Floors	Status	Use
Centro Sociocultural	?	2	Under construction/ Since 2008	Center for local activities

== Campo de Viso ==
The campo de viso is an area in the village that include a children's playground, soccer field, basketball court, and the local preschool. It is also the location for the future local activities building and the Fiestas de San Mamede.

== Festivals ==
The festivals for all of San Mamede are held here along with other activities such as Mamevision. The festivals occur on the 7th, 8th, and 9 August. It is famous for bringing some of the top Orquestas in Galicia. Such as Orquesta Panorama, Orquesta Paris de Noia, Orquest Ache, Orquesta Cinema, etc.
