= Operación Triunfo series 4 =

Operación Triunfo
- Series 4
- Hosted by: Jesús Vázquez
- Judges: Noemí Galera; Augusto Algueró; Javier Llano; Inma Serrano
- Winner: Sergio Rivero
- Runner-up: Soraya Arnelas
- Location: Parc Audiovisual de Catalunya, Terrassa, Barcelona

Release
- Original network: Telecinco
- Original release: 30 June – 13 October 2005

Series chronology
- ← Previous; Series 3 Next → Series 5

Operación Triunfo is a Spanish reality television music competition to find new singing talent. The fourth series, also known as Operación Triunfo 2005, was aired on Telecinco then La 1 refused a fourth series, from 30 July 2005 to 13 October 2005, presented by Jesús Vázquez.

Sergio Rivero was the winner of the series.

== Headmaster, judges and presenter ==
- Headmaster: Kike Santander
- Judges: Noemí Galera, Augusto Algueró, Javier Llano and Inma Serrano
- Presenter: Jesús Vázquez

== Contestants ==
Contestant	Age	Residence	Episode of elimination	Place finished
Sergio	19	Gran Canaria	Gala Final	Winner
Soraya	23	Valencia	Gala Final	Runner-up
Víctor	22	Barcelona	Gala Final	3rd
Idaira	20	San Cristóbal de La Laguna	Gala 14	4th
Fran	24	Granada	Gala 13	5th
Edurne	20	Madrid	Gala 12	6th
Lidia	20	Córdoba	Gala 11	7th
Sandra	17	Valencia	Gala 10	8th
Guille B.	26	Cádiz	Gala 9	9th
Guille M.	28	Valencia	Gala 8	10th
Mónica	21	Gijón	Gala 7	11th
Dani	28	Seville	Gala 6	12th
Héctor	16	Alicante	Gala 5	13th
Jesús	24	Puertollano	Gala 4	14th
Trizia	22	Seville	Gala 3	15th
Janina	20	Gran Canaria	Gala 2	16th
Migue	23	Cuenca	Gala 0	Not selected

== Galas ==
=== Results summary ===
Colour key

–	The contestant was the weekly public's favourite and was exempt from nominations
–	The contestant was up for elimination, but was saved by the academy staff
–	Contestant was up for the elimination but was saved by the contestants
–	Contestant was up for the elimination but was immediately saved by the public votes
-	The contestant was nominated to leave the Academy
–	The contestant was the winner of a duel

	Gala 0	Gala 1	Gala 2	Gala 3	Gala 4	Gala 5	Gala 6	Gala 7	Gala 8	Gala 9	Gala 10	Gala 11	Gala 12	Gala 13	Gala 14	Final
Sergio	Saved	Saved	Saved	Saved	Favourite	Favourite	Nominated	Favourite	Favourite	Favourite	Mark: 9	Finalist	Saved	Saved	Saved	Winner
Soraya	Saved	Saved	Saved	Nominated	Saved	Saved	Saved	Saved	Saved	Saved	Mark: 9.3	Finalist	Saved	Duel	Saved	Runner-up
Víctor	Saved	Saved	Favourite	Saved	Saved	Saved	Saved	Saved	Saved	Saved	Mark: 9.3	Finalist	Saved	Saved	Duel	3rd Place
Idaira	Saved	Saved	Nominated	Saved	Saved	Saved	Favourite	Saved	Nominated	Nominated	Mark: 6.2	Finalist	Saved	Saved	Eliminated	4th place
Fran	Saved	Saved	Saved	Saved	Saved	Saved	Saved	Saved	Nominated	Saved	Mark: 8.5	Finalist	Duel	Eliminated	5th place	
Edurne	Saved	Saved	Saved	Saved	Saved	Saved	Saved	Saved	Saved	Saved	Mark: 8.9	Finalist	Eliminated	6th place		
Lidia	Saved	Saved	Saved	Saved	Saved	Saved	Nominated	Saved	Saved	Nominated	Mark: 7.2	Eliminated				
Sandra	Saved	Saved	Saved	Favourite	Saved	Saved	Saved	Nominated	Saved	Nominated	Eliminated					
Guille. B.	Saved	Nominated	Saved	Saved	Nominated	Saved	Saved	Nominated	Nominated	Eliminated						
Guille. M.	Saved	Saved	Nominated	Saved	Saved	Nominated	Saved	Nominated	Eliminated							
Mónica	Saved	Saved	Saved	Saved	Saved	Nominated	Nominated	Eliminated								
Dani	Saved	Nominated	Saved	Saved	Nominated	Nominated	Eliminated									
Héctor	Saved	Saved	Saved	Nominated	Nominated	Eliminated										
Jesús	Saved	Favourite	Saved	Nominated	Eliminated											
Trizia	Saved	Saved	Nominated	Eliminated												
Janina	Saved	Nominated	Eliminated													
Migue	Eliminated															
Up for elimination	Janina; Migue; Trizia	Dani; Guille B. Héctor; Janina	Guille M. Idaira; Jesús; Trizia	Guille B. Héctor; Jesús; Soraya	Dani; Guille B. Héctor; Idaira	Dani; Guille M. Lidia; Mónica	Fran; Lidia; Mónica; Sergio	Guille B. Guille M. Lidia; Sandra	Fran; Guille B. Idaira; Sandra	Edurne; Idaira; Lidia; Sandra	Edurne; Fran; Idaira; Lidia	Against public vote	Edurne; Fran	Fran; Soraya	Idaira; Víctor	Sergio; Soraya; Víctor
Saved by Academy's staff	None	Guille B.	Guille M.	Soraya	Dani	Mónica	Sergio	Sandra	Fran	Lidia	Edurne	Winner	Fran; 59% to save	Soraya; 51.6% to save	Víctor; 74% to save	Sergio; 53% to win (out of 2)
Saved by contestants	None	Héctor; 7 of 13 votes to save	Jesús; 6* of 12 votes to save	Guille B. 4* of 11 votes to save	Idaira; 4* of 10 votes to save	Lidia; 5 of 9 votes to save	Fran; 6 of 8 votes to save	Lidia; 3* of 7 votes to save	Sandra; 5 of 6 votes to save	Edurne; 4 of 5 votes to save	Fran; 4 of 4 votes to save	Eliminated Finalist	Edurne; 41% to save	Fran; 48.4% to save	Idaira; 26% to save	Soraya; 47% to win (out of 2)
Saved by public vote	Trizia; 44% to save	Dani; 74% to save	Idaira; 84% to save	Héctor; 60% to save	Guille B. 70% to save	Guille M. 62% to save	Lidia; 59% to save	Guille B. 58% to save	Idaira; 59% to save	Idaira; 59% to save	Idaira; 59% to save	Eliminated Finalist	Edurne; 41% to save	Fran; 48.4% to save	Idaira; 26% to save	Soraya; 47% to win (out of 2)
Saved by public vote	Janina; 29% to save	Dani; 74% to save	Idaira; 84% to save	Héctor; 60% to save	Guille B. 70% to save	Guille M. 62% to save	Lidia; 59% to save	Guille B. 58% to save	Idaira; 59% to save	Idaira; 59% to save	Idaira; 59% to save	Eliminated Finalist	Edurne; 41% to save	Fran; 48.4% to save	Idaira; 26% to save	Víctor; Fewest votes to win (out of 3)
Eliminated	Migue; 27% to save	Janina; 26% to save	Trizia; 16% to save	Jesús; 40% to save	Héctor; 30% to save	Dani; 38% to save	Mónica. 41% to save	Guille M. 42% to save	Guille B. 41% to save	Sandra; 41% to save	Lidia; 41% to save	Eliminated Finalist	Edurne; 41% to save	Fran; 48.4% to save	Idaira; 26% to save	Víctor; Fewest votes to win (out of 3)
