= Nahuel Sachak =

Nahuel
- Born: 7 September 1991 (age 35); Guayaibí, Paraguay
- Genre: Latin pop
- Occupation: Singer
- Instrument: Vocals
- Years active: 2011–present

Nahuel Sachak (born in Colonia Luz Bella in Guayaibí, San Pedro Department, Paraguay in 1991), known mononymously as Nahuel, is a Paraguayan singer who, on the final held on 21 February 2011, became the winner of eighth season of Operación Triunfo in Spain.

== Biography ==
Nahuel who comes from a farming family was the first non-Spanish-born contestant to win the reality television talent competition Operación Triunfo, although he had been living in Spain since 2005. He emigrated to Spain with his mother Julia Chavez for economic reasons. He is also an avid sportsman and a football (soccer) player.

At present he performs around the world with his band Los Latinos Paraguayos on board cruise boats.

In 2022 he presents his álbum Mil noches, available at the moment in all digital platforms and he is on tour with his show throughout Spain.

== Discography ==
=== Singles ===
- 2011: En cualquier lugar
- 2011: Mientras te vas
- 2022: Dónde estás?

=== Collaborations ===
- 2016: ¿Dónde estás? duet with José Vera

=== Music videos ===
- 2011: Mientras te vas
- 2016: ¿Dónde estás? with José Vera
- 2022: Dónde estás? Single del Álbum Mil noches

Awards and achievements
Preceded by Mario Álvarez	Operación Triunfo Winner; Series 8	Succeeded by Amaia Romero
