= Te Encontraré =

Studio album by Idaira
- Released: November 18, 2006
- Recorded: 2006 in Madrid and Canary Islands, Spain
- Genre: Pop
- Length: 49:06
- Label: Multitrack, Cincomasmusic
- Producer: Pablo Cebrián & Ismael Guijarro

Alternative covers
- Alternative Cover

Te Encontraré (Spanish for: I Will Find You) is the first full-album by Spanish pop singer Idaira, released in 2006.

== Background ==
The album was produced by Pablo Cebrián and Ismael Guijarro, who in early 2006 published one of the best albums ever in the Spanish music business, "Círculo Vital".

Eleven tracks, one of them composed by Idaira entitled "Nada bueno en mí" (the song is about her bad experience through the reality show Operación Triunfo, in which she was the ugly duckling), another of the song is sung in acoustic version along her brother Airam, and it's a cover of the Dirty Dancing's soundtrack "(I've Had) The Time of My Life". It is of varied styles, with influences of Juanes, Julieta Venegas, and Corinne Bailey Rae

== Reception ==
Although it was one of the more hoped albums by a former Operación Triunfo participants, it did not have too much repercussion outside the Canary Islands. The album was praised by its excellent production, but it could not enter the PROMUSICAE list of 100 more sold albums in Spain.

Idaira was the most voted participant to win the show and the favourite of the public in almost every week.

== Track listing ==
1. "Enloquecida"
2. "Te Encontraré"
3. "Punto y Final"
4. "Lejos"
5. "Nada Bueno en Mí"
6. "Lo Siento"
7. "A Cada Paso"
8. "Tengo Que Decirte"
9. "Cuando Se Ama"
10. "The Time of My Life"
11. "Te Encontraré (remix)"
12. "Me Lo Dice El Mundo" (bonus track)

== See also ==
- Idaira
- Operación Triunfo
