= Dulce Hogar =

Studio album by Virginia Labuat
- Released: March 29, 2011
- Genre: Blues, Pop, Indie (music)
- Label: Sony Music
- Producer: Iñaki García, Virginia Maestro

Virginia Labuat chronology
Labuat (2009)	Dulce Hogar (2011)

Dulce Hogar is the second studio album by Virginia Maestro, after the release of Labuat. Released on March 29, 2011, it consists in a collection of fourteen songs completely written by herself, in both Spanish and English. According to some interviews the singer gave, the album is titled Dulce Hogar (Sweet Home), because she felt she was coming back to her roots as a singer-songwriter

and to the sound of her childhood.

It's the starting point for everything I always wanted to do: and that is writing my own songs. I feel it is very much my own. I had my eyes open during every part of the process, since we recorded the first note till we recorded the last. It hasn't been easy to get to here. For me it's a way to be at home. My home gave me musical influences since I was a little girl, my parents, the vinyl records... With Dulce Hogar I go back to my roots.

— Virginia Labuat

The first single was 'The Time is Now'. Both the single and its videoclip were released in February 2011. A special edition of the record contains an EP with a few rare songs, including 'Amanecer' (the Spanish version of 'Run to You'),'Bajo Mi Piel' (Spanish for 'Under My Skin') and 'Vuelve a Mi' (a song she wrote for a Spanish short movie in which she participated).

== Track listing ==
1. "Run to You"
2. "Por una vez"
3. "The Time Is Now"
4. "Hasta Dónde Iré"
5. "Te Doy Mi Voz"
6. "Insomnio (Insomnio Febril)"
7. "107 Veces"
8. "Hoy Por Ti"
9. "Tal Vez"
10. "I Call Your Name"
11. "Under My Skin (To Feel You Under My Skin)"
12. "Circus"
13. "Sin Corazón"
14. "Bonus Track: Liten y de Litin"
