= Evangelical Christian Academy =

Evangelical Christian Academy may refer to:

- Evangelical Christian Academy (Madrid, Spain), a school for missionaries’ children
- Evangelical Christian Academy (Colorado), a private school in the United States
- Evangelical Christian Academy (Guam), a school in Guam
- Evangelical Christian Academy, a private school in San Jose, Philippines
- Sucat Evangelical Christian Academy, a private secondary school in Parañaque, Philippines
