= Operación Triunfo (Spanish TV series) =

Spanish talent show

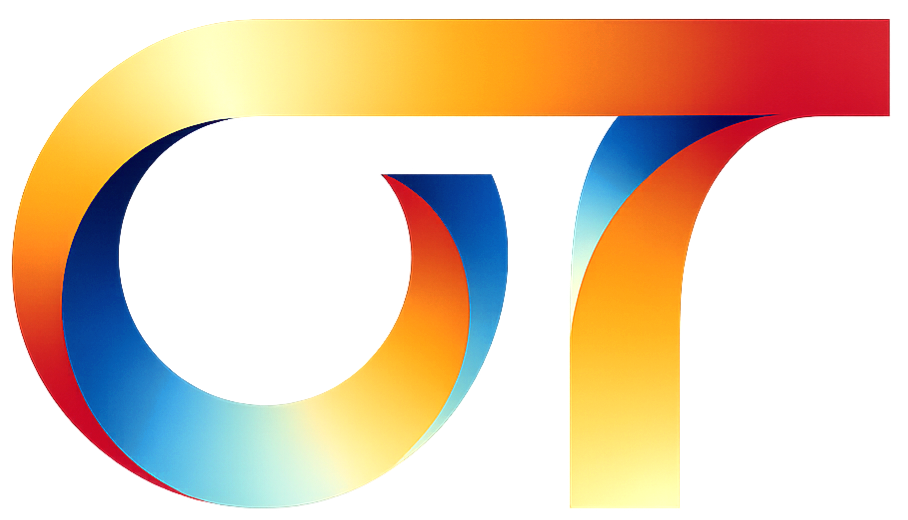
- Series 13 logo
- Created by: Toni Cruz; Josep Maria Mainat; Joan Ramon Mainat
- Presented by: Carlos Lozano (2001–2004); Jesús Vázquez (2005–2009); Pilar Rubio (2011); Roberto Leal (2017–2020); Chenoa (2023–)
- Country of origin: Spain
- Original language: Spanish
- No. of series: 13

Production
- Running time: 160–180 minutes
- Production company: Gestmusic Endemol

Original release
- Network: La 1
- Release: 22 October 2001 – 28 January 2004
- Network: Telecinco
- Release: 30 June 2005 – 20 February 2011
- Network: La 1
- Release: 23 October 2017 – 10 June 2020
- Network: Amazon Prime Video
- Release: 20 November 2023 – present

Operación Triunfo (transl. 'Operation Triumph') is a reality television talent show which first aired on Televisión Española (TVE) in 2001 in Spain. A music talent contest with viewer voting and reality show elements that originated Endemol's Star Academy franchise, the show aims to find the country's next solo singing sensation.

Operación Triunfo (also known as OT) first aired in 2001. On its first run between 2001 and 2004, three series were aired on TVE, which also served as the national final to select the Spanish entry for the Eurovision Song Contest. The first series of OT was particularly successful in ratings, becoming one of the most popular shows in the history of Spanish television and featuring singers that went on to enjoy long-term recognition from the public: notably Rosa López, David Bisbal, David Bustamante, and Chenoa. After the third series, TVE decided not to renew the show and its rights were acquired by Telecinco, which aired series 5–8 of the series. Series 8 in 2011 was cancelled due to poor ratings and its finale was rushed as a result.

On 26 April 2017, RTVE approved a new series of the talent show produced by Gestmusic Endemol, returning to TVE after 13 years. The total cost of the series was €10.2 million. Due to its ratings success, it was renewed for a further series. This was the second most successful edition of the program to date, artists like Aitana, Ana Guerra, Amaia, Alfred García, Luis Cepeda, Agoney, Miriam Rodríguez, or Lola Índigo have emerged from this edition.

In 2023, Amazon Prime Video acquired the rights to air the twelfth series. Shortly after the conclusion of this series, it was announced that Amazon had picked up the show for a thirteenth season. It premiered in September 2025 and concluded in December of the same year. In June 2026, Amazon confirmed a fourteenth season, at the time slated to start in October 2027, with auditions taking place in June 2027.

== Format ==
A selection of hopefuls is boarded in "The Academy", managed by a headmaster, where they are coached by various professionals in several artistic disciplines and are filmed with cameras (an idea borrowed from another of Endemol's major reality shows Big Brother). Once a week, the contestants have to face a prime time show, where they sing a cover version of a popular song they have prepared during the week before, as well as recapping their trials and tribulations at The Academy from the past week. The live show will often feature special guest stars, with whom some of the contestants have the opportunity to sing. Based on the judges' verdicts and viewer voting, the weakest contestant is dropped. The eventual winner is awarded a record deal and/or some amount of money.

== Series overview ==
Series	Year	Winner	Runner-up	Third place	Fourth place	Fifth place	Sixth place	Host	Headmaster	Network
1	2001–02	Rosa López	David Bisbal	David Bustamante	Chenoa	Manu Tenorio	Verónica Romero	Carlos Lozano	Nina	La Primera
2	2002–03	Ainhoa Cantalapiedra	Manuel Carrasco	Beth Rodergas	Miguel Nández	Hugo Salazar	Joan Tena	Carlos Lozano	Nina	La Primera
3	2003–04	Vicente Seguí	Ramón del Castillo	Miguel Cadenas	Davinia Cuevas	Mario Martínez	Leticia Pérez	Carlos Lozano	Nina	La Primera
4	2005	Sergio Rivero	Soraya Arnelas	Víctor Estévez	Idaira	Fran Dieli	Edurne	Jesús Vázquez	Kike Santander	Telecinco
5	2006–07	Lorena Gómez	Daniel Zueras	Leo Segarra	Saray Ramírez	Moritz Weisskopf	José Galisteo	Jesús Vázquez	Kike Santander	Telecinco
6	2008	Virginia Maestro	Pablo López	Chipper Cooke	Manu Castellano	Sandra Criado	Mimi Segura	Jesús Vázquez	Àngel Llàcer	Telecinco
7	2009	Mario Álvarez	Brenda Mau	Jon Allende	Ángel Capel	Patricia Navarro	Sylvia Parejo	Jesús Vázquez	Àngel Llàcer	Telecinco
8	2011	Nahuel Sachak	Álex Forriols	Mario Jefferson	Alexandra Masangkay	Niccó	Josh Prada	Pilar Rubio	Nina	Telecinco
9	2017–18	Amaia Romero	Aitana Ocaña	Miriam Rodríguez	Alfred García	Ana Guerra	Agoney Hernández	Roberto Leal	Noemí Galera	La 1
10	2018	Famous Oberogo	Alba Reche	Natalia Lacunza	Sabela Ramil	Julia Medina	Miki Núñez	Roberto Leal	Noemí Galera	La 1
11	2020	Nia Correia	Flavio Fernández	Eva Barreiro	Anaju Calavia	Hugo Cobo	Maialen Gurbindo	Roberto Leal	Noemí Galera	La 1
12	2023–24	Naiara Moreno	Paul Thin	Ruslana Panchyshyna	Juanjo Bona	Lucas Curotto	Martin Urrutia	Chenoa	Noemí Galera	Amazon Prime Video
13	2025	Cristina Lora	Olivia Bay	Tinho Vaamonde	Guille Toledano	Claudia Arenas	Guillo Rist	Chenoa	Noemí Galera	Amazon Prime Video
14	2027	Upcoming season						Chenoa	TBA	Amazon Prime Video

All contestants appearing above (1st to 6th) were born in Spain, except for Chenoa who is Argentinian-born (from series 1), Moritz Weisskopf who is German (series 5), Chipper Cooke who is from the United States (series 6), Brenda Mau who is from Peru (series 7), Alexandra Masangkay who is from the Philippines (series 8), winner of series 8 Nahuel Sachak who is from Paraguay, winner of series 10 Famous Oberogo who is Dutch-born, Lucas Curotto who is from Uruguay (series 12) and Ruslana Panchyshyna who is from Ukraine (series 12).

=== Series 1 (2001–02) ===
All three finalists of the inaugural series released debut albums, but while Rosa (accompanied by some fellow contenders as backing singers) scored seventh place in the Eurovision Song Contest 2002 with the song "Europe's Living a Celebration", and had notable success with her albums, it was Bisbal who went on to international success, even winning a Latin Grammy Award for Best Newcomer for his album Corazón Latino.

Other participants of this first edition (Chenoa, Nuria Fergó and Manu Tenorio) also launched successful solo careers. In addition, Gisela was hired by Disney Spain and started a career in musical theater; and represented Andorra in the Eurovision Song Contest 2008.

Contestant	Age	Residence	Episode of elimination	Place finished
Rosa	20	Armilla	Gala Final	Winner
Bisbal	22	Almería	Gala Final	Runner-up
Bustamante	19	San Vicente de la Barquera	Gala Final	3rd
Chenoa	26	Palma	Gala Final	4th
Manu	26	Seville	Gala Final	5th
Verónica	23	Elche	Gala Final	6th
Nuria	22	Nerja	Gala 13	7th
Gisela	22	El Bruc	Gala 12	8th
Naím	21	Premià de Mar	Gala 11	9th
Àlex	20	Vilassar de Mar	Gala 5 / Gala 10	10th
Alejandro	23	Valencia	Gala 8	11th
Juan	28	Laredo	Gala 7	12th
Natalia	18	Sanlúcar de Barrameda	Gala 6	13th
Javián	27	Dos Hermanas	Gala 4	14th
Mireia	19	Vila-seca	Gala 3	15th
Geno	19	Gran Canaria	Gala 2	16th

=== Series 2 (2002–03) ===
The second series of Operación Triunfo became an anomaly in the category of popular reality TV music shows. First of all, the winner had very little success after the show. Second of all, many contestants who did not do well had massive success across Europe and Latin America, not just in Spain:

Beth was chosen to represent Spain in the Eurovision Song Contest 2003. She scored 8th place with the song "Dime".

The first person out of the show, Mai Meneses, rose to prominence in 2006 when herself and a childhood friend formed the band Nena Daconte. They released an album, He Perdido Los Zapatos, which was highly praised by critics. The album sold over 200,000 copies in Spain alone, an amazing feat as an average album to get to number 1 in Spain needs around 20,000 sales.

Vega, who came 9th, managed to release the best selling single of 2003 in Spain with her own composition, "iGrita!", with over one million copies sold.

Contestant	Age	Residence	Episode of elimination	Place finished
Ainhoa	22	Galdakao	Gala Final	Winner
Manuel	21	Isla Cristina	Gala Final	Runner-up
Beth	20	Súria	Gala Final	3rd
Nández	24	Cádiz	Gala Final	4th
Hugo	24	Seville	Gala Final	5th
Joan	25	Barcelona	Gala Final	6th
Tony	21	Tenerife	Gala 13	7th
Nika	22	Torrejón de Ardoz	Gala 12	8th
Vega	23	Córdoba	Gala 11	9th
Danni	20	Jaén	Gala 10	10th
Elena	19	Barcelona	Gala 9	11th
Tessa	20	Valencia	Gala 8	12th
Marey	18	Cádiz	Gala 7	13th
Cristie	24	Fuengirola	Gala 6	14th
Enrique	27	Navarra	Gala 5	15th
Miguel	25	Ibiza	Gala 4	16th
Mai	24	Madrid	Gala 3	17th
Saray	18	Alicante	Gala 0	Not selected
Marcos	26	Barcelona	Gala 0	Not selected
Jano	25	Palma	Gala 0	Not selected

=== Series 3 (2003–04) ===
Series three runner-up Ramón was chosen to represent Spain in the Eurovision Song Contest 2004. He scored 10th place with the song "Para llenarme de ti".

This was the last series aired by TVE until 2017, and the one with the lowest ratings until 2011.

Contestant	Age	Residence	Episode of elimination	Place finished
Vicente	24	Vilamarxant	Gala Final	Winner
Ramón	19	Gran Canaria	Gala Final	Runner-up
Miguel	22	Huelva	Gala Final	3rd
Davinia	18	Cádiz	Gala Final	4th
Mario	19	Zaragoza	Gala Final	5th
Leticia	26	Seville	Gala Final	6th
Noelia	18	Lugo	Gala 11	7th
Beatriz	18	Pontevedra	Gala 10	8th (Quit)
Nur	20	Barcelona	Gala 10	9th
Borja	19	Madrid	Gala 9	10th
Israel	23	Murcia	Gala 8	11th
Jorge	25	Zaragoza	Gala 7	12th
Sonia	29	Barcelona	Gala 6	13th
Miriam	22	Pontevedra	Gala 5	14th
José	25	Castellón de la Plana	Gala 4	15th
Sonny	23	Madrid	Gala 3	16th
Isabel	20	Cádiz	Gala 2	17th

=== Series 4 (2005) ===
TVE refused a fourth series, choosing to select its Eurovision Song Contest entry using a multi-artist national final. The show was then offered to Telecinco, who bought its rights. This fourth series started airing in June 2005 and got better ratings than the third one, but it never reached the results that the first series achieved. Runner-up Soraya Arnelas would represent Spain at the Eurovision Song Contest 2009 and sixth-placed Edurne would represent Spain at the Eurovision Song Contest 2015.

Contestant	Age	Residence	Episode of elimination	Place finished
Sergio	19	Gran Canaria	Gala Final	Winner
Soraya	23	Valencia	Gala Final	Runner-up
Víctor	22	Barcelona	Gala Final	3rd
Idaira	20	San Cristóbal de La Laguna	Gala 14	4th
Fran	24	Granada	Gala 13	5th
Edurne	20	Madrid	Gala 12	6th
Lidia	20	Córdoba	Gala 11	7th
Sandra	17	Valencia	Gala 10	8th
Guille B.	26	Cádiz	Gala 9	9th
Guille M.	28	Valencia	Gala 8	10th
Mónica	21	Gijón	Gala 7	11th
Dani	28	Seville	Gala 6	12th
Héctor	16	Alicante	Gala 5	13th
Jesús	24	Puertollano	Gala 4	14th
Trizia	22	Seville	Gala 3	15th
Janina	20	Gran Canaria	Gala 2	16th
Migue	23	Cuenca	Gala 0	Not selected

=== Series 5 (2006–07) ===
Telecinco announced in May 2006 that the fifth series of the program was to be released in October 2006.

In July, 25 Telecinco aired a special show titled Operación Triunfo 2006: Otra Vez en Marcha. In this show some former OT artists (among them, Rosa, Soraya Arnelas, Sergio Rivero, Natalia, Beth) performed and the new selection of contestants was introduced.

The fifth series started on Sunday 8 October 2006 with 18 finalists, but two finalists had to leave and they didn't enter the academy. It created some controversy as one of the first two people out that night was the first black person, Claritzel, ever to be on the show (she had to pull out of the previous year's show). She had to leave the show because of a heart intervention.

Contestant	Age	Residence	Episode of elimination	Place finished
Lorena	20	Lleida	Gala Final	Winner
Daniel	26	Zaragoza	Gala Final	Runner-up
Leo	25	Valencia	Gala 15	3rd
Saray	25	Tuineje	Gala 14	4th
Mortiz	29	Málaga	Gala 13	5th
José	28	Viladecans	Gala 12	6th
Ismael	18	Mataró	Gala 11	7th
Jorge	18	Villarejo de Salvanés	Gala 10	8th
Eva	26	Vigo	Gala 9	9th
Vanessa	28	Bigues i Riells	Gala 8	10th
Mayte	22	Murcia	Gala 7	11th
Mercedes	24	Chiclana	Gala 6	12th
Cristina	16	Cuenca	Gala 5	13th
José Antonio	22	Mérida	Gala 4	14th
Xavier	20	Vinaròs	Gala 3	15th
Encarna	22	Almería	Gala 2	16th
Claritzell	24	Tenerife	Gala 0	Not selected
Melissa	18	San Miguel de Salinas	Gala 0	Not selected

=== Series 6 (2008) ===
Castings started in Barcelona for the new series on 18 February 2008. The sixth series began on 8 April 2008, with 18 candidates to enter the academy (two of them didn't). This series has been the most controversial because many critics pointed that the series centered more on the reality show aspect than on the contestants' performing talent. Runner-up Pablo López went on to launch a successful recording career in 2014.

Contestant	Age	Residence	Episode of elimination	Place finished
Virginia	25	Jaén	Gala Final	Winner
Pablo	24	Málaga	Gala Final	Runner-up
Chipper	34	New York City	Gala Final	3rd
Manu	17	Córdoba	Gala 14	4th
Sandra	24	Córdoba	Gala 13	5th
Mimi	26	Melilla	Gala 12	6th
Iván	24	Madrid	Gala 11	7th
Noelia	23	Valencia	Gala 10	8th
Anabel	22	Córdoba	Gala 9	9th
Tania S.	18	Seville	Gala 8	10th
Reke	22	Murcia	Gala 7	11th
Esther	20	Málaga	Gala 6	12th
Tania G.	25	Barcelona	Gala 5	13th
Rubén	21	Barcelona	Gala 4	14th
Paula	23	Seville	Gala 3	15th
Ros	16	Barcelona	Gala 2	16th
Patty	24	Santander	Gala 1	17th (Quit)
Jorge	23	Valencia	Gala 0	Not selected
Juanjo	28	Murcia	Gala 0	Not selected

=== Series 7 (2009) ===
The castings were made in March and April 2009 in all Spain. The first gala from OT 2009 was televised on 29 April 2009. Once again, Risto Mejide was a part of the jury panel, along with Noemí Galera, Coco Comín and Ramoncín.

Contestant	Age	Residence	Episode of elimination	Place finished
Mario	23	Oviedo	Gala Final	Winner
Brenda	20	Barcelona	Gala Final	Runner-up
Jon	23	Baracaldo	Gala Final	3rd
Ángel	22	Albox	Gala 12	4th
Patricia	21	Leganés	Gala 12	5th
Silvia	17	Barcelona	Gala 11	6th
Cristina	16	Marbella	Gala 10	7th
Samuel	19	La Cañada de San Urbano	Gala 9	8th
Rafa	21	Vall de Uxó	Gala 9	9th
Alba Lucía	18	Murcia	Gala 8	10th
Elías	22	Almendralejo	Gala 7	11th
Diana	20	Burgos	Gala 6	12th
Maxi	25	Reus	Gala 5	13th
Nazaret	19	Camarma de Esteruelas	Gala 4	14th
Pedro	20	Jerez de la Frontera	Gala 3	15th
Guadiana	22	Badajoz	Gala 2	16th
Púa	18	Sant Vicents dels Horts	Gala 1	17th
Patty	26	Barrio de las Letras	Gala 1	18th

=== Series 8 (2011) ===
This was the last series aired by Telecinco. The show was cancelled after 35 days due to poor ratings. It ended with a rushed finale featuring contestants from previous series. Despite the low ratings, fans of the show made the Twitter hashtag #VivaOT, which went on to be the highest trending topic during the airing of the finale.

Contestant	Age	Residence	Episode of elimination	Place finished
Nahuel	19	Castelló	Gala Final	Winner
Álex	26	Valencia	Gala Final	Runner-up
Jefferson	19	Fuengirola	Gala Final	3rd
Alexandra	19	Barcelona	Gala Final	4th
Niccó	20	Tenerife	Gala Final	5th
Josh	27	Melilla	Gala Final	6th
Roxio	21	Madrid	Gala Final	7th
Naxxo	26	Barcelona	Gala Final	8th
Coraluna	21	Jaén	Gala Final	9th
Nirah	28	Barcelona	Gala Final	10th
Juan	24	Barcelona	Gala Final	11th
Moneiba	28	Gran Canaria	Gala Final	12th
Geno	29	Gran Canaria	Gala Final	13th
Enrique Ramil	28	Ares	Gala 3	14th
Charlie	17	Tenerife	Gala 2	15th
Silvia	20	Jaén	Gala 1	16th
Sira	19	Tenerife	Gala 1	17th
Alexxa	20	Gijón	Gala 0	Not selected
Miguel	26	Almería	Gala 0	Not selected

=== Series 9 (2017–18) ===
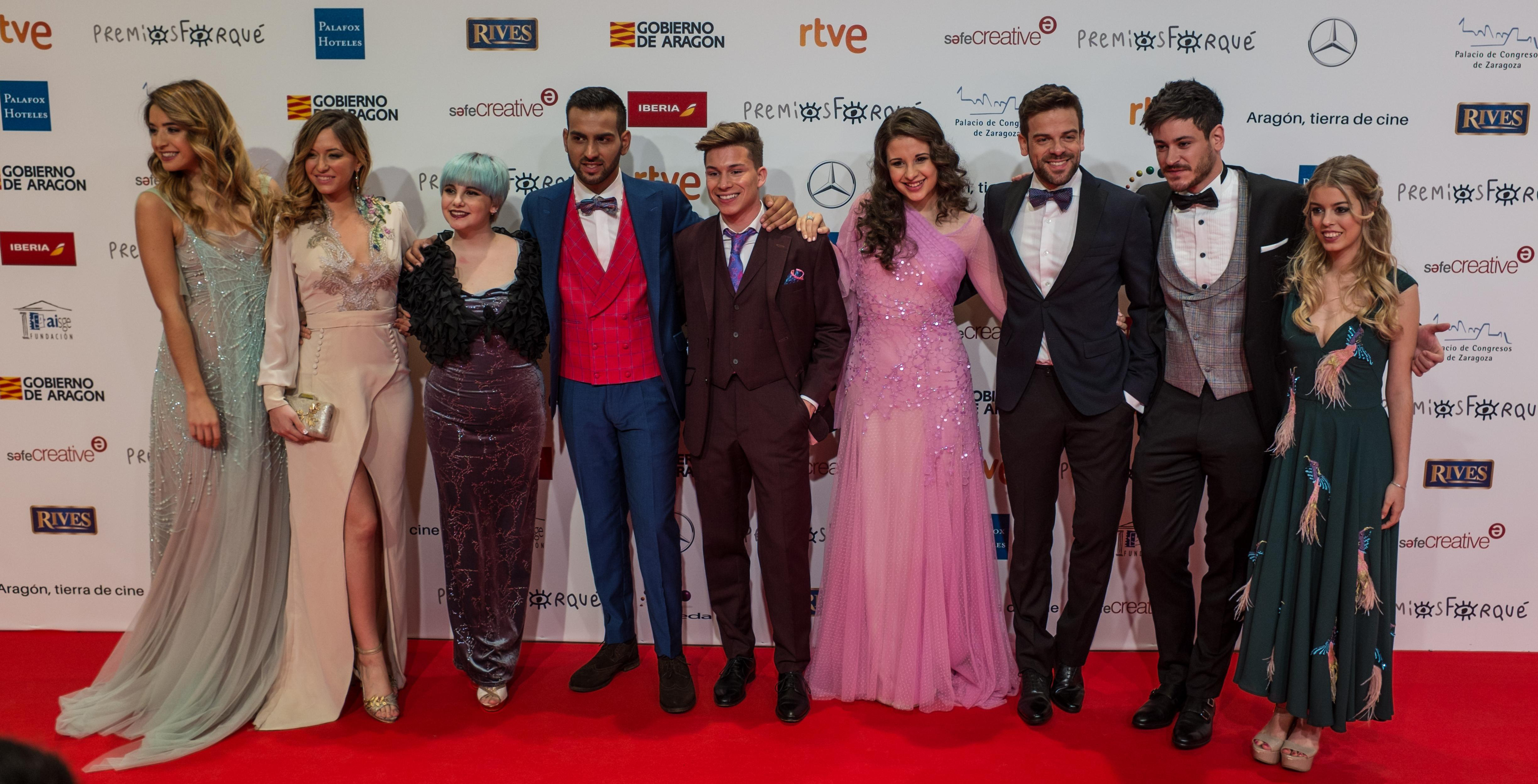
Some of the contestants of Operación Triunfo 2017 at the Premios Forqué 2018.

Six years after the show was discontinued and thirteen years after it last aired on TVE, RTVE approved to revive the contest. The total cost of the new series was €10,2 million. Casting auditions for the ninth series were held from 14 June 2017 to 18 July 2017 in Barcelona, Las Palmas, Palma, Valencia, Santiago de Compostela, Bilbao, Granada, Seville, and Madrid. The minimum age to compete was raised to 18. On 18 July 2017, Noemí Galera, a member of the jury panel on previous series, was announced as the new "headmaster" of the Academy. On 28 August 2017, it was revealed that the jury panel would consists of singer, songwriter and producer Mónica Naranjo, marketing director Joe Pérez-Orive and music executive and producer Manuel Martos, who would be accompanied every week by a fourth guest juror. On 30 August 2017, Roberto Leal was announced as the new host. The series premiered on 23 October 2017. The final took place on 5 February 2018, and Amaia Romero was announced the winner. In addition, Amaia and Alfred were selected to represent Spain in the Eurovision Song Contest 2018 with "Tu canción", and finished in twenty-third place out of 26 countries.

Contestant	Age	Residence	Episode of elimination	Place finished
Amaia	19	Pamplona	Gala Final	Winner
Aitana	18	Sant Climent de Llobregat	Gala Final	Runner-up
Miriam	21	Pontedeume	Gala Final	3rd
Alfred	20	El Prat de Llobregat	Gala Final	4th
Ana Guerra	23	San Cristóbal de La Laguna	Gala Final	5th
Agoney	21	Adeje	Gala 12	6th
Roi	24	Santiago de Compostela	Gala 11	7th
Nerea	18	Gavá	Gala 10	8th
Cepeda	28	Ourense	Gala 9	9th
Raoul	20	Montgat	Gala 8	10th
Mireya	20	Alhaurín de la Torre	Gala 7	11th
Ricky	31	Palma	Gala 6	12th
Marina	19	Dos Hermanas	Gala 5	13th
Thalía	18	Malpartida de Plasencia	Gala 4	14th
Juan Antonio	23	Bilbao	Gala 3	15th
Mimi	25	Huétor-Tájar	Gala 2	16th
João	21	Madrid	Gala 0	Not selected
Mario	21	Madrid	Gala 0	Not selected

=== Series 10 (2018) ===
On 28 February 2018, RTVE's Governing Board approved the renewal of Operación Triunfo for a tenth series. Casting auditions for the tenth series were held from 30 May 2018 to 10 July 2018 in Barcelona, Alicante, Valencia, Mallorca, San Sebastián, Vigo, Tenerife, Málaga, Seville and Madrid. The series premiered on 19 September 2018 and ended on 19 December 2018.

The 18 contestants that appeared on the introduction live show or Gala 0 were announced on 14 September 2018.

Contestant	Age	Residence	Episode of elimination	Place finished
Famous	19	Bormujos	Gala Final	Winner
Alba Reche	21	Elche	Gala Final	Runner-up
Natalia	19	Pamplona	Gala Final	3rd
Sabela	24	As Pontes de García Rodríguez	Gala Final	4th
Julia	23	San Fernando	Gala Final	5th
Miki	22	Terrassa	Gala 12	6th
Marta	18	Torre del Mar	Gala 11	7th
María	26	Madrid	Gala 10	8th
Marilia	18	Gáldar	Gala 9	9th
Carlos Right	25	Esplugues de Llobregat	Gala 8	10th
Noelia	22	Málaga	Gala 7	11th
Damion	21	Adeje	Gala 6	12th
Dave	20	Sanlúcar de Barrameda	Gala 5	13th
Joan Garrido	22	Bunyola	Gala 4	14th
África	22	Madrid	Gala 3	15th
Alfonso	22	Madrid	Gala 2	16th
Rodrigo	25	San Juan del Puerto	Gala 0	Not selected
Luis	19	El Masnou	Gala 0	Not selected

As in the previous season, the series served as the platform to select the Spanish entry at the Eurovision Song Contest 2019. A special live show was held on 20 January 2019 to select the Spanish entrant and song for Eurovision.

=== Series 11 (2020) ===
In January 2019, TVE confirmed an eleventh series. Casting auditions for the eleventh series were held from 7 October 2019 to 6 November 2019 in Barcelona, Las Palmas, Valencia, Palma, Málaga, Seville, Bilbao, Santiago de Compostela and Madrid. The series premiered on 12 January 2020.

Contestant	Age	Residence	Episode of elimination	Place finished
Nía	26	Las Palmas	Gala Final	Winner
Flavio	19	Murcia	Gala Final	Runner-up
Eva	19	Sada	Gala Final	3rd
Anaju	26	Alcañiz	Gala Final	4th
Hugo	20	Córdoba	Gala Final	5th
Maialen	25	Pamplona	Gala 12	6th
Samantha	25	Beniarrés	Gala 12	7th
Bruno	25	Alcalá de Henares	Gala 11	8th
Gèrard	20	Ceuta	Gala 10	9th
Jesús	24	Barbate	Gala 8	10th
Rafa	23	Adamuz	Gala 7	11th
Anne	18	Pamplona	Gala 6	12th
Javy	21	Barbate	Gala 5	13th
Nick	19	Sant Cugat del Vallès	Gala 4	14th
Eli	19	Las Palmas	Gala 3	15th
Ariadna	18	Sant Joan Despí	Gala 2	16th
Valery	22	Elche	Gala 0	Not selected
Adri	23	Palma	Gala 0	Not selected

=== Series 12 (2023–24) ===
Three years after it last aired in TVE, Amazon Prime Video acquired the rights to air the series. On 27 May 2023, series one contestant Chenoa was announced as the host. Casting auditions were held from 3 July 2023 to 19 September 2023 in Barcelona, Zaragoza, Santiago de Compostela, Bilbao, Valencia, Las Palmas, Málaga, Seville and Madrid. The series premiered on 20 November 2023.

Contestant	Age	Residence	Episode of elimination	Place finished
Naiara	26	Zaragoza	Gala Final	Winner
Paul	20	Armilla	Gala Final	Runner-up
Ruslana	18	Madrid	Gala Final	3rd
Juanjo	20	Magallón	Gala Final	4th
Lucas	23	Vallirana	Gala Final	5th
Martin	18	Getxo	Gala Final	6th
Bea	19	San Fernando de Henares	Gala 11	7th
Chiara	19	Ciutadella de Menorca	Gala 10	8th
Álvaro	21	Seville	Gala 9	9th
Cris	24	San Cristóbal de La Laguna	Gala 8	10th
Violeta	22	Motril	Gala 7	11th
Alex	24	Córdoba	Gala 6	12th
Salma	20	Mijas	Gala 5	13th
Denna	22	Ogíjares	Gala 4	14th
Omar	26	Yunquera de Henares	Gala 3	15th
Suzete	22	Santa Cruz de Tenerife	Gala 2	16th
Lina de Sol	20	Vigo	Gala 0	Not selected
Edu	26	Santa Cruz de Tenerife	Gala 0	Not selected

=== Series 13 (2025) ===
The thirteenth series, the second to air on Amazon Prime Video, premiered on 15 September 2025.

Contestant	Age	Residence	Episode of elimination	Place finished
Cristina	19	Seville	Gala Final	Winner
Olivia	19	Madrid	Gala Final	Runner-up
Tinho	21	A Coruña	Gala Final	3rd
Guille Toledano	24	Cabanillas del Campo	Gala Final	4th
Claudia Arenas	19	Alicante	Gala Final	5th
Guillo Rist	23	Matadepera	Gala 12	6th
Crespo	21	Lucena	Gala 11	7th
Téyou	28	Santander	Gala 10	8th
Lucía Casani	19	Valencia	Gala 9	9th
María Cruz	24	Las Palmas	Gala 8	10th
Laura Muñoz	20	Pamplona	Gala 7	11th
Max	22	Premià de Mar	Gala 6	12th
Judit	20	Barcelona	Gala 5	13th
Carlos	23	Palma de Mallorca	Gala 4	14th
Salma de Diego	19	Benidorm	Gala 3	15th
Iván Rojo	23	Valladolid	Gala 2	16th
Quique	21	Madrid	Gala 0	Not selected
Sam	29	Las Palmas	Gala 0	Not selected

== See also ==
- La Academia
- Fame Academy
- Objetivo Fama
- Star Academy
- Star Académie
- Star Factory
