= Operación Triunfo series 7 =

Operación Triunfo
- Series 7
- Hosted by: Jesús Vázquez
- Judges: Noemí Galera; Risto Mejide; Ramoncín; Coco Comín
- Winner: Mario Álvarez
- Runner-up: Brenda Mau
- Location: Parc Audiovisual de Catalunya, Terrassa, Barcelona

Release
- Original network: Telecinco
- Original release: 29 April – 21 July 2009

Series chronology
- ← Previous; Series 6 Next → Series 8

Operación Triunfo is a Spanish reality television music competition to find new singing talent. The seventh series, also known as Operación Triunfo 2009, aired on Telecinco from 29 April 2009 to 21 July 2009, presented by Jesús Vázquez.

Mario Álvarez was the winner of the series.

== Auditions ==
Open casting auditions were held in a number of locations:

- Oviedo: NH Principado – 10 March 2009
- Las Palmas (Las Palmas de Gran Canaria): NH Imperial Playa – 11 March 2009
- Barcelona: Teatro Tívoli – 16 March 2009
- Palma, Majorca: Melia Palas Atenea – 18 March 2009
- Málaga: Hotel NH Málaga – 19 March 2009
- Santiago de Compostela: Hotel Hesperia Peregrino – 24 March 2009
- Bilbao: Teatro Ayala – 26 March 2009
- Valencia: Teatro Olympia – 30 March 2009
- Seville: Teatro Central – 3 April 2009
- Madrid: Teatro Lope de Vega – 6 April 2009

There were also casting based on online presentations by contestants who couldn't attend any of the above sessions

== Headmaster, judges and presenter ==
- Headmaster: Àngel Llàcer
- Judges: Noemí Galera, Risto Mejide, Ramoncín and Coco Comín
- Presenter: Jesús Vázquez

== Contestants ==
Contestant	Age	Residence	Episode of elimination	Place finished
Mario	23	Oviedo	Gala Final	Winner
Brenda	20	Barcelona	Gala Final	Runner-up
Jon	23	Baracaldo	Gala Final	3rd
Ángel	22	Albox	Gala 12	4th
Patricia	21	Leganés	Gala 12	5th
Silvia	17	Barcelona	Gala 11	6th
Cristina	16	Marbella	Gala 10	7th
Samuel	19	La Cañada de San Urbano	Gala 9	8th
Rafa	21	Vall de Uxó	Gala 9	9th
Alba Lucía	18	Murcia	Gala 8	10th
Elías	22	Almendralejo	Gala 7	11th
Diana	20	Burgos	Gala 6	12th
Maxi	25	Reus	Gala 5	13th
Nazaret	19	Camarma de Esteruelas	Gala 4	14th
Pedro	20	Jerez de la Frontera	Gala 3	15th
Guadiana	22	Badajoz	Gala 2	16th
Púa	18	Sant Vicents dels Horts	Gala 1	17th
Patty	26	Barrio de las Letras	Gala 1	18th

== Galas ==
=== Results summary ===
Colour key

–	Contestant received the most public votes and was exempt for nominations.
–	Contestant was up for the elimination but was saved by the Academy's staff.
–	Contestant was up for the elimination but was saved by the contestants.
–	Contestants were up for the elimination and were the nominees of the week.
–	Contestant was up for the elimination but was immediately saved by the public votes.
–	Contestant was up for the elimination but was immediately eliminated by the public votes.

	Gala 0	Gala 1	Gala 2	Gala 3	Gala 4	Gala 5	Gala 6	Gala 7	Gala 8	Gala 9		Gala 10	Gala 11	Gala 12		Final
Mario	Maxi	Jon	Jon	Jon	Rafa	Diana	Saved	Ángel	Mark: 7	Finalist	Saved	Saved	Saved	Saved	Saved	Winner (Final)
Brenda	Maxi	Guadiana	Elías	Elías	Maxi	Diana	Jon	Ángel	Mark: 8.9	Finalist	Saved	Saved	Saved	Saved	Saved	Runner-up (Final)
Jon	Púa	Nominated	Saved	Nominated	Diana	Diana	Nominated	Ángel	Mark: 5	Finalist	Saved	Saved	Saved	Saved	Saved	3rd Place (Final)
Ángel	Púa	Elías	Jon	Jon	Maxi	Alba	Mario	Saved	Mark: 5.4	Finalist	Saved	Saved	Saved	Saved	Eliminated	4th place (Gala 12)
Patricia	Patty	Jon	Jon	Nazaret	Diana	Alba	Mario	Alba	Mark: 6.3	Finalist	Saved	Saved	Saved	Eliminated	5th place (Gala 12)	
Silvia	Maxi	Guadiana	Jon	Nazaret	Maxi	Alba	Mario	Ángel	Mark: 7.4	Finalist	Saved	Saved	Eliminated	6th place (Gala 11)		
Cristina	Maxi	Elías	Elías	Elías	Rafa	Elías	Mario	Alba	Mark: 6.5	Finalist	Saved	Eliminated	7th place (Gala 10)			
Samuel	Maxi	Elías	Pedro	Jon	Rafa	Alba	Mario	Ángel	Mark: 6.4	Finalist	Eliminated	8th place (Gala 9)				
Rafa	Púa	Elías	Elías	Elías	Saved	Alba	Mario	Nominated	Mark: 5.4	Evicted (Gala 9)						
Alba Lucía	Elías	Elías	Elías	Elías	Rafa	Saved	Mario	Nominated	Evicted (Gala 8)							
Elías	Nominated	Saved	Nominated	Saved	Rafa	Nominated	Nominated	Evicted (Gala 7)								
Diana	Elías	Guadiana	Jon	Nazaret	Nominated	Nominated	Evicted (Gala 6)									
Maxi	Saved	Guadiana	Pedro	Jon	Nominated	Evicted (Gala 5)										
Nazaret	Patty	Guadiana	Jon	Nominated	Evicted (Gala 4)											
Pedro	Maxi	Jon	Nominated	Evicted (Gala 3)												
Guadiana	Elías	Nominated	Evicted (Gala 2)													
Púa	Nominated	Evicted (Gala 1)														
Patty	Nominated	Evicted (Gala 1)														
Up for elimination	Elías; Jon; Maxi; Patty; Púa	Diana; Elías; Guadiana; Jon	Elías; Jon; Pedro; Samuel	Elías; Jon; Patricia; Nazaret	Alba Lucía; Diana; Maxi; Rafa	Alba Lucía; Diana; Elías; Rafa	Brenda; Elías; Jon; Mario	Alba Lucía; Ángel; Cristina; Rafa	Ángel; Jon; Patricia; Rafa	Against public vote	Patricia; Samuel	Cristina; Silvia	Patricia; Silvia	Brenda; Patricia	Ángel; Jon	Brenda; Jon; Mario
Saved by Academy's staff	Jon	Diana	Samuel	Patricia	Alba Lucía	Rafa	Brenda	Cristina	Patricia	Winner	Patricia; 58% to save	Silvia; 53% to save	Patricia; 56% to save	Brenda; 69% to save	Jon; 56% to save	Mario; 50.5% to win (out of 2)
Saved by contestants	Maxi; 6 of 14 votes to save	Elías; 5* of 13 votes to save	Jon; 6 of 12 votes to save	Elías; 4* of 11 votes to save	Rafa; 5 of 10 votes to save	Alba Lucía; 5 of 9 votes to save	Mario; 7 of 8 votes to save	Ángel; 5 of 7 votes to save	Jon	Eliminated Finalist	Samuel; 42% to save	Cristina; 47% to save	Silvia; 44% to save	Patricia; 31% to save	Ángel; 44% to save	Brenda; 49.5% to win (out of 2)
Saved by public vote	Elías; 68% to save (out of 2)	Jon; 52% to save	Elías; 62% to save	Jon; 79% to save	Diana; 64% to save	Elías; 56% to save	Jon; 60% to save	Rafa; 57% to save	Ángel; 56% to save	Eliminated Finalist	Samuel; 42% to save	Cristina; 47% to save	Silvia; 44% to save	Patricia; 31% to save	Ángel; 44% to save	Brenda; 49.5% to win (out of 2)
Eliminated	Púa; 32% to save (out of 2)	Guadiana; 48% to save	Pedro; 38% to save	Nazaret; 21% to save	Maxi; 36% to save	Diana; 44% to save	Elías; 40% to save	Alba Lucía; 43% to save	Rafa; 44% to save	Eliminated Finalist	Samuel; 42% to save	Cristina; 47% to save	Silvia; 44% to save	Patricia; 31% to save	Ángel; 44% to save	Jon; 31% to win (out of 3)
Eliminated	Patty; 7% to save (out of 3)	Guadiana; 48% to save	Pedro; 38% to save	Nazaret; 21% to save	Maxi; 36% to save	Diana; 44% to save	Elías; 40% to save	Alba Lucía; 43% to save	Rafa; 44% to save	Eliminated Finalist	Samuel; 42% to save	Cristina; 47% to save	Silvia; 44% to save	Patricia; 31% to save	Ángel; 44% to save	Jon; 31% to win (out of 3)
