= Guillermo Martín Taboada =

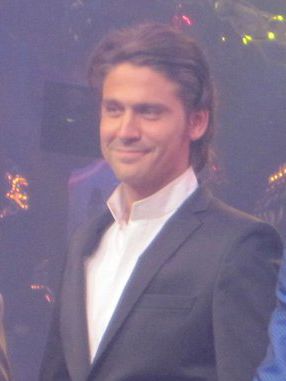
Guillermo Martín Taboada (2010)

Guillermo Martín Taboada (born 20 February 1981) is a singer, composer, actor and Spanish presenter.

== Youth ==
Taboada was born in Valencia in 1981. During his adolescence he showed clear predisposition to be artist. At 17 years old he had already won the Festival "Sings Sings", organised by the Valencian television Channel Nou and he interpreted If you look me of Alejandro Sanz.

He studied 4 years of interpretation in the Catalan School Banya of the Bou, 4 more years of singing in the Academy Protect Golden, and, finally, 2 years of sol-fa and piano in the Academy Alsina. He has been a soloist singer in the Orchestra Mancy for two years and afterwards in the Orchestra Búffalo for three years. Also, he sang in shows with magicians, humorists, etc. He was selected in the casting of the musical Today based in the musical group Mecano. He was one of the four finalists to interpret Mario, the leading character. Finally, he was not chosen for the paper.

=== Operation Triumph 2005 ===
He decided to present to the castings of Operation Triumph 2005 for the fourth edition (first edition made by Telecinco after the change of the chain of transmission of the contest). Guillermo had presented in the second edition, but was not selected. This time he attained to be chosen and ended the contest in tenth place. The director of the academy was Kike Santander. When finalizing the contest, he participated in Turns it of summer OT 2005 presenting in several cities of Spain, and recorded the MUSICAL disk beside other contestants of his same edition.

==== Songs that sang in OT 2005 ====
Number	Concursante	Song	Original interpreter
00	Guillermo Martín	"The house of Inés"	Guaraná
01	Guillermo Martín and Dani Sanz	"School of heat"	Future radio
02	Guillermo Martín and Mónica	"Tonight, I Celebrate My Love"	Peabo Bryson and Roberta Flack
03	Guillermo Martín and Sergio	"The Girl Is Mine"	Paul McCartney and Michael Jackson
04	Guillermo Martín with Edurne and Mónica	"At all it was an error"	Coti
05	Guillermo Martín and Lidia Kings	"The life is a carnival"	Celia Cruz
06	Guillermo Martín	"With you"	The singing of the crazy
07	Guillermo Martín	"Kiss"	Prince
08	Guillermo Martín	"Cruz of razors"	Mecano
09	Guillermo Martín and Idaira	"Happy navidad"	José Feliciano

== Television career ==
=== First works and participation in Look who dances! (2006) ===
When the tour ended OT 2005, he participated in a series of fiction on Channel 9 of RTVV called Matrimonis i Patrimonis embodying the character "Suso", a young WIFI installer that loved one of the protagonists. In 2006 he was also the attendant to put the voice to Peter Bread, in one of the musicals in "Peter Pan on Ice", an ice-skating show of the famous work of J.M. Barrie. The singer Lidia Kings did the voice of Wendy and recorded the song "Follows the stars".

In September 2006 he participated in the fourth edition of the program Look who dances! (Called now More than dance!) in The 1 of TVE. Guillermo managed to reach the end and celebrated in December. He ended up in third place, behind second place, Juan Alfonso Baptista "Cat," and the winner, Estela Giménez.

=== Stage in Antenna 3: To the letter and others (2007–2008) ===
In 2007, Guillermo Martín was the driver of the program The Uncovering of Antena 3. It was a contest that played with the psychology of the contestants. That year he also presented three programs for the rankings of Antenna 3. It was a series of episodes that gave a rating of the most sounded affairs, romances, fights, etc. He presented them beside Mónica Martínez.

Name of the ranking	Subject
It risks2	The riskiest characters
Despelota2	The most notorious uncoverings.
It thrills2	A selection of the most thrilling moments.

That year he also participated in weekly Paranoia, also from Antenna 3, which was a topical discussion program and humor, as each topic for discussion had a song with a modified letter reflecting the humor and irony. For this, the program had a small group of singers commissioned to put his music on the program. Guillermo Martín was one of the singers that collaborated each week. Also he was invited to the program Three in Line (The Sixth), to help the two parties seize the car that came into play, every Monday. In the week that he was invited to, he was with actress María Ravine, the presenters Félix Álvarez "Felisuco", Pilar Blond, and the exjugador of football Poli Corner, that joined to The Supreme of Móstoles, Lucía Holes, Agustín Jiménez and Goyo Jiménez, usual collaborators of the contest that formed part of the signpost of invited famous.

It formed part of the singers of the program To the letter of Antenna 3, beside Sandra Polop, Mercedes Durán and Carles Torregosa. It was a musical contest based in the karaoke and extracted of the original format American The Singing Bee (EE.UU.). It premièred on 25 December 2007. Guillermo left the program to be able to finish his next disk, being replaced by Anabel Owners.

=== Back works (2008–2010) ===
The summer of 2008 presented a program in Channel 9 called Crash!, a contest where people that had a car for more than 10 years, could win a new car.

This year participates like actor in Put me a cloud, Rocío (Channel South), a spin-off of the series Rocío almost mother. The series is a relate of soft and confident characters with small dramatic nuances. It narrates the enredos of two premiums: Rocío (Eva Pedraza) and Flor (Paz Padilla), that are @copropietario of the bar "The Cloud". Rocío is an optimistic and enthusiastic woman, that contrasts with Flor, a person very pesismista and false. Guillermo Martín gives life to Yago, that is the only son of Flor. This character will form part of a loving trio with María and Celia. Yago feels a love at first sight when seeing to María, to which tries to impress with all type of fantasmadas, but does not @darse that Celia is enamoured of him because it seems him a small girl.

Also it was sworn of the musical program Singing in family of RTVCM. Presented by Constantino Romero, went a musical program in which they shared distinct stage families of Castile-La Mancha.

Between 2008 and 2009, it collaborates in the program The best years of our life song to song substituting to Ivan Santos (after this left to participate in Survivors: Lost in Honduras), and participates sporadically in any of the concerts of turns it of the program. The singer sacked of the contest to centre definitively in the preparation of the launching discográfico of the disk of his band G Point.

He was invited to the Gala FAO of 2008 in TVE, where he presented his single "Do Not Know" of his first album with his band G Point. In 2009, Guillermo Martín was invited to the castings of the ninth edition of Operation Triumph in Seville. In 2009 he also went back to Look Who Dances! in a special program. In 2009, Antenna 3 organised for the night of 31 December a special edition of the program Sings if you can, in which two teams formed by famous people sang in special conditions, like running on a strip or submerged in a tank of ice. The points obtained by the winning team turned into holidays in the snow for one hundred boys, courtesy of Aramón (Mountains of Aragon) and Foundation Antenna3.

On 6 May 2010 he participated in the reality show Surviving 2010: Lost in Nicaragua of the chain Telecinco. Guillermo remained in eighth position before being expelled on 1 July 2010.

=== Works in Mexico (2010–2011) ===
In 2010 he participated in The Academy: Eighth Generation. The Academy is a reality show musical Mexican launched by Aztec TV. The season called "The Academy Bicentenario" was in honor of the 200 years of Mexico and other countries of Latin America. Magda Rodríguez and Lolita Cortés were in charge of the production of this season as the directors of The Academy. The casting initiated on 31 July 2010 in the United States by Aztec America and developed until principles of September in all Mexico and other countries of Latin America.

Guillermo Martín represented Spain during the selection process for La Academia 2010, participating in casting stages held in Spain, the United States, and Mexico. He was selected to compete in the Mexican reality television program La Academia in 2010. During the competition, he received positive evaluations from members of the faculty, including director Lolita Cortés.

Throughout the program, Martín was noted for his outspoken personality and for using Spanish expressions that drew attention from other contestants. Some of these phrases became associated with him during the show, leading to the informal nickname "El Inexplicable," as referenced by program commentators.

In the Concert 7 goes out of the contest causing controversy between the fans and viewers of the program as Guillermo, in spite of his controversy and controversial personality, was favourite for the final. For the Concert 8 goes out expelled, to weigh that it received votes in favour to avoid his expulsion and, in signal of support, abandoned the set of the concert his mates.

==== Songs that sang in The Academy ====
Concert	Concursante	Nationality	City of Origin	Song	Gender	Resulted
01	Guillermo Martín	SpainEspaña	ValenciaComunidad Valenciana	Corazón Partío	Pop	To I Save
02	Guillermo Martín	SpainEspaña	ValenciaComunidad Valenciana	So enamoured	Ballade	Sentenced
03	Guillermo Martín	SpainEspaña	ValenciaComunidad Valenciana	Your name knows me to grass	Pop-Flemish	Sentenced
04	Guillermo Martín	SpainEspaña	ValenciaComunidad Valenciana	It was worthwhile	Sauce	To I Save
05	Guillermo Martín	SpainEspaña	ValenciaComunidad Valenciana	Live like this is to die of love	Big Band – Live orchestra	To I Save
06	Guillermo Martín	SpainEspaña	ValenciaComunidad Valenciana	Persiana American	Rock	Sentenced
07	Guillermo Martín	SpainEspaña	ValenciaComunidad Valenciana	I am enamoured	Reggaeton	Sentenced
08	Guillermo Martín	SpainEspaña	ValenciaComunidad Valenciana	It Did not sing	-	Deleted

In 2011 it is invited to drive the program Generation 2011 in Mexico, issued by Aztec TV and Aztec America together with Ivonne Montero, Lili Brillanti, and Melchor. It was a month due to the fact that it had to finish to do his disk that made in Spain. His exit of the program caused that the fans and televidentes demanded his return during weeks in front of the production of Aztec TV.

== Musical career ==
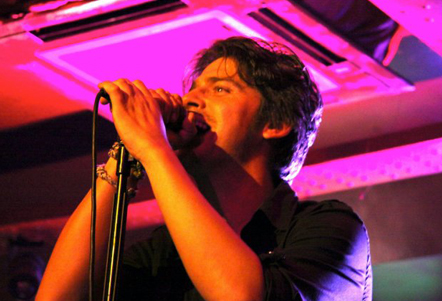
Guillermo Martín in a concert in Jaén.

=== Operation Triumph ===
It participates in the Musical album, where the 10 finalists of Operation Triumph 2005 versionan songs of the musical more important of the history of this gender. It was Disk of Platinum and a success of sales in Spain.

=== Generation OT ===
In 2006, Guillermo receives the proposal of Gestmusic Endemol, producer of "Operation Triumph", to gather with Sandra Polop and Fran Dieli (both concursantes of Operation Triumph 2005) creating the group Generation OT. They launch an album produced by Carlos Quintero (Chenoa and Carlos Baute) under the stamp discográfico of Tool Music. The campaign included the recording of a disk and one turns of concerts during the summer of the 2006 that initiated in Valencia and continued by diverse cities of Spain. The album Generation OT includes 10 songs, 3 of the which are interpreted by Guillermo in solitary. The single of the disk interpreted by the three singers was "Sunny, you and I". It turns out it was promoted by soda Sunny Delight, from here the name of the first single.

The album goes in the list that elaborates Promusicae with the more sold disks in Spain.

In 2006, it records in solitary the main subjects for the musical work "Peter Bread on Ice". Between them, the central subject "Follows to the stars".

=== G Point ===
- 2008 – it Gives the face

Of him it extracts the single "do not know", launched in November 2008.

- 2013 – Dawn zulú
