= Virginia Maestro =

Virginia Maestro (Virginia Labuat)
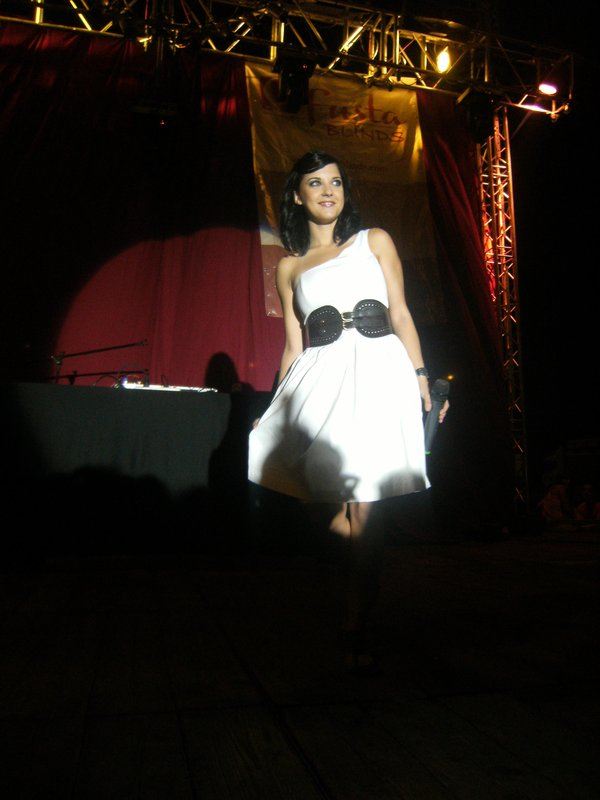

Background information
- Also known as: Virginia Labuat, La Niña Azul, Viki
- Born: Virginia Maestro Díaz; 29 September 1982 (age 43)
- Origin: Linares, Jaén, Spain
- Genres: Pop; indie; jazz; blues
- Occupations: Singer-songwriter; musician
- Instruments: Vocals; guitar
- Years active: 2008–present
- Labels: Sony Music; Columbia Records
- Website: Official website

This is about artist also known as Virginia Labuat. For the musical project with The Pinker Tones, Risto Mejide and Virginia Maestro, see Labuat

Virginia Maestro Díaz (born 29 September 1982) is a Spanish singer-songwriter. She is the winner of Operación Triunfo 2008, the Spanish version of Star Academy.

In 2009, she associated herself with Labuat, a musical project with Risto Mejide, one of the judges of OT, and The Pinker Tones. Many of her recordings are thus credited to Virginia Labuat.

== Biography ==
=== Influences and early career ===
Virgínia has said in various interviews that she was exposed to a variety of music from an early age, especially those of her parents' adolescence. Nowadays, she takes most influence from the 1950s and 1960s, naming Eva Cassidy, The Beatles, Janis Joplin, Solomon Burke, Radiohead, Otis Redding, Ray Charles and Sam Cooke as her favorite artists.

At the age of twelve, influenced by her sisters, she began teaching herself how to play the guitar and she wrote her first songs in a diary, to whom she called "Diario de Sensaciones" (Sensations' Diary). When she was fifteen, she entered in her first band and started to participate in jam sessions. Until her entrance in OT, she had been a part of Fundación Virginia, Little Vicky & the Shout Band, 7Funk, The Flik Flak Duo, Boogie Flu and had shared the stage with such bands as Black Jack Bob & the New Deal and Mingo & The Blues Intruders. Aside from that experiences, she had also been a soprano at the University of Seville choir, where she studied music.

=== Operación Triunfo 2008 ===
After being turned down on the castings for the second and third series of the contest, finally, in 2008, Virginia Maestro was cast to the sixth series of Operación Triunfo, (roughly Operation Victory) a talent show in Spain. She differentiated herself from other contestants with her distinctive style and song choices, preferring jazz-blues tunes over pop. She was almost voted off the show several times but was saved by the public, until she was named the winner in the finale. During the contest, she gained a fan base who began to call her "La Niña Azul" (the Blue Girl). Therefore, her fan base is often called "La Marea Azul" (the Blue Tide). She was the first contest in history of Operación Triunfo (also known as OT) to reach number one on the Spanish iTunes chart, which she accomplished with covers of "Creep", "My Baby Just Cares For Me" and "Moonlight Shadow". While in the competition, she received support from Risto Mejide, the most opinionated member of the jury. He would later become the producer of Labuat.

=== Labuat ===
After winning OT and earning a contract with Sony BMG, she became part of the musical project Labuat, which opened for Beyoncé in Spain in May 2009. Her music video of Soy Tu Aire, the first single from the album, is an Internet sensation. In June 2009, "De Pequeño" was released as the second single. " She made an appearance in the sixth gala of OT 2009 singing the song. Also in June, it was announced that a second album is being prepared and that Risto Mejide would not be involved. Carta de Otoño", the only song composed solely by her, was released as the third and last single in October 2009. The first album of the band was nominated for best album of the year.
In March 2010, during an interview for OperacionTriunfo.com, Maestro announced that, due to time conflicts, the Pinker Tones will not produce the new album, leaving her as the only initial member of the band working on the second album. She has also confirmed the album will include her own compositions, in both Spanish and English.

In October 2010, Maestro announced the title of the second album, "Dulce Hogar" (Sweet Home, in Spanish) and that she would use the moniker Virginia Labuat. The first single debuted on 25 January 2011 in Europa FM and was available for download on 8 February 2011, and the whole album was released on 29 March 2011. A limited special edition of the album includes an EP with a few rare songs she had performed live during the previous years, as well some Spanish versions of the English songs. Shortly after the release, the album was already on Spanish Top Charts.

== Personal life ==
In Operacion Triunfo, Virginia confessed she has never been able to quit smoking. When she entered to the academy, she had a boyfriend, but they broke up soon after. There have been rumors she was dating Risto Mejide, which has been denied by both.

== Discography ==
=== Albums ===
As part of Labuat

Year	Album	Chart positions
Year	Album	SPA
2009	Labuat	2

Solo

Year	Album	Chart positions
Year	Album	SPA
2011	Dulce hogar	11
2013	Night & Day	11
2015	Blue Bird	41
2019	Del Sur	88

=== Singles ===
as part of Labuat

Year	Single	Chart positions	Album
Year	Single	SPA	Album
2009	"Soy Tu Aire"	34	Labuat
2009	"De Pequeño"	–	Labuat
2009	"Carta De Otoño"	–	Labuat

Solo

Year	Single	Chart positions	Album
Year	Single	SPA	Album
2011	"The Time Is Now"	8	Dulce hogar
2011	"Circus"	27	Dulce hogar
2012	"I Call Your Name"	–	Dulce hogar
2013	"Dream Man"	31	Night & Day
2013	"Night & Day"	–	Night & Day
2015	"Make It Alright"	42	Blue Bird
2016	"Loneliness"	–	Blue Bird
