= Church of San Pedro Apóstol (Camarma de Esteruelas) =

Church in Camarma de Esteruelas, Spain

- Iglesia Parroquial de San Pedro Apóstol (Spanish)
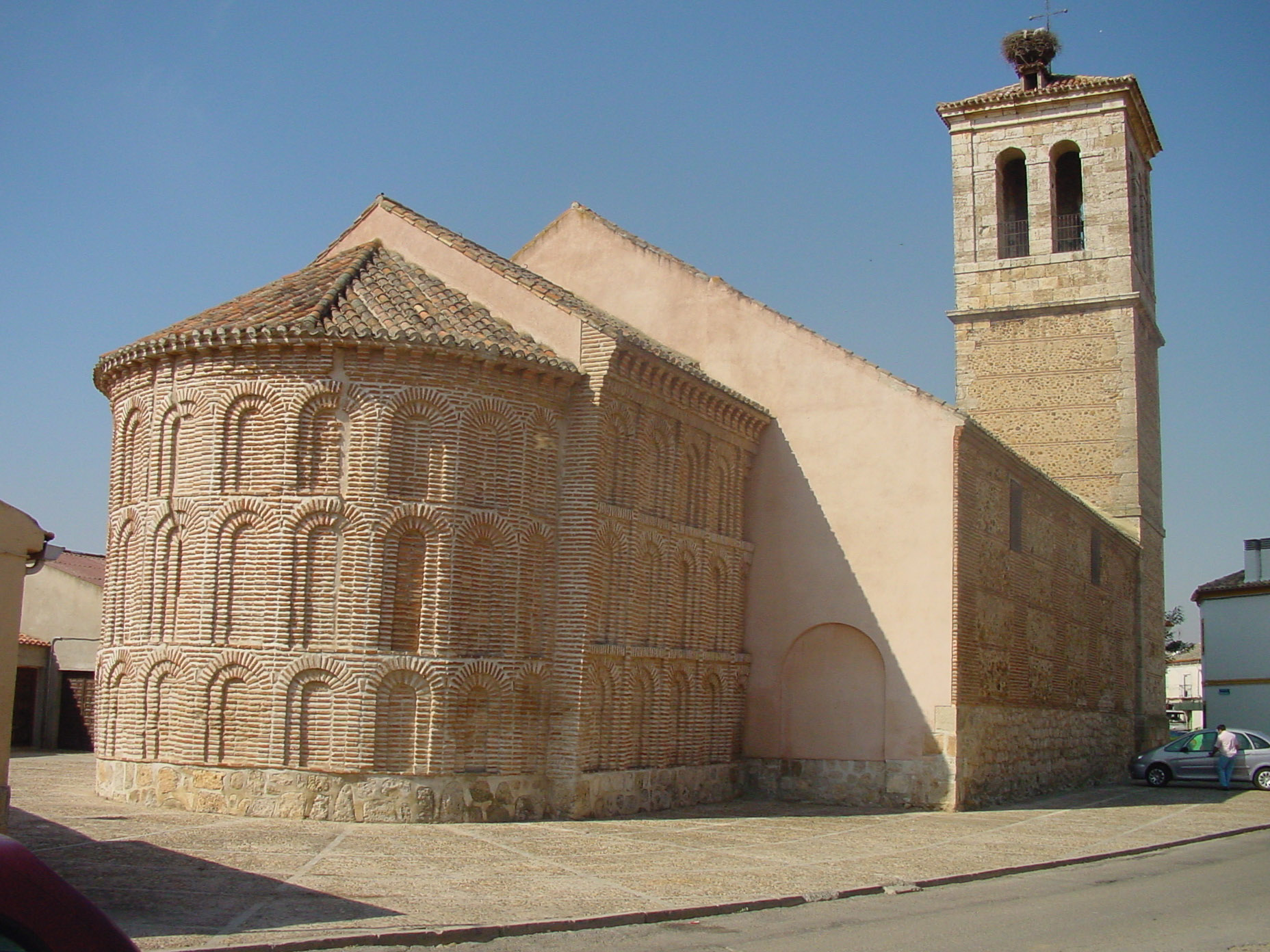

- Location within Spain
- 40.54871°N 3.376757°W
- Location: Camarma de Esteruelas, Spain

Spanish Cultural Heritage
- Official name: Iglesia Parroquial de San Pedro Apóstol
- Type: Non-movable
- Criteria: Monument
- Designated: 1997
- Reference no.: RI-51-0009948

The Church of San Pedro Apóstol (Spanish: Iglesia Parroquial de San Pedro Apóstol) is a church located in Camarma de Esteruelas, Spain. It was declared Bien de Interés Cultural in 1997.

== History and characteristics ==
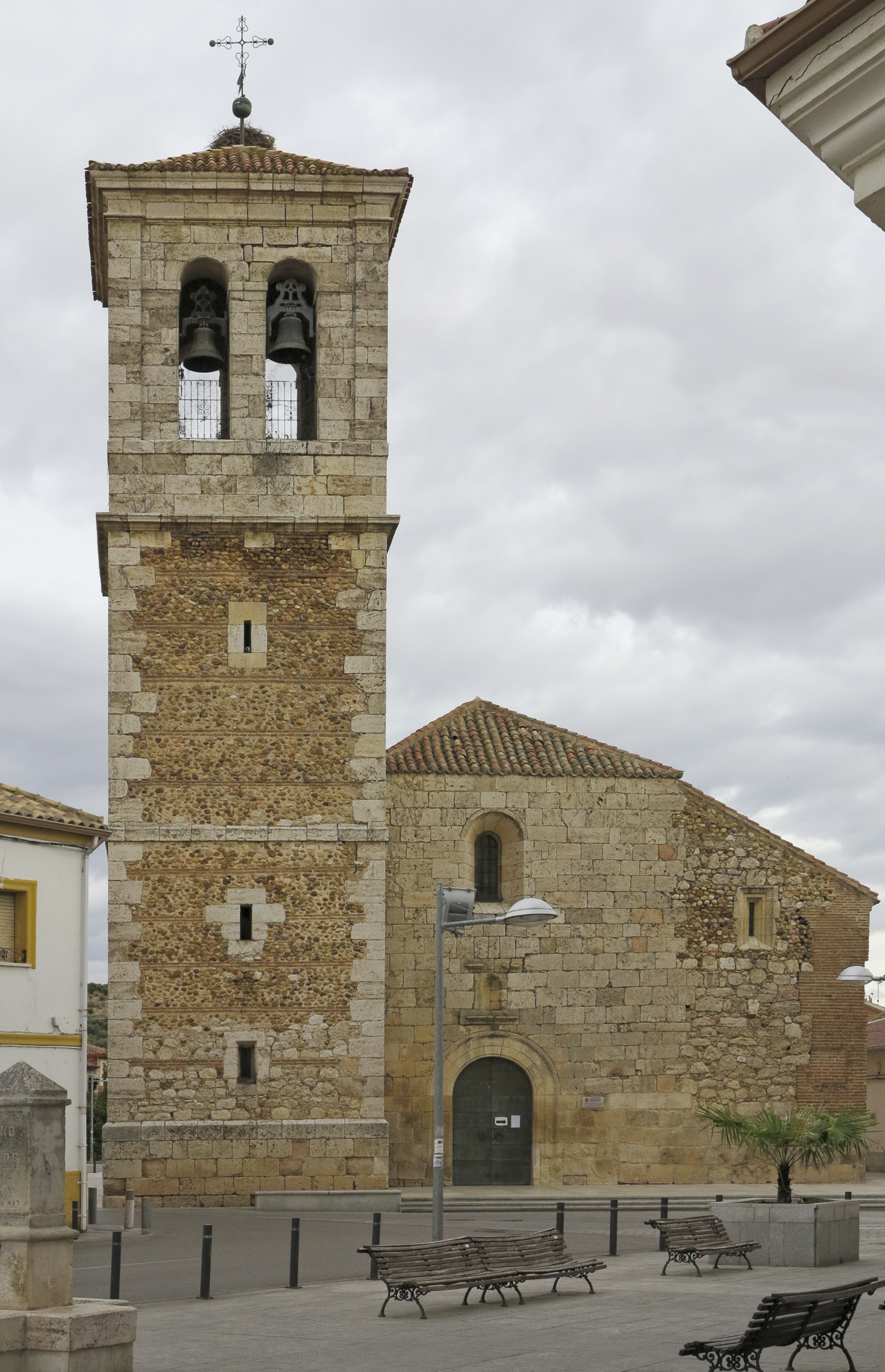
View of the church bell tower.

The church, with a design plan consisting of three naves and a horn, presents two distinct construction phases. It preserves both the apse and the brick anteapse from its original construction in the 13th century. The rest of the church's construction was rushed in the middle of the 16th century. The interior roofing, constructed to accommodate the new naves, was made with wood and attached to the apse. The bell tower was constructed by Juan de Ballesteros.

The frescoes painted in the apse and around the altar of the church were finished in the 14th century. Facing the congregation are frescoes of Saint John the Evangelist (depicted with a wine glass) and possibly Saint Roch (depicted walking alongside a dog carrying a loaf of bread). Within the altar, both a fresco depicting Adam's temptation and a fresco depicting Saint Sebastian's martyrdom have been preserved. Perhaps the greatest of the church's Romanesque frescoes is the preserved Pantocrator.

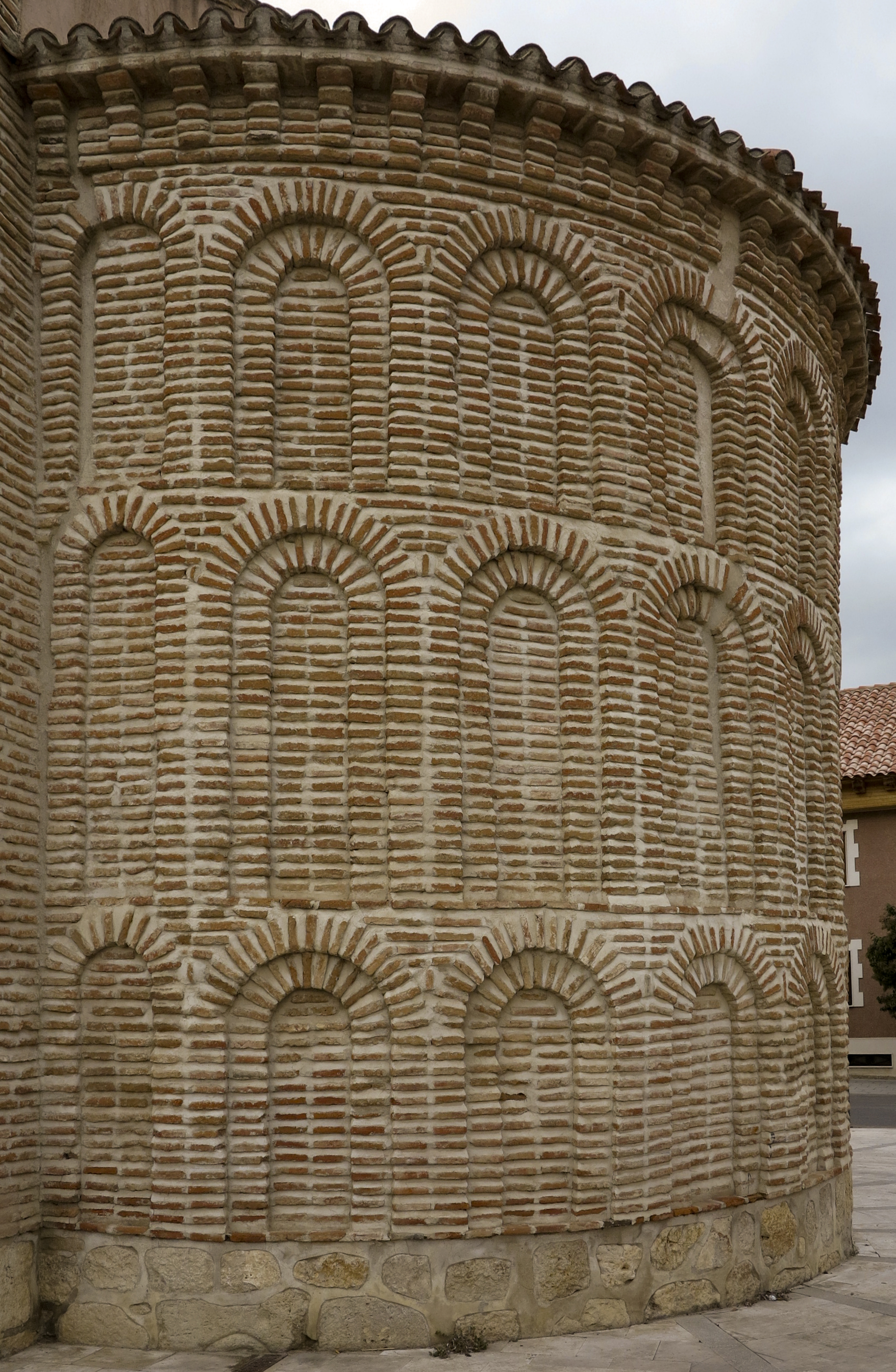
Detail of apse with three levels of arches.

The parish is a part of the Diocese of Alcalá de Henares and the archpriesthood of Daganzo.
