= Operación Triunfo series 6 =

Operación Triunfo
- Series 6
- Hosted by: Jesús Vázquez
- Judges: Noemí Galera; Risto Mejide; Javier Llano; Coco Comín
- Winner: Virginia Maestro
- Runner-up: Pablo López
- Location: Parc Audiovisual de Catalunya, Terrassa, Barcelona

Release
- Original network: Telecinco
- Original release: 6 April – 21 July 2008

Series chronology
- ← Previous; Series 5 Next → Series 7

Operación Triunfo is a Spanish reality television music competition to find new singing talent. The sixth series, also known as Operación Triunfo 2008, aired on Telecinco from 8 April 2008 to 22 July 2008, presented by Jesús Vázquez.

Virginia Maestro was the winner of the series.

== Headmaster, judges and presenter ==
- Headmaster: Àngel Llàcer
- Judges: Noemí Galera, Risto Mejide, Javier Llano and Coco Comín
- Presenter: Jesús Vázquez

== Contestants ==
Contestant	Age	Residence	Episode of elimination	Place finished
Virginia	25	Jaén	Gala Final	Winner
Pablo	24	Málaga	Gala Final	Runner-up
Chipper	34	New York City	Gala Final	3rd
Manu	17	Córdoba	Gala 14	4th
Sandra	24	Córdoba	Gala 13	5th
Mimi	26	Melilla	Gala 12	6th
Iván	24	Madrid	Gala 11	7th
Noelia	23	Valencia	Gala 10	8th
Anabel	22	Córdoba	Gala 9	9th
Tania S.	18	Seville	Gala 8	10th
Reke	22	Murcia	Gala 7	11th
Esther	20	Málaga	Gala 6	12th
Tania G.	25	Barcelona	Gala 5	13th
Rubén	21	Barcelona	Gala 4	14th
Paula	23	Seville	Gala 3	15th
Ros	16	Barcelona	Gala 2	16th
Patty	24	Santander	Gala 1	17th (Quit)
Jorge	23	Valencia	Gala 0	Not selected
Juanjo	28	Murcia	Gala 0	Not selected

== Galas ==
=== Results summary ===
Colour key

–	Contestant received the most public votes and was exempt for nominations.
–	Contestant was up for the elimination but was saved by the Academy's staff.
–	Contestant was up for the elimination but was saved by the contestants.
–	Contestants were up for the elimination and were the nominees of the week.
–	Contestant was up for the elimination but was immediately saved by the public votes.
–	Contestant was up for the elimination but was immediately eliminated by the public votes.

	Gala 0	Gala 1	Gala 2	Gala 3	Gala 4	Gala 5	Gala 6	Gala 7	Gala 8	Gala 9	Gala 10	Gala 11	Gala 12	Gala 13	Gala 14	Final
Virginia	Tania S.	Ros	Tania S.	Tania G.	Tania G.	Nominated	Nominated	Nominated	Anabel	Manu	Nominated; Mark: 6.6	Finalist	Saved	Saved	Saved	Winner (Final)
Pablo	Rubén	Ros	Esther	Rubén	Tania S.	Tania S.	Noelia	Anabel	Iván	Mimi	Iván; Mark: 6.7	Finalist	Saved	Saved	Saved	Runner-up (Final)
Chipper	Juanjo	Reke	Paula	Tania G.	Tania S.	Tania S.	Noelia	Anabel	Noelia	Noelia	Mimi; Mark: 8.5	Finalist	Saved	Saved	Saved	3rd Place (Final)
Manu	Tania S.	Ros	Tania S.	Tania G.	Tania S.	Virginia	Virginia	Virginia	Noelia	Nominated	Virginia; Mark: 7.5	Finalist	Saved	Saved	Eliminated	4th place (Gala 14)
Sandra	Tania S.	Esther	Esther	Esther	Tania G.	Tania S.	Noelia	Anabel	Anabel	Mimi	Mimi; Mark: 6.5	Finalist	Saved	Eliminated	5th place (Gala 13)	
Mimi	Tania S.	Esther	Esther	Esther	Esther	Tania S.	Noelia	Anabel	Iván	Saved	Saved; Mark: 5.5	Finalist	Eliminated	6th place (Gala 12)		
Iván	Rubén	Esther	Esther	Tania G.	Esther	Tania S.	Noelia	Anabel	Nominated	Mimi	Nominated; Mark: 5.6	Evicted (Gala 11)				
Noelia	Rubén	Esther	Tania S.	Tania G.	Esther	Tania S.	Saved	Anabel	Saved	Nominated	Evicted (Gala 10)					
Anabel	Rubén	Esther	Tania S.	Tania G.	Esther	Tania S.	Noelia	Saved	Nominated	Evicted (Gala 9)						
Tania S.	Saved	Reke	Saved	Tania G.	Nominated	Saved	Virginia	Nominated	Evicted (Gala 8)							
Reke	Juanjo	Nominated	Tania S.	Rubén	Esther	Virginia	Nominated	Evicted (Gala 7)								
Esther	Rubén	Saved	Nominated	Nominated	Saved	Nominated	Evicted (Gala 6)									
Tania G.	Tania S.	Reke	Tania S.	Saved	Nominated	Evicted (Gala 5)										
Rubén	Saved	Esther	Esther	Nominated	Evicted (Gala 4)											
Paula	Not in Academy		Nominated	Evicted (Gala 3)												
Ros	Juanjo	Nominated	Evicted (Gala 2)													
Patty	Tania S.	Left Competition (Gala 1)														
Jorge	Eliminated	Not selected (Gala 0)														
Juanjo	Eliminated	Not selected (Gala 0)														
Up for elimination	Jorge; Juanjo; Mimi; Rubén; Tania S.	Esther; Reke; Ros; Tania G.	Esther; Iván; Paula; Tania S.	Esher; Rubén; Tania G. Virginia	Anabel; Esther; Tania G. Tania S.	Esther; Mimi; Tania S. Virginia	Iván; Noelia; Reke; Virginia	Anabel; Noelia; Tania S. Virginia	Anabel; Iván; Noelia; Sandra	Manu; Mimi; Noelia; Pablo	Iván; Mimi; Sandra; Virginia	Against public vote	Mimi; Sandra	Manu; Sandra	Manu; Pablo	Chipper; Pablo; Virginia
Saved by Academy's staff	Mimi	Tania G.	Iván	Virginia	Anabel	Mimi	Iván	Noelia	Sandra	Pablo	Sandra	Winner	Sandra; 56% to save	Manu; 68% to save	Pablo; 56% to save	Virginia; 55% to win (out of 2)
Saved by contestants	Tania S. 6 of 14 votes to save	Esther; 6 of 12 votes to save	Tania S. 6 of 12 votes to save	Tania G. 7 of 11 votes to save	Esther; 5 of 10 votes to save	Tania S. 7 of 9 votes to save	Noelia; 6 of 8 votes to save	Anabel; 6 of 7 votes to save	Noelia; 2* of 6 votes to save	Mimi; 3 of 5 votes to save	Mimi; 2 of 4 votes to save	Eliminated Finalist	Mimi; 44% to save	Sandra; 32% to save	Manu; 44% to save	Pablo; 45% to win (out of 2)
Saved by public vote	Rubén; 66% to save	Reke; 54% to save	Esther; 53% to save	Esther; 53% to save	Tania S. 53% to save	Virginia; 75% to save	Virginia; 57% to save	Virginia; 61% to save	Iván; 58% to save	Manu; 68% to save	Virginia; 56% to save	Eliminated Finalist	Mimi; 44% to save	Sandra; 32% to save	Manu; 44% to save	Pablo; 45% to win (out of 2)
Eliminated	Jorge; Fewest votes to save	Ros; 46% to save	Paula; 47% to save	Rubén; 47% to save	Tania G. 47% to save	Esther; 25% to save	Reke; 43% to save	Tania S. 39% to save	Anabel; 42% to save	Noelia; 32% to save	Iván; 44% to save	Eliminated Finalist	Mimi; 44% to save	Sandra; 32% to save	Manu; 44% to save	Chipper; 28% to win (out of 3)
Eliminated	Juanjo; Fewest votes to save	Ros; 46% to save	Paula; 47% to save	Rubén; 47% to save	Tania G. 47% to save	Esther; 25% to save	Reke; 43% to save	Tania S. 39% to save	Anabel; 42% to save	Noelia; 32% to save	Iván; 44% to save	Eliminated Finalist	Mimi; 44% to save	Sandra; 32% to save	Manu; 44% to save	Chipper; 28% to win (out of 3)

=== Gala 0 (8 April 2008) ===
- Musical guest: Mónica Naranjo ("Europa")

Contestants' performances on Gala 0
Contestant	Order	Song	Result
Pablo	1	"The Show Must Go On"	Saved by the jury
Tania G.	2	"En Qué Estrella Estará"	Saved by the jury
Reke	3	"Embrujada"	Saved by the jury
Anabel	4	"Café, café"	Saved by the jury
Iván	5	"Eugenio Salvador Dalí"	Saved by the jury
Sandra	6	"Qué Hiciste"	Saved by the jury
Chipper	7	"My Girl"	Saved by the jury
Noelia	8	"Besaré el suelo"	Saved by the jury
Jorge	9	"La bomba"	Eliminated
Virginia	10	"Smile"	Saved by the jury
Mimi	11	"Abre tu mente"	Saved by the Academy's staff
Ros	12	"Por la boca vive el pez"	Saved by the jury
Tania S.	13	"No voy a cambiar"	Saved by contestants
Manu	14	"Unfaithful"	Saved by the jury
Patty	15	"Tú y yo volvemos al amor"	Saved by the jury
Esther	16	"Runaway"	Saved by the jury
Rubén	17	"Kilómetros"	Saved by the public vote
Juanjo	18	"Relax, Take It Easy"	Eliminated

=== Gala 1 (15 April 2008) ===
- Musical guest: Duffy ("Mercy")

Contestants' performances on Gala 1
Contestant	Order	Song	Result
Pablo	1	"Cuando me vaya"	Saved by the jury
Patty	1	"Cuando me vaya"	Left Competition
Chipper	2	"Crazy"	Saved by the jury
Iván	2	"Crazy"	Saved by the jury
Anabel	3	"Amor Gitano"	Saved by the jury
Manu	3	"Amor Gitano"	Saved by the jury
Noelia	4	"Ain't No Other Man"	Saved by the jury
Sandra	4	"Ain't No Other Man"	Saved by the jury
Reke	5	"Me Enamora"	Nominated by the jury; up for elimination
Ros	5	"Me Enamora"	Nominated by the jury; up for elimination
Rubén	6	"Tu recuerdo"	Favourite of the audience
Tania S.	6	"Tu recuerdo"	Saved by the jury
Mimi	7	"I'll Stand By You"	Saved by the jury
Virginia	7	"I'll Stand By You"	Saved by the jury
Esther	8	"Las de la Intuición"	Nominated by the jury; saved by contestants
Tania G.	8	"Las de la Intuición"	Nominated by the jury; saved by the Academy's staff

=== Gala 2 (22 April 2008) ===
- Musical guest: Lorena Gómez ("Maniac") (with the contestants)

Contestants' performances on Gala 2
Contestant	Order	Song	Result
Up for elimination
Reke	1	"Greatest Love of All"	Saved by the public vote; saved by the jury
Ros	2	"Don't Look Back in Anger"	Eliminated
Regular performances
Paula	3	"Yo canto"	Nominated by the jury; up for elimination
Sandra	3	"Yo canto"	Saved by the jury
Tania S.	3	"Yo canto"	Nominated by the jury; saved by contestants
Manu	4	"Bad Day"	Favourite of the audience
Pablo	4	"Bad Day"	Saved by the jury
Iván	5	"Como un Lobo"	Nominated by the jury; saved by the Academy's staff
Mimi	5	"Como un Lobo"	Saved by the jury
Esther	6	"Para ti sería"	Nominated by the jury; up for elimination
Ruben	6	"Para ti sería"	Saved by the jury
Chipper	7	"La mañana"	Saved by the jury
Noelia	7	"La mañana"	Saved by the jury
Anabel	8	"I Love to Love"	Saved by the jury
Tania G.	8	"I Love to Love"	Saved by the jury
Virginia	8	"I Love to Love"	Saved by the jury

=== Gala 3 (29 April 2008) ===
- Musical guests:
  - Lenny Kravitz ("I'll Be Waiting)
  - Craig David ("Officially Yours")

Contestants' performances on Gala 3
Contestant	Order	Song	Result
Up for elimination
Esther	1	"Me muero"	Saved by the public vote; nominated by the jury; up for elimination
Paula	2	"Fly Me to the Moon"	Eliminated
Regular performances
Rubén	3	"Isla de Palma"	Nominated by the jury; up for elimination
Virginia	3	"Isla de Palma"	Nominated by the jury; saved by the Academy's staff
Iván	4	"Pienso tanto en ti"	Saved by the jury
Sandra	4	"Pienso tanto en ti"	Saved by the jury
Mimi	5	"Sway"	Saved by the jury
Noelia	5	"Sway"	Saved by the jury
Tania G.	5	"Sway"	Nominated by the jury; saved by contestants
Manu	6	"Miradas cruzadas"	Favourite of the audience
Tania S.	6	"Miradas cruzadas"	Saved by the jury
Anabel	7	"Tengo"	Saved by the jury
Pablo	7	"Tengo"	Saved by the jury
Chipper	8	"Dancing in the Street"	Saved by the jury
Reke	8	"Dancing in the Street"	Saved by the jury

=== Gala 4 (6 May 2008) ===
- Musical guest: Rosario Flores ("No dudaría") (with the contestants) & ("Algo contigo")

Contestants' performances on Gala 4
Contestant	Order	Song	Result
Up for elimination
Esther	1	"Un error de los grandes"	Saved by the public vote; nominated by the jury; saved by contestants
Rubén	2	"Noelia"	Eliminated
Regular performances
Manu	3	"Por ti seré"	Saved by the jury
Noelia	4	"No One"	Saved by the jury
Pablo	4	"No One"	Saved by the jury
Chipper	5	"Mejor decir adiós"	Saved by the jury
Mimi	5	"Mejor decir adiós"	Saved by the jury
Anabel	6	"Pokito a poko"	Nominated by the jury; saved by the Academy's staff
Tania S.	6	"Pokito a poko"	Nominated by the jury; up for elimination
Virginia	7	"Downtown"	Favourite of the audience
Sandra	8	"Ni una sola palabra"	Saved by the jury
Tania G.	8	"Ni una sola palabra"	Nominated by the jury; up for elimination
Iván	9	"Let Me Entertain You"	Saved by the jury
Reke	9	"Let Me Entertain You"	Saved by the jury

=== Gala 5 (13 May 2008) ===
- Musical guests:
  - Mónica Naranjo ("Amor y lujo") (with the contestants)
  - Alejandro Fernández ("Te Voy A Perder")

Contestants' performances on Gala 5
Contestant	Order	Song	Result
Up for elimination
Tania G.	1	"Don't Speak"	Eliminated
Tania S.	2	"Y qué pequeña soy yo"	Saved by the public vote; nominated by the jury; saved by contestants
Regular performances
Noelia	3	"Footprints in the Sand"	Saved by the jury
Chipper	4	"Dead Ringer for Love"	Saved by the jury
Sandra	4	"Dead Ringer for Love"	Saved by the jury
Anabel	5	"Ahora quién"	Saved by the jury
Manu	6	"El perfume de la soledad"	Favourite of the audience
Mimi	6	"El perfume de la soledad"	Nominated by the jury; saved by the Academy's staff
Reke	7	"Cómo hablar"	Saved by the jury
Virginia	7	"Cómo hablar"	Nominated by the jury; up for elimination
Esther	8	"Limón y Sal"	Nominated by the jury; up for elimination
Iván	8	"Limón y Sal"	Saved by the jury
Pablo	9	"Instant Replay"	Saved by the jury

=== Gala 6 (20 May 2008) ===
- Musical guest: Sergio Dalma ("A buena hora")

Contestants' performances on Gala 6
Contestant	Order	Song	Result
Up for elimination
Esther	1	"Adiós"	Eliminated
Virginia	2	"Love Me Like a Man"	Saved by the public vote; nominated by the jury; up for elimination
Regular performances
Mimi	3	"No sé si es amor"	Saved by the jury
Iván	4	"Estrella Polar"	Nominated by the jury; saved by the Academy's staff
Anabel	5	"Pégate"	Saved by the jury
Noelia	5	"Pégate"	Nominated by the jury; saved by contestants
Manu	6	"Smells Like Teen Spirit"	Saved by the jury
Reke	6	"Smells Like Teen Spirit"	Nominated by the jury; up for elimination
Pablo	7	"Mi Niña Lola"	Saved by the jury
Tania S.	7	"Mi Niña Lola"	Saved by the jury
Sandra	8	"Addicted to Love"	Saved by the jury
Chipper	9	"A Song for You"	Favourite of the audience

=== Gala 7 (27 May 2008) ===
- Musical guest: David Bustamante ("Cobarde")

Contestants' performances on Gala 7
Contestant	Order	Song	Result
Up for elimination
Reke	1	"No me fio"	Eliminated
Virginia	2	"Creep"	Saved by the public vote; nominated by the jury; up for elimination
Regular performances
Anabel	3	"Hasta llegar a enloquecer"	Nominated by the jury; saved by contestants
Noelia	4	"Why'd You Lie to Me"	Nominated by the jury; saved by the Academy's staff
Mimi	5	"Aún no te has ido"	Saved by the jury
Tania S.	5	"Aún no te has ido"	Nominated by the jury; up for elimination
Manu	6	"Sólo otra vez"	Favourite of the audience
Iván	7	"With a Little Help from My Friends"	Saved by the jury
Pablo	7	"With a Little Help from My Friends"	Saved by the jury
Sandra	8	"Let the River Run"	Saved by the jury
Chipper	9	It's Chico Time	Saved by the jury

=== Gala 8 (3 June 2008) ===
- Musical guest: Carlos Baute ("Ángelito") (with the contestants)

Contestants' performances on Gala 8
Contestant	Order	Song	Result
Up for elimination
Tania S.	1	"Encerrada en Libertad"	Eliminated
Virginia	2	"My Baby Just Cares for Me"	Saved by the public vote; saved by the jury
Regular performances
Manu	3	"Beat It"	Saved by the jury
Chipper	4	"Siempre es de noche"	Favourite of the audience
Sandra	5	"Sedúceme"	Nominated by the jury; saved by the Academy's staff
Pablo	6	"All Out of Love"	Saved by the jury
Mimi	7	"Say It Right"	Saved by the jury
Anabel	8	"Daría"	Nominated by the jury; up for elimination
Iván	9	"La fuerza de mi corazón"	Nominated by the jury; up for elimination
Noelia	9	"La fuerza de mi corazón"	Nominated by the jury; saved by contestants

=== Gala 9 (10 June 2008) ===
- Group performance: "Agua"
- Musical guest: Leona Lewis ("Bleeding Love")

Contestants' performances on Gala 9
Contestant	Order	Song	Result
Up for elimination
Anabel	1	"Punto de partida"	Eliminated
Iván	2	"Estoy"	Saved by the public vote; saved by the jury
Regular performances
Chipper	3	"You Sexy Thing"	Saved by the jury
Manu	4	"Quiéreme tal como soy"	Nominated by the jury; up for elimination
Mimi	5	"Muñeca de Trapo"	Nominated by the jury; saved by contestants
Noelia	6	"MacArthur Park"	Nominated by the jury; up for elimination
Pablo	7	"Para la Libertad"	Nominated by the jury; saved by the Academy's staff
Sandra	8	"Memory"	Saved by the jury
Virginia	9	"Moonlight Shadow"	Favourite of the audience

=== Gala 10 (17 June 2008) ===
- Musical guests:
  - Melocos and Natalia Jiménez ("Cuando me vaya")
  - Songs: OneRepublic ("Apologize")

Contestants' performances on Gala 10
Contestant	Order	Song	Result
Up for elimination
Manu	1	"À Corps perdu"	Saved by the public vote; saved by the jury; Finalist
Noelia	2	"Sólo por ti"	Eliminated
Regular performances
Chipper	3	"O tú o nada"	Saved by the jury; Finalist
Iván	4	"Words"	Up for elimination
Pablo	5	"Shine"	Saved by the jury; Finalist
Virginia	6	"Porque te vas"	Up for elimination
Mimi	7	"Amar haciendo el amor"	Saved by contestants; Finalist
Sandra	8	"Disco Inferno"	Saved by the Academy's staff; Finalist

=== Gala 11 (24 June 2008) ===
- Musical guests:
  - Merche ("Ya no me digas lo siento")
  - Juanes ("Gotas de Agua Dulce")

Contestants' performances on Gala 11
Contestant	Order	First Song	Order	Second Song	Order	Gala 0 Song	Result
Up for elimination
Iván	1	"Garganta con arena"	8	"Estoy"	N/A (already eliminated)		Eliminated
Virginia	2	"Lovefool"	9	"My Baby Just Cares for Me"	15	"Smile"	Saved by the public vote; Finalist
Regular performances
Chipper	3	"That's Life"	N/A		10	"My Girl"	Already qualified
Pablo	4	"¿Lo ves?"	N/A		13	"The Show Must Go On"	Already qualified
Manu	5	"Light My Fire"	N/A		11	"Unfaithful"	Already qualified
Sandra	6	"Chicas Malas"	N/A		14	"Qué Hiciste"	Already qualified
Mimi	7	"Bailando Salsa"	N/A		12	"Abre tu mente"	Already qualified

=== Gala 12 (1 July 2008) ===
- Musical guests:
  - Luis Fonsi ("No Me Doy por Vencido")
  - Gerónimo Rauch ("Getsemaní")

Contestants' performances on Gala 12
Contestant	Order	Song	Result
Regular performances
Chipper	1	"(Sittin' On) The Dock of the Bay"	Saved
Manu	2	"I Drove All Night"	Saved
Mimi	3	"Durmiendo sola"	Up for elimination
Pablo	4	"Se dejaba llevar"	Saved
Sandra	5	"Highway to Hell"	Up for elimination
Virginia	6	"Lunas Rotas"	Saved
Eliminated
Mimi	7	"Amar haciendo el amor"	Up for elimination
Sandra	8	"Let the River Run"	Saved by the public vote

=== Gala 13 (8 July 2008) ===
- Musical guests:
  - Rihanna ("Don't Stop the Music")
  - Rihanna and David Bisbal ("Hate That I Love You")

Contestants' performances on Gala 13
Contestant	Order	Song	Result
Regular performances
Chipper	1	"Get Ready"	Saved
Manu	2	"Fantástico amor"	Up for elimination
Pablo	3	"Ojos verdes"	Saved
Sandra	4	"And I Am Telling You I'm Not Going"	Up for elimination
Virginia	5	"Ben"	Saved
Up for elimination
Manu	6	"Light My Fire"	Saved by the public vote
Sandra	7	"Disco Inferno"	Eliminated

=== Gala 14 (15 July 2008) ===
- Musical guests:
  - Daniel Diges and Macarena García ("Vuela")
  - Kate Ryan ("Ella, elle l'a")
  - Soraya Arnelas ("Words")
  - Kate Ryan and Soraya Arnelas ("No Digas Que No")

Contestants' performances on Gala 14
Contestant	Order	Solo Song	Order	Duo Song	Result
Regular performances
Chipper	1	"Over the Rainbow"	6	"Fever"	Saved
Virginia	4	"Old Town"	6	"Fever"	Saved
Manu	2	"La vida es"	5	"No estamos solos"	Up for elimination
Pablo	3	"Don't Stop Me Now"	5	"No estamos solos"	Up for elimination
Up for elimination
Manu	7	"I Drove All Night"	N/A	N/A	Eliminated
Pablo	8	"¿Lo ves?"	N/A	N/A	Saved by the public vote

=== Gala Final (22 July 2008) ===
- Musical guests:
  - Mónica Naranjo ("Todo mentira")
  - La Quinta Estación ("La frase tonta de la semana")

Contestants' performances on Gala Final
Contestant	Order	First Song	Order	Duo Song	Order	Final Song	Result
Chipper	1	"Play That Funky Music"	4	"Dead Ringer for Love" (with Sandra)	N/A (already eliminated)		3rd Place
Pablo	2	"Volver"	5	"Bad Day" (with Manu)	7	"Se dejaba llevar"	Runner-Up
Virginia	3	"Tomorrow (A Better You, A Better Me)"	6	"I'll Stand by You" (with Mimi)	8	"Porque te vas"	Winner
