= Operación Triunfo series 8 =

Operación Triunfo
- Series 8
- Hosted by: Pilar Rubio
- Judges: Noemí Galera; Eva Perales
- Winner: Nahuel Sachak
- Runner-up: Álex Forriols
- Location: Parc Audiovisual de Catalunya, Terrassa, Barcelona

Release
- Original network: Telecinco
- Original release: 16 January – 20 February 2011

Series chronology
- ← Previous; Series 7 Next → Series 9

Operación Triunfo is a Spanish reality television music competition to find new singing talent. The eighth series, also known as Operación Triunfo 2011, aired on Telecinco from 16 January 2011 and had a considerably shorter run than the earlier series. Early reasons reported for this were poor ratings, but tensions and disagreements between production company Gestmusic Endemol and Telecinco have been presented as the main reason for its early discontinuation, airing its final on 20 February 2011. The season was presented by Pilar Rubio and won by Nahuel Sachak.

== Headmaster, judges and presenter ==
- Headmaster: Nina
- Judges: Noemí Galera and Eva Perales
- Presenter: Pilar Rubio

== Contestants ==
Contestant	Age	Residence	Episode of elimination	Place finished
Nahuel	19	Castelló	Gala Final	Winner
Álex	26	Valencia	Gala Final	Runner-up
Jefferson	19	Fuengirola	Gala Final	3rd
Alexandra	19	Barcelona	Gala Final	4th
Niccó	20	Tenerife	Gala Final	5th
Josh	27	Melilla	Gala Final	6th
Roxio	21	Madrid	Gala Final	7th
Naxxo	26	Barcelona	Gala Final	8th
Coraluna	21	Jaén	Gala Final	9th
Nirah	28	Barcelona	Gala Final	10th
Juan	24	Barcelona	Gala Final	11th
Moneiba	28	Gran Canaria	Gala Final	12th
Geno	29	Gran Canaria	Gala Final	13th
Ramil	28	Ares	Gala 3	14th
Charlie	17	Tenerife	Gala 2	15th
Silvia	20	Jaén	Gala 1	16th
Sira	19	Tenerife	Gala 1	17th
Alexxa	20	Gijón	Gala 0	Not selected
Miguel	26	Almería	Gala 0	Not selected

== Galas ==
=== Results summary ===
Colour key

–	Contestant received the most public votes and was exempt for nominations.
–	Contestant was up for the elimination but was saved by the Academy's staff.
–	Contestant was up for the elimination but was saved by the contestants.
–	Contestants were up for the elimination and were the nominees of the week.
–	Contestant was up for the elimination but was immediately saved by the public votes.
–	Contestant was up for the elimination but was immediately eliminated by the public votes.

	Gala 0		Gala 1	Gala 2	Gala 3	Gala 4	Final	
Nahuel	Sira	Saved	Coraluna	Jefferson	Saved	Coraluna	Finalist	Winner (Final)
Álex	Alexxa	Saved	Saved	Niccó	Saved	Niccó	Finalist	Runner-up (Final)
Jefferson	Alexxa	Saved	Saved	Saved	Saved	Niccó	Finalist	3rd Place (Final)
Alexandra	Sira	Saved	Charlie	Niccó	Saved	Niccó	Finalist	4th place (Final)
Niccó	Sira	Saved	Saved	Saved	Saved	Saved	Finalist	5th place (Final)
Josh	Miguel	Saved	Saved	Niccó	Saved	Niccó	Finalist	6th place (Final)
Roxio	Sira	Saved	Saved	Niccó	Saved	Niccó	Finalist	7th place (Final)
Naxxo	Miguel	Saved	Saved	Niccó	Favourite	Coraluna	Finalist	8th place (Final)
Coraluna	Saved	Nominated	Saved	Jefferson	Saved	Nominated	Finalist	9th place (Final)
Nirah	Alexxa	Saved	Saved	Jefferson	Saved	Geno	Finalist	10th place (Final)
Juan	Miguel	Saved	Saved	Charlie	Saved	Geno	Finalist	11th place (Final)
Moneiba	Sira	Saved	Saved	Jefferson	Geno	Coraluna	Finalist	12th place (Final)
Geno	Not in Academy		Saved	Jefferson	Saved	Nominated	Evicted (Final)	
Ramil	Miguel	Saved	Saved	Niccó	Eliminated	Evicted (Gala 3)		
Charlie	Sira	Saved	Saved	Eliminated	Evicted (Gala 2)			
Silvia	Sira	Saved	Eliminated	Evicted (Gala 1)				
Sira	Saved	Nominated	Evicted (Gala 1)					
Alexxa	Eliminated	Not selected (Gala 0)						
Miguel	Eliminated	Not selected (Gala 0)						
Up for elimination	Alexxa; Charlie; Coraluna; Miguel; Sira	Coraluna; Sira	Charlie; Coraluna; Nirah; Silvia	Charlie; Jefferson; Josh; Niccó	Coraluna; Geno; Nahuel; Ramil	Alexandra; Coraluna; Geno; Niccó	Winner	Nahuel; Most votes to win (out of 3)
Saved by Academy's staff	Charlie	None	Nirah	Josh	Ramil	Alexandra	Finalist	Álex; Fewest votes to win (out of 3)
Saved by contestants	Sira; 7 of 14 votes to save	None	Coraluna; 6 of 13 votes to save	Niccó; 6 of 12 votes to save	Coraluna; 6 of 11 votes to save	Niccó; 5 of 10 votes to save	Finalist	Jefferson; Fewest votes to win (out of 3)
Saved by public vote	Coraluna; Most votes to save	Coraluna; Most votes to save	Charlie; Most votes to save	Jefferson; Most votes to save	Geno; Most votes to save	Coraluna; Most votes to save	Finalist	Alexandra; Fewest votes to win (out of 12)
Saved by public vote	Coraluna; Most votes to save	Coraluna; Most votes to save	Charlie; Most votes to save	Jefferson; Most votes to save	Geno; Most votes to save	Coraluna; Most votes to save	Finalist	Niccó; Fewest votes to win (out of 12)
Saved by public vote	Coraluna; Most votes to save	Coraluna; Most votes to save	Charlie; Most votes to save	Jefferson; Most votes to save	Geno; Most votes to save	Coraluna; Most votes to save	Finalist	Josh; Fewest votes to win (out of 12)
Eliminated	Alexxa; Fewest votes to save	Sira; Fewest votes to save	Silvia; Fewest votes to save	Charlie; Fewest votes to save	Ramil; Fewest votes to save	Geno; Fewest votes to save	Finalist	Roxio; Fewest votes to win (out of 12)
Eliminated	Alexxa; Fewest votes to save	Sira; Fewest votes to save	Silvia; Fewest votes to save	Charlie; Fewest votes to save	Ramil; Fewest votes to save	Geno; Fewest votes to save	Finalist	Naxxo; Fewest votes to win (out of 12)
Eliminated	Alexxa; Fewest votes to save	Sira; Fewest votes to save	Silvia; Fewest votes to save	Charlie; Fewest votes to save	Ramil; Fewest votes to save	Geno; Fewest votes to save	Finalist	Coraluna; Fewest votes to win (out of 12)
Eliminated	Miguel; Fewest votes to save	Sira; Fewest votes to save	Silvia; Fewest votes to save	Charlie; Fewest votes to save	Ramil; Fewest votes to save	Geno; Fewest votes to save	Finalist	Nirah; Fewest votes to win (out of 12)
Eliminated	Miguel; Fewest votes to save	Sira; Fewest votes to save	Silvia; Fewest votes to save	Charlie; Fewest votes to save	Ramil; Fewest votes to save	Geno; Fewest votes to save	Finalist	Juan; Fewest votes to win (out of 12)
Eliminated	Miguel; Fewest votes to save	Sira; Fewest votes to save	Silvia; Fewest votes to save	Charlie; Fewest votes to save	Ramil; Fewest votes to save	Geno; Fewest votes to save	Finalist	Moneiba; Fewest votes to win (out of 12)
