= Orquesta Paris de Noia =

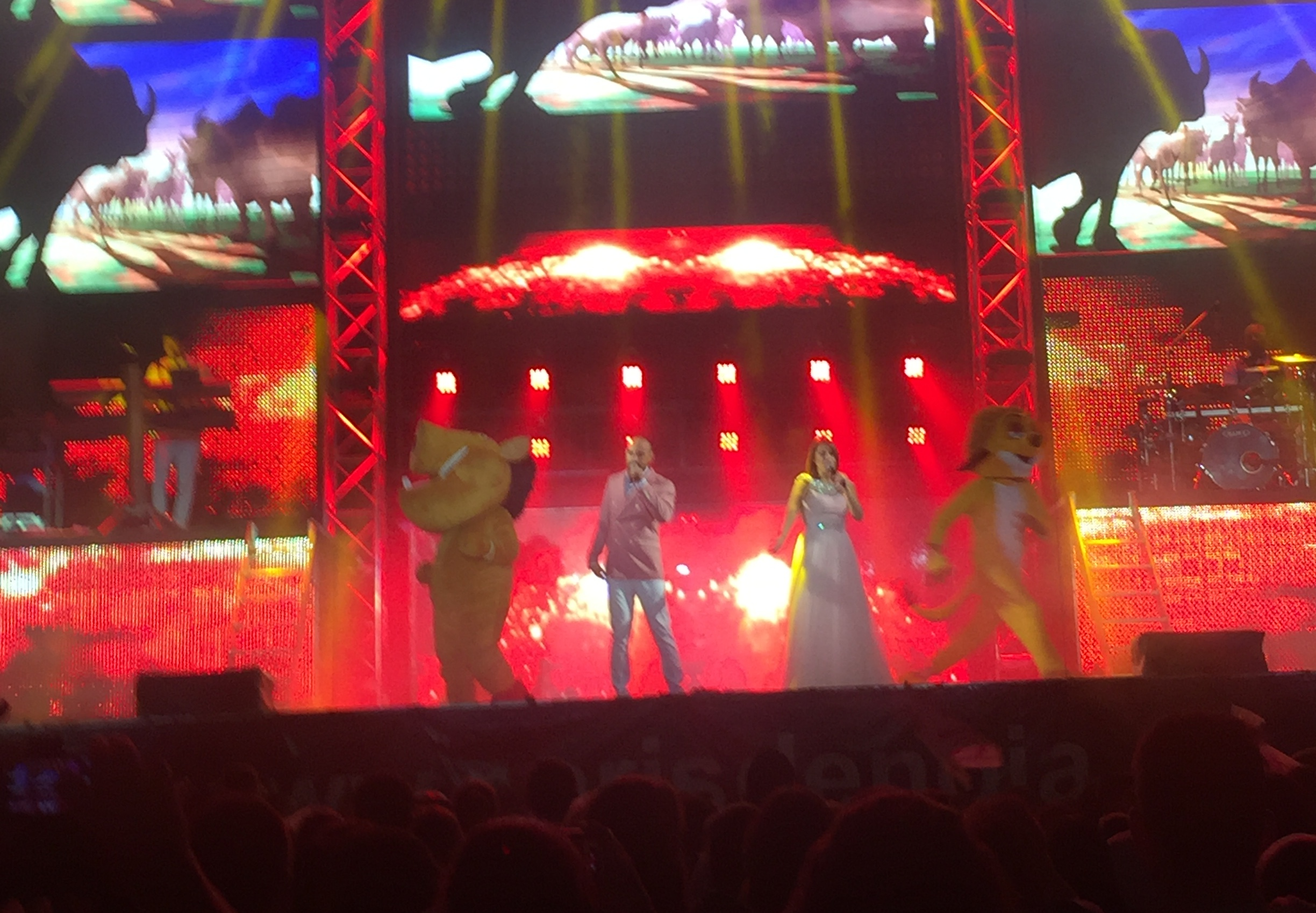

Background information
- Origin: Noia, Coruna, Galicia, Spain
- Years active: 1957–present
- Website: www.parisdenoia.es

Orquesta Paris de Noia is a band from Galicia that performs throughout the Iberian Peninsula. It is commonly referred as one of the best Orquestas along with, Orquesta Panorama, Combo Dominicano, and Orquesta Olympus. As of April 2018 they were ranked number two of all orquestas according to the Orquestas de Galicia website.

== History ==
They were founded in 1957 by Joaquín García Piñeiro. He set up an eleven-man Orquesta that included Constantino Pego, who was a famous singer at the time. The Orquesta went through various changes to appeal to different audiences. A notable change occurred in the 1980s when they started focusing on pop and rock in order to gain a younger fan base. Nowadays the Orquesta has sixteen artists on stage and a crew of twelve in charge of backstage activities. They have had famous names such as Miguel Ángel y Quin García, José Somoza, Arturo Solar, Emilio Solar, Moncho Ces, Manuel Bandin, Miro Lamas, Juan Léis, Leandro Cruz, Fernando Resúa, David Barciela Oscar Rodil, Manuel Brey, Carlos Bastón perform on their stage.

== Artists ==
As of 27 May 2018

- Genma Lareo Vieites-Spain-singer 2008–present
- Fátima Pego Vilas-Spain-singer 2012–2018
- Lucía Sanchez-Spain-singer 2019–2022
- José Antonio Blas Piñón-Spain-singer 1981–present
- Sergio Corral-Spain-singer 2010–present
- Oliver Pérez Escobar-Spain-singer 2017–present
- Zeus Rey-Spain-singer 2017–2022
- Héctor Bordón-Spain-dancer 2013–present
- Boris Jeyko Rodríguez-Spain-dancer 2017–present
- Janet Perez-Cuba-bass guitarist unknown
- Diego Moreira Villanueva-Spain-guitarist 2014–2021
- Joseph Ludwing Ruiz Zuluaga-Cuba-keyboardist 2008–2022
- Daniel Zaldívar-Cuba-battery 2017–present
- Marcos Luis Valcárcel Laguna-Cuba-percussionist unknown
- Juan Cuñarro Otero-Spain-saxophonist 2016–2022
- Juan Carlos Betancourt Rosabal-Spain-trumpeter 2014–present
- Jorge Denis Lapera-Cuba-trumpeter 2017–present
- Edward Machado -Cuba-trompetist 2008–2022
