= Leo Segarra =

Spanish singer

Leo Segarra Sánchez (born 4 February 1981), more commonly known as Leo Segarra, or simply Leo, is a Spanish singer-songwriter and TV personality, notable for his participation in Operación Triunfo 2006. Born in Valencia, Spain, Sánchez studied information technology and engineering. During time abroad in Norway he began to sing in public streets. He attended the auditions for Operación Triunfo where he ultimately competed, finishing third to Lorena.

== Discography ==
- Lo mejor de Leo (a collection of songs from the auditions and galas) - No. 2 SPA (40,000 copies sold; Gold)
- Iniciando sesion (Debut album) - No. 7 SPA (+40,000 copies sold; Gold)
- Nuevo Norte - No. 24 SPA (+24,000 copies sold; NC)

== Songs on Iniciando sesion ==
1. Estar para ti
2. Mas amor
3. Lucia (duet with Manuel España)
4. En la ciudad
5. Si aun me quieres
6. Me sigue doliendo
7. Canto
8. Sabes que estoy pensando en ti
9. Se escapan mis razones (duet with Lorena)
10. Me pones a 100
11. Celos de aire
