= Sergio Rivero =

Spanish singer (born 1986)

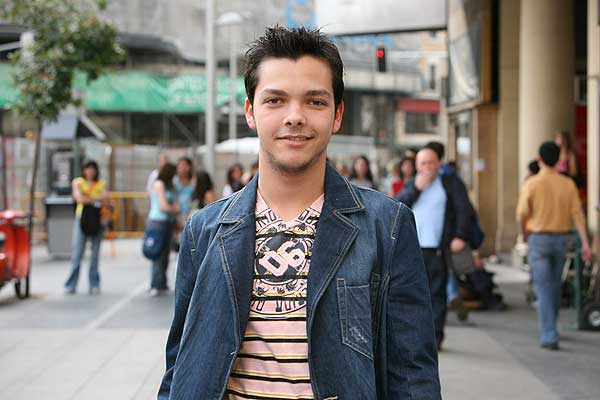

Background information
- Born: Sergio Rivero Hernández; 1 April 1986 (age 40); Las Palmas de Gran Canaria, Spain
- Genres: Pop
- Occupation: Singer
- Years active: 2005 – present
- Label: Sony BMG

Sergio Rivero Hernández is a Spanish singer born in Las Palmas de Gran Canaria, in the Canary Islands, Spain on 1 April 1986. He took part and won the title in the fourth series of Spanish version of Operación Triunfo in 2004.

== Career ==
He released two albums. The first was Quiero recorded in Madrid and Rome and released on 29 November 2005. Two singles were released from the album, "Cómo cambia la vida" and "Me envenena" the latter becoming a massive hit for him selling 150,000 copies and going platinum. The second album followed exactly a year later. Entitled Contigo, it was released on 28 November 2006, on Sony BMG going gold with 40,000 sales.

In July 2007, he registered in a musical institute in Los Angeles, California, United States to study playing the piano and composing.

Sergio Rivero joined Malú in the musical Jesucristo Superstar (Spanish version of Jesus Christ Superstar)

== Discography ==
=== Albums ===
- 2005: Quiero
- 2006: Contigo
- 2012: "Seguiré – EP"
- 2017: "Quantum”

=== Singles ===
- 2005: "Como cambia la vida"
- 2006: "Me envenena"
- 2006: "A escondidas"
- 2006: "Contigo"
- 2007: "Bajo el sol"
