= Labuat =

- Origin: Spain
- Genres: Indie, Blues, Soul, Jazz, Pop
- Years active: 2008 – 2010
- Label: Sony BMG
- Members: Virginia Maestro; The Pinker Tones; Risto Mejide
- Website: Labuat

Labuat was Spanish music band, formed in 2008 by the music duo The Pinker Tones, publicist Risto Mejide and Operación Triunfo 2008 winner Virginia Maestro.

Risto Mejide is a songwriter for the group, The Pinker Tones are the producers and Virginia contributes mainly with her vocals, although she also writes some of the band's songs and lyrics. The band was formed when Virginia won the contest OT 2008. Risto Mejide, whose songs had been composed many years ago, realized Virginia was "the voice he had been waiting for those songs for so many years" during the contest castings. Risto talked to The Pinker Tones and accorded to record the album when Virginia left the contest.

In 2009, Labuat released their self-titled debut album, which peaked at number 2 on the Spanish charts. So far, three singles, "Soy tu aire", "De pequeño" and "Carta de otoño", have been released. In May 2009 the band was the opening act for Beyoncé Knowles in Barcelona, during her I Am... World Tour.

In 2010 the band disbanded, but Virginia Maestro continued solo as Virginia Labuat.

== Discography ==
=== Albums ===
Year	Album	Chart positions	Certification
Year	Album	SPA	Certification
2009	Labuat	2	

=== Singles ===
Year	Single	Chart positions	Album
Year	Single	SPA	Album
2009	"Soy Tu Aire"	34	Labuat
2009	"De Pequeño"	–	Labuat
2009	"Carta De Otoño"	–	Labuat
