= Mario Álvarez (singer) =

Spanish singer

- Born: 19 November 1985 (age 40)
- Origin: Oviedo, Asturias, Spain
- Genres: Pop; rock
- Occupations: Singer; musician
- Instrument: Vocals
- Years active: 2000–present
- Member of: Orquesta Panorama
- Formerly of: StaticDasters, Tekila orchestra

Mario Álvarez (born 19 November 1985 in Oviedo, Asturias, Spain) is a Spanish singer. He is the winner of seventh series of Operación Triunfo in 2009, a Spanish version of Star Academy.

== Career ==
At nine, he started taking part in various entertainment castings. In 2000 when he was just 15, he became the vocalist for the punk band StaticDasters. In September 2004, he joined the Tekila orchestra. He also registered at Conservatorio de Música de Oviedo studying music and Escuela de Arte Dramático de Gijón studying acting.

In 2009, he applied for casting of musical Nino Bravo. Later on the same year was accepted as one of the finalists of Operación Triunfo. He won with a narrow margin getting 50.5% of the votes.

After touring with the other finalists. His debut single from the album is "Voy a ser yo". Starting 2014, he became a host in Orquesta Principado XXI season on Televisión del Principado de Asturias (TPA).

In 2016, he joined Orquesta Panorama.

== Discography ==
=== Albums ===
- 2009: Música (Operación Triunfo collective album)
- 2010: Voy a ser yo

=== EPs ===
- 2012: Tiempo al Tiempo
- 2013: Me equivoqué

=== Singles ===
- 2011: "Voy a ser yo"
- 2012: "Tiempo al tiempo"
- 2013: "Me equivoqué"
- 2018: "Entre tu y yo"
