= Evangelical Christian Academy (Madrid, Spain) =

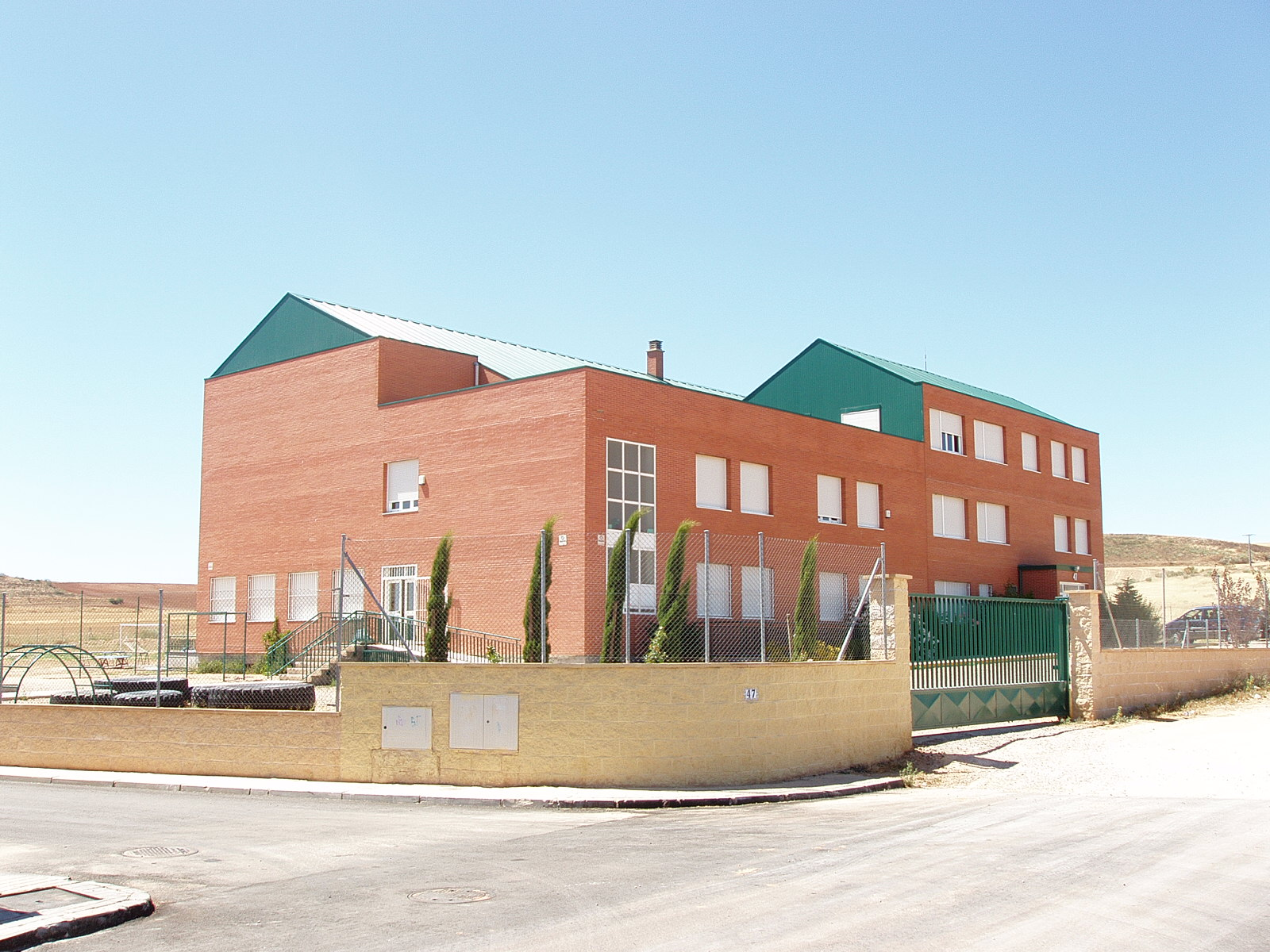

Information
- School type: International School
- Established: 1973
- Language: English
- Website: https://ecaspain.com/

The Evangelical Christian Academy (ECA) is an American international Christian school in Camarma de Esteruelas, Province of Madrid, Spain.

ECA offers grades 1 to 12.

== History ==
The school was founded in 1973.

The school earned accreditation from the Association of Christian Schools International (ACSI) in 2009. In 2018, the Spanish government recognized ECA as an American school operating in Spain and assigned it an official school number.

== Accreditation ==
ECA is currently accredited with the Association of Christian Schools International (ACSI).
