= Camarma de Esteruelas =

Camarma de Esteruelas, Spain
- Municipality
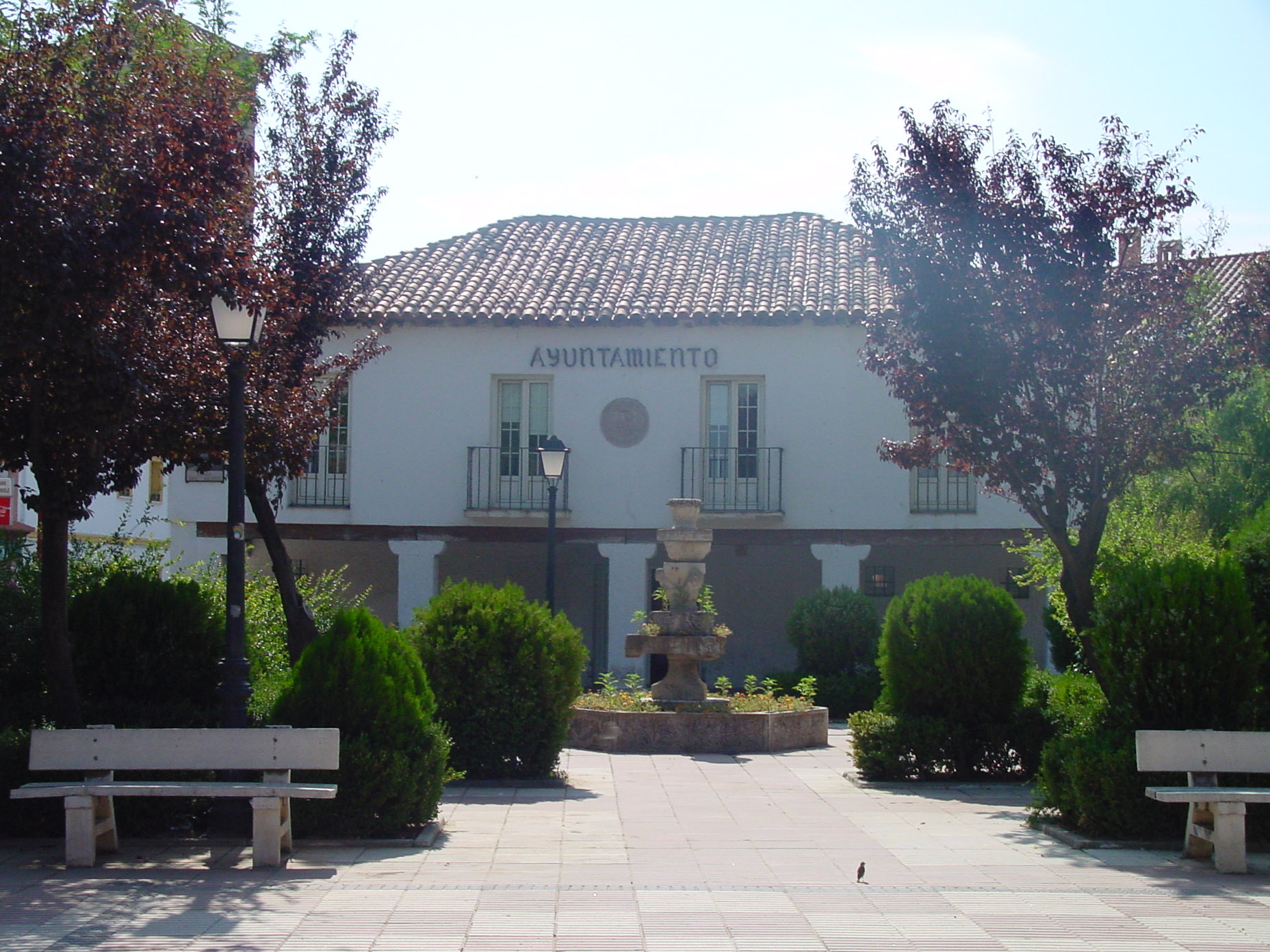
- Old City Hall.

- Coat of arms

- Location of Camarma de Estruelas in Madrid

- Location in Spain
- Coordinates: 40°32′56″N 3°22′43″W
- Country: Spain
- Community: Community of Madrid
- Province: Madrid
- Comarca: Comarca de Alcalá

Government
  - Mayor: Pedro Valdominos Horche

Area
  - Total: 35.43 km^{2} (13.68 sq mi)
- Elevation: 712 m (2,336 ft)

Population (2025-01-01)
  - Total: 8,331
  - Density: 235.1/km^{2} (609.0/sq mi)
- Demonym: Camarmeños
- Time zone: UTC+1 (CET)
  - Summer (DST): UTC+2 (CEST)
- Postal code: 28816
- Website: Official website

Camarma de Esteruelas (Spanish pronunciation: [kaˈmaɾma ðe esteˈɾwelas]) is a Spanish village and municipality in the autonomous community of Madrid in central Spain, 35 km northeast of the city of Madrid and 5 km north of Alcalá de Henares. It belongs to the comarca of Alcalá.

Sights include the church of San Pedro Apóstol.

== Schools ==
One school located in this village is the Evangelical Christian Academy (ECA). ECA was constructed in Camarma in 2002 to meet the educational needs of missionary children in the region. Another school located in the town is a bilingual elementary school called "Colegio Federico Garcia Lorca" with most courses taught in Spanish while Science is taught in English. Recently, it was built a high school for the students that these year (2014) are going to be in 1st ESO. There's no name for it yet. Some years before all the students that want to go to high school had to go to a city near called Alcalá de Henares. The names of the high school are: I.E.S. Complutense, I.E.S Antonio Machado or I.E.S Marañón.
