= Orquesta Panorama =

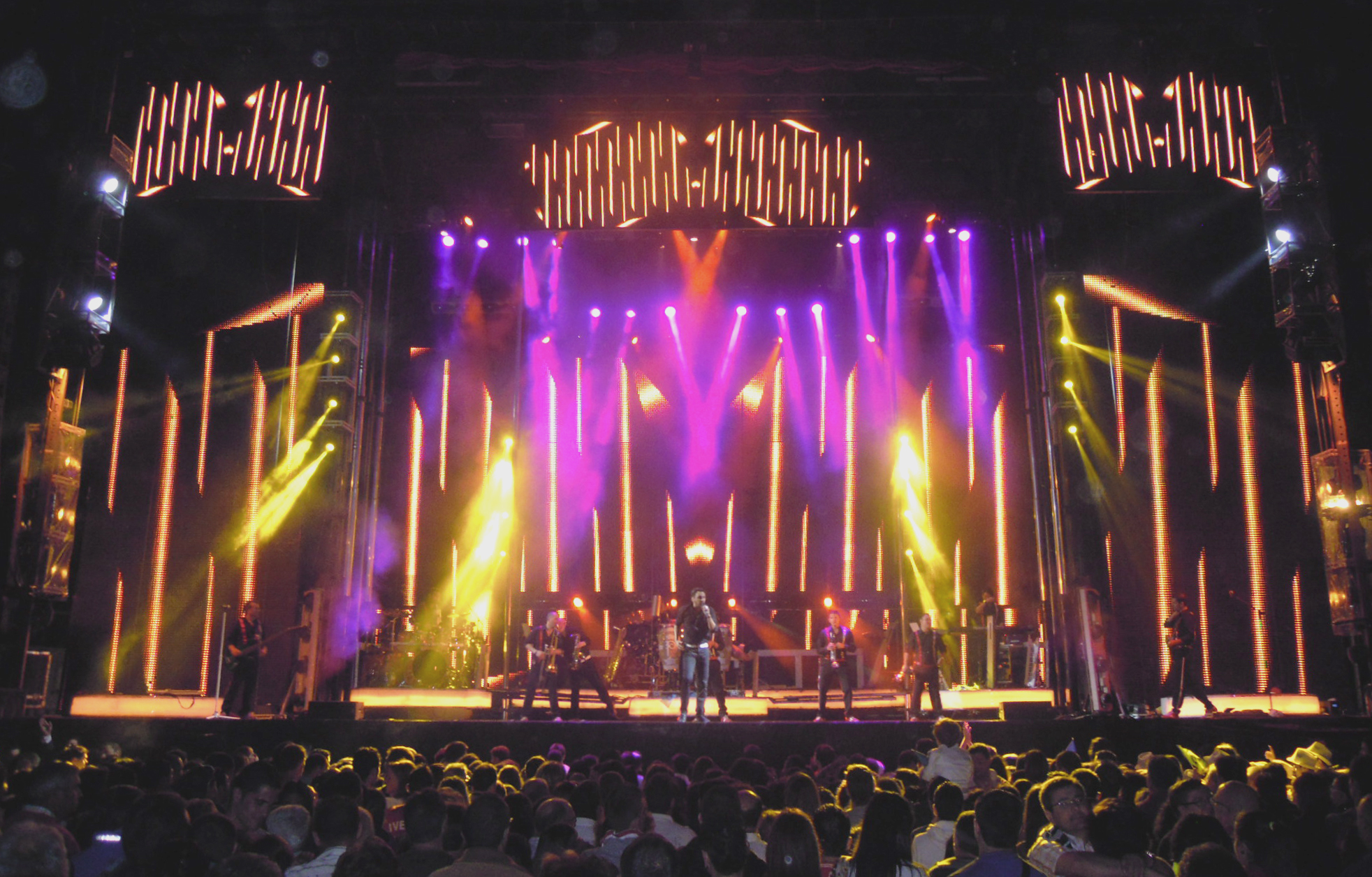

Background information
- Origin: Caldas de Reis, Pontevedra, Galicia, Spain
- Years active: 1988–present
- Website: orquestapanorama.es

Orquesta Panorama is a band from Galicia that performs through the autonomous community and other regions throughout the Iberian Peninsula.

== History ==
Orquesta Panorama was founded in 1988. It made its first performance that same year on 25 December in the municipal of O Rosal. At the time the Orquesta had eight members along with a sound team. All the musicians at the time were male and they used a van to transport the instruments along with all the members. It was not until 1993 that this band started to transform into what it is today. Manuel Garrido, otherwise known at Lito, stressed the importance of high quality sound and light systems. He also made sure that the dancers and people that played musical instruments have a greater role. Eventually they started Panorama Kids which is meant for younger children.

=== 2016 Angel Martinez Perez scandal ===
Angel Martinez Perez was the agent for approximately eighty different Orquestas including Orquesta Panorama. In 2016 Angel Martinez Perez was accused of fraud in the fiscal years 2011 and 2012. He declared that the Orquestas he represented, including Orquesta Panorama, had made a total of $4 million euros those two years when the number was closer to $50 million in reality. In 2018 he was sentenced to twelve years in prison for the $8.9 million euros of income the government lost during these years. He was able to get away with this because practically everything was paid for in cash from the performances to the performers. This left as small of a paper trail as possible. The scandal left the band's future in uncertainty until it was bought by a company in Lugo for an undisclosed amount.

== Current performers ==
- Lito Garrido-Spain-singer
- Mario Álvarez-Spain-singer
- Natalia Méndez-Spain-singer
- Daira Monzón-Spain-singer
- Eli Soal-Spain-dancer
- Reyna Fabiana GutierrezMexico-dancer
- Grabiel El Menor-Spain-dancer
- Issac Matos-Dominican Republic-dancer
- Ismael Segura-Spain-guitarist
- Jorge Ramilo Longa-Spain-bass guitarist
- Carlos Oubiña-Spain-keyboardist
- Alexandre Vázquez Roca-Spain-drums
- Edgar Oliveros-Venezuela-percussionist
- Roberto Ángel Hernández Rodríguez-Spain-trumpeter
- Andel Labori Furones-Cuba-saxophonist
- Danny Méndez Esquijarosa-Spain-trumpeter
- Xurxo Castro González-Spain-trombonist
- Kotwey Marval-Spain-trombonist
- Ivis Reyes-Spain-guitarist

== Tours and Galas ==
- 2011- Planet Tour
- 2012- Magic Tour
- 2013- Remember Tour
- 2014- Space Tour
- 2015- Game Tour
- 2016- Happy Tour
- 2017- Dreams Tour
- 2018- Deluxe Tour
- 2019- Number One Tour
- 2020- La Gira de todos vosotros Tour
- 2022- Play Tour
- 2023- Life&Music Tour
- Gala Contra el Cancer(Gala against Cancer) 2009- present
- Gala Contra el Parkinson (Gala against Parkinson) 2016- present
