= Mimi Segura =

Spanish singer

- Born: May 28, 1981 (age 44); Melilla, Spain
- Occupations: Actor; singer

Mimi Segura Ruiz (born May 28, 1981, in Melilla) is a singer and actor from Melilla, Spain.

== Biography ==
Mimi Segura was born to Segura Ruiz on May 28, 1981, in Melilla, the Spanish autonomous city located on the north coast of Africa. She has been active in the entertainment scene since 2008. She made her first appearance on the television series Operación Triunfo which run on set from 2008 to 2011. Mimi Segura is best known for her audition performance in the 2010 Eurovision contest in Oslo. She teamed up with Diana Tovar and Marta Mansilla to form a singing group that auditioned for the Eurovision contest. Although they did not make it to Oslo, they receive the highest votes locally, subsequently leading them to form the group Venus, that has had television and radio airtime to embark on musical projects. The trio released their first album "Like a Superstar" in 2011. She is also known for her appearance in the movie Gala 20 Aniversario. She is presently casting for the television series Los Mejores Años, which started airing on television in 2009.
