= Idaira =

Spanish singer

- Born: Idaira Fernández Rodríguez; 14 March 1985 (age 40)
- Origin: San Cristóbal de La Laguna (Tenerife), Spain
- Genres: Pop; Rhythm and Blues
- Instruments: Voice; guitar
- Years active: 2005–present
- Labels: Movistar; Multitrack; Cincomasmusic
- Website: Official website

Idaira Fernández Rodríguez, known professionally as Idaira, is a Spanish singer. She is a participant of the reality show Operación Triunfo (2005).

== Biography ==
She was born on 14 March 1985 in San Cristóbal de La Laguna (Tenerife). She is the youngest child, after three brothers, David, Besay and Airam. Their parents are: Balvina and Rafael. In year 2003, she tried out for the casting of the show, "OT" but was not selected. Two years later she returned to try out again with her brother Airam; he didn't pass the first round, but Idaira did. Not only did she pass the first round, but one round after another until arriving at the finales, where she competed against another 16 contestants to obtain a place in the Academy. In the so-called "Show 0", she chose Christina Aguilera's song titled Genie in a Bottle (Spanish language version literally "Captured Genie" or "Genio Atrapado"). Idaira arrived at the semi-final shows, being the favorite to win the competition. During one of the final shows in which the three finalists appeared, Idaira, who came being voted the favorite by the public to win the show, was nominated again along with Víctor.

== Fraud denunciation ==
Idaira's supporters and kindred in the Canary Islands denounced an alleged fraud in the Spanish TV show Operación Triunfo after she was eliminated. According to them, many votes were not entered for her, but for Víctor, since the votes sent through SMS to save the contestant were sent back with the message "Put the name of the offerer", "Insolvent shipment" or with a reply time of two hours. Gestmusic, the producers of the show, attributed the problems to a collapse of the telephone lines. The Spanish Organization of Consumers and Users (OCU) petitioned the Ministry of Industry for an investigation on the presumed irregularities of the voting system after they received complaints. On the other hand, others denounced that the city councils of Tenerife and La Laguna were allegedly campaigning to "Save Idaira" with public money. After her elimination from the show, the young girl promoted her single "Me lo dice el mundo", available only for mobile telephones.

== Discography ==
Information
OT Galas 0-14
- Released: 2005
- Singles:
  - Genio Atrapado
  - El Universo Sobre Mí
  - Hopelessly Devoted to You
  - The Voice Within
  - Relight My Fire
  - River Deep, Mountain High
  - Algo de Mí
  - El Sol No Regresa
  - Cada Vez Que Estoy Sin Ti
  - Killing Me Softly
  - Días de Verano
  - Lento
  - Puedes Contar Conmigo
  - Fíjate Bién
  - Inevitable
OT: Los Musicales
- Released: 2005
- Singles:
  - Felíz Navidad
  - Aquarius/Let the Sunshine In
  - No Llores Por Mí Argentina
  - Popurrí Mecano
  - Last Christmas
  - Mamma Mia
  - Hoy No Me Puedo Levantar
Las 100 Mejores Canciones de OT
- Released: 2006
- Singles:
  - Grease Megamix
  - Hair Medley
Me Lo Dice El Mundo
- Released: 2006
- Single:
  - Me Lo Dice El Mundo
Secreto a Voces feat. Skavia
- Released: 2006
- Single:
  - Ganador o Vencido
Te Encontraré
- Released: 2007
- Singles:
  - Te Encontraré
  - Nada Bueno en Mí
  - Lejos

== See also ==
- Operación Triunfo

== Web ==
- (in Spanish) Official Web Page of Idaira
- Official Web Page
- Official web page for "Te Encontraré" her first album
