= Martin Urrutia =

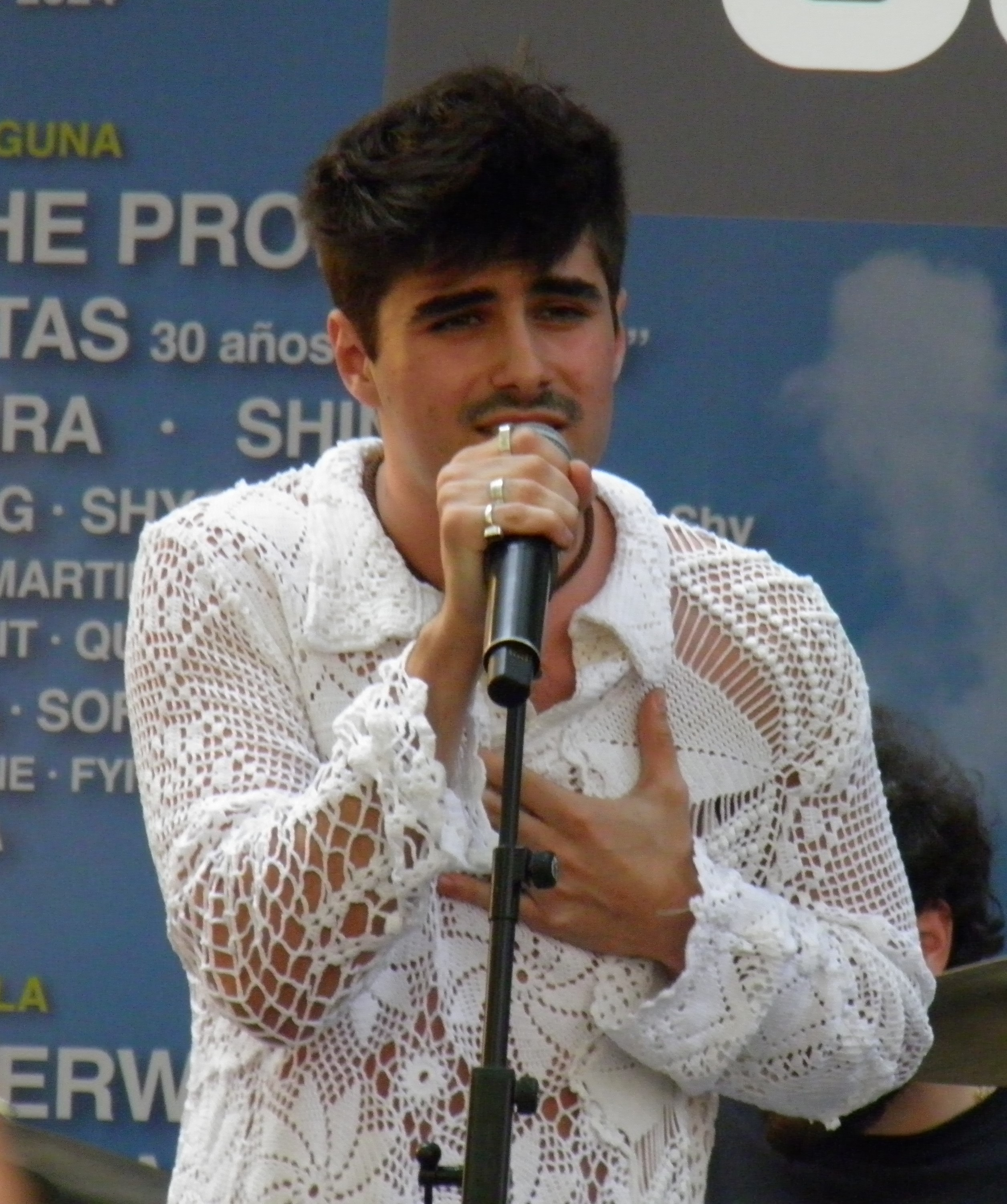
- Urrutia in 2024
- Born: Martin Urrutia Horas; 30 March 2005 (age 21); Getxo, Vizcaya, Spain
- Occupation: Singer
- Years active: Since 2023
- Musical career
- Genres: Pop; indie pop; alternative pop
- Instrument: Vocals
- Label: Universal Music Spain
- Website: https://www.youtube.com/@martinurrutiahoras

Martin Urrutia Horas (born March 30, 2005) is a Spanish singer, composer and actor who became known for being a finalist of Operación Triunfo series 12 and for his co-starring role in the musical series Mariliendre.

== Biography ==
He was born in Getxo on March 30, 2005 and is the eldest of three siblings. Martin had an interest in the performing arts from a very young age, leading him to study dance at the Roser Carrés Ballet School. After completing his baccalaureate in performing arts in Bilbao, he was accepted into Dantzerti, the Higher School of Dramatic Art and Dance of the Basque Country. He interrupted his studies at Dantzerti to join the Operación Triunfo music academy. He has had a boyfriend since December 2023, Juanjo Bona, also a contestant on Operación Triunfo.

== Musical career ==
=== 2023–2024: Appearance on Operación Triunfo ===
On November 20, 2023, he became one of the 16 contestants on Operación Triunfo 2023 after performing Somewhere Only We Know by Keane at Gala 0, making him the first official contestant of the twelfth edition.

During his time on the show he was chosen as the favorite of the week in Gala 6 after his performance of the song Alors on danse by Stromae. In Gala 8 he sang a duet with his partner Chiara Oliver of the song Escriurem by Miki Núñez and IZARO, the second time that a contestant sang in Basque in the contest, and the first time that a song was sung as a duet in Catalan and Basque. Another of his most notable performances was God Only Knows by The Beach Boys, performed with his partner and current boyfriend Juanjo Bona.

On February 12, 2024, he became a finalist on the show after performing Murder on the Dancefloor by Sophie Ellis-Bextor, with the finals being on February 19, where he finished in sixth place singing Golden Hour by JVKE.

After finishing the contest, he participated with his colleagues in the Operación Triunfo tour, with which he toured ten Spanish cities, including Bilbao. The concert he gave with his classmates at the WiZink Center in Madrid, and the changes in his life after his time at the music academy, were captured in a Prime Video documentary that premiered on September 27, 2024.

=== 2024–2025: First songs ===
Under the Universal Music Spain record label, in March 2024 he released his first single, Rompeolas, whose video clip was recorded on a beach in the Algarve (Portugal). This single entered the top 50 of Spotify Spain twice, as well as the Official Sales Charts of Music Producers of Spain Promusicae.

In May 2024, together with the other finalists of Operación Triunfo 2023, he presented and performed at the Spanish Olympic Committee headquarters La Gravedad, a song written to be Spain's official song at the 2024 Summer Olympics.

In June 2024, he released a compilation album titled Lo mejor de Martin Urrutia, which includes several of the songs he performed during his time on Operación Triunfo 2023, as well as his first single, Rompeolas. This album reached second place on the Official Sales Charts of Promusicae and remained in the top 100 for two weeks.

His first solo concert was on July 11, 2024, alongside the indie pop group El Buen Hijo, at the Bilbao BBK Live festival, where he sang his first single, Rompeolas, and covered several songs; he also sang a duet with Alba Reche. That same month, Urrutia also performed at La Casa de España in Paris in a private concert for the Spanish delegation to the games Olympics. Later, in August 2024, he gave his second solo concert during the Los 40 Aste Nagusia festival.

At the end of September 2024, Urrutia and Juanjo Bona announced El Destello, a joint effort telling their love story. The song, co-produced by Hidrogenesse, has electronic pop overtones, and the music video has a vintage black and white aesthetic with a choreographed dance with clear references to La Mesías. The song entered the Official Promusicae Sales Charts. On October 11, 2024, Urrutia was invited by Bona to perform on stage during his Los40 Pop Pilar concert at the Fiestas del Pilar in Zaragoza, where they sang El Destello live for the first time. Shortly thereafter, Martin and Juanjo announced the release of a remix version of El Destello, produced by Nacho Canut of Fangoria, and a vinyl album containing both versions.

On October 18, 2024, he covered and recorded a music video for the song Eskutitza, a charity collaboration in Basque for EITB Maratoia 2024 to raise funds for the prevention of cardiovascular diseases, under the slogan Listen to your heart. On December 12, 2024, Urrutia and Leire Martínez performed as a duo in a benefit concert at the Euskalduna Palace in Bilbao.

Between March and June 2025, Urrutia sang El Destello again alongside Bona in some of the concerts of the latter's solo tour, Tan Mayor y Tan Niño, where they also sang their version of God Only Knows a cappella. On May 31, 2025, Urrutia performed at the Bizkaia Arena as a guest artist at the end of IZARO's tour.

=== Since 2025: La insolación ===
A year after releasing his first song, in June 2025 he published Nadadora. Produced by Hidrogenesse, this single from his debut album is a cover of the San Sebastian group Family. The music video, with a homemade style and fragments recorded with a VHS camera, is a love letter to nature and an ode to childhood nostalgia.

In October 2025, he released Nuevos recuerdos, an alternative pop track featuring a melody inspired by video games, 8-bit style effects, and digital sounds. In this single, Urrutia explores the themes of nostalgia, loss, and emotional renewal, reflecting an introspective journey through memory, change, and resilience. The lyrics revolve around the need to cherish moments in order not to forget them, and how such moments can help give meaning to the passage of time and lived experiences.

In December 2025, he took part in EITB's Christmas Eve special Gabon Kantak, where he performed the carol Din dan don/Jingle Bells in basque alongside the Euskadiko Orkestra. The cover was specially arranged by composer Fernando Velázquez and Urrutia was accompanied by the Children’s Choir of the Bilbao Choral Society and the Youth Choir of the Orfeón of Pamplona.

In January 2026, he released Otro verano, a single in which he reflects on his recent summers through themes such as teenage love, uncertainty, improvisation, and the vertigo of fame.

During the 2026 Dial Awards in Tenerife, Urrutia took the stage alongside Ana Torroja to perform Cruz de navajas, paying tribute to Mecano.

In March 2026, La insolación, the highly anticipated debut album by Urrutia was announced, being released on April 10. The project sits on the margins of indie music and its title is inspired by the novel of the same name by Carmen Laforet. Produced entirely by Hidrogenesse, the album blends experimental and emotional elements, exploring new sonic textures while maintaining the intimate, nostalgic, and deeply autobiographical nature that defines Urrutia's music. The release of this first album was accompanied by Déjalo ir, a single about resistance to change that encapsulates much of his artistic approach. The launch of this debut album was accompanied by Insolación Tour, a concert tour across Spain set to begin on May, 15.

== Acting career ==
In 2023, Urrutia played an extra in the film Anathema, a horror film directed by Jimina Sabadú and produced by Álex de la Iglesia originally scheduled for theaters in November 2024.

During summer 2023, he starred in the musical version of The Picture of Dorian Gray, directed by Eva Ausín, in Madrid.

On March 20, 2024, Atresmedia announced the musical television series Mariliendre, directed by Javier Ferreiro and produced by Javier Ambrossi and Javier Calvo, in which Martin would make his debut as a co-starring actor alongside Blanca Martínez, Omar Ayuso, Carlos González, Yenesi, and Álvaro Jurado. Urrutia presented a preview of the project with his colleagues at the FesTVal in Vitoria in September 2024. He also participated in a series of presentations and panel discussions on fiction between February and March 2025, attending the Teatro Real in Madrid, to the 28th edition of the Malaga Spanish Film Festival, to the 'Media Festival' of the Universidad Carlos III of Madrid or to the eighth edition of the 'Crossover. Cultura de Series' in San Sebastián. The series consists of six episodes and premiered on Atresplayer in April 2025.

In May 2025, he participated as a special guest on the twelfth edition of Your face sounds familiar on Antena 3, where he played Ricky Martin to perform Livin' la Vida Loca.

In February 2026, it was announced Urrutia would appear in the film Kraken: The Black Book of Hours, a screen adaption of the crime novel of the same name, directed by Manual Sanabria and Joaquín Llamas, and starring Alejo Sauras and Maggie Civantos.

== Modeling and advertising ==
In May 2024, Urrutia and Juanjo Bona starred on the cover and in the main feature of the spring edition of the quarterly travel magazine Shangay Voyager. In this publication, both collaborated with the local government to promote the island as a LGBTQ tourism destination.

In September 2024, he became an ambassador for the Yves Saint Laurent brand and promoted one of its new fragrances through various social media platforms.

Urrutia has appeared in several articles for fashion and trend magazines, both in print and online, where he has discussed his artistic, musical, and acting career. The September 2024 autumn edition of Neo2 Magazine, the October 2024 issue of Vanidad magazine or the February 2025 edition of the men's magazine Risbel Magazine stand out. On the occasion of the premiere of Mariliendre, between March and April 2025, he starred in a series of covers and reports on his acting debut, including interviews in the American magazine Variety, in the Sunday supplement El País Semanal or in the magazine Nuebo.

In September 2025, he appeared in a commercial for the iced tea beverage brand Nestea to reaffirm the brand’s market presence following the end of the agreement between Nestlé and Coca-Cola. In February 2026, he starred alongside Juanjo Bona in a campaign promoting Heated Rivalry following the series’ premiere on the Spanish TV network Movistar Plus+.

In April 2026, Urrutia made his runway debut at the Barcelona Fashion Week for the brand AAA Studio.

== Recognition ==
In June 2024, Urrutia was chosen as one of the 100 most influential LGBTQ+ people in Spain. He appeared on the list again in June 2025, for the second consecutive year.

On July 3, 2024, he was the town crier of the Pride festivities LGTBIQ+ in Madrid alongside his Operación Triunfo 2023 colleagues Juanjo Bona, Chiara Oliver and Violeta Hódar in the Plaza de Pedro Zerolo.

In October 2024, he was chosen alongside Leire Martínez to promote EITB Maratoia 2024,, raising €850,000 for cardiovascular disease research.

Urrutia was one of the key figures in Shangay magazine's 2025 yearbook, which annually pays tribute to various LGBTQ+ artists by highlighting their impact as role models for new generations.

== Discography ==
=== Albums and EPs ===
==== Compilation Albums ====
Title	Details	Charts
Title	Details	Spain
The Best of Martin Urrutia	Released: June 20, 2024; Label: Universal Music; Format: CD, digital download	2

==== Studio albums ====
Title	Details	CD charts	Vinyl charts
Title	Details	Spain	Spain
La insolación	Release: April 10, 2026; Label: Universal Music; Format: CD, vinyl, digital download; Jenesaispop Rating: 7.4/10	6	2

=== Singles ===
==== As lead artist ====
Year	Song	Chart position	Album
Year	Song	Spain	Album
2024	"Rompeolas"	74	The Best of Martin Urrutia
2025	"Nadadora"	—	La insolación
2025	"Nuevos recuerdos"	—	La insolación
2026	"Otro verano"	—	La insolación
2026	"Déjalo ir"	—	La insolación

==== Collaborations ====
Year	Song	Chart Position
Year	Song	Spain
2024	"La gravedad" (with Naiara, Paul Thin, Ruslana, Lucas Curotto and Juanjo Bona)	—
2024	"El destello" (with Juanjo Bona)	94
2024	"El destello (Remix)" (with Juanjo Bona)	—

==== Soundtracks ====
Year	Song	Details
2024	"Eskutitza" (with Leire Martínez)	EITB Maratoia 2024
2025	"Amen" (with Bea Fernández, Carlos González, Nina, Omar Ayuso and Yenesi)	Mariliendre: Chapter 1
2025	"I love you more" (with Bea Fernández)	Mariliendre: Chapter 1
2025	"I want to dance" (with Bea Fernández, Carlos González, Omar Ayuso and Yenesi)	Mariliendre: Chapter 1
2025	"I'll do it for you" (with Bea Fernández)	Mariliendre: Chapter 2
2025	"Take a Vitamin" (with Bea Fernández, Carlos González, Omar Ayuso and Yenesi)	Mariliendre: Chapter 2
2025	"It Could Be" (with Bea Fernández, Carlos González, Omar Ayuso, Yenesi and Álvaro Jurado)	Mariliendre: Chapter 3
2025	"When You Go" (with Bea Fernández and Jorge Silvestre)	Mariliendre: Chapter 4
2025	"Twisting Words" (with Bea Fernández)	Mariliendre: Chapter 5
2025	"All for a Dream" (with Bea Fernández, Carlos González, Omar Ayuso, Yenesi and Álvaro Jurado)	Mariliendre: Chapter 5
2025	"It's Me + Tell Me" (with Bea Fernández, Carlos González, Omar Ayuso, Yenesi and Álvaro Almodóvar)	Mariliendre: Chapter 6
2025	"Din dan don" (Jingle Bells)	EITB Gabon Kantak

== Filmography ==
=== Film ===
Year	Title	Role	Director	Ref.
2024	Anathema	Extra	Jimina Sabadú	
2026	Kraken: The Black Book of Hours	Gael	Manuel Sanabria, Joaquín Llamas	

=== Series ===
Year	Title	Channel	Role	Notes	Ref.
2025	Mariliendre	Atresplayer	Jeremías Escudero	Co-star (6 episodes)	

=== Television ===
==== As presenter or contestant ====
Year	Title	Channel	Notes	Ref.
2023–2024	Operación Triunfo series 12	Prime Video	Contestant, Finalist	
2024	Orgullo de Madrid 2024	RTVE	Town Crier	

==== Documentaries ====
Year	Title	Channel	Notes	Ref.
2024	Gala NoGala ING OT23	YouTube	Starring (9 programs)	
2024	OT23: The Tour	Prime Video	Documentary and film, protagonist	
2025	More about Mariliendre	Atresplayer	Documentary	

=== Music Videos ===
Year	Song	Release	Notes
2024	"Rompeolas"	March 21, 2024	Main Artist
2024	"Lo que no ves de mí"	March 28, 2024	Special Appearance
2024	"La gravedad" (with Naiara, Paul Thin, Ruslana, Lucas Curotto and Juanjo Bona)	May 7, 2024	Collaboration
2024	"El Destello" (with Juanjo Bona)	October 3, 2024	Collaboration
2024	"Eskutitza" (with Leire Martínez)	October 18, 2024	Collaboration
2025	"Nadadora"	June 12, 2025	Main Artist
2025	"Nuevos recuerdos"	October 10, 2025	Main Artist
2025	"Din dan don"	December 24, 2025	Main Artist
2026	"Otro verano"	January 16, 2025	Visualizer
2026	"Déjalo ir"	April 10, 2025	Main artist

== Awards and nominations ==
Year	Country	Award	Category	Nominated work	Result	Ref.
2024	Spain	MADO Award	LGBTI Diversity	Himself (with colleagues from the OT23 collective)	Won	
2024	Brazil	BreakTudo Awards	Anthem of the year	"Rompeolas"	Won	
2025	Spain	Seriemania Awards	Best cast	Himself (with the Mariliendre cast)	Won	
2025	Spain	Aixe Getxo Awards	Aixe Gaztea	Himself	Won	
