= List of number-one albums of 2024 (Spain) =

Top 100 España is a record chart published weekly by PROMUSICAE (Productores de Música de España), a non-profit organization composed of Spanish and multinational record companies. This association tracks both physical (including CDs and vinyl) and digital (digital download and streaming) record consumption and sales in Spain.

== Albums ==
| Week | Chart date | Album | Artist(s) | Ref |
|---|---|---|---|---|
| 1 | December 29 | Desbarajuste Piramidal | El Último de la Fila | |
| 2 | January 5 | Nadie Sabe Lo Que Va a Pasar Mañana | Bad Bunny | |
| 3 | January 12 | ¡Agua! | Chanel | |
| 4 | January 19 | Sol María | Eladio Carrión | |
| 5 | January 26 | Operación Triunfo 2023:Lo Mejor (1º Parte) | Operación Triunfo 2023 | |
| 6 | February 2 | Operación Triunfo 2023:Lo Mejor (1º Parte) | Operación Triunfo 2023 | |
| 7 | February 9 | Operación Triunfo 2023:Lo Mejor (1º Parte) | Operación Triunfo 2023 | |
| 8 | February 16 | Operación Triunfo 2023:Lo Mejor (1º Parte) | Operación Triunfo 2023 | |
| 9 | February 23 | La joia | Bad Gyal | |
| 10 | March 1 | El Presente | Shinova | |
| 11 | March 8 | Operación Triunfo 2023:Lo Mejor (2º Parte) | Operación Triunfo 2023 | |
| 12 | March 15 | Estopía | Estopa | |
| 13 | March 22 | Las Mujeres Ya No Lloran | Shakira | |
| 14 | March 29 | Cowboy Carter | Beyoncé | |
| 15 | April 5 | Bolsa Amarilla Y Piedra Potente | Derby Motoreta's Burrito Kachimba | |
| 16 | April 12 | La Maqueta | Supersubmarina | |
| 17 | April 19 | The Tortured Poets Department | Taylor Swift | |
| 18 | April 26 | Sakura | Saiko | |
| 19 | May 3 | Radical Optimism | Dua Lipa | |
| 20 | May 10 | Sakura | Saiko | |
| 21 | May 17 | Hit Me Hard and Soft | Billie Eilish | |
| 22 | May 24 | Hit Me Hard and Soft | Billie Eilish | |
| 23 | May 31 | The Tortured Poets Department | Taylor Swift | |
| 24 | June 7 | Hit Me Hard and Soft | Billie Eilish | |
| 25 | June 14 | Quién Es Dei V? | Dei V | |
| 26 | June 21 | Lo Mejor de Juanjo Bona | Juanjo Bona | |
| 27 | June 28 | Quién Es Dei V? | Dei V | |
| 28 | July 5 | Mañana Será Bonito | Karol G | |
| 29 | July 12 | La Libreta Rosa | Chiara Oliver | |
| 30 | July 19 | Mañana Será Bonito | Karol G | |
| 31 | July 26 | La Libreta Rosa | Chiara Oliver | |
| 32 | August 2 | Mañana Será Bonito | Karol G | |
| 33 | August 9 | Mañana Será Bonito | Karol G | |
| 34 | August 16 | Mañana Será Bonito | Karol G | |
| 35 | August 23 | Short n' Sweet | Sabrina Carpenter | |
| 36 | August 30 | Évtasis | Edurne | |
| 37 | September 6 | Le Clique: Vida Rockstar (X) | Jhayco | |
| 38 | September 13 | Supernova | Ralphie Choo | |
| 39 | September 20 | Primera Musa | Omar Courtz | |
| 40 | September 27 | Primera Musa | Omar Courtz | |
| 41 | October 4 | Moon Music | Coldplay | |
| 42 | October 11 | Ejército de salvación | Love of Lesbian | |
| 43 | October 18 | El Club De Los Soñadores | Antoñito Molina | |
| 44 | October 25 | La Jauria | Dani Fernández | |
| 45 | November 1 | Ameri | Duki | |
| 46 | November 8 | Ameri | Duki | |
| 47 | November 15 | Cosa Nuestra | Rauw Alejandro | |
| 48 | November 22 | Buenas Noches | Quevedo | |
| 49 | November 29 | El Ultimo Día de Nuestras Vidas | Dani Martin | |
| 50 | December 6 | Buenas Noches | Quevedo | |
| 51 | December 13 | Buenas Noches | Quevedo | |
| 52 | December 20 | Todo es Posible en Navidad | David Bisbal | |
| 1 | December 27 | Buenas Noches | Quevedo | |
