= Kraken: The Black Book of Hours =

- Theatrical release poster
- Spanish: Kraken: El libro negro de las horas
- Directed by: Manuel Sanabria; Joaquín Llamas
- Screenplay by: Juan Carlos Cueto; Rocío Martínez
- Based on: El libro negro de las horas by Eva García Sáenz de Urturi
- Produced by: Víctor García; Sara Fernández-Velasco
- Starring: Alejo Sauras; Maggie Civantos; Natalia Rodríguez; Fernando Soto; Aitziber Luna; Martin Urrutia; Natalia Millán
- Cinematography: Carlos P. Gascó
- Edited by: Estefanía Mora; Tutxi Rodríguez; Lucía Palicio
- Music by: Pablo García Lozano
- Production companies: Isla Audiovisual; Zebra Producciones
- Distributed by: Vértice 360
- Release dates: 13 March 2026 (Málaga); 24 April 2026 (Spain)
- Country: Spain
- Language: Spanish

Kraken: The Black Book of Hours (Spanish: Kraken: El libro negro de las horas) is a 2026 Spanish thriller film directed by Manuel Sanabria and Joaquín Llamas based on the novel El libro negro de las horas by Eva García Sáenz de Urturi. It stars Alejo Sauras alongside Maggie Civantos and Natalia Rodríguez.

== Plot ==
It is set in between Vitoria-Gasteiz and Madrid. After receiving an anonymous call, former inspector Unai López de Ayala "Kraken" sees himself pressed to find the book Libro negro de las horas in a race against time to save his mother, teaming up with former Ertzaintza coworker Esti. Albino cop Mencía Madariaga, an officer of the Brigade of Historical Heritage of the Community of Madrid, also comes into action.

== Cast ==
- Alejo Sauras as Unai López de Ayala, "Kraken"
- Maggie Civantos as Esti
- Natalia Rodríguez as Mencía Madariaga
- Fernando Soto
- Aitziber Luna as Ítaca Expósito
- Martin Urrutia as Gael López de Ayala
- Natalia Millán

== Production ==
Developed by Rocío Martínez and Juan Carlos Cueto, the screenplay adapts the novel El libro negro de las horas (Planeta, 2022) by Eva García Sáenz de Urturi. The film is an Isla Audiovisual and Zebra Producciones (Grupo iZen) production. Shooting locations in Vitoria-Gasteiz included the Fundación Sancho el Sabio and the Plaza de la Virgen Blanca. In Madrid, the crew shot in the Barrio de las Letras, the Instituto Cervantes, and El Retiro Park.

== Release ==
The film was presented at the 29th Málaga Film Festival on 13 March 2026. Distributed by Vértice 360, it was released theatrically in Spain on 24 April 2026.

== Reception ==
In a 1-star rating, Manuel J. Lombardo of Diario de Sevilla found everything in the thriller film to "feel a bit fake and impostured" otherwise assessing every twist in the film to be over-explained.

Begoña del Teso of Diario Vasco decried "how awful, how clumsy, how flat!" is the film adaptation.

== See also ==
- List of Spanish films of 2026
