= Suzete =

São Tomé and Príncipe singer (born 2001)

- Suzete in 2024

Background information
- Born: Suzete Correia Ramos; April 21, 2001 (age 25); Saõ Tomé and Príncipe
- Genre: Afro-pop
- Occupation: Singer
- Instrument: Vocals
- Years active: 2017–present

Suzete Correia Ramos (Saõ Tomé and Príncipe, April 21, 2001), also known monomously as Suzete, is a São Toméan-Spanish singer who rose to prominence for participating in Operación Triunfo series 12.

== Background ==
Ramos grew up in the Tenerife and Portugal throughout her childhood. She states that she grew up in a family of sixteen. She studies business and administrative coaching. Prior to her musical career, she worked in retail and hospitality and braided hair.

== Career ==
As a child, Ramos performed in Canarian show Canta mi Niño. In 2017, she participated in La Voz Kids on David Bisbal's team, where she reached the battle rounds.

In 2023, she released her debut single "Blue Dress". In the same year she participated in Operación Triunfo series 12. She performed Rosalía's "Di mi nombre" during Gala 0 and was given a pass to enter the academy. A mistake in her first group performance created controversy on social media. She was eliminated in Gala 2, thus becoming the first official contestant of the edition to be eliminated. Following her elimination, she participated in the Operación Triunfo Christmas Special with her other peers, where she sang "Rockin' Around the Christmas Tree" with Chiara Oliver.

In January 2024, Ramos released her single "Kombolewa" which means "freedom" in Swahili. In March, she attended the green carpet at the Cadena Dial Awards and later on in the year attended the Spanish Music Academy Awards ceremony. Between April and July of that year, she also participated in a twelve-concert tour across ten Spanish cities with contestants from Operación Triunfo 2023.

Suzete performing at the OT tour

In July 2024, Ramos performed at the Boombastic Asturias Festival alongside Lola Índigo, where she performed her previously unreleased remix of "Kombolewa". On July 25 they released the collaboration. The remix reached 56 on PROMUSICAE top 100 songs chart. In September, she released "Machuca".

In 2025, she released her singles "Sal y agua bendita", "Paraíso" and "Damalabú". Ramos collaborated with Spanish-Brazilian artist Lua de Santana on the single "Pa que la vean", which featured on Lua de Santana's EP Ginga. In September 2025, she released her debut album Baby Wata.

In 2026, she released a new single "Ese Man" as well as a collaboration with KICKBOMBO, Chus Santana and Salma, titled "NoPasaNa". In September of the same year, she was announced as a participant for Benidorm Fest 2027.

== Artistry ==
Ramos draws inspiration from different places she grew up in, including Portugal, the Canary Islands and Spain. She performs Afro-Beat, RnB and latin pop. Her musical influences include Adele, Beyoncé and Alicia Keys.

== Discography ==
=== Albums ===
- Baby Wata (2025)

=== Singles ===
- "Blue Dress" (2023)
- "Kombolewa" (2024)
- "Kombolewa remix" (2024) with Lola Índigo
- "Mahchuca" (2024)
- "Sal y agua bendita" (2025)
- "Paraíso" (2025)
- "Damalabú" (2025)
- Ese Man (2026)

=== Collaborations ===
- "Pa que la vean" (2025) with Lua de Santana
- "NoPasaNa" (2026) with KICKBOMBO, Chus Santana and Salma
