= Operación Triunfo series 12 =

Spanish reality television music competition

Operación Triunfo
- Series 12
- Hosted by: Chenoa
- Judges: Buika; Cris Regatero; Pablo Rouss
- Winner: Naiara Moreno
- Runner-up: Paul Thin
- Location: Parc Audiovisual de Catalunya, Terrassa, Barcelona

Release
- Original network: Amazon Prime Video
- Original release: 20 November 2023 – 19 February 2024

Series chronology
- ← Previous; Series 11 Next → Series 13

Operación Triunfo is a Spanish reality television music competition to find new singing talent. The twelfth series, also known as Operación Triunfo 2023, premiered on Amazon Prime Video on 20 November 2023, presented by Chenoa. It is the first season broadcast by Amazon Prime Video, as well as the first season aired by an over-the-top streaming service instead of a free-to-air television channel.

In addition to the Galas or weekly live shows, an after show hosted by Masi Rodríguez airs after each weekly gala, and recap shows hosted by Xuso Jones are released daily. The activities of the contestants at "The Academy" or La Academia are streamed live via YouTube.

== Headmaster, judges and presenter ==
On 27 May 2023, it was announced that singer Chenoa, who rose to fame as a contestant on series 1, would be the new host for the series. Noemí Galera will continue as the headmaster of the academy. On 15 November 2023, it was announced that the judging panel would consist of singer Buika, music journalist Cris Regatero, and musician and producer Pablo Rouss, with a fourth guest judge rounding out the panel on each episode.

== Auditions ==
Open casting auditions began on 3 July 2023 in Barcelona and concluded on 19 September 2023 in Madrid.

Summary of open auditions
Location	Date(s)	Venue
Barcelona	3 July 2023	Fira de Barcelona
Zaragoza	6 July 2023	Palacio de Congresos de Zaragoza
Santiago de Compostela	10 July 2023	Pavillón Multiusos Fontes do Sar
Bilbao	12 July 2023	Bilbao Arena
Valencia	17 July 2023	Feria Valencia
Las Palmas	6 September 2023	Auditorio Alfredo Kraus
Málaga	11 September 2023	La Caja Blanca
Seville	14 September 2023	FIBES Conference and Exhibition Centre
Madrid	19 September 2023	Madrid Arena

More than 13,000 candidates participated in the open auditions.

== Contestants ==
Contestant	Age	Residence	Episode of elimination	Place finished
Naiara	26	Zaragoza, Aragon	Gala Final	Winner
Paul	21	Armilla, Andalusia	Gala Final	Runner-up
Ruslana	18	Madrid, Madrid	Gala Final	3rd
Juanjo	20	Magallón, Aragon	Gala Final	4th
Lucas	23	Vallirana, Catalonia	Gala Final	5th
Martin	18	Getxo, Basque Country	Gala Final	6th
Bea	19	San Fernando de Henares, Madrid	Gala 11	7th
Chiara	19	Ciutadella de Menorca, Balearic Islands	Gala 10	8th
Álvaro	21	Sevilla, Andalusia	Gala 9	9th
Cris	24	San Cristóbal de La Laguna, Canary Islands	Gala 8	10th
Violeta	22	Motril, Andalusia	Gala 7	11th
Álex	24	Córdoba, Andalusia	Gala 6	12th
Salma	21	Mijas, Andalusia	Gala 5	13th
Denna	22	Ogíjares, Andalusia	Gala 4	14th
Omar	26	Yunquera de Henares, Castilla–La Mancha	Gala 3	15th
Suzete	22	Santa Cruz de Tenerife, Canary Islands	Gala 2	16th
Lina de Sol	20	Vigo, Galicia	Gala 0	Not selected
Edu	26	Santa Cruz de Tenerife, Canary Islands	Gala 0	Not selected

== Galas ==
=== Results summary ===
Colour key

–	Contestant received the most public votes and became exempt from nomination. (Note: From Gala 9 onwards, the favourite of the audience no longer became exempt from nomination.)
–	Contestant received the most public votes, was up for elimination but was saved by the Academy's staff.
–	Contestant received immunity by the Academy's staff.
–	Contestant was up for the elimination but was saved by the Academy's staff.
–	Contestant was up for the elimination but was saved by the contestants.
–	Contestants were up for the elimination and were the nominees of the week.
–	Contestant was up for the elimination and was one of the nominees of the week, but was saved by the jury.
–	Contestant was up for the elimination but was immediately saved by the public votes.
–	Contestant received the fewest public votes and was immediately eliminated.

	Gala 0	Gala 1	Gala 2	Gala 3	Gala 4	Gala 5	Gala 6	Gala 7	Gala 8	Gala 9	Gala 10	Gala 11	Final
Naiara	Saved	Denna	Violeta	Salma	Salma	Alex	Bea	Bea	Paul	Lucas	Mark: 9.5	Finalist	Winner (Final)
Paul	Immune	Denna	Violeta	Salma	Salma	Nominated	Chiara	Bea	Nominated	Lucas	Mark: 8.83	Finalist	Runner-up (Final)
Ruslana	Saved	Suzete	Omar	Denna	Bea	Álvaro	Chiara	Martin	Bea	Saved	Mark: 8.17	Finalist	3rd Place (Final)
Juanjo	Saved	Denna	Violeta	Salma	Bea	Álvaro	Bea	Martin	Bea	Ruslana	Mark: 9	Finalist	4th Place (Final)
Lucas	Saved	Nominated	Alex	Salma	Alex	Alex	Bea	Cris	Paul	Nominated	Mark: 8.83	Finalist	5th Place (Final)
Martin	Immune	Lucas	Violeta	Violeta	Bea	Álvaro	Chiara	Saved	Bea	Ruslana	Mark: 8.17	Finalist	6th Place (Final)
Bea	Saved	Suzete	Omar	Salma	Saved	Álvaro	Saved	Nominated	Saved	Ruslana	Mark: 8.83	Evicted (Gala 11)	
Chiara	Saved	Denna	Violeta	Violeta	Salma	Álvaro	Nominated	Martin	Bea	Nominated	Evicted (Gala 10)		
Álvaro	Saved	Denna	Omar	Violeta	Bea	Saved	Bea	Bea	Nominated	Evicted (Gala 9)			
Cris	Saved	Lucas	Alex	Violeta	Bea	Alex	Bea	Nominated	Evicted (Gala 8)				
Violeta	Immune	Denna	Saved	Nominated	Salma	Alex	Nominated	Evicted (Gala 7)					
Alex	Saved	Denna	Nominated	Denna	Nominated	Nominated	Evicted (Gala 6)						
Salma	Saved	Denna	Violeta	Saved	Nominated	Evicted (Gala 5)							
Denna	Saved	Saved	Violeta	Nominated	Evicted (Gala 4)								
Omar	Saved	Denna	Nominated	Evicted (Gala 3)									
Suzete	Saved	Nominated	Evicted (Gala 2)										
Lina	Eliminated	Not selected (Gala 0)											
Edu	Eliminated	Not selected (Gala 0)											
Up for elimination	Álvaro; Denna; Edu; Lina	Alex; Denna; Lucas; Suzete	Alex; Denna; Omar; Violeta	Denna; Paul; Salma; Violeta	Alex; Bea; Chiara; Salma	Alex; Álvaro; Martin; Paul	Álvaro; Bea; Chiara; Violeta	Bea; Cris; Lucas; Martin	Álvaro; Bea; Paul; Ruslana	Chiara; Lucas; Paul; Ruslana	Bea; Lucas; Martin; Paul; Ruslana	Winner	Naiara; 49% to win (out of 3)
Saved by Academy's staff	Denna	Alex	Denna	Paul	Chiara	Martin	Álvaro	Lucas	Ruslana	Paul	Paul; Lucas	Winner	Naiara; 49% to win (out of 3)
Saved by contestants	None	Denna; 9 of 13 votes to save	Violeta; 7 of 12 votes to save	Salma; 5 of 11 votes to save	Bea; 5 of 10 votes to save	Álvaro; 5 of 9 votes to save	Bea; 5 of 8 votes to save	Martin; 3* of 7 votes to save	Bea; 4 of 6 votes to save	Ruslana; 3 of 5 votes to save	None	Finalist	Paul; 26% to win (out of 3)
Saved by jury	None										Martin	Finalist	Ruslana; 25% to win (out of 3)
Saved by public vote	Álvaro; 43.86% to save	Lucas; 54.1% to save	Alex; 72.4% to save	Violeta; 65.6% to save	Alex; 60.3% to save	Paul; 82.1% to save	Chiara; 59.5% to save	Bea; 52.3% to save	Paul; 65.7% to save	Lucas; 67% to save	Ruslana; 55.5% to save	Finalist	Juanjo; 13% to win (out of 6)
Eliminated	Lina; Fewest votes to save	Suzete; 45.9% to save	Omar; 27.6% to save	Denna; 34.4% to save	Salma; 39.7% to save	Alex; 17.9% to save	Violeta; 40.5% to save	Cris; 47.7% to save	Álvaro; 34.3% to save	Chiara; 33% to save	Bea; 44.5% to save	Finalist	Lucas; 7% to win (out of 6)
Eliminated	Edu; Fewest votes to save	Suzete; 45.9% to save	Omar; 27.6% to save	Denna; 34.4% to save	Salma; 39.7% to save	Alex; 17.9% to save	Violeta; 40.5% to save	Cris; 47.7% to save	Álvaro; 34.3% to save	Chiara; 33% to save	Bea; 44.5% to save	Finalist	Martin; 6% to win (out of 6)

=== Gala 0 (20 November 2023) ===
- Musical guest: Anitta ("Mil Veces")
- Guest judge: Anitta

Contestants' performances on Gala 0
Contestant	Order	Song	Result
Ruslana	1	"I Love Rock 'n' Roll"	Saved by the jury
Cris	2	"Pasos de cero"	Saved by the jury
Martin	3	"Somewhere Only We Know"	Immune by the Academy's staff
Denna	4	"A Ella"	Saved by the Academy's staff
Naiara	5	"Me Muero"	Saved by the jury
Álvaro	6	"...Baby One More Time"	Saved by the public vote
Omar	7	"Canela en Rama"	Saved by the jury
Alex	8	"Juramento eterno de sal"	Saved by the jury
Paul	9	"Way Down We Go"	Immune by the Academy's staff
Suzete	10	"Di mi nombre"	Saved by the jury
Juanjo	11	"Crazy Little Thing Called Love"	Saved by the jury
Lina	12	"Nunca Es Suficiente"	Eliminated
Edu	13	"Regrésame mi corazón"	Eliminated
Violeta	14	"Crazy"	Immune by the Academy's staff
Salma	15	"Historia de un Amor"	Saved by the jury
Chiara	16	"For Once in My Life"	Saved by the jury
Lucas	17	"De Música Ligera"	Saved by the jury
Bea	18	"Never Can Say Goodbye"	Saved by the jury

=== Gala 1 (27 November 2023) ===
- Group performance: "Libertad"
- Musical guests:
  - NIA ("Caminito de Lamento" / "Brujería")
  - Nil Moliner ("Libertad" - with the contestants)
- Guest judge: Natalia Jiménez

Contestants' performances on Gala 1
Contestant	Order	Song	Result
Cris	1	"Save Your Tears"	Saved by the jury
Ruslana	1	"Save Your Tears"	Saved by the jury
Martin	2	"Tiroteo"	Saved by the jury
Alex	2	"Tiroteo"	Nominated by the jury; saved by the Academy's staff
Álvaro	3	"Para no verte más"	Saved by the jury
Naiara	3	"Para no verte más"	Saved by the jury
Suzete	4	"Young Hearts Run Free"	Nominated by the jury; up for elimination
Bea	4	"Young Hearts Run Free"	Saved by the jury
Juanjo	5	"A tu vera"	Saved by the jury
Salma	5	"A tu vera"	Saved by the jury
Lucas	6	"Acalorado"	Nominated by the jury; up for elimination
Omar	6	"Acalorado"	Saved by the jury
Denna	7	"Padam Padam"	Nominated by the jury; saved by contestants
Violeta	7	"Padam Padam"	Saved by the jury
Paul	8	"El encuentro"	Favourite of the audience
Chiara	8	"El encuentro"	Saved by the jury

=== Gala 2 (4 December 2023) ===
- Group performance: "Alright"
- Musical guests: Vicco & Abraham Mateo ("Te quiero")
- Guest judge: Vanesa Martín

Contestants' performances on Gala 2
Contestant	Order	Song	Result
Up for elimination
Suzete	1	"A Song for You"	Eliminated
Lucas	2	"Dígale"	Saved by the public vote; saved by the jury
Regular performances
Ruslana	3	"Walk Like an Egyptian"	Saved by the jury
Chiara	3	"Walk Like an Egyptian"	Saved by the jury
Bea	3	"Walk Like an Egyptian"	Saved by the jury
Álvaro	4	"El fin del mundo"	Saved by the jury
Denna	4	"El fin del mundo"	Nominated by the jury; saved by the Academy's staff
Juanjo	5	"Leave the Door Open"	Saved by the jury
Cris	5	"Leave the Door Open"	Saved by the jury
Alex	6	"Quiero decirte"	Nominated by the jury; up for elimination
Violeta	6	"Quiero decirte"	Nominated by the jury; saved by contestants
Omar	7	"Se fue"	Nominated by the jury; up for elimination
Salma	7	"Se fue"	Saved by the jury
Naiara	7	"Se fue"	Favourite of the audience
Martin	8	"Little Green Bag"	Saved by the jury
Paul	8	"Little Green Bag"	Saved by the jury

=== Gala 3 (11 December 2023) ===
- Group performance: "Dime"
- Musical guest: Morat ("Sobreviviste")
- Guest judge: Cami

Contestants' performances on Gala 3
Contestant	Order	Song	Result
Up for elimination
Omar	1	"La canción más hermosa del mundo"	Eliminated
Alex	2	"Ladrona"	Saved by the public vote; saved by the jury
Regular performances
Juanjo	3	"Unholy"	Saved by the jury
Álvaro	3	"Unholy"	Saved by the jury
Bea	3	"Unholy"	Favourite of the audience
Ruslana	4	"Inmortal"	Saved by the jury
Martin	4	"Inmortal"	Saved by the jury
Chiara	5	"I Kissed a Girl"	Saved by the jury
Violeta	5	"I Kissed a Girl"	Nominated by the jury; up for elimination
Naiara	6	"Tómame o déjame"	Saved by the jury
Lucas	7	"Back for Good"	Saved by the jury
Paul	7	"Back for Good"	Nominated by the jury; saved by the Academy's staff
Cris	7	"Back for Good"	Saved by the jury
Denna	8	"Péiname Juana"	Nominated by the jury; up for elimination
Salma	8	"Péiname Juana"	Nominated by the jury; saved by contestants

=== Gala 4 (18 December 2023) ===
- Group performance: "Sweet Caroline"
- Musical guest: Carlos Rivera ("Para ti")
- Guest judge: Carlos Rivera

Contestants' performances on Gala 4
Contestant	Order	Song	Result
Up for elimination
Violeta	1	"Es Por Ti"	Saved by the public vote; saved by the jury
Denna	2	"Dragón"	Eliminated
Regular performances
Salma	3	"Bad Habits"	Nominated by the jury; up for elimination
Paul	3	"Bad Habits"	Saved by the jury
Bea	4	"Peces de ciudad"	Nominated by the jury; saved by contestants
Cris	5	"I Drove All Night"	Saved by the jury
Álvaro	5	"I Drove All Night"	Saved by the jury
Naiara	6	"Salvaje"	Saved by the jury
Ruslana	6	"Salvaje"	Favourite of the audience
Martin	7	"God Only Knows"	Saved by the jury
Juanjo	7	"God Only Knows"	Saved by the jury
Alex	8	"Perreo bonito"	Nominated by the jury; up for elimination
Lucas	8	"Perreo bonito"	Saved by the jury
Chiara	8	"Perreo bonito"	Nominated by the jury; saved by the Academy's staff

=== Gala 5 (1 January 2024) ===
- Group performance: "Un año más"
- Musical guest: Sen Senra ("Meu Amore" / "Uno de eses gatos")
- Guest judge: Miriam Rodríguez

Contestants' performances on Gala 5
Contestant	Order	Song	Result
Up for elimination
Salma	1	"Cuando zarpa el amor"	Eliminated
Alex	2	"Bailemos"	Saved by the public vote; nominated by the jury; up for elimination
Regular performances
Álvaro	3	"Dynamite"	Nominated by the jury; saved by contestants
Martin	3	"Dynamite"	Nominated by the jury; saved by the Academy's staff
Paul	4	"La vida moderna"	Nominated by the jury; up for elimination
Juanjo	4	"La vida moderna"	Saved by the jury
Cris	5	"Stumblin' In"	Saved by the jury
Chiara	5	"Stumblin' In"	Favourite of the audience
Lucas	6	"Corazón hambriento"	Saved by the jury
Naiara	6	"Corazón hambriento"	Saved by the jury
Ruslana	7	"SloMo"	Saved by the jury
Bea	8	"Only You"	Saved by the jury
Violeta	8	"Only You"	Saved by the jury

=== Gala 6 (8 January 2024) ===
- Group performance: "Quevedo: Bzrp Music Sessions, Vol. 52"
- Musical guest: Veintiuno ("La Toscana")
- Guest judge: Edurne

Contestants' performances on Gala 6
Contestant	Order	Song	Result
Up for elimination
Alex	1	"Contigo"	Eliminated
Paul	2	"When the Party's Over"	Saved by the public vote; saved by the jury
Regular performances
Lucas	3	"Eye of the Tiger"	Saved by the jury
Bea	3	"Eye of the Tiger"	Nominated by the jury; saved by contestants
Juanjo	4	"I Put a Spell on You"	Saved by the jury
Ruslana	4	"I Put a Spell on You"	Saved by the jury
Naiara	5	"El Farsante"	Saved by the jury
Cris	5	"El Farsante"	Saved by the jury
Álvaro	6	"Flowers"	Nominated by the jury; saved by the Academy's staff
Violeta	6	"Flowers"	Nominated by the jury; up for elimination
Chiara	7	"Mía"	Nominated by the jury; up for elimination
Martin	8	"Alors on danse"	Favourite of the audience

=== Gala 7 (15 January 2024) ===
- Group performance: "Just Can't Get Enough"
- Musical guest: Chanel ("Agua")
- Guest judge: Rozalén

Contestants' performances on Gala 7
Contestant	Order	Song	Result
Up for elimination
Chiara	1	"The Climb"	Saved by the public vote; saved by the jury
Violeta	2	"Blue Lights"	Eliminated
Regular performances
Paul	3	"Ptazeta: Bzrp Music Sessions, Vol. 45"	Saved by the jury
Ruslana	3	"Ptazeta: Bzrp Music Sessions, Vol. 45"	Saved by the jury
Juanjo	4	"La Nave del Olvido"	Favourite of the audience
Bea	5	"Sweet but Psycho"	Nominated by the jury; up for elimination
Naiara	5	"Sweet but Psycho"	Saved by the jury
Martin	6	"Tenía tanto que darte"	Nominated by the jury; saved by contestants
Álvaro	7	"Please Don't Go"	Saved by the jury
Cris	8	"Todo de Ti"	Nominated by the jury; up for elimination
Lucas	8	"Todo de Ti"	Nominated by the jury; saved by the Academy's staff

=== Gala 8 (22 January 2024) ===
- Group performance: "Believe"
- Musical guest: Emilia ("La_Original.mp3")
- Guest judge: Emilia
- This is the last Gala of the season where the favorite of the audience is granted immunity.

Contestants' performances on Gala 8
Contestant	Order	Song	Result
Up for elimination
Cris	1	"¿Y cómo es él?"	Eliminated
Bea	2	"Make You Feel My Love"	Saved by the public vote; nominated by the jury; saved by contestants
Regular performances
Juanjo	3	"Miénteme"	Saved by the jury
Chiara	4	"Escriurem"	Saved by the jury
Martin	4	"Escriurem"	Saved by the jury
Naiara	5	"La Gata Bajo la Lluvia"	Saved by the jury
Ruslana	6	"Miamor"	Nominated by the jury; saved by the Academy's staff
Lucas	7	"One Way or Another"	Favourite of the audience
Álvaro	8	"Amapolas"	Nominated by the jury; up for elimination
Paul	8	"Amapolas"	Nominated by the jury; up for elimination

=== Gala 9 (29 January 2024) ===
- Group performance: "Solo quiero bailar"
- Musical guests: Abraham Mateo & Omar Montes ("Falsos recuerdos")
- Guest judge: Abraham Mateo

Contestants' performances on Gala 9
Contestant	Order	Song	Result
Up for elimination
Álvaro	1	"I Want Love"	Eliminated
Paul	2	"Milo J: Bzrp Music Sessions, Vol. 57"	Saved by the public vote; nominated by the jury; saved by the Academy's staff
Regular performances
Martin	3	"Footloose"	Saved by the jury
Juanjo	4	"La cigarra"	Saved by the jury
Naiara	4	"La cigarra"	Favourite of the audience; saved by the jury
Ruslana	5	"Beggin'"	Nominated by the jury; saved by contestants
Lucas	6	"Nada cambiará mi amor por ti"	Nominated by the jury; up for elimination
Bea	7	"River Deep – Mountain High"	Saved by the jury
Chiara	8	"Kill Bill"	Nominated by the jury; up for elimination

=== Gala 10 (5 February 2024) ===
- Group performance: "We Are Young"
- Musical guest: Dani Fernández ("Solo tienes que avisar" / "Todo cambia")
- For this Gala, instead of the usual nominations, each jury member gave marks out of 10 to each contestant and the two with the highest combined marks would qualify for the final; the Academy's staff then selected a third finalist, leaving the remaining contestants up for elimination.

Contestants' performances on Gala 10
Contestant	Order	Song	Result
Up for elimination
Lucas	1	"I Don't Want to Miss a Thing"	Saved by the public vote; up for elimination
Chiara	2	"You Oughta Know"	Eliminated
Regular performances
Naiara	3	"Despechá"	Saved by the jury; Finalist
Martin	4	"Ya no te hago falta"	Up for elimination
Paul	5	"Paenamorar"	Favourite of the audience; saved by the Academy's staff; Finalist
Ruslana	6	"El mundo"	Up for elimination
Juanjo	7	"Take On Me"	Saved by the jury; Finalist
Bea	8	"Se acabó"	Up for elimination

Detailed Jury Marks
Contestant	P. Rouss	C. Regatero	Buika	Total
Bea	9.5	9	8	26.5
Juanjo	9	9	9	27
Lucas	9	8.5	9	26.5
Martin	8.5	8	8	24.5
Naiara	9.5	9.5	9.5	28.5
Paul	9	9	8.5	26.5
Ruslana	8.5	8.5	7.5	24.5

=== Gala 11 (12 February 2024) ===
- Group performance: "Aire"
- Musical guests:
  - Álvaro de Luna ("Hoy festejo")
  - Pablo López ("Mira cómo bailan")

Contestants' performances on Gala 11
Contestant	Order	Song	Result
Martin	1	"Murder on the Dancefloor"	Saved by the jury; Finalist
Lucas	2	"Mariposa tecknicolor"	Saved by the Academy's staff; Finalist
Bea	3	"Bette Davis Eyes"	Eliminated
Ruslana	4	"La Balada"	Saved by the public vote; Finalist
Paul	5	"Fiebre"	Already qualified
Juanjo	6	"El patio"	Already qualified
Naiara	7	"Let's Get Loud"	Already qualified; favourite of the audience

=== Gala Final (19 February 2024) ===
- Group performances:
  - "Last Dance" (with Chenoa)
  - "Historias por contar" (all sixteen contestants)
- Musical guests:
  - Lola Índigo ("1000 cosas" / "Casanova" / " El tonto")
  - Ana Mena ("Madrid City")
- After the first round of performances, the top three finalists will reprise their Gala 0 song.

Contestants' performances on Gala Final
Contestant	Order	Final Song	Order	Gala 0 Song	Result
Lucas	1	"Pillowtalk"	N/A (Already eliminated)		5th place
Paul	2	"Baby Hello"	8	"Way Down We Go"	Runner-up
Martin	3	"Golden Hour"	N/A (Already eliminated)		6th place
Naiara	4	"Sobreviviré"	7	"Me Muero"	Winner
Ruslana	5	"Zombie"	9	"I Love Rock 'n' Roll"	3rd place
Juanjo	6	"Without You"	N/A (Already eliminated)		4th place

== Specials ==
=== Gala de Navidad (25 December 2023) ===
- Group performances:
  - "Navidad, Navidad" (with the Academy's staff)
  - "Happy Xmas (War Is Over)" (with Chenoa, Xuso Jones, Masi, and the Barcelona Gay Men's Chorus)

Contestants' performances on Gala de Navidad
Contestant	Order	Song
Violeta	1	"Santa's Coming for Us"
Denna	1	"Santa's Coming for Us"
Juanjo	2	"It's the Most Wonderful Time of the Year"
Álvaro	2	"It's the Most Wonderful Time of the Year"
Bea	3	"Te regalo"
Ruslana	3	"Te regalo"
Omar	4	"High"
Paul	4	"High"
Salma	5	"Farolito (Little Star)"
Naiara	5	"Farolito (Little Star)"
Cris	6	"Last Christmas"
Martin	6	"Last Christmas"
Alex	7	"Bendita tu luz"
Lucas	7	"Bendita tu luz"
Chiara	8	"Rockin' Around the Christmas Tree"
Suzete	8	"Rockin' Around the Christmas Tree"

== Tour ==
Following the finale, all 16 contestants will reunite for a tour across arenas and stadiums in Spain, performing live.

Dates of OT23 en concierto
Date	City	Venue
27 April 2024	Bilbao	Bizkaia Arena
18 May 2024	Fuengirola	Marenostrum Fuengirola
24 May 2024	Murcia	Plaza de Toros
1 June 2024	Barcelona	Palau Sant Jordi
2 June 2024	Barcelona	Palau Sant Jordi
13 June 2024	Sevilla	Estadio de La Cartuja
15 June 2024	Granada	El Cortijo del Conde
21 June 2024	Zaragoza	Ciudad Expo
27 June 2024	Madrid	WiZink Center
28 June 2024	Madrid	WiZink Center
6 July 2024	El Puerto de Santa María	Plaza de Toros
13 July 2024	Valencia	Estadio Ciutat de València
