= Mariliendre =

- Promotional release poster
- Created by: Javier Ferreiro
- Written by: Javier Ferreiro; Paloma Rando; Carmen Aumedes
- Starring: Blanca Martínez Rodrigo; Martin Urrutia; Omar Ayuso; Carlos González; Yenesi; Álvaro Jurado; Mariona Terés; Jorge Silvestre; Mariano Peña; Nina
- Music by: Pablo Lluch; Vic Mirallas
- Country of origin: Spain
- Original language: Spanish

Production
- Executive producers: Montse García; Andrea H. Catalá
- Producers: Javier Ambrossi; Javier Calvo
- Cinematography: Lali Rubio; Andreu Adam
- Production companies: Atresmedia TV; Suma Content

Original release
- Network: Atresplayer
- Release: 27 April 2025

Mariliendre (Note: A Spanish-language gay slang term for a woman who frequents the friendship of gay men. Literally 'fag-nit'. Cf. fag hag.) is a Spanish musical comedy-drama television series created by Javier Ferreiro. It stars Blanca Martínez Rodrigo. It was released on 27 April 2025 on Atresplayer.

== Plot ==
Living a dull existence, Meri Román reunites with her former entourage of gay friends ten years after her height as a diva of the Madrid gay scene.

== Cast ==
- Blanca Martínez Rodrigo as Meri Román
- Martin Urrutia as Jere
- Omar Ayuso as Luis
- Carlos González as Saúl
- Yenesi as Leo
- Álvaro Jurado
- Mariona Terés
- Jorge Silvestre
- Mariano Peña
- Nina

== Production ==
Mariliendre is an Atresplayer original series produced by Atresmedia TV alongside Suma Content.

== Release ==
The series received a pre-screening as the closing title of the 28th Málaga Film Festival on 22 March 2025. The first two episodes were scheduled for a limited theatrical release in Spain on 24 April 2025 by Beta Fiction Spain, ahead of the series' 27 April streaming debut on Atresplayer.

== Accolades ==
Year	Award	Category	Nominee(s)	Result	Ref.
2026	27th Iris Awards	Best Production — Fiction	Javier Ambrossi, Javier Calvo	Nominated	
2026	27th Iris Awards	Best Direction — Fiction	Javier Ferreiro	Nominated	
2026	27th Iris Awards	Best Screenplay — Fiction	Javier Ferreiro, Paloma Rando, Carmen Aumendes	Nominated	
2026	37th GLAAD Media Awards	Spanish-language Outstanding Scripted Television Series		Won	

== See also ==
- 2025 in Spanish television
