= Juanjo Bona =

Spanish singer

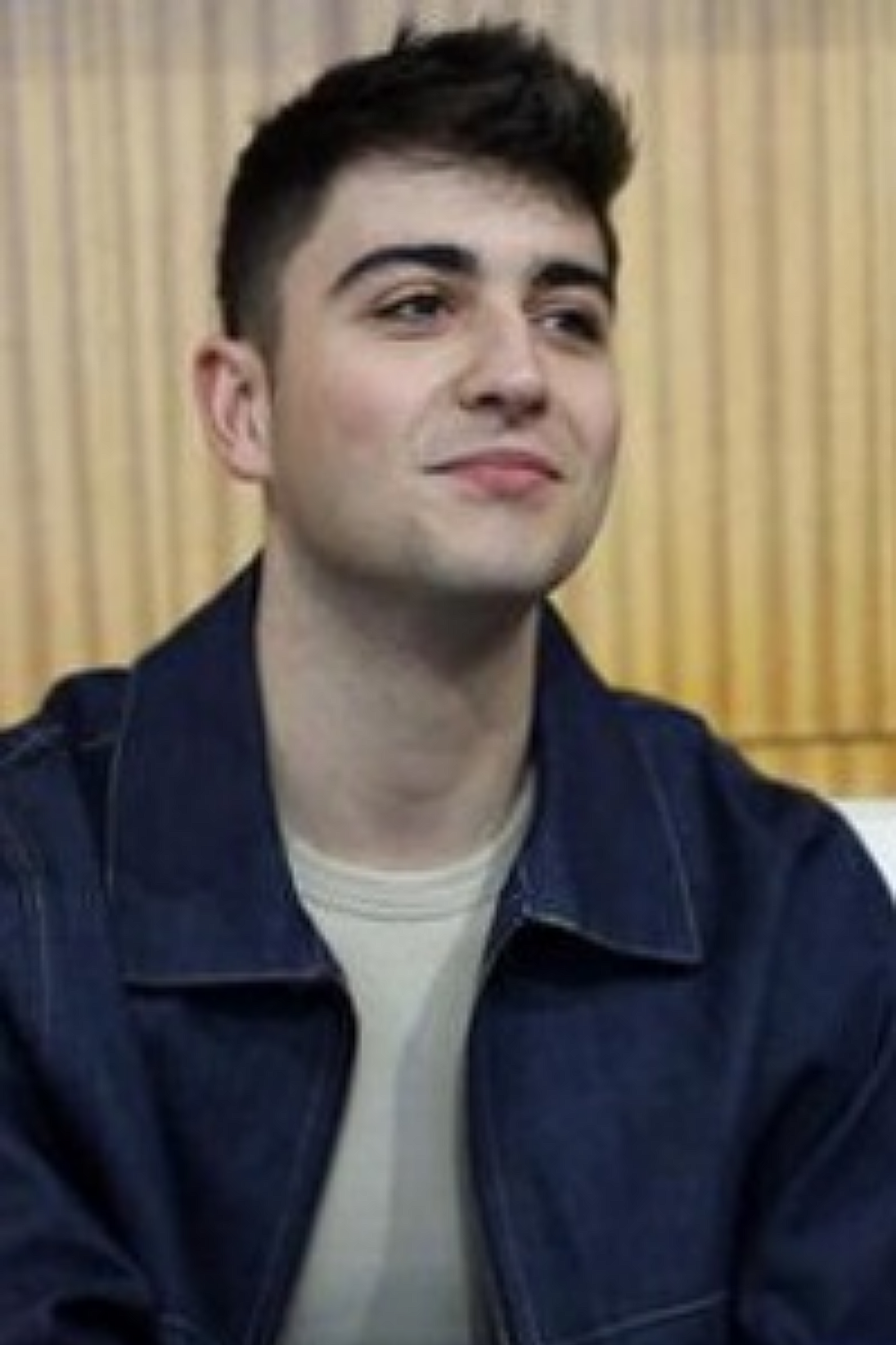
- Bona in 2024
- Born: Juan José Bona Arregui; 10 November 2003 (age 21); Magallón, Aragón, Spain
- Occupation: Singer
- Years active: 2017–present
- Musical career
- Genres: Pop; folk music; indie pop
- Instrument: Vocals
- Labels: Universal Music Spain
- Website: https://www.youtube.com/@JuanjoBonaOficial

Juan José Bona Arregui (Magallón, 10 November 2003), better known as Juanjo Bona, is a Spanish singer, jota performer, and composer who became known after winning the first edition of Jotalent and being a finalist at Operación Triunfo series 12.

== Biography ==
He was born in Magallón, Zaragoza, on 10 Noviembre 2003. He has a brother 3 years his junior. He took classes in singing, vocal technique, solfège, and the jota at a very young age, at the same time he learned to play the clarinet at the Escuela de Música de Magallón.

At 17, he moved to Madrid to study Naval and Ocean Engineering at Technical University of Madrid, a career he quit to join Operación Triunfo series 12.

During his years in Madrid, he studied at 'SOM Academy, Escuela de Musicales y Artes Escénicas', and took part in a Cabaret performance.

Since December 2023, he has been in a relationship with fellow Operación Triunfo series 12 contestant Martin Urrutia, whom he met on the show.

== Musical trajectory ==
=== 2014-2022: First steps and time at Jotalent ===
Learned in Aragonese folklore, during his childhood and adolescence he won numerous jota contests celebrated in Aragón.

In July 2017, the Magallón council released a CD with jotas sung by him in acknowledgement of his musical trajectory.

During Summer 2019, he took part in the Aragón TV talent show Tres Minutos, where he reached the semifinals.

In September 2020, he took part in Idol Kids show during casting phase of Gala 4. He received the unanimous support of the jury but did not obtain a high enough grade to pass on to the next phase.

In 2022, he competed in the first edition of Jotalent on Aragón TV, where he came out the winner. During the show, he performed numerous jotas, his version of Pulida Magallonera being especially successful, and songs of other genres such as The Show Must Go On and It's a Man's Man's Man's World. After his victory at Jotalent, he was invited to many Aragón TV shows, among them Vanity Farm: Revolución en la granja, where he dedicated a jota to a chicken, and A escampar la boira, in an episode dedicated to the importance of the jota and its interest in being declared Intangible cultural heritage. After the contest, he abandoned his two-year job as a singer at the 'Éxito' orchestra, and began to perform solo in some Aragonese towns.

On 15 October 2022, Aragón Radio assembled a concert during the Fiestas del Pilar, where Bona performed along the other semifinalists of the first edition of Jotalent, the group Artistas del Gremio and the Zaragozan duo Fresquito y Mango.

=== 2023-2024: Operación Triunfo ===
On 20 November 2023, he became one of the 16 contestants of Operación Triunfo series 12 after performing in Gala 0 Crazy Little Thing Called Love, in the Michael Bublé version.

During his participation, he was elected the week's favorite in Gala 7 after his performance of La nave del olvido de José José.

Two of his most memorable performances during the show were God Only Knows by The Beach Boys, performed as a duet with his boyfriend and song partner Martin Urrutia in Gala 4, and El patio by Pablo López, solo, in Gala 11. Both songs were included in the repertoire of the 12 concerts of the Gira de OT 2023 (OT 2023 Tour).

After finishing the competition, in February 2024 he joined fellow OT 2023 contestant Paul Thin to sing La vida moderna at another band's concert at the Sala La Riviera. He also participated with his 15 companions in a 12-concert tour of Operación Triunfo 2023, with which they toured 10 Spanish cities. The concert they gave at the WiZink Center in Madrid, and the changes in Bona's life after his time at the music academy, were captured in a Prime Video documentary that premiered in September 2024.

=== 2024-present: First singles and Recardelino ===
After leaving the music contest, he signed his first record deal with Universal Music Spain, and released his first single, Lo que no ves de mí, in March 2024. This single entered the top 50 of Spotify Spain, as well as the Official Sales Charts of Promusicae where it remained for two weeks.

In May 2024, Bona and the finalists of Operación Triunfo 2023 presented and performed at the Spanish Olympic Committee headquarters La Gravedad, a song written to be the official song of Spain at the 2024 Summer Olympics.

Between April and June 2024, he was a guest judge on the third edition of Jotalent, where in its final gala he also performed a preview of what would be his second single, Mis tías.

In June 2024, he released Lo mejor de Juanjo Bona, a compilation album including several of the songs performed during his time on Operación Triunfo 2023, as well as his first single, Lo que no ves de mí. This album reached number one on the Listas Oficiales de Ventas de Promusicae (Promusicae Official Sales Charts) and remained among the top 100 best-sellers for two weeks. That same month, he was invited by David Bisbal to sing Culpable at his concert at the Wizink Center.

In July 2024, he released his second single, Mis tías, a jota with a pop flair written by himself and two members of the group El Buen Hijo, and which is dedicated to the workers of the dormitory where he resided while he studied at college. The video clip was recorded at school grounds and stars Bona and other workers who appear dressed in baturras. This single entered the Spotify Spain top 50 twice as well as the top 100 of las Listas Oficiales de Ventas de Promusicae. After the release of Mis tías, Bona confirmed he was preparing his first album, centered on Aragonese folklore.

On July 27, 2024, Bona performed at La Casa de España in Paris, where he sang La Gravedad in a private concert for the Spanish delegation of Olympic games.

At the end of September 2024, Bona and Martin Urrutia announced El Destello, a joint effort about their love story. Co-produced by Hidrogenesse, it came to light on October 4, 2024. The song contains different strains of electronic pop, and the videoclip has a vintage aesthetic in white and black with a dance choreographed with clear references to La Mesías. The collaboration entered the Official Promusicae sales charts. Shortly thereafter, Juanjo and Martin Urrutia announced the release of a remix version of El Destello, produced by Nacho Canut of Fangoria, and a vinyl record containing both versions.

During the Fiestas del Pilar in October 2024, he was invited by Edurne to sing Tal vez at her concert in Zaragoza. Later, Juanjo gave his first solo concert in Los 40 Pilar Pop, where he sang Mis tías and presented a new single, Moncayo. During this concert, Martin Urrutia also came on stage to sing El Destello together live for the first time.

At the end of November 2024, he officially released Moncayo, an ode to his roots and childhood paying homage to the mountain that can be seen from his home in Magallón.

In January 2025, on Cadena Dial, he launched Golondrinas, which was released shortly after on all digital platforms along with its video clip. At the end of that month, Bona introduced it in a live performance on Late Xou. This new single, which follows in the footsteps of previous ones with traditional sounds of Aragonese folklore, is a song on farewells and returns, where the nostalgia for home and the need to find refuge in the midst of change are sensitively captured.

In February 2025, he released Virgen de Magallón, one last single before the release of Recardelino, the debut album of the Aragonese singer released on March 7, 2025. In it, he fuses pop with folklore — in particular, the Aragonese jota — and traditional sounds. The release of this first studio album was supported by Tan Mayor y Tan Niño, a tour of concerts in theaters throughout Spain that started on March 8, 2025. Intended to promote his debut album, the tour was initially announced for 10 dates throughout Spain, between March and May 2025. Due to great reception by the public, more dates were gradually added, up to a total of 22 concerts between March and July 2025, including several festivals. Each concert of the tour was divided by three interludes, in reference to the three stages of Recardelino: a first one representing his childhood and his town, a second one representing his departure to study in Madrid and a last one representing love.

In May 2025, he was invited by Amaral to sing Toda la noche en la calle at the band's concert in Zaragoza.

== Other projects ==
Apart from his musical career, his first television appearance was in 2016, in Gala 0 of the fourth season of Masterchef Junior, where he was eliminated in the initial casting.

In December 2024, he starred in a comedy sketch in a Christmas Eve special on the show Oregón TV. Breakfasting with, playing himself. In said show it was confirmed that Bona would be one of the presenters of the end of the new year's chimes, along with Miki Nadal and Blanca Liso, on Aragón TV.

In May 2025, his participation as a contestant on the tenth edition of the cooking competition MasterChef Celebrity was confirmed.

In September 2025, Bona will perform at the Roig Arena alongside several artists in a tribute concert to mark the 80th anniversary of the birth of the singer Nino Bravo.

== Modeling and Advertising ==
In May 2024, Juanjo and his boyfriend and OT partner, Martin Urrutia, graced the cover and main feature of the spring edition of the quarterly travel magazine Shangay Voyager. In this publication, both collaborated with the local government to promote the island as an LGBTBIQ+ tourist destination.

In July and November 2024, he collaborated with a well-known fast food restaurant chain to promote gourmet hamburgers by chef Dabiz Muñoz.

During September 2024, he was an ambassador for beer brand Ámbar to promote it during the Fiestas del Pilar. That same month, Bodegas Care launched a bottle of wine dedicated to Bona and Naiara Moreno as the town criers of the festivities.

In January 2025, he became a brand ambassador for Yves Saint Laurent for its Valentine's Day campaign, promoting one of its new fragrances on TikTok.

He graced the cover of the March 2025 issue of music magazine Nuebo, where he was interviewed about his debut album Recardelino. The interview addresses his importance in the music scene, his musical references and his roots.

== Recognition ==
On March 3, 2024, he performed the honorary kick-off alongside his Operación Triunfo 2023 teammate Naiara Moreno at La Romareda before the Real Zaragoza match against Sociedad Deportiva Amorebieta.

On June 4, 2024, he was invited to perform at the 30th edition of the Aragonese of the Year gala, where he performed Mis tías live for the first time.

He was chosen along with his boyfriend Martin Urrutia as one of the most influential LGBTQ+ people in Spain in 2024.

On July 3, 2024, he was the town crier for the Madrid LGTBIQ+ Pride festivities alongside his Operación Triunfo 2023 colleagues Martin Urrutia, Chiara Oliver and Violeta Hódar in the Plaza de Pedro Zerolo.

On September 1, 2024, he was invited to the 2024 Aragon motorcycle Grand Prix to sing the Aragon anthem moments before the start of the race.

On October 5, 2024, he gave the opening speech for the Fiestas del Pilar in Zaragoza, along with Naiara Moreno.

In January 2025, he was included in Vevo Spain's Newcomers 2025 list, which includes the 20 most emerging artists on the national scene.

== Discography ==
=== Albums and EPs ===
==== Compilation albums ====
Title	Details	Charts
Title	Details	Spain
The Best of Juanjo Bona	Released: June 20, 2024; Label: Universal Music; Format: CD, digital download	1

==== Studio albums ====
Title	Details	CD charts	Vinyl charts
Title	Details	Spain	Spain
Recardelino	Release: March 7, 2025; Label: Universal Music; Format: CD, vinyl, digital download; Jenesaispop Rating: 8/10	2	2

=== Singles ===
==== As a lead artist ====
Year	Song	Chart Position	Album
Year	Song	Spain	Album
2024	"Lo que no ves de mí"	92	"The Best of Juanjo Bona"
2024	"Mis Tías"	98	"Recardelino"
2024	"Moncayo"	—	"Recardelino"
2025	"Golondrinas"	—	"Recardelino"
2025	"Virgen de Magallón"	—	"Recardelino"

==== Collaborations ====
Year	Song	Chart Position
Year	Song	Spain
2024	"La gravedad" (with Naiara Moreno, Paul Thin, Ruslana, Lucas Curotto and Martin Urrutia)	—
2024	"El destello" (with Martin Urrutia)	94
2024	"El destello (Remix)" (with Martin Urrutia)	—

== Awards and nominations ==
Year	Country	Award	Category	Nominated work	Result	Ref.
2024	Spain	Aragonese Music Awards	Traveling Award for Dissemination	Himself (along with Naiara Moreno)	Won	
2024	Spain	MADO Award	LGBTI Diversity	Himself (with colleagues from the OT23 collective)	Won	
2024	Brazil	BreakTudo Awards	Song by a new international artist	"Lo que no ves de mí"	Nominated	
2025	Spain	Aragonese Music Awards	Greatest Projection	Himself	Won	
2025	Spain	Aragonese Music Awards	Best Song	"Moncayo"	Nominated	
