= Merche =

Spanish pop singer

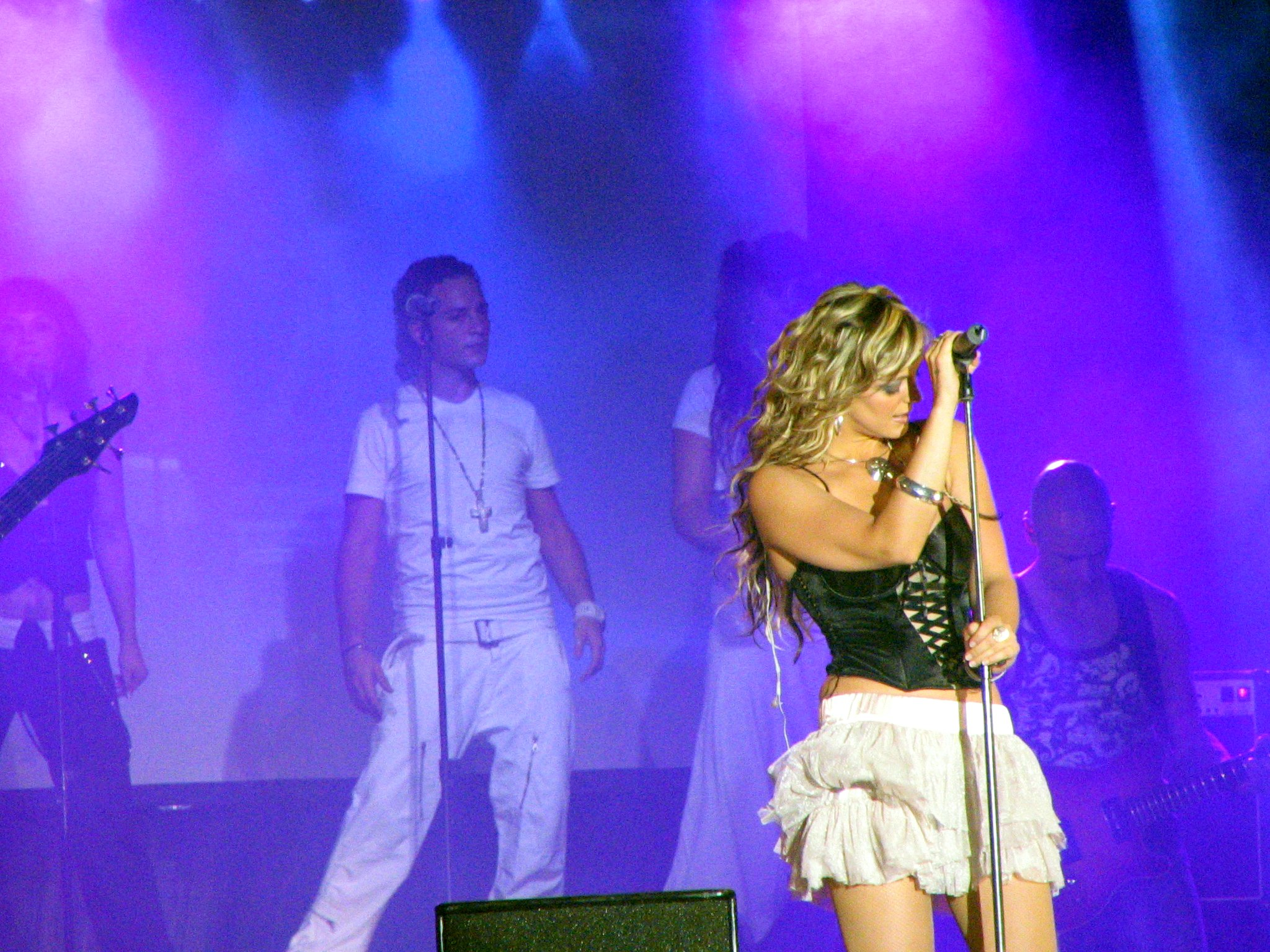
- Merche performing in 2006

Background information
- Also known as: Luna
- Born: Mercedes Trujillo Callealta; 14 June 1974 (age 52)
- Origin: Cádiz, Spain
- Genre: Pop
- Occupations: Singing, songwriter, producer
- Instrument: Vocals
- Years active: 2001–present
- Labels: Vale Music, Universal

Mercedes Trujillo Callealta (born 14 June 1974 in Cádiz, Spain), best known as Merche, is a Spanish singer-songwriter, who writes all the music and lyrics for her own songs. She has sold over a million albums.

== Early life ==
As a child, Merche acted in school plays and aspired to be a singer. She was gifted her first guitar at the age of six, and her first time on stage was at a school performance when she was seven. After graduating from university, she became a music teacher. At this time she sang in a band called Bahía Azul, and worked translating naval contracts at the Cádiz shipyards.

== Career ==
In 2001, she participated as Luna in the Spanish national final for the Eurovision Song Contest with the song "No pidas más amor". She finished in sixth place, but signed with Vale Music and started recording her first album Mi sueño. From spring 2002 to the end of summer, her single "No pidas más amor" was a national hit in Spain. Merche appeared on TV to support the album and single, which also became the title track of the Spanish version of Big Brother.

"Como pude" was released as a second single, but sales were lackluster. In fall 2002 she released her third single, "Le deseo". The album, Mi sueño, became a hit, up to No. 12 some weeks. It was certified gold, and a few months later, platinum.

In the summer of 2003, her fourth single was released, called "Mi sueño", with supporting appearances on TV.

In 2002 and 2003, Merche toured with her first album. During the Mi Sueño Tour, she sang all the songs from the album and two covers of other artists, Alaska's "A quién le importa" and Ray Heredia's "Alegría de vivir".

In 2004, she released her second album, Auténtica, which debuted at number 7 on the charts, and in 2005, she released Necesito Libertad. A song from that album, "Eras tú", was her biggest success at that point.

In 2026, she was announced as a participant of Benidorm Fest 2027.

== Personal life ==
Merche's parents separated when she was a child. Her father, Pedro, was a singer in Carnavales de Cádiz, now retired. Her mother, Caty, is a housewife. Merche has two sisters, one older, Maria, and one younger, Veronica, who is also her personal assistant. Her adopted daughter is named Ambika.

== Discography ==
- Mi sueño (2002) (Platinum)
- Auténtica (2004) (Platinum)
- Necesito libertad (2005) (Platinum)
- Cal y arena (2007) (Platinum)
- Acordes de mi diario (2010) (Gold)
- Un mundo de colores (2012)
- Quiero contarte (2014)
- "De otra manera" (2017)
- "Es Ahora" (2020)
- "20 Conmigo" (2022)
