= Benidorm Fest 2027 =

Spanish song contest

Dates and venue
- Semi-final 1: 26 January 2027
- Semi-final 2: 28 January 2027
- Final: 30 January 2027
- Venue: Palau Municipal d'Esports l'Illa de Benidorm; Benidorm, Spain

Production
- Broadcaster: Radiotelevisión Española (RTVE)
- Director: César Vallejo
- Artistic director: Sergio Jaén
- Executive supervisor: María Eizaguirre

Participants
- Number of entries: 18

Benidorm Fest 2027 is set to be the sixth edition of the annual Benidorm Fest, a television song contest held in Benidorm, Spain, organised by Radiotelevisión Española (RTVE). The competition will consist of two semi-finals on 26 and 28 January, and a final on 30 January 2027.

== Format ==
The competition will consist of two semi-finals on 26 and 28 January, and a final on 30 January 2027. In total, 18 participants will be divided across two semi-finals, with nine competing in each.

=== Creative team ===
On 24 March 2026, RTVE announced during a press conference that Sergio Jaén would be the artistic director for the second year running, with Finnish visual designer Ari Levelä as visual and lighting director, and Borja Rueda as choreographer.

== Competing entries ==
A public submission window was open between 6 April and 30 July 2026. Upon closing the submission period, RTVE announced that almost 900 applications had been received, including 350 that arrived on the last day of submissions. The 18 participants, selected by a professional panel, were announced on 14 October at Prado del Rey. Snippets of the competing entries will be revealed on 10 December, while the full songs will be released on 17 December.

Benidorm Fest 2027 participants
- Alba Morena
- Andrés Koi
- Bombai
- Chema Rivas
- Dani Dicostas
- Fran Tuduri
- Gale
- Isabel Aaiún
- Ladilla Rusa
- Merche
- Pipiolas
- Polo Nández and Sebastián Llosa
- Rossa
- Sara Abad
- Sev's
- Suzete
- Tami Tamako
- Vicco
