= Ladilla Rusa =

Ladila Rusa
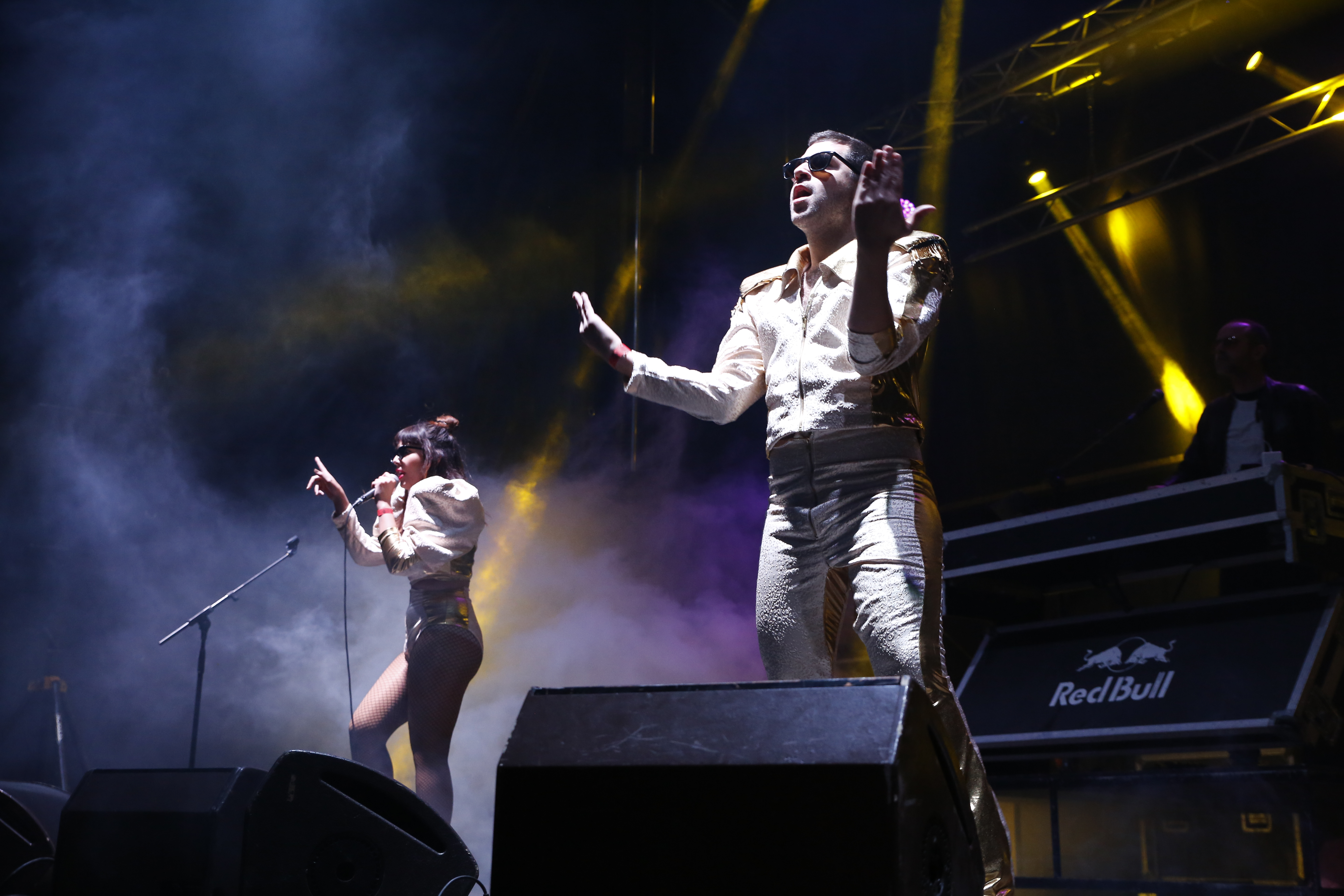
- Performance of the duo Ladilla Rusa at the festival Palencia Sonora 2019.

Background information
- Origin: Montcada i Reixac, Spain
- Genre: pop

Ladilla Rusa is a Spanish musical group formed in 2017 and originally from Montcada i Reixac, which is a municipality of the Province of Barcelona.

== History ==
Tania Lozano and Víctor F. Clares, originally from Montcada i Reixac, friends since childhood and journalists by training, decided in 2017 to create a musical duo, initially as a joke. Their style has influences of electropop, Catalan rumba and other influences from the Barcelona periphery, in what has been dubbed as "charnego pride. They have played at the Sonorama and Arenal Sound festivals.

In 2026, the duo were announced as participants of Benidorm Fest 2027.

== Discography ==
- Estado del Malestar. La Mundial Records (2018).
