= Twin Murders: The Silence of the White City =

2019 film by Fernando González Molina

- Film poster
- Spanish: El silencio de la ciudad blanca
- Directed by: Daniel Calparsoro
- Written by: Alfred Pérez Fargas; Roger Danès
- Based on: the novel by Eva García Sáenz de Urturi
- Produced by: Joaquín Padró; Mar Targarona; Mikel Lejarza; Mercedes Gamero
- Starring: Belén Rueda; Javier Rey; Aura Garrido; Manolo Solo; Àlex Brendemühl
- Cinematography: Josu Inchaustegui
- Edited by: Antonio Frutos
- Music by: Fernando Velázquez
- Production companies: Atresmedia Cine; Rodar y Rodar; Silencio Ciudad Blanca AIE; Hugo P27
- Distributed by: DeAPlaneta
- Release date: 25 October 2019
- Running time: 110 minutes
- Country: Spain
- Language: Spanish

Twin Murders: The Silence of the White City (Spanish: El silencio de la ciudad blanca) is a 2019 Spanish action adventure psychological mystery crime-thriller film directed by Daniel Calparsoro from a screenplay by Alfred Pérez Fargas and Roger Danés based on a novel by Eva García Sáenz de Urturi. It stars Belén Rueda, Javier Rey, and Aura Garrido.

== Synopsis ==
A detective returns to Vitoria-Gasteiz to solve murders mimicking those allegedly committed by a mass serial killer who is set to be released from prison after serving his 20-year jail term.

== Cast ==
- Belén Rueda as Alba Díaz de Salvatierra
- Javier Rey as Unai López de Ayala
- Itziar Ituño as Dra. Guevara
- Aura Garrido as Estíbaliz Ruiz de Gauna
- Manolo Solo as Mario Santos
- Àlex Brendemühl as Tasio
- Pedro Casablanc as Òptico
- Àlex Monner as Falso Eneko
- Richard Sahagún as Jota
- Rubén Ochandiano
- Ramón Barea as Abuelo
- Kandido Uranga as Padre Tasio/Ignacio

== Production ==
The film is an Atresmedia Cine, Rodar y Rodar, Silencio Ciudad Blanca AIE and Hugo P27 production and it had the participation of Atresmedia, Movistar+, EiTB, and Netflix. The film was shot and set in the city of Vitoria-Gasteiz. The film also features an old cathedral of Santa María which was founded in 1180. The film story also resembles that of the 1991 American film The Silence of the Lambs by Jonathan Demme as well as the 2006 American film The Da Vinci Code, directed by Ron Howard.

== Release ==
Distributed by DeAPlaneta, the film was released theatrically in Spain on 25 October 2019. It was made available on Netflix on 6 March 2020 and opened to mixed reviews from the critics.

== See also ==
- List of Spanish films of 2019
