= Alba Morena =

Catalan singer-songwriter (born 2000)

- Born: Alba Morena; 2000 (age 25–26); Salou, Tarragonés, Spain
- Genres: Pop, Folk, Electronic Pop, Flamenco, Jazz
- Occupations: Singer; Songwriter
- Instruments: Vocals; violin
- Years active: 2021–present
- Label: Universal Music Spain

Alba Morena (born Salou, 2000) is a Spanish singer-songwriter.

== Background ==
Morena received musical training at the Vila-seca Conservatory and Taller de Músics University. She studied violin from age six to eighteen. She also studied opera and jazz.

== Career ==
Prior to her solo musical career, Morena began songwriting. She co-wrote "Recordar" for Ana Torroja and "Tú y yo" for Luz Casal.

In 2021, she released her debut album Las dos edades. The album was self-published and Morena created it on musical composition app GarageBand. Las dos edades featured covers of childhood songs. In 2023, she released a single titled "Nadie" with David Soler and Marcel Bagés.

In 2024, she signed with Universal Music Spain. Following her signing, she released her EP Yo Te Quiero Pero. The EP featured a track dedicated to her brother, inspired by the track "Me cuesta tanto olvidarte" by Mecano. In the same year, a track from Yo Te Quiero Pero featured on RTVE show "Un país para escucharlo".

She released her EP titled Trámite in 2025. It incorporated punk, alternative and rock influenced. She put the production of her unreleased album El Extintor on hold to record Trámite.

Morena released her debut studio album Morena con A in September 2026. Prior to the album release, she released the singles "2º-1a" and "Estaba claro que no". In the same year, she founded Club Debut, a monthly open mic for female performers, with musician Alba Reche. In October 2026, she was announced as a participant for Benidorm Fest 2027. She’d previously collaborated with Benidorm Fest 2025 participant DeTeresa for their song “Pirulí.”

== Artistry ==
Morena's musical influences include Charli XCX, The Beatles and Rocío Jurado. She writes about themes of love, personal balance and youth. She takes inspiration from flamenco, folk and jazz music. She has performed genres of electronic pop, opera and classical, electronic and folk.

== Discography ==
=== Albums ===
- Las dos edades (2021)
- Morena con A (2026)

=== EPs ===
- Yo Te Quiero Pero (2024)
- Trámite (2025)

=== Singles ===
- "Nadie" (2023)
- "2º-1a" (2026)
- "Estaba claro que no" (2026)
