= Fiestas del Pilar =

Annual festival celebrated in the city of Zaragoza, Aragon, Spain

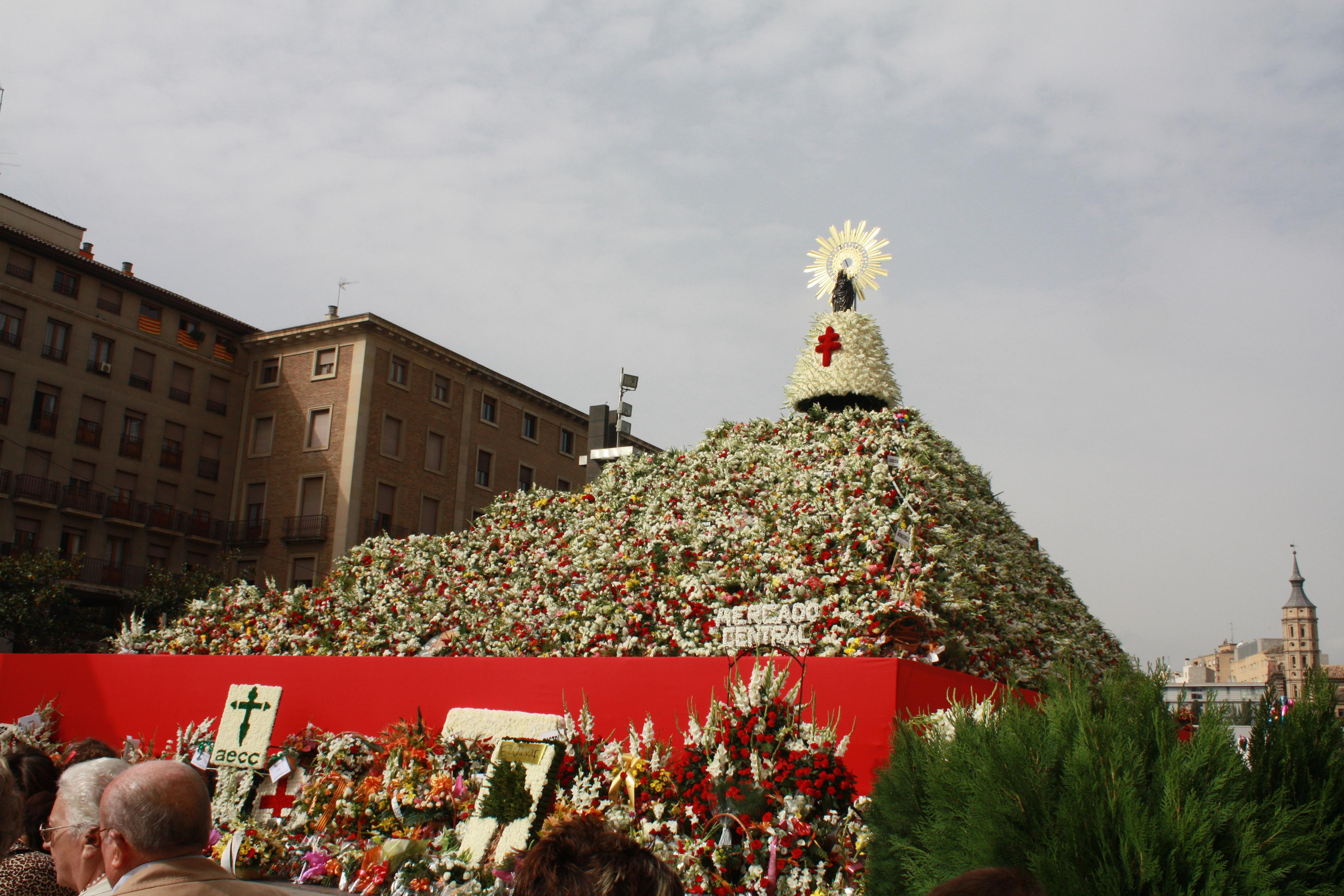
- Flower offering
- Genre: Festival
- Date: 12 October
- Frequency: Annual
- Locations: Zaragoza, Spain
- Patron: Our Lady of the Pillar

Fiesta of International Tourist Interest
- Designated: 2019

The Fiestas del Pilar are an annual festival celebrated in the city of Zaragoza, Aragon, in honour of the patron saint of the city, the Virgen del Pilar (Our Lady of the Pillar). The week long festival takes place every year, usually, beginning the weekend of or before 12 October, and lasts until the following Sunday.

A wide variety of events are organized by the City Hall, with private companies and organizations organizing their own sponsored events, shows, contests, and other activities.

While veneration of the Blessed Virgin in Zaragoza can be traced to at least the 12th century, the introduction of 12 October as the local feast day in remembrance of the Marian apparition was introduced by the city council in 1640, and approved by the Holy See in 1723. The national holiday of Spain, first introduced in 1918 and confirmed for the contemporary Spanish state in 1982, also falls on 12 October, chosen for the date of the discovery of the Americas (in the USA known as Columbus Day).

== Religious celebrations ==
=== Solemn Mass of Infants ===
The first Mass of the day, on October 12, is the Solemne Misa de Infantes, or Solemn Mass of Infants, celebrated in the Saint Chapel of the Basilica del Pilar, at 4.30 a.m. Despite the early hour, the Mass is extremely popular, and exceptionally well attended.

=== The Offering of Flowers ===
This is the high point of the festival, and a demonstration of the people's devotion to the Virgin Mary. Throughout the day of 12 October, thousands of people dressed in traditional costume, leave flowers at the statue of the Virgin, which has a place of honour in the middle of the Plaza del Pilar. There, an army of volunteers arrange flowers in a pyramidal form, creating a flower mantle around the base of the statue, which remains in the square for the duration of the festival for public viewing. People can participate in the flower offering individually, or as a group. Typically, groups are organized by schools, companies, villages and other entities, and they organize their own parades around the local streets and neighborhoods ending up at the main square for the offering itself. Today, even international contingents inclusive of Spanish speaking nations have joined the parade.

The popularity of the Offering of Flowers in Zaragoza is evidenced by the large number of groups that take part each year (378 groups in 2005) and the duration of the long walk to the Plaza, which can usually last for over eight hours. In 2009, a record number of 450,000 people took part in the flower parade.

The Flower Offering tradition started in 1952, when a group of City Hall functionaries went on a field trip to visit a festival outside of Zaragoza - the Magdalena Festival in Castellón de la Plana. Based on what they had witnessed there, they decided to embark on creating a similar festival for Zaragoza, which they launched in 1958.

Around the Virgin's mantle, the Cross of Lorraine is usually depicted with red flowers against a background of white flowers, a two-tiered cross, insignia of the original crusader Templar Hospitallers Order of Jerusalem. This cross of flowers is an offering made by the local General Royo Villanova Hospital, a tradition they started in 1960, on behalf of incurable patients with tuberculosis who were unable to attend. The hospital's Cross of Flowers is placed at the mantle, in a formal ceremony, by the Queen of the Festival and her Court of Honour.

=== Pontifical Mass ===
After the Offering of Flowers, a Mass is celebrated in the Basilica del Pilar at midnight, followed by a parade.

=== The Offering of Fruits ===
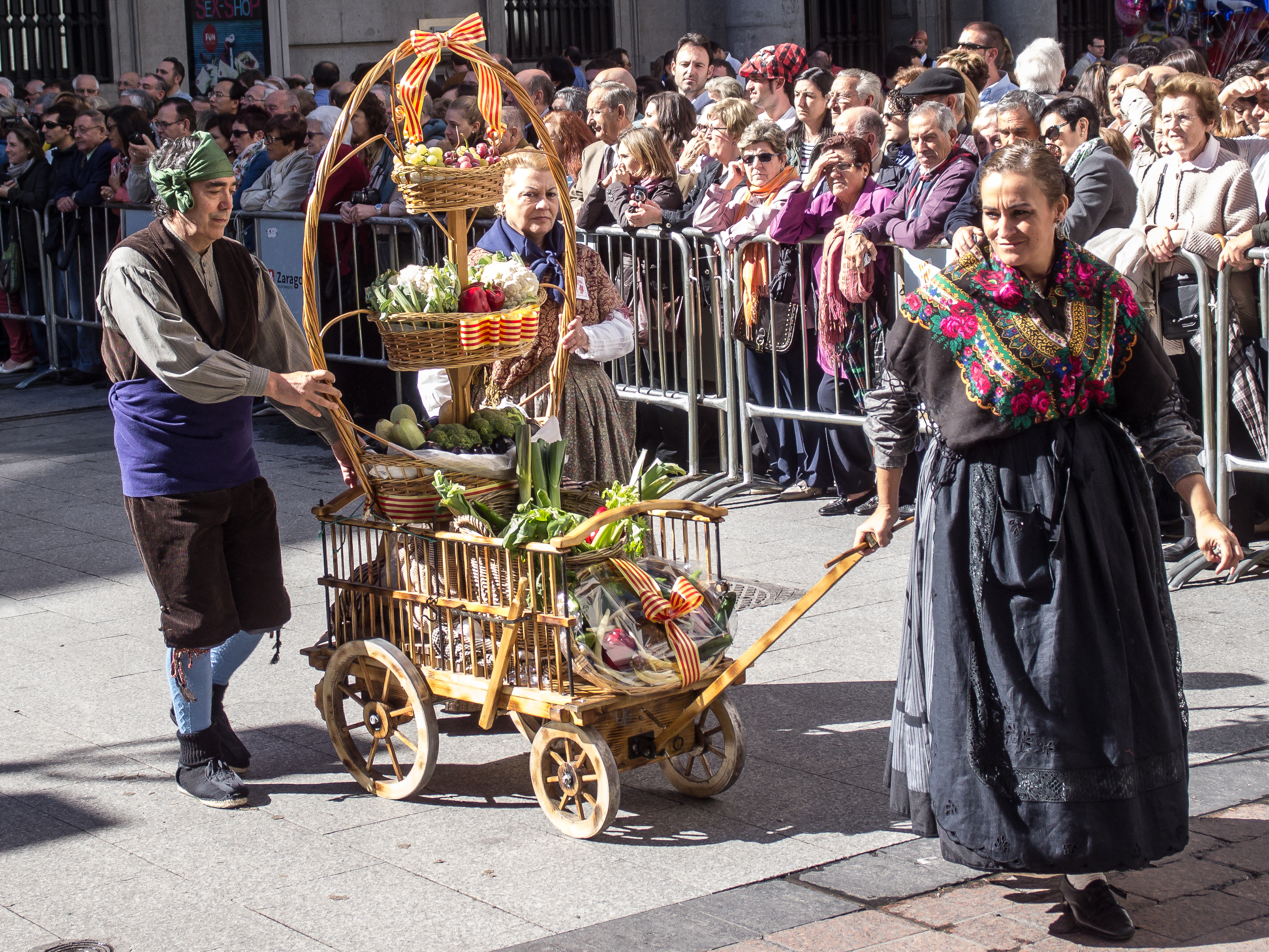
Offering of Fruits.

On the morning of 13 October, the Offering of Fruits takes place. This tradition, akin to a harvest festival, first took place in 1949, and was a precursor to the offering of Flowers. A parade takes place with a similar route to that of the Offering of Flowers, in which people bring to the Virgin a variety of fruits, primarily produce from the region of Aragon, as well as other regions in the country.

=== The Glass Rosary parade ===
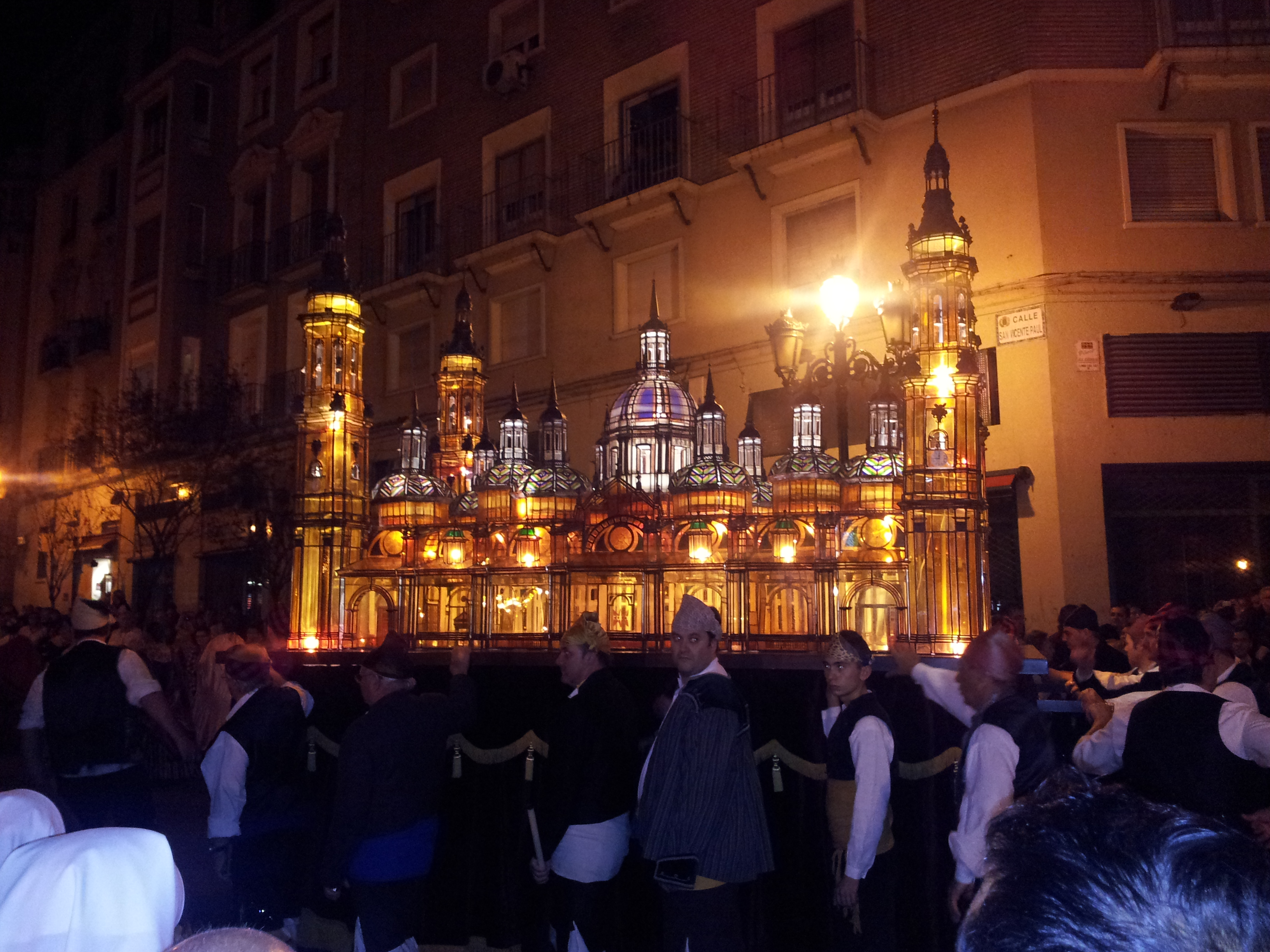
Recreation of the Basilica del Pilar

The Glass Rosary parade, or Rosario de Cristal, is one of the most unusual parades in the world. Originating in 1889, it combines both religiosity and art and consists of 29 parade floats made entirely of glass, known as "faroles" (lamps), all illuminated from within, making for a spectacular evening parade and light show. Fifteen of the floats represent the mysteries of the rosary, while other floats depict different topics, such as recreations of famous sanctuaries like the Basilica del Pilar, or the Sagrada Familia, as well as other religious and cultural themes.

Right up until 1926 the glass floats, lit up by candles, were carried on people's shoulders, and it wasn't until 1940 that electricity was used to illuminate them.

The Glass Rosary parade always starts at sunset each October 13 proceeding from the Iglesia del Sagrado Corazón de Jesús (Church of the Sacred Heart of Jesus), and follows a route around the main streets ending at the city centre.

== Other celebrations ==
=== The Town Crier (Opening speech) ===
The Town Crier (or Pregón) announces the opening speech of the festival. The proclamation is on the Saturday before 12 October from the balcony of the City Hall. Rather than using a designated town crier, every year well-known or well-respected personalities of Aragon are selected and awarded the honour of proclaiming the opening of the festival.

- 2024 - Juanjo Bona and Naiara Moreno
- 2017 - Kase.O
- 2016 - Luisa Gavasa
- 2015 - Carmen París
- 2014 - Braulio Cantera
- 2013 - Oregón Televisión
- 2012 - Teresa Perales
- 2011 - Plácido Díez
- 2010 - Álvaro Arbeloa
- 2009 - José Antonio Labordeta
- 2008 - Guillermo Herrera
- 2007 - Lita Claver "la Maña"
- 2006 - Amaral
- 2005 - César Lainez
- 2004 - Javier Coronas
- 2003 - Carlos Pauner
- 2002 - Enrique Bunbury
- 2001 - Bigas Luna
- 2000 - Javier González Ferrari
- 1999 - Andoni Cedrún
- 1998 - Paco Ortiz
- 1997 - Raúl Gracia "el Tato"
- 1996 - Imperio Argentina
- 1995 - Arantxa Argüelles
- 1994 - Víctor Fernández
- 1993 - Fernando Escartín
- 1992 - Epi
- 1991 - Pilar Lorengar
- 1990 - Soledad Puertolas
- 1989 - Javier Tomeo
- 1988 - Eduardo Foncillas
- 1987 - Luis del Val
- 1986 - José Luis Borau
- 1985 - Javier Moracho
- 1984 - Antonio Saura
- 1983 - Conchita Buñuel
- 1982 - Antonio Mingote
- 1981 - Francisco Yndurain
- 1980 - Ildefonso Manuel Gil

=== Comparsa de gigantes y cabezudos ===
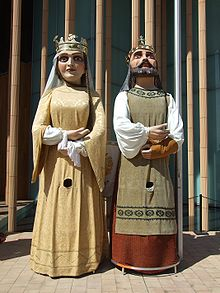
The King and Queen

The Giants and Big Heads are, without doubt, one of the most beloved traditions for the people of Zaragoza. Giant costumed figures made of papier-mâché are made to look disproportionately big-headed in the case of "cabezudos" or huge giants in the case of "gigantes". During the festival, the giants process daily around the streets, covering all areas of the city. There are ten "cabezudos", with different names, and all of them wearing different costumes. The cabezudos depict well known local characters (such as "el Morico", "el Boticario", "el Robaculeros", "el Torero", "el Tuerto", "el Forano", "la Forana", "el Verrugón", "la Pilara" and el "Azutero") and each of them has its own song. The cabezudos are teased by the children and teens, and they answer to this provocation by chasing them along the streets and hitting them gently with whipcords. The gigantes, or Giants, are a more formal part of the show, with a cast of regal and noble medieval and historic characters that entertain the people with their elegant dances in pairs. The current giants were designed in 1849 by the sculptor Felix Oroz.

=== General Fair of Zaragoza ===
The General fair takes place in the Exhibition Hall of Zaragoza. A series of pavilions dedicated to different types of products, such as food, furniture, cars and science are on display for public viewing, and various shows and events are organized to entertain visitors.

=== Activities for children ===
Outdoor puppet shows and short theatre plays are put on in various parks around the city, such as the Parque Delicias and Parque Jose Antonio Labordeta.

=== Funfair and circus ===
The funfair, which includes a wide variety of roller coasters is held in the Fair Enclosure of Valdespartera. The circus also comes to town during the festival.

=== Concerts ===
During the festival many stages and venues are set up all over the city, for concerts spanning all musical genres, with performances by local and world-famous singers and groups. Concerts sponsored by the city are usually free, while those sponsored by private organizations, such as Interpeñas, are fee-based.

=== Beer Fest ===
The Beer Fest, known as "Oktoberfest", takes place in the Theme Park of Zaragoza, under a big awning. German products and large amounts of imported beer are on offer. Waitresses are dressed in German costumes with a traditional German orchestra playing in the background. The Beer Fair is visited by about three thousand people a day.

=== Fin de fiesta ===
The festival ends with grand finale of an outdoor concert in Paseo de la Independencia and a firework show at the banks of the river Ebro.
