= Omar Ayuso =

Spanish actor (born 1998)

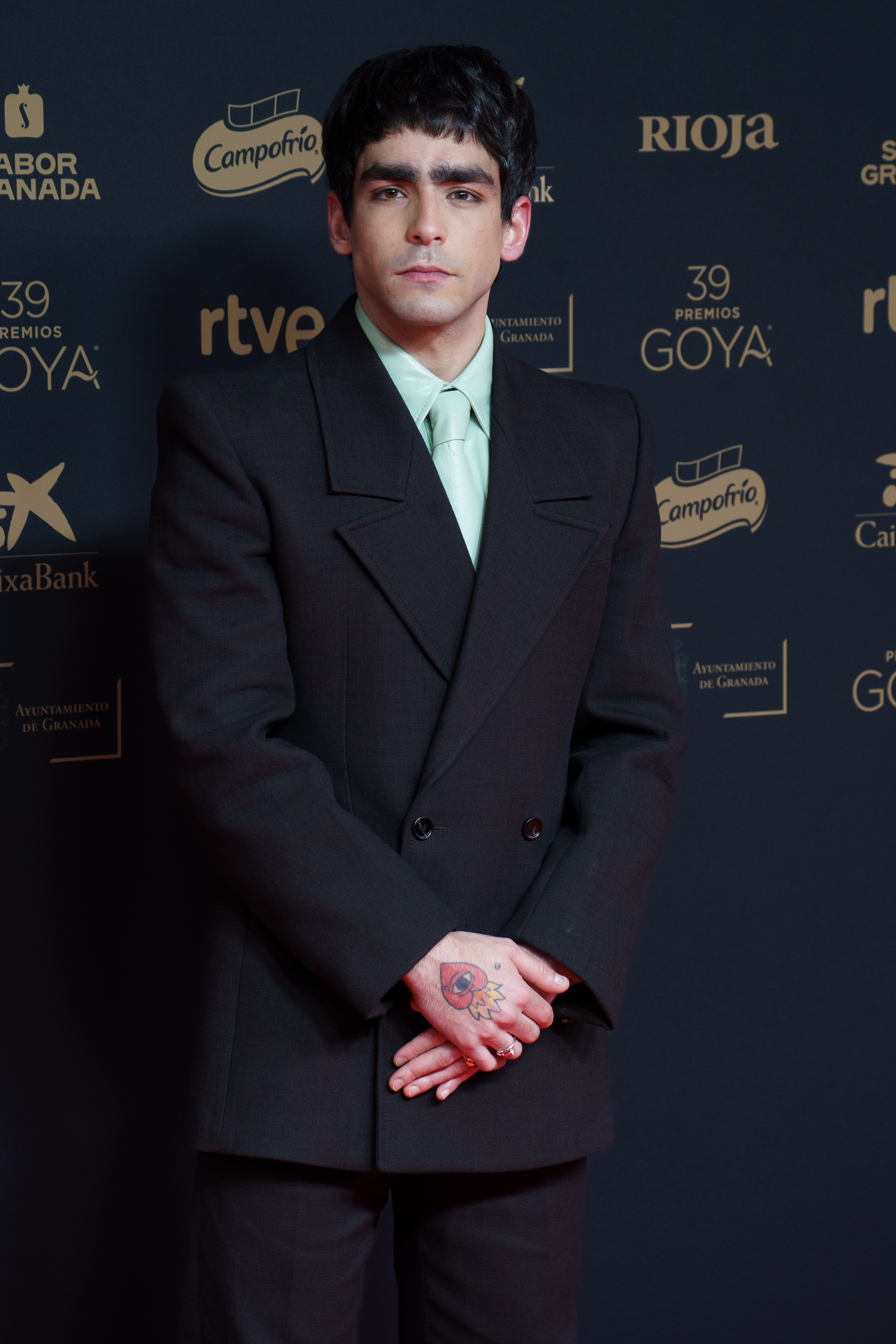
- Ayuso in 2025
- Born: 26 March 1998 (age 28); Madrid, Spain
- Education: Charles III University of Madrid
- Occupation: Actor
- Years active: 2018–present

Omar Ayuso (born 26 March 1998) is a Spanish actor. He is known for his role as Omar Shanaa in the television series Elite (2018–2024).

== Early life and education ==
Ayuso was born in Madrid on 26 March 1998 and raised in Manzanares el Real. His father is from Morocco. After watching Bad Education (2004) as a child, he became interested in becoming an actor or filmmaker. Ayuso studies audiovisual communication at the Charles III University of Madrid.

== Career ==
In 2018, Ayuso was cast in the Spanish Netflix television series Elite as Omar Shanaa, a closeted gay Muslim who develops a relationship with Ander Muñoz who is played by Arón Piper. In preparation for the role, Ayuso worked for two months with director Ramón Salazar to absorb his character's role.

In 2019, Ayuso starred in three short films including Maras' de Salvador Calvo and Ráfagas de vida salvaje by Jorge Cantos and Disseminare by Jools Beardon.

In January 2020, Ayuso was featured in the music video of "Juro Que" by Spanish singer-songwriter Rosalía.

=== Public image ===
Ayuso and Piper's onscreen relationship, coined "Omander", and offscreen friendship has generated a global following. As of June 2020, he had over four million followers on social media. The role has boosted LGBT visibility although Ayuso resists the notion that he serves as a role model. As a gay man, Ayuso has been the subject of homophobic commentary. He believes the widespread support for his onscreen relationship with Piper is due to it being easier for homophobic people to accept gay people in fiction rather than in real life.

Ayuso has had a transgressive image which includes provocative fashion choices in public appearances and social media posts.

== Personal life ==
Ayuso has a tattoo of a flame and an eye on his hand inspired by Spanish artist Ricardo Cavolo. He is gay and has stated that he is proud of his generation's social progress on topics including feminism, LGBT rights and efforts against racism.

Ayuso cites Spanish-Mexican singer Alaska as one of his idols.

As of March 2020, Ayuso is in a relationship with artist Alonso Díaz.

== Filmography ==
=== Short films ===
| Year | Title | Director | Notes |
|---|---|---|---|
| 2019 | Maras | Salvador Calvo | |
| 2019 | Ráfagas de vida salvaje | Jorge Cantos | |
| 2019 | Disseminare | Jools Beardon | |

=== Television ===
| Year | Title | Role | Notes |
|---|---|---|---|
| 2018 | El Continental | —N/a | Episode: "Réquiem... mami" |
| 2018–2024 | Élite | Omar Shanaa | Main cast (seasons 1–5, 7–8); 55 episodes |
| 2021 | Élite historias breves: Nadia Guzman | Omar Shanaa | Main cast; 2 episodes |
| 2021 | Élite historias breves: Omar Ander Alexis | Omar Shanaa | Main cast; 2 episodes |
| 2021 | Élite historias breves: Samuel Omar | Omar Shanaa | Main cast; 3 episodes |
| 2025 | Mariliendre | Luis | Main cast; 5 episodes |

=== Music videos ===
| Year | Title | Role | Notes |
|---|---|---|---|
| 2020 | "Juro Que" (Rosalía) | | |
| 2021 | "Famoso en tres calles" (Carolina Durante) | | |
