= Eva García Sáenz de Urturi =

Spanish novelist

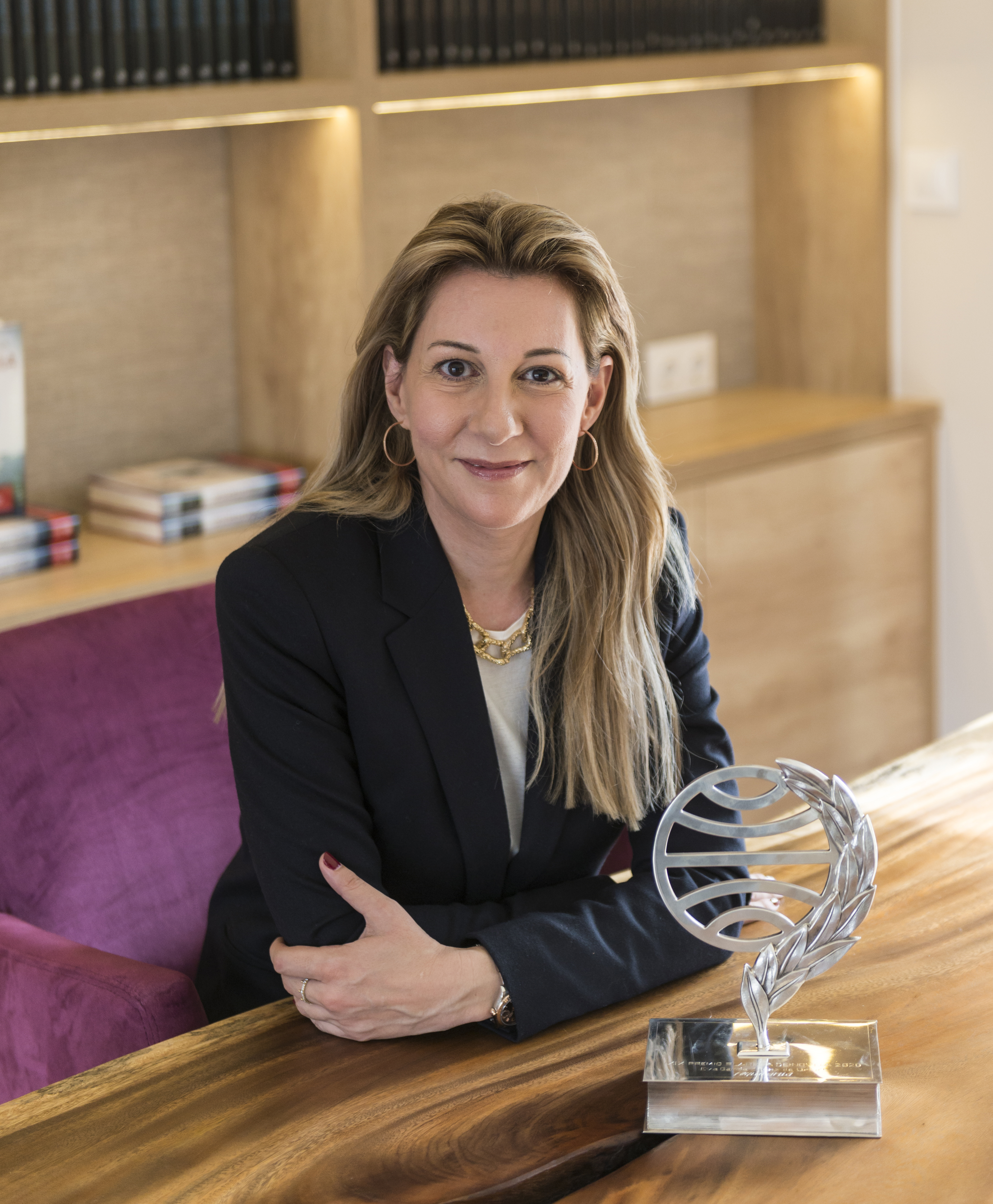
- Eva García Sáenz de Urturi with the Premio Planeta de Novela, 2020
- Born: 1972 (age 53–54); Vitoria-Gasteiz (Spain)
- Education: Optics and Optometry
- Occupation: Author/Novelist
- Notable work: El silencio de la ciudad blanca (2016); Aquitania (2020)
- Awards: 2020 Premio Planeta de Novela for Aquitania
- Website: evagarciasaenz.com

Eva García Sáenz de Urturi (Vitoria-Gasteiz, Álava, 20 August 1972) is a Spanish novelist.

== Career ==
Born in Vitoria-Gasteiz in 1972, Eva García Sáenz de Urturi has lived in Alicante since she was fifteen years old. Her career in writing began at fourteen years old San Viator Ikastetxea School in Vitoria-Gasteiz, when her literature teacher recommended that she write her experiences in a diary.

Earning degrees in Optics and Optometry, she worked as an optician and as an optometrist at a multinational organization and later at the University of Alicante. She was always drawn to literature, and has won various storytelling awards with her first works.

Eva García spent three years researching and writing her first novel, which she published in 2012: La vieja familia (The Immortal Collection). This is the first of her two-part series La saga de los longevos (A Saga of the Ancient Family). In 2014 she published the second part of the saga: Los hijos de Adán (The Sons of Adam), and a separate historical novel Pasaje a Tahití (Passage to Tahiti), both of which were well received.

In 2016 she published El silencio de la ciudad blanca (The Silence of the White City), a crime novel set in her hometown of Vitoria-Gasteiz. It became an international bestseller, spawning fans known as "krakenianos". In response to the success of the thriller, thousands of readers from around the world came to follow literary tour routes that feature the real-life settings from the book. The City of Vitoria-Gasteiz and the Basque Government themselves created some of these routes, and expected unprecedented success in cultural tourism. This novel begins the Trilogía de la ciudad blanca (the White City Trilogy).

To set the scene for this project, she contacted a police academy, where she took two courses on ocular technical inspection and fingerprint development. She recalls (translated): "The worst part was the ocular technical inspection, where you have to see many photos of crimes, and those two months were very intense and technical, but they helped me make the novel more plausible and write something that wouldn't turn the spectator's stomach, I wanted a story that wouldn't spatter blood, more elegant."

The second entry of the White City Trilogy was released in 2017, titled Los ritos del agua (The Water Rituals). The third entry, and the last in the trilogy, was released the following year in 2018, titled Los señores del tiempo (The Lords of Time). The series has sold more than one million copies, making her one of the most successful authors in Spain.

In 2019, the film El silencio de la ciudad blanca (Twin Murders: The Silence of the White City) was produced as an adaptation of the novel; Belén Rueda, Javier Rey, and Aura Garrido headed the cast, with Daniel Calparsoro as the director.

In 2020, Eva García published her second historical novel, Aquitania (Aquitaine), with which she was awarded the Premio Planeta de Novela. In this novel she fuses the historical novel with the criminal intrigue surrounding the Queen Consort Eleanor of Aquitaine.

In February 2022, Eva García presented her most recent novel El libro negro de las horas (The Black Book of Hours), an homage to book-lovers that follows her well-known character Unai López de Ayala from the Trilogía de la ciudad blanca.

Eva García also collaborates with the Spanish magazines/platforms Zenda and XLSemanal, writing articles in a section called "The bookhunter". She also collaborates with media like El Cultural, Qué Leer, El País, El Mundo, ABC, Woman Essentia, Telva and various radio stations in Latin America. She also has active social media platforms where readers can discuss her works.

== Bibliography ==
=== La saga de los longevos / A Saga of the Ancient Family ===
1. (2012) La vieja familia; English translation: The Immortal Collection (2014)
2. (2014) Los hijos de Adán; English translation: The Sons of Adam (2014)

=== Trilogía de la ciudad blanca / White City Trilogy ===
1. (2016) El silencio de la ciudad blanca; English translation: The Silence of the White City (2020)
2. (2017) Los ritos del agua; English translation: The Water Rituals (2021)
3. (2018) Los señores del tiempo; English translation: The Lords of Time (2021)

==== Related novel ====
- (2022) El libro negro de las horas

=== Standalone novels ===
- (2014) Pasaje a Tahití
- (2020) Aquitania
