= Naiara Moreno =

Spanish singer (born 1997)

Naiara
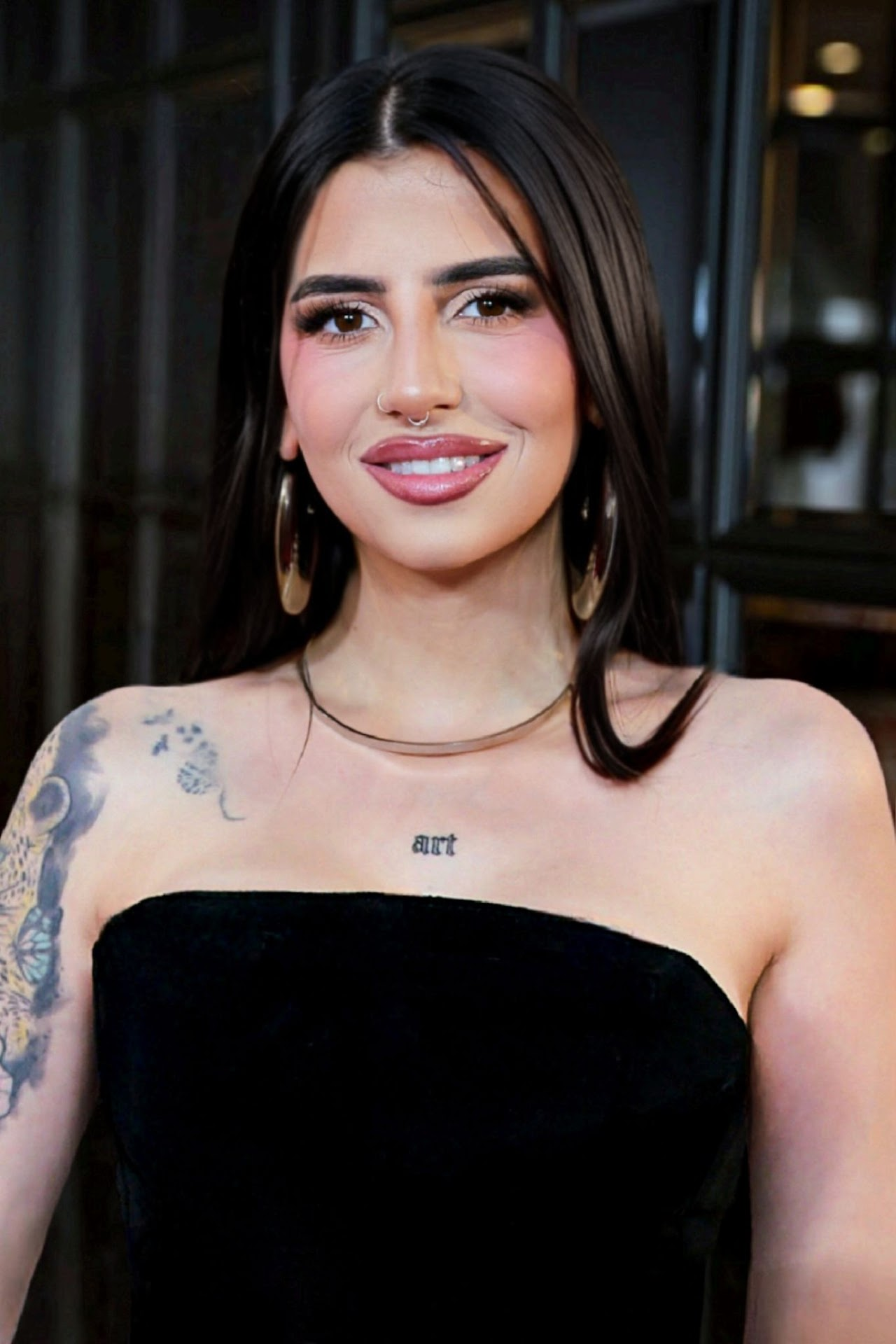
- Moreno in 2023

Background information
- Born: Naiara Moreno Aznar; 29 April 1997 (age 29); Zaragoza, Aragon, Spain
- Occupation: Singer
- Years active: 2023-present
- Label: Universal Music Spain

Naiara Moreno Aznar (born 29 April 1997), is a Spanish singer. She rose to prominence after winning the twelfth edition of the Operación Triunfo TV contest.

== Early life ==
Naiara was born in Zaragoza on 29 April 1997 and grew up in the nearby municipality of Pastriz, where her family is from; she is the eldest of six siblings. Naiara had been a singer for the Aragonese orchestra Nueva Alaska until she auditioned for Operación Triunfo in 2023.

== Musical career ==
Naiara participated in Cántame una canción, a contest that aired in 2010. Her professional career in music began as a singer with the Nueva Alaska orchestra, performing in different municipalities and cities across Spain, especially in Aragon. She independently released an EP under the stage name Laéne on February 17 2023.

On 2023, Naiara was selected as a contestant for the twelfth series of Operación Triunfo. During her time on the program, she was the favorite nominee of the audience on three occasions, and achieved special success in her hometown of Zaragoza by singing jotas during her time and giving visibility to Aragón. She reached the final thanks to the score given by the jury, and on 19 February she was proclaimed the winner with the song "Sobreviviré" by Mónica Naranjo, with 49% of the votes.

Naiara released her debut major label single "ENLOKIÁ" under Amazon Music on 11 April 2024. She was included alongside several of her Operación Triunfo mates in the official song for the 2024 Spanish Olympic team, titled "La Gravedad", which was released on May 8th. On 5 October 2024, Naiara and fellow Zaragozan OT finalist Juanjo Bona gave the opening speech of the Fiestas del Pilar in Zaragoza.

On August 2025, Naiara's debut studio album, scheduled to be released later that year, was postponed, and its supporting tour I LOVE SPAIN TOUR was cancelled. The album was later reworked as the EP "LA ESPAÑOLA", released on May 22 2026.

== Discography ==
==== EPs ====
- Laéne (2023)
- LA ESPAÑOLA (2026)

==== Compilation albums ====
- Lo mejor de Naiara (OT 2023) (2024)

== Tours ==
==== Co-headlining ====
- OT 2023 En Concierto (2024)

== Filmography ==
Television
Year	Title	Role	Notes
2010	Cántame una canción	Herself	Contestant
2023-2024	Operación Triunfo series 12	Herself	Contestant, winner
2024	La resistencia	Herself	Guest
2024	Martínez y Hermanos	Herself	Guest
2024	OT23: The tour	Herself	Documentary and movie
