= Chiara Oliver =

Spanish singer

- Oliver in 2025
- Born: Chiara Oliver Williams; 11 March 2004 (age 22); Ciutadella de Menorca, Balearic Islands, Spain
- Occupation: Singer
- Years active: 2021–present
- Musical career
- Genres: Pop; pop rock; dream pop
- Instruments: Vocals; guitar; piano; bass guitar
- Label: Universal Music Spain
- Website: https://chiaraoliveroficial.com

Chiara Oliver Williams (born March 11, 2004), known professionally as Chiara Oliver, is a Spanish singer and songwriter who gained recognition for participating in twelfth edition of the Operación Triunfo contest.

== Early life ==
Oliver, who is of Menorcan descent on her father's side and English on her mother's side, showed an interest in music from her early years. She began her musical training at the Municipal School of Music of Ciutadella and later at the Menorca Conservatory. Her first contact with a stage was at the age of 6, when she participated as a candidate in a talent contest organized by a hotel.

Oliver has participated in various talent contests. She reached the final of Got Talent España in 2019, participated in La Voz in 2022 as part of Laura Pausini's team, and in 2023 she took part in the twelfth edition of the Operación Triunfo. In addition, she has performed concerts in several towns in Menorca, including Mahón, Sant Lluís, Ciutadella de Menorca, Es Mercadal and Ferreries. In the summer of 2023, she performed in the performance of the Menorcan musical Los Piratas, as part of the Piedra Viva festival.

On International Women's Day 2021, Oliver was one of the twenty Balearic women responsible for setting music to music and adapting the poem Ocho de marzo by Gioconda Belli to Catalan, under the title "Vuit de març és cada dia". This project included a video clip produced by the STEI Intersindical, in which she collaborated with prominent artists such as Miquela Lladó, Clara Fiol, Pilar Reiona and Marta Elka.

In June 2024, her second single entitled 3 de febrero was released under the Universal Music Spain record label.

Later that year, Oliver expanded her discography with the release of two extended plays: La libreta rosa, a project characterized by personal and introspective songwriting, and La última página, which explores a wider sonic palette including pop-rock and ballad influences. These releases helped solidify her reputation as a rising voice in the Spanish pop scene. In parallel, she collaborated with the Catalan urban pop duo The Tyets on the track "Fa Dies", blending her vocals into the group's distinctive Mediterranean sound.

In 2025, she also joined acclaimed Spanish singer-songwriter Pablo López on the duet "Tulipanes", further establishing herself as an artist capable of adapting to both mainstream and alternative styles.

In December 2025, Chiara Oliver announced her new single titled "Puzzle", which was released on 12 December 2025. This release marked a transition toward new music, suggesting an artistic evolution from her previous works and the anticipation of a larger recording project in the future. On 26 December 2025, Oliver announced a European tour for 2026, with scheduled dates in Paris, London, and Dublin during the month of April.

== Musical style ==
When it comes to her musical skills, Oliver shows versatility by mastering composition and playing various instruments, including guitar, piano and bass. In addition, she finds inspiration in artists such as American singer Olivia Rodrigo.

== Personal life ==
Oliver resides in Barcelona and is studying modern singing at the Catalonia College of Music.

Oliver is openly lesbian, an aspect of her identity that she spoke about naturally during her participation in Operación Triunfo 2023. In a recent interview, she expressed her appreciation for the diversity that characterizes the contest and is glad that younger generations see it as something natural. She also lives with ADHD, during her time on Operación Triunfo, both she and Lucas Curotto shared their experiences on how this disorder affects their daily lives. Since leaving the show, she has received numerous thanks for providing visibility to this condition and contributing to raising awareness in society about it.

== Discography ==
=== Albums and EPs ===
==== EPs ====
| Títle | Details | CD Chart | Vinyl Chart |
| Títle | Details | (Spain) ESP | (Spain) ESP |
|---|---|---|---|
| La libreta rosa | Released: July 12, 2024; Label: Universal Music; Format: CD, vinyl, digital download | 1 | 1 |
| La última página | Released: January 31, 2025; Label: Universal Music; Format: CD, vinyl, digital download | 2 | 1 |

=== Singles ===
As a lead artist

| Year | Song | Chart Position | Album/EP |
| Year | Song | (Spain) ESP | Album/EP |
|---|---|---|---|
| 2024 | "Mala costumbre" | — | — |
| 2024 | "3 de febrero" | — | La libreta rosa |
| 2024 | "La invitada" | — | La libreta rosa |
| 2024 | "Bucle" | — | La última página |
| 2025 | "Otro día" | — | La última página |

Collaborations

| Year | Song | Chart Position | Album/EP |
| Year | Song | (Spain) ESP | Album/EP |
|---|---|---|---|
| 2024 | "El parque" (with VIOLETA) | — | La libreta rosa |
| 2024 | "Fa Dies" (with The Tyets) | — | Cafè pels més cafeteros |
| 2025 | "Tulipanes" (with Pablo López) | — | — |

=== Soundtracks ===
- Robot salvaje (2024): "Tocar el cielo" ("Kiss The Sky" by Maren Morris)

== Tours ==
=== Headlining ===
- La Libreta Rosa Tour (2024-2025)
- No Fue Real Tour (2026)

=== Co-headlining ===
- OT2023 En Concierto (2024)

=== Opening act ===
- Aitana – Cuarto Azul World Tour (2026)

== Filmography ==
=== Cinema ===
| Year | Title | Role | Notes | Ref. |
|---|---|---|---|---|
| 2024 | Robot Salvaje | Voice | Soundtrack | |

=== TV ===
==== As a competitor ====
| Year | Títle | Channel | Notes | Ref. |
|---|---|---|---|---|
| 2019 | Got Talent España | Telecinco | Competitor, Finalista | |
| 2022 | La Voz | Antena 3 | Competitor, Eliminada en la fase de asaltos | |
| 2023-2024 | Operación Triunfo 2023 | Prime Video | Competitor, 9.ª expulsada | |

==== As a guest or interviewee ====
| Year | Title | Channel | Notes | Ref. |
|---|---|---|---|---|
| 2024 | OT al Día | Prime Video | Interviewee (1 program) | |
| 2024 | Premios Ídolo 2024 | Movistar Plus+ | Guest, performance | |
| 2024 | LOS40 Music Awards | Movistar Plus+ | Guest | |
| 2024 | Masterchef Celebrity | La 1 | Guest, performance | |
| 2024 | Nochevieja contigo | Telecinco | Performance | |
| 2025 | Play Zeta | Playz | Interviewee (1 program) | |
| 2025 | Diario 24 | 24 Horas RTVE | Interviewee (1 program) | — |
| 2025 | La selva | TV3 (Cataluña) | Guest, performance (1 program) | |
| 2025 | La Voz Kids | Antena 3 | Guest, performance (1 program) | |
| 2025 | La Voz | Antena 3 | Co-coach of Pablo López (4 programs) | |
