= Mayte Macanás =

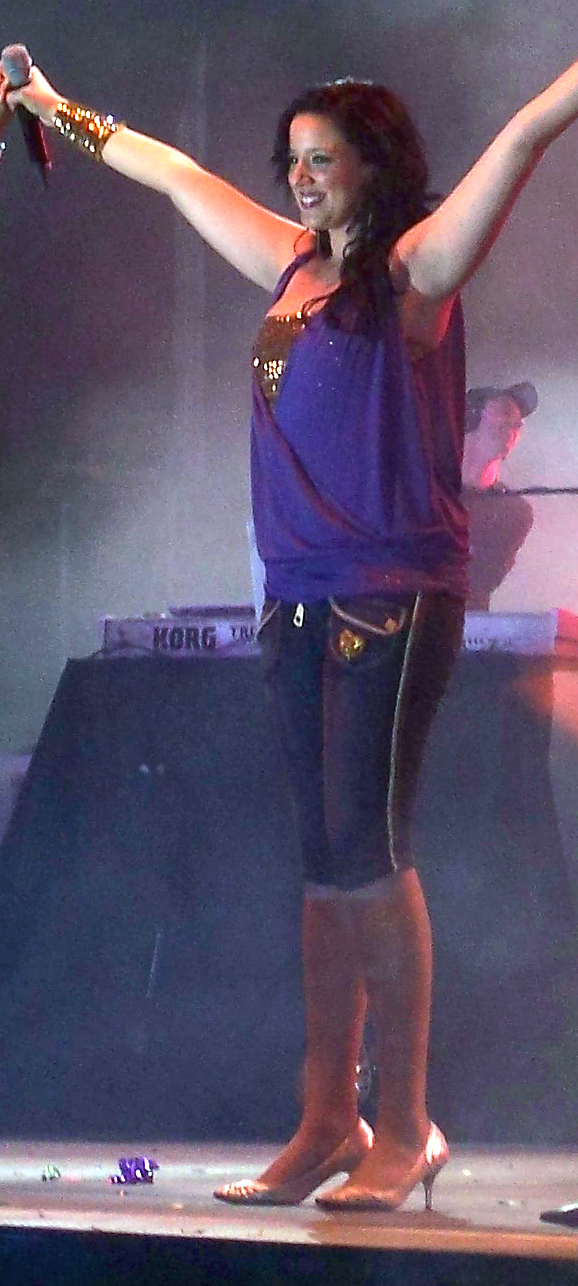

Background information
- Born: Mayte Gómez Macanás; 7 March 1984 (age 42)
- Origin: Murcia, Spain
- Genres: Pop; R&B; dance
- Years active: 2006–present
- Label: M.A.D. Entertainment
- Website: Official website

Mayte Gómez Macanás (born on March 7, 1984 in Murcia, Spain), known professionally as Mayte, is a Spanish singer and was 11th placed finalist on the fifth series of reality television show Operación Triunfo.

== Early life ==
During her childhood she played the piano and around the age of 16, she began to sing professionally. She studied piano about two years in an academy, has sung in orchestras and also recorded several demo tapes. She also won several galas in her native city, Murcia. At 20 years old, she studied Tourism.

== Operación Triunfo 2006 ==
After several previous attempts, At 22 she tried out for Operación Triunfo in the summer of 2006 and was selected from over 23,000 aspirants.

During her stay in Operación Triunfo, she sang a total of eight songs live, recorded various studio covers, and also composed with fellow contestants, Mercedes Durán and Moritz Antón, a song entitled "Dos Mares" ("Two Seas"), which became the theme song for the “Operación Triunfo 2006: Adelante” soundtrack. In this album she also did a duet with fellow contestant, Jorge González, with the song "Volver a sentir" (“To return to feel”). In addition to other participations in the disc. She surpassed two nominations of the jury to leave the academy. The third time she was nominated was her last as she didn't obtain enough votes from the public and was eliminated. On 26 November 2006 Mayte left the show between diverse controversies due to the supposed injustice of her nominations.

== Post O.T. ==
After she left the program she embarked on a national tour all over Spain with her fellow Operacion Triunfo finalists.

In 2008, Mayte tried out for the Eurovision Song Contest with her debut single entitled - Even though she was a favorite, she did not obtain enough votes to make it through to the Spanish preselection national finals. Mayte has recently been working on her highly anticipated debut album. The album is set to have an urban/R&B feel in the vein of Craig David and Mary J. Blige. The record will be released sometime in 2009. Some song clips can currently be heard on her Myspace page

== Artistic experience/concourses and awards ==
- Soloist singer in magazine of varieties, year 2003, Murcia
- Principal singer in the orchestra “Royal Music”, Murcia, season 2003-2004
- Singer in duet with Salvador Pérez Ortega, "Dúo Macaró", from 2004 to 2006
- Participant like invited artist in diverse programs of playful character of television and radio of the Region of Murcia
- Participation in an announcement for “Perfumerias If”, of national diffusion
- Participant in a campaign of “Global Humanitaria”, for national television
- 2003—2nd Award "Archena busca una estrella" ("Archena is looking for a star"), Murcia
- 2003—3rd Award "Embrujo de canciones" ("Songs charming"), Murcia
- 2004—2nd Award "Estrellas de Murcia" ("Stars from Murcia"), Murcia
- 2005—3rd Award "Archena busca una estrella" ("Archena is looking for a star"), duet with Salvador Pérez Ortega
- 2005—1st Award "Estrellas de Murcia" ("Stars from Murcia"), duet with Salvador Salvador Pérez Ortega
- 2006—Participant of "Operación Triunfo", Telecinco

== Discography ==
Álbum	Información
Operación Triunfo 2006: The Galas	Gala 0: "Adelante"; "Voy A Vivir"; Galas 1 and 2: "Lo Echamos A Suertes" (duet with Vanessa González); "Tu Corazón" (duet with José Galisteo); Galas 3 and 4: "Tu Peor Error" (duet with Saray Ramírez); "Eras Tú"; Galas 5 and 6: "Teresa" (duet with Eva Carreras); "Va Todo Al Ganador"; Galas 7 and 8: "Profundo Valor"
Operación Triunfo 2006: Adelante	CD 1: 01. "Adelante" (with all); 02. "Dos Mares" (with all); 10. "Abriendo Caminos" (with all and Diego Torres); 12. "Volver A Sentir" (duet with Jorge González); 14. "Silencio" (with all and David Bisbal); CD 2: 16. "Lo Echamos A Suertes" (duet with Vanessa González)
