= Estadi Olímpic Lluís Companys =

Stadium in Barcelona, Catalonia, Spain

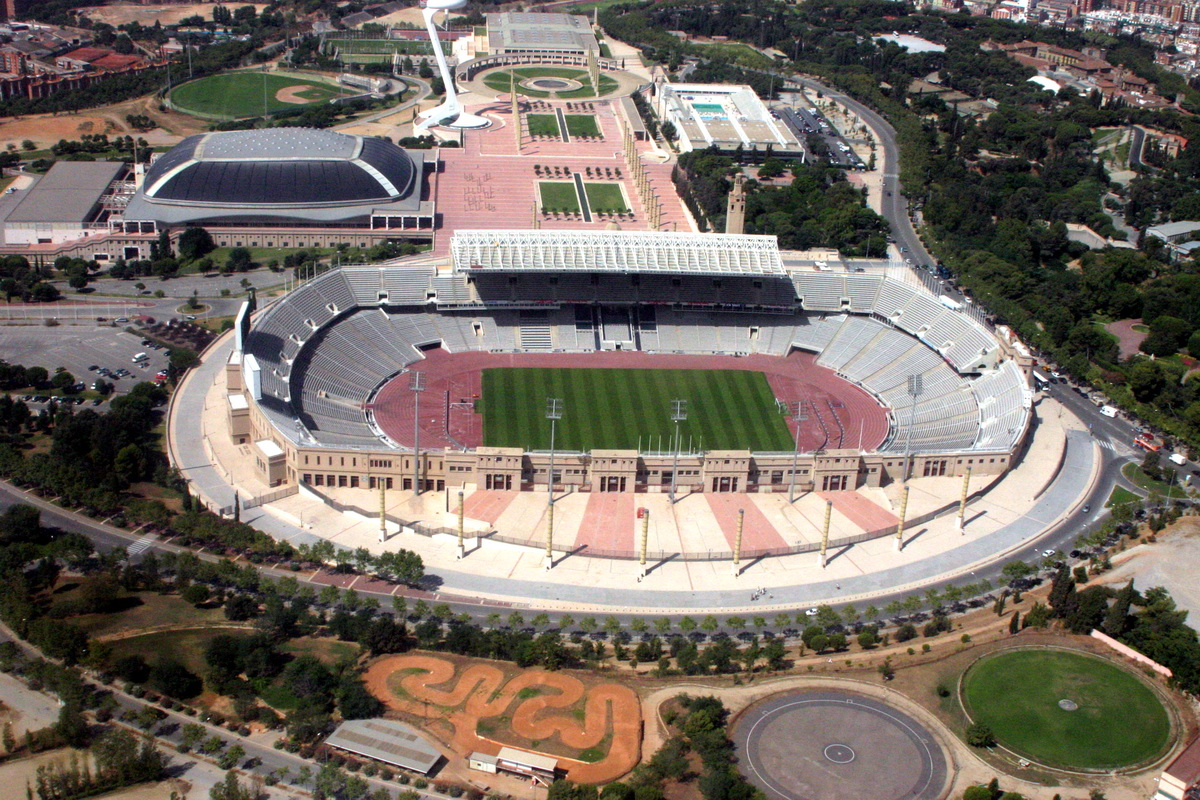
- Aerial view UEFA
- Interactive map of Estadi Olímpic Lluís Companys
- Former names: Estadi de Montjuïc (1929–85); Estadi Olímpic de Montjuïc (1989–2001)
- Location: Pg. Olímpic, 17-19
- Coordinates: 41°21′53″N 2°9′20″E
- Owner: Barcelona City Council
- Operator: Barcelona de Serveis Municipals (B:SM)
- Capacity: 55,926

Construction
- Built: 1927; 99 years ago
- Opened: 20 May 1929; 97 years ago
- Renovated: 1985–89
- Cost: 288 million pesetas
- Architect: Pere Domènech i Roura
- Structural engineer: Arup

Tenants
- Barcelona Dragons (1991–92, 1995–2002); Espanyol (1997–2009); Barcelona (2023–2025)

Website
- estadiolimpic.barcelona

Lluís Companys Olympic Stadium, also known as Estadi Olímpic Lluís Companys, (Note: Catalan pronunciation: [əsˈtaði uˈlimpiɡ ʎuˈis kumˈpaɲs]) formerly known as the Estadi de Montjuïc and Estadi Olímpic de Montjuïc and also known in English as the Barcelona Olympic Stadium, is a stadium in Barcelona, Catalonia. Originally built in 1927 for the 1929 International Exposition in the city (and Barcelona's failed bid for the 1936 Summer Olympics, which were awarded to Berlin), it was renovated in 1989 to be the main stadium for the 1992 Summer Olympics and 1992 Summer Paralympics. The stadium is named after Lluís Companys, the 123rd president of the Generalitat de Catalunya (Government of Catalonia), who was executed by Francoist Spain.

With its current capacity of 55,926 seats (67,007 during the 1992 Olympics), it is the sixth-largest stadium in Spain and the second largest in Catalonia.

The stadium is located in the Anella Olímpica, on Montjuïc, a hill to the southwest of the city that overlooks the harbor.

== History ==
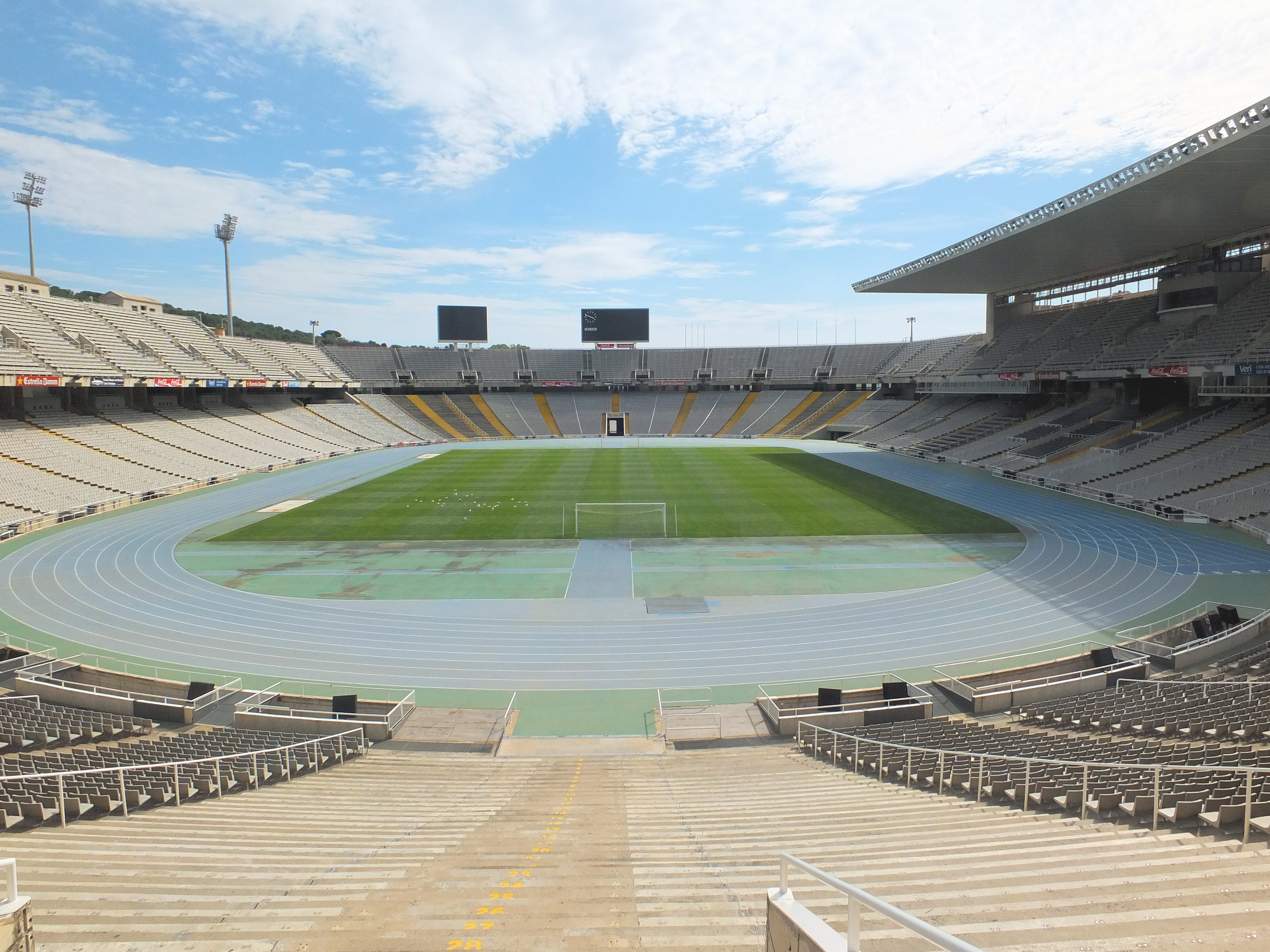
Internal view of the stadium in 2014

Designed by architect Pere Domènech i Roura for the 1929 Expo, the stadium was officially opened on 20 May 1929. The opening ceremonies included Spain's first official rugby international game against Italy, and a friendly football match between the Catalan national team and Bolton Wanderers, which the Catalan team won by a shocking score of 4–0 with goals from Josep Samitier (2), Martí Ventolrà and Manuel Parera.

It was meant to host the People's Olympiad in 1936, a protest event against the 1936 Summer Olympics in Berlin, but the event had to be canceled due to the outbreak of the Spanish Civil War.

In the fifties, the stadium was the centerpiece of the 1955 Mediterranean Games, and in 1957 it hosted the only national football cup final between Barcelona and Espanyol, the two local clubs.

In the seventies, the stadium was disused and the stands deteriorated. When the Spanish Grand Prix and other races were held at the Montjuïc racing circuit, the stadium was used as a paddock for the teams. Due to safety concerns, the 1975 F1 race was nearly boycotted by drivers.

During Barcelona's bid for the 1992 Summer Olympics, the stadium was totally renovated with the involvement of Italian architect Vittorio Gregotti. The stadium was gutted, preserving parts of the original facades, and new grandstands were built. In 1989, the venue was re-inaugurated for the World Cup in Athletics, and three years later it hosted the opening and closing ceremonies and all the athletics competitions of the Olympic Games and also the same functions during the Paralympics.

The stadium served as the home of Espanyol from 1997 until 2009.

It also served as the home of the Barcelona Dragons American football team from 1991 until 2002. Because the size of the playing surface was slightly shorter than the regulation American football length, the stadium only had seven-yard end zones, three yards shorter than regulation NFL size in 1991 and 1992. They were later lengthened to the standard ten yards. The stadium also played host to the National Football League's American Bowl in 1993 and in 1994. The San Francisco 49ers played the Pittsburgh Steelers on 1 August 1993. The second game was played on 31 July 1994 between the Los Angeles Raiders and the Denver Broncos.

In 2001, the stadium was renamed after the former president of the Generalitat de Catalunya Lluís Companys, who was executed at the nearby Montjuïc Castle in 1940 by the Franco regime. In 2010, the stadium hosted the 20th European Athletics Championships.

For the 2023–24 and the 2024–25 seasons, the stadium served as the home ground for FC Barcelona during the redevelopment of the Camp Nou. Barcelona returned to the stadium at the start of the 2025–26 season, with the partial reopening of Camp Nou having been delayed multiple times. While the club are set to return to the Camp Nou before the end of the 2026–27 season, they are expected to play once again at the Lluís Companys stadium for a brief period at the start of the 2027–28 season while the installation of a new roof at their home stadium completed, with the Montjuïc stadium reserved for this purpose until December 2027.

Pope Leo XIV led a vigil in front of more than 40,000 people on 9 June 2026 during his Visit by Pope Leo XIV to Spain.

== Events ==
=== Sports ===
- 1929: Montjuïc hosted its first ever event, Spain's first official rugby international game against Italy. Spain won 9–0.
- 1935: Boxing match Paolino Uzcudun vs. Max Schmeling
- 1955: II Mediterranean Games.
- 1989: IAAF World Cup.
- 1992: Games of the XXV Olympiad and IX Paralympic Games.
- 1993: Rugby League European Cup Final, XIII Catalans 22–23 Huddersfield RLFC
- 1997: World Bowl '97 between Barcelona Dragons and Rhein Fire.
- 2003: World Police and Fire Games.
- 2009: On Saturday 20 June the Perpignan-based rugby league team, Catalans Dragons lost 12–24 to Warrington Wolves in the first Super League match to be played in Spain, drawing a crowd of over 18,500.
- 2010: 20th European Athletics Championships.
- 2011: 2010–11 Heineken Cup quarter-final match between Perpignan and Toulon with a crowd of 55,000.
- 2012: 2012 World Junior Championships in Athletics.

==== Football ====
- 1930: National football cup final between Athletic Bilbao and Real Madrid.
- 1933: National football cup final between Athletic Bilbao and Real Madrid.
- 1934: National football cup final between Valencia and Real Madrid.
- 1939: National football cup final between Sevilla and Racing de Ferrol.
- 1944: National football cup final between Athletic Bilbao and Valencia.
- 1945: National football cup final between Athletic Bilbao and Valencia.
- 1946: National football cup final between Real Madrid and Valencia.
- 1957: National football cup final between Barcelona and Espanyol.
- 1997–2009: Espanyol home fixtures in all competitions until the construction of the RCDE Stadium.
- 2004: National football cup final between Real Madrid and Real Zaragoza.
- 2023–2025: Barcelona home fixtures in all competitions due to the renovations of the Camp Nou.

Spain national team matches

Date	Opponent	Score	Competition
1 January 1930	Czechoslovakia	1–0	Friendly match
26 April 1931	Republic of Ireland	1–1	Friendly match
23 February 1936	Germany	1–2	Friendly match
30 May 1948	Republic of Ireland	2–1	Friendly match
2 January 1949	Belgium	1–1	Friendly match
29 March 2000	Italy	2–0	Friendly match
13 February 2002	Portugal	1–1	Friendly match
18 February 2004	Peru	2–1	Friendly match

Andorra national team matches

Date	Opponent	Score	Competition
9 June 1999	France	0–1	UEFA Euro 2000 qualifying
28 March 2007	England	0–3	UEFA Euro 2008 qualifying
6 September 2008	England	0–2	2010 FIFA World Cup qualification

Catalonia national rugby league team matches

Date	Opponent	Score	Competition	Attendance
20 June 2009	Czech Republic	52–10	Friendly	18,150

=== Music ===
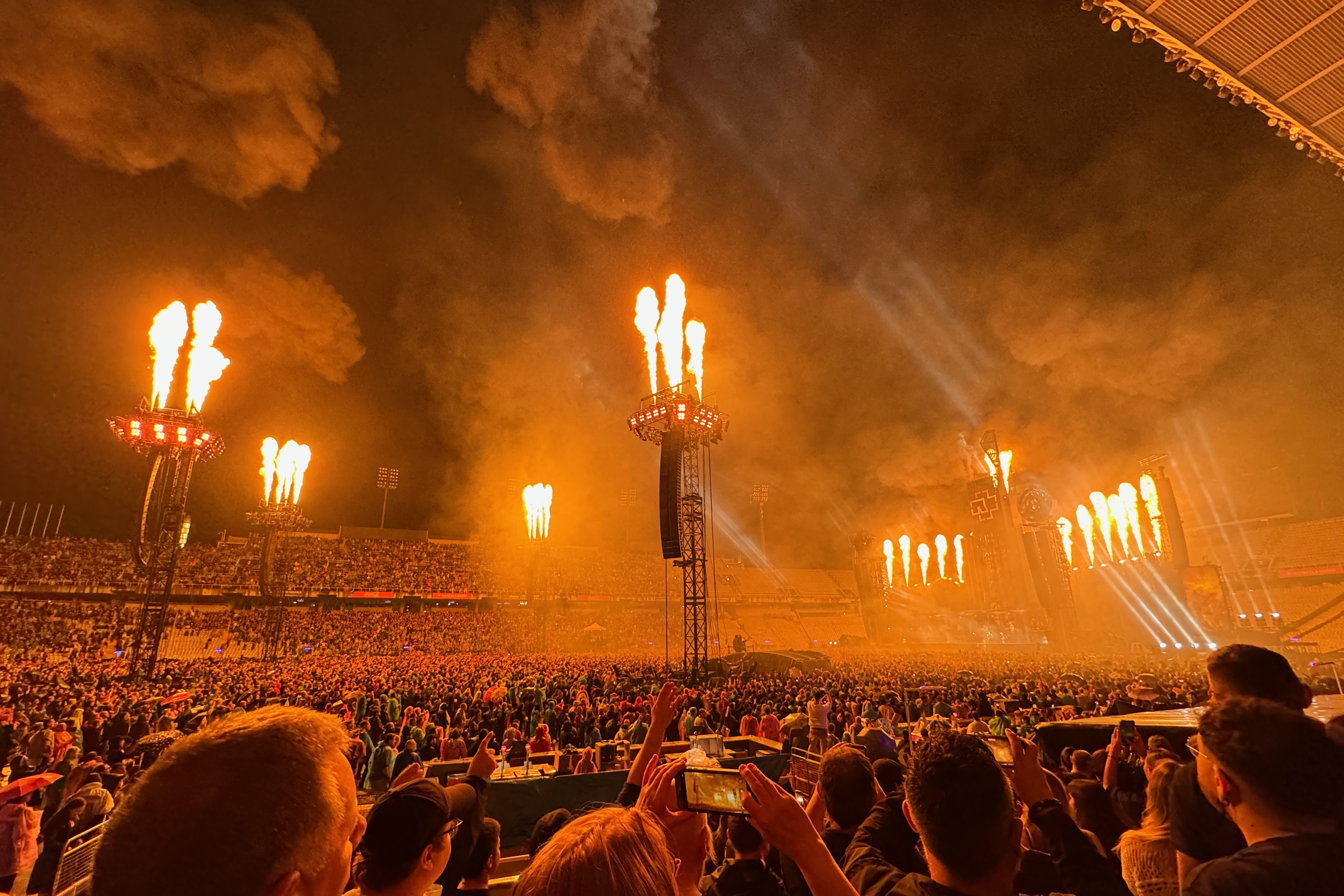
Rammstein performs during a pouring rain at Estadi Olímpic, Barcelona Spain, June 11, 2024

Date	Origin	Artist	Event	Opening Act	Attendance	Revenue
7 October 1989	Spain	Mecano	Música para vivir (Note: Benefit concert to raise money to against drugs. Organized by Fundación FAD Juventud, formerly known as Fundación de Ayuda contra la Drogadicción.)	Víctor Manuel; Duncan Dhu; Miguel Bosé; Mercedes Ferrer; La Unión; Los Rebeldes; Poch; Los Toreros Muertos; La Guardia; Danza Invisible	65,000 / 65,000	—
13 June 1990	United Kingdom	The Rolling Stones	Urban Jungle Tour	Gun	—	—
14 June 1990	United Kingdom	The Rolling Stones	Urban Jungle Tour	Gun	—	—
25 July 1990	United States	Prince	Nude Tour	—	49,455 / 49,455	—
1 August 1990	United States	Madonna	Blond Ambition World Tour	—	—	—
5 October 1990	United States	Tina Turner	Foreign Affair: The Farewell Tour	—	—	—
6 October 1990	United States	Tina Turner	Foreign Affair: The Farewell Tour	—	—	—
24 September 1991	Australia	AC/DC	Monsters of Rock	Metallica; Tesla; Legion	—	—
18 September 1992	United States	Michael Jackson	Dangerous World Tour	Rozalla	60,000 / 60,000	—
11 May 1993	United States	Bruce Springsteen	1992-1993 World Tour	—	—	—
5 July 1993	United States	Guns N' Roses	Use Your Illusion Tour	—	—	—
6 October 1993	France	Jean-Michel Jarre	Europe in Concert	El Último de la Fila	—	—
27 July 1994	United Kingdom	Pink Floyd	The Division Bell Tour	—	—	—
13 June 1995	United States	Bon Jovi	These Days Tour	Van Halen	—	—
13 September 1997	Ireland	U2	Popmart Tour	Placebo	60,096 / 60,096	$2,281,165
20 July 1998	United Kingdom	The Rolling Stones	Bridges to Babylon Tour	Hothouse Flowers	52,375 / 52,375	$2,464,319
17 May 2003	United States	Bruce Springsteen	The Rising Tour	—	—	—
21 June 2003	United States	Metallica	Summer Sanitarium Tour	—	—	—
29 June 2003	United Kingdom	The Rolling Stones	Licks World Tour	—	—	—
2 July 2003	Spain	El Canto del Loco; La Oreja de Van Gogh	MoviStar Activa	—	—	—
21 June 2007	United Kingdom	The Rolling Stones	A Bigger Bang Tour	Jet, Biffy Clyro, Loquillo y los Trogloditas	—	—
30 June 2007	Mexico	RBD	Celestial World Tour	Diego Boneta	—	—
27 September 2007	United Kingdom	The Police	Reunion Tour	Fiction Plane	54,553 / 54,553	$5,554,320
1 June 2008	United States	Bon Jovi	Lost Highway Tour	NoWayOut, Sabia	46,255 / 46,255	$4,046,421
7 June 2009	Australia	AC/DC	Black Ice World Tour	The Answer	64,196 / 64,376	$5,906,138
21 July 2009	United States	Madonna	Sticky & Sweet Tour	Paul Oakenfold	44,811 / 44,811	$5,010,557
4 September 2009	United Kingdom	Coldplay	Viva la Vida Tour	The Flaming Lips	63,306 / 64,376	$4,554,068
3 December 2009	United Kingdom	The Prodigy	European Stadium Tour	Enter Shikari	—	—
4 December 2009	United States	Marilyn Manson	The High End of Low Tour	esOterica	—	—
9 April 2011	United States	We Are Scientists	Brain Thrust Mastery Tour	Els Pets	—	—
29 May 2011	Colombia	Shakira	The Sun Comes Out World Tour	—	24,112 / 43,500	$612,989
27 July 2011	United States	Bon Jovi	Bon Jovi Live	The Rebels, The Monomes	39,992 / 39,992	$3,021,325
17 May 2012	United States	Bruce Springsteen	Wrecking Ball Tour	—	79,430 / 86,000	$6,692,818
18 May 2012	United States	Bruce Springsteen	Wrecking Ball Tour	—	79,430 / 86,000	$6,692,818
7 June 2013	United Kingdom	Muse	The 2nd Law World Tour	You Don't Know Me	—	—
8 July 2014	United Kingdom	One Direction	Where We Are Tour	5 Seconds of Summer, Abraham Mateo	40,333 / 40,333	$3,391,560
29 May 2015	Australia	AC/DC	Rock or Bust World Tour	Vintage Trouble	60,000 / 60,000	—
26 May 2016	United Kingdom	Coldplay	A Head Full of Dreams Tour	Alessia Cara; Lianne La Havas	111,261 / 111,261	$9,734,130
27 May 2016	United Kingdom	Coldplay	A Head Full of Dreams Tour	Alessia Cara; Lianne La Havas	111,261 / 111,261	$9,734,130
3 August 2016	United States	Beyoncé	The Formation World Tour	Chloe x Halle	45,346 / 45,346	$4,806,995
18 July 2017	Ireland	U2	The Joshua Tree Tour 2017	Noel Gallagher's High Flying Birds	54,551 / 54,551	$5,930,076
27 September 2017	United Kingdom	The Rolling Stones	No Filter Tour	Los Zigarros	58,622 / 58,622	$8,769,703
20 June 2018	United States	Bruno Mars	24K Magic World Tour	DNCE	—	—
1 July 2018	United States	Guns N' Roses	Not in This Lifetime Tour	Volbeat, Nothing More	48,649 / 48,649	$4,370,000
11 July 2018	United States	Beyoncé Jay-Z	On The Run II Tour	—	46,982 / 46,982	$4,733,549
5 May 2019	United States	Metallica	WorldWired Tour	Ghost, Bokassa	51,799 / 53,760	$5,285,919
7 June 2019	United Kingdom	Ed Sheeran	Divide Tour	Anne-Marie, James Bay	54,658 / 54,658	$4,126,520
7 June 2022	United States	Red Hot Chili Peppers	Unlimited Love Tour	Nas, Thundercat	—	—
29 July 2022	United Kingdom	Iron Maiden	Legacy of the Beast World Tour	Within Temptation, Airbourne	—	—
28 April 2023	United States	Bruce Springsteen	2023–2025 Tour	—	—	—
30 April 2023	United States	Bruce Springsteen	2023–2025 Tour	—	—	—
24 May 2023	United Kingdom	Coldplay	Music of the Spheres World Tour	Chvrches; Porij	224,761 / 224,761	$27,262,896
25 May 2023	United Kingdom	Coldplay	Music of the Spheres World Tour	Chvrches; Porij	224,761 / 224,761	$27,262,896
27 May 2023	United Kingdom	Coldplay	Music of the Spheres World Tour	Chvrches; Porij	224,761 / 224,761	$27,262,896
28 May 2023	United Kingdom	Coldplay	Music of the Spheres World Tour	Chvrches; Porij	224,761 / 224,761	$27,262,896
8 June 2023	United States	Beyoncé	Renaissance World Tour	Arca	52,889 / 52,889	$7,395,529
12 July 2023	United Kingdom	Harry Styles	Love On Tour	Wet Leg	—	—
20 July 2023	Canada	The Weeknd	After Hours til Dawn Tour	Kaytranada, Mike Dean	54,017 / 54,017	$5,484,112
11 June 2024	Germany	Rammstein	Rammstein Stadium Tour	Abélard	50,183 / 50,183	$5,376,563
20 June 2024	United States	Bruce Springsteen	2023–2025 Tour	—	—	—
22 June 2024	United States	Bruce Springsteen	2023–2025 Tour	—	—	—
10 July 2024	Spain	Estopa	Gira 25 Aniversario	—	—	—
9 June 2025	United States	Guns N' Roses	2025 Tour	Rival Sons	—	—
1 July 2025	United States	Imagine Dragons	Loom World Tour	Declan McKenna	—	—
10 July 2025	Spain	Lola Indigo	La Bruja, La Niña y El Dragón	—	—	—
19 July 2025	Spain	Aitana	Metamorfosis Season	Julieta	48,000 / 48,000	$3,438,263
30 July 2025	United States	Kendrick Lamar + SZA	Grand National Tour	Mustard	—	—
9 August 2025	South Korea	Blackpink	Deadline World Tour	—	—	—
12 September 2025	United States	Post Malone	Big Ass Stadium Tour	Jelly Roll	—	—
3 May 2026	Spain	El Último de la Fila	2026 Tour	—	—	—
7 May 2026	Spain	El Último de la Fila	2026 Tour	—	—	—
22 May 2026	Puerto Rico	Bad Bunny	Debí Tirar Más Fotos World Tour	Chuwi	—	—
23 May 2026	Puerto Rico	Bad Bunny	Debí Tirar Más Fotos World Tour	Chuwi	—	—
23 July 2026	Puerto Rico	Don Omar	Cook Music Fest	Beéle, Greeicy	—	—
1 September 2026	Canada	The Weeknd	After Hours til Dawn Tour	Playboi Carti, Prince 85	—	—
12 September 2026	South Korea; Japan	Ateez; Enhypen; Nmixx (Note: Haewon, member of Nmixx, did not perform due to a health issue.@nmixxpics_ (12 September 2026). "Haewon will not be performing" (Tweet) – via X (formerly Twitter).) xikers NCT Wish; Cortis; Alpha Drive One	Music Bank World Tour	—	—	—
7 October 2026	Spain	Oques Grasses	L'Últim concert	—	—	—
8 October 2026	Spain	Oques Grasses	L'Últim concert	—	—	—
9 October 2026	Spain	Oques Grasses	L'Últim concert	—	—	—
10 October 2026	Spain	Oques Grasses	L'Últim concert	—	—	—
13 May 2027	Ireland	U2	The Greatest Show on Earth World Tour	Wolf Alice	—	—
15 May 2027	Ireland	U2	The Greatest Show on Earth World Tour	Wolf Alice	—	—
17 May 2027	Ireland	U2	The Greatest Show on Earth World Tour	Wolf Alice	—	—
3 June 2027	Colombia	Karol G	Viajando Por El Mundo Tropitour	—	—	—
4 June 2027	Colombia	Karol G	Viajando Por El Mundo Tropitour	—	—	—
18 June 2027	Spain	Estopa	Gira de la MKT	—	—	—
20 June 2027	Spain	Estopa	Gira de la MKT	—	—	—
10 July 2027	United Kingdom	Oasis	Live '27 Tour	Richard Ashcroft	—	—
11 July 2027	United Kingdom	Oasis	Live '27 Tour	Richard Ashcroft	—	—
24 July 2027	South Korea	Stray Kids	Run It World Tour	—	—	—

== Notes ==
Preceded by Seoul Olympic Stadium; Seoul	Summer Olympics; Opening and Closing Ceremonies (Olympic Stadium); 1992	Succeeded by Centennial Olympic Stadium; Atlanta
Preceded by Seoul Olympic Stadium; Seoul	Olympic Athletics competitions Main Venue; 1992	Succeeded by Centennial Olympic Stadium; Atlanta
Preceded by Ullevi; Gothenburg	European Athletics Championships; Main Venue; 2010	Succeeded by Olympiastadion; Helsinki
Preceded by Moncton Stadium; Moncton	IAAF World Junior Championships in Athletics; Main Venue; 2012	Succeeded by Hayward Field; Eugene
