= Daniel Zueras =

Spanish singer

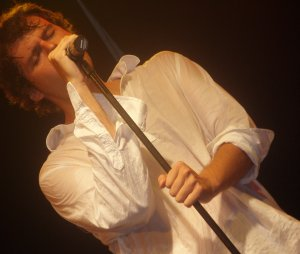

Background information
- Born: Daniel Zueras Herreros; November 13, 1980 (age 45); Zaragoza, Aragón, Spain
- Years active: 2006–present
- Label: Universal- ValeMusic (2007-2008)
- Website: www.danielzueras.com

Daniel Zueras is a Spanish singer. In 2006, he was the runner-up in series 5 of Operación Triunfo, a singing competition reality television program in Spain. In 2007, he released his solo album, Siempre Sale El Sol and the single "No Quiero Enamorarme".

== Biography ==
Born in Zaragoza on November 13, 1980, he started to show his interest in music as a child. Son of a commercial agent and a cook, he studied music theory and piano. He loves running but, above all, singing. Before entering Operación Triunfo in 2006, he worked as a waiter in the weekends at a theater in Zaragoza, but has always wished to devote himself to music. One of his idols is Mariah Carey.

=== Operación Triunfo ===
In 2006, Zueras auditioned for Operación Triunfo in Barcelona, where he passed all the tests until he was admitted as one of the 20 finalists who would perform on Gala 0 of the show with presenter Jesús Vázquez.

Zueras stood out among his peers at the academy, singing Pop music and Ballads, with numbers like "Otra Vez", by Coti and Paulina Rubio, "Unchained Melody", by The Righteous Brothers, "Last Christmas" by George Michael, "Blue Velvet" by Bobby Vinton or "Me & Mrs. Jones" by Billy Paul, among others.

Zueras finished in second place, ahead of Leo and only a few votes behind Lorena Gómez, winner of the contest.

| | Nominees | 4favorites | Duel | Wins Duel |
|---|---|---|---|---|
| Gala 7 | Vanessa, Daniel, Eva, José (saved by teachers) | | | |
| Gala 8 | | Daniel, Jorge, Saray, Leo | | |
| Gala 9 | | Daniel, Lorena, Leo, Saray | | |
| Gala 10 | Favorite Daniel* | | | |
| Gala 12 | | | José 11.9%, Daniel 13.8% | Daniel 78% |
| Gala 13 | | Saved by viewers Daniel 28%, Saray 25%, Leo 19% | | |
| Gala 14 | | Saved by viewers Daniel 33.5%, Lorena 26.3% | | |
| Gala 15 | | Finalists: Leo, Lorena, Daniel | Daniel, Leo | Daniel 55.4% |
| Gala 16 | Winner Lorena 50.7% | 2nd place Daniel 49.3% | | |

*: 3 highest rated by the jury for the semifinals 1st Daniel 29.0 points, 2nd Saray 28.5 points, 3rd Lorena 26.0 points

=== Siempre Sale El Sol ===
After several months working in, Rome and Madrid, for his debut album, while combining the recording with the Operación Triunfo tour Adelante, April 23, 2007, saw the release of his first original solo album "Siempre Sale El Sol" (The Sun Always Comes Out) with pop themes, dance and R & B.

The first album single, “No Quiero Enamorarme” (I don't want to fall in love), had been released a week earlier (April 16). The song's video has had so far a large impact among the public, because of its depiction of Zueras participating in a threesome with a woman and another man. Zueras has stated that his primary intention with the video was to break away from the cliché of innocent boy with which he was labeled at the academy. In YouTube, the video has had more than 668,398 views in the 10 months following its release, and has received many supporting comments. The single made #5 in the charts the first week in Spain.

During the first 6 months following the release, Zueras has sold 25,000 copies of his album "Siempre Sale El Sol" (The Sun Always Comes Out), which made # 31 in the Spanish charts.

Zueras has received an award as Discovery Artist of year 2007 by the Group Vocento.

== Discography ==
=== Albums ===
| Year | Álbum | Chart |
| Year | Álbum | SPA |
|---|---|---|
| 2006 | "Lo mejor de Daniel y OT" | 2 |

Song list

Gala 0: Daniel Suspicious minds

Galas 1 and 2: Daniel y Eva -Otra vez * Daniel, José Antonio y Leo I'm a believer

Galas 3 and 4: Daniel Everlasting love * Daniel, Jose y Moritz Celebration

Galas 5 and 6: Daniel y Saray My endless love * Daniel y Eva True love

Galas 7 and 8: Daniel y Jorge Cuando nadie me ve * Daniel "Blue Velvet"

Galas 9 and 10: Daniel Always on my mind * Daniel "Unchained Melody"

Galas 11 and 12: Daniel Volverte a ver * Daniel The great pretender

Galas 13 and 14: Daniel Your song * Daniel Zueras Contigo aprendí

Galas 15 and 16: Daniel Zueras Me an Mrs. Jones * Daniel Zueras Overjoyed

Gala Operación Nochebuena: Daniel, José, José Antonio Last Christmas * Adelante * Dos Mares

Gala Especial Lorena: Daniel Yo no quiero enamorarme

| Year | Álbum | Chart |
| Year | Álbum | ESP |
|---|---|---|
| 2007 | "Siempre Sale El Sol" | 31 |

Song list

1. No Quiero Enamorarme
2. Siempre sale el sol
3. Baila
4. Fiel confidente
5. Dime que no es amor
6. Si juegas con fuego
7. Entre el amor y el dolor
8. El centro de tu vida
9. Mil recuerdos
10. La cara y cruz
11. Un amor sin final

=== Singles ===
| Year | Single | Chart |
| Year | Single | ESP |
|---|---|---|
| 2007 | "No Quiero Enamorarme" | 10 |

== Concerts ==
=== Adelante tour ===
24 and 25 MARCH - LLEIDA (Pavelló Barris Nord) Artists guests, Cristina and Vanessa.

APRIL 7-SANTANDER (Palais des Sports) Artists invited: Cristina and Eva.

APRIL 13-ZARAGOZA (Pavilion Prince Felipe) Artists invited: Vanessa and Eva.

APRIL 21-MADRID (Palacio Vistalegre) Artists invited: Cristina and Jose Antonio.

APRIL 28-BARCELONA (Palau Sant Jordi) Artists invited: Vanessa, Cristina and Xavier.

MAY 4-VALENCIA (Source San Luis Pavilion) Artists invited: Xavier and Cristina.

MAY 5-MURCIA (bullring) Artists invited: Mayte, Jose Antonio and Encarna.

MAY 12-FUERTEVENTURA (Los Pozos Stadium in Puerto del Rosario) Artists invited: Mayte and Jose Antonio.

MAY 19-MALAGA (Municipal Auditorium) Artists invited: Mayte, Jose Antonio and Encarna.

MAY 26-BILBAO (BEC) Artists invited: Cristina and Eva.

=== Siempre Sale El Sol tour ===
Friday July 27 Peguera (Majorca) Concert along with Jose Galisteo people come from Madrid, Valencia, Zaragoza, Barcelona ......

Saturday July 28 Gandia (Valencia) people come from Madrid, Valencia, Zaragoza, Barcelona ......

Her first solo concert was the day on August 14 in Ariño - Teruel. People who attended the concert from Madrid, Navarra, Malága, Valencia, Zaragoza, Barcelona, La Coruna, Alicante, Bilbao ........

Friday August 31 Alfafar (Valencia). Concert alongside his teammate Jorge Gonzalez. People who attended the concert from Madrid, Valencia, Zaragoza, Barcelona, La Coruna, Alicante ...........

Friday October 5 Zaragoza. Concert in Interpeñas. It opens the festivities with Peret. They were people from Madrid, Malága, Navarra, Valencia, spam ............. More than 20,000 people in the reciento.

== Events, performances, magazines ==
- Barcelona

He came to the inauguration of the Center for Jessica Expósito in Barcelona

He came to "Gas Light." April 27, 2007 in Barcelona

Interview Program Tony Rovira. May 3, 2007 in Barcelona

Interview Channel 4. May 3, 2007 in Barcelona

Served at the gala end of "Rain of Stars." July 6, 2007 in Barcelona

Served on the program Gala Eurodance. September 1 in Barcelona

- Bilbao

He promotion and inauguration in Disco Vip. May 14, 2007 in Bilbao

- Castilla Leon - Castilla La Mancha

Served on the Gala "Headhunters de Leon 2007. June 28, 2007 in Leon

He came to "Plaza Mayor" Belinda Washington. June 20, 2007 in Castilla-La Mancha

He came to the program "As we are." May 29, 2007 in Toledo

- Madrid

Promotion: Local TV, ABC, Zero Soon, HI 100, recording program Localia "Plató Open", "In touch, Aragon radio chat channel and ABC with Ono Bethlehem Burgos magazine" In Touch "in Madrid

Press Conference for the Gay Pride festivities (Europride Mado 2007). In Madrid

Recording of the program "Mad About Madrid." In Wave 6 TV in Madrid

The Gay Pride festivities (Europride Mado 2007). Speech and action

Part of Pasapalabra. On 30/31 August and September 3, 2007, in Madrid

He came on the agenda of Ana Rosa. May 8, 2007 in Madrid

He came on the agenda of today for you. May 8, 2007 in Madrid

He came to the program "Life in Pink" May 29, 2007

- Valencia

He came to the program this veranito .... A little more. July 31, 2007 in Valencia

- Zaragoza

Performances at parties in Quarter of Zalfonada. September 18, 2007 in Zaragoza

Gala Performance at Aragoneses year. May 9, 2007 in Aragon

Radio Rockola Radio Aragon. June 9, 2007 in Zaragoza

He came to the day "Mójate with sclerosis." July 8, 2007 in Zaragoza

He came to the program "Boulevard summer." In Aragon Television July 12, 2007 in Zaragoza

He came to the program Canta Conmigo Aragon TV. September 9, 2007 in Aragon

Interview Point Radio. May 1, 2007 in Aragon

Part of the program of Radio "This Is Ours." September 10, 2007 in Zaragoza

Part of the program of Radio "Anna in Point Radio." September 16, 2007 in Zaragoza
