= Vanessa González =

Vanessa González may refer to:

- Vanessa González (footballer) (born 1999), Mexican professional footballer
- Vanessa González (singer) (born 1983), Costa Rican singer-songwriter and actress

== See also ==
- Vanesa González (born 1987), Argentine actress
