= Lorena (album) =

Studio album by Lorena Gómez
- Released: 27 March 2007
- Recorded: February–March, 2007; Estudios Filigrana (Córdoba, Spain)
- Genre: Pop
- Length: 46:20
- Language: Spanish, English
- Label: Sony BMG
- Producer: Manuel Ruiz "Queco"

Lorena Gómez chronology
Lorena (2007)	De Película (2008)

Singles from Lorena
- 1. "Sin Medida" Released: March 2007; 2. "Otro Amor Vendrá" Released: July 2007; 3. "Miralá, Miraló" Released: November 2007

Lorena is the debut album of the Spanish singer Lorena Gómez. It was released on 27 March 2007 in Spain, two months after winning fifth series of Spanish OT in 2006. It is an album of personal covers of greatest hits of international artists that also includes two new songs.

The album entered and peaked at number 4 of the Spanish Top 100 Albums. Two singles were released from the album: "Sin Medida" in March 2007 and "Otro Amor Vendrá" in July 2007. As of September 2007, the album has sold more than 40,000 copies.

== Track listing ==
1. "Land of a Thousand Dances" (Hummon/Brokop) (Wilson Pickett cover) – 2:56
2. "Sin Medida" (Alejandro Abad) – 4:06
3. "Man! I Feel Like a Woman!" (Robert Lange/Shania Twain) (Shania Twain cover) – 3:57
4. "Angels" (Robbie Williams/Guy Cambres) (Robbie Williams cover) – 4:01
5. "Música" (Manuel Ruiz "Queco") – 3:56
6. "Otro Amor Vendrá" ("I Will Love Again") (Barry P./M.Taylor) (Lara Fabian cover) – 4:25
7. "Bohemian Rhapsody" (Freddie Mercury) (Queen cover) – 2:15
8. "Y Lloré" ("Cryin'") (Joe Perry, Taylor Rhodes, Steve Tyler) (Aerosmith cover) – 4:14
9. "Mi Corazón Continuará" ("My Heart Will Go On") (James Horner/Wilbur Jennings) (Celine Dion cover) – 4:35
10. "Still Loving You" (Klaus Meine/Rudolf Schenker) (Scorpions cover) – 4:24
11. "Born to Be Alive" (Patrick Hernandez) (Patrick Hernandez cover) – 3:23
12. "Miralá, Miraló" (Alejandra Guzmán) (Alejandra Guzmán cover) – 4:04

== Personnel ==
Technical:

- Manuel Ruiz "Queco" — record producer
- Eduardo Ruiz — recording engineer
- Antonio Algarrada — recording engineer, mixing engineer
- Nicola Almagro — recording engineer
- Roberto Maccagno — mixing engineer, mastering engineer
- Andrea Maccagno — mixing assistant

Musical:

- Lorena Gómez "Lorena" — lead vocals
- Ludovico Vagnone — Spanish guitar, acoustic guitar, electric guitar
- Antonio Ramos "Maca" — bass guitar
- Enzo Filippone — drums
- Tino Di Geraldo — bass guitar, drums
- Araceli Lavado — background vocals
- Carlos Lázaro — background vocals
- Raúl Ruiz — keyboards, programming
- Alberto Miras — keyboards, programming
- Carlos Vera — keyboards, programming
- Nicola Almagro — keyboards, programming

== Chart performance ==
Chart	Peak	Sales/certifications
Spanish Top 100 Albums	4	Sales: 40.000+ Certification: Gold
European Top 100 Albums	60	

== Singles ==
- "Sin Medida" was the first single of the album, was released as the album in March 2007. The videoclip was released a month later, it was recorded in Lleida. The song is O.S.T. of the miniserie La Bella Otero.
- "Otro Amor Vendrá" was the second single of the album, was released in the beginnings of July 2007. It is a cover of the 2000 hit "I Will Love Again" of Lara Fabian. There was not a videoclip released for this single.
- "Miralá, Miraló" was the third single of the album, was released in November 2007. It is a cover of Alejandra Guzmán. There was not a videoclip released for this single.

== Criticism ==
The album was not exempt of critics for choose to make a covers album as a debut. Lorena answered that record period was not too long (exactly 3 days of record for her voice), that was an original idea never done with a winner of Operación Triunfo, and that this songs were special for her and wanted to sing in an album.
