= Dos Mares =

Single by Operación Triunfo 2006

from the album Operación Triunfo 2006: Adelante
- Released: December 2006
- Recorded: 2006
- Genre: Pop
- Label: Santander Records
- Songwriters: Mayte, Mercedes and Moritz

Operación Triunfo 2006 singles chronology
"Adelante" (2006)	"Dos Mares" (2006)

Dos Mares, is the second official single from Operación Triunfo 2006: Adelante album. The single was released in Spain January 2007.

The song was written and composed by Mayte, Mercedes and Moritz, contestants of the 5th series of Operación Triunfo

== Charts ==
Chart (2006)	Peak position
Spain Los 40	-
Spain Hot 100	-
Spain Nielsen Airplay	96
