= Operación Triunfo series 5 =

Operación Triunfo
- Series 5
- Hosted by: Jesús Vázquez
- Judges: Noemí Galera; Risto Mejide; Javier Llano; Alejandro Abad
- Winner: Lorena Gómez
- Runner-up: Daniel Zueras
- Location: Parc Audiovisual de Catalunya, Terrassa, Barcelona

Release
- Original network: Telecinco
- Original release: 8 October 2006 – 26 January 2007

Series chronology
- ← Previous; Series 4 Next → Series 6

Operación Triunfo is a Spanish reality television music competition to find new singing talent. The fifth series, also known as Operación Triunfo 2006, aired on Telecinco from 8 October 2006 to 26 January 2007, presented by Jesús Vázquez.

Lorena Gómez was the winner of the series.

== Headmaster, judges and presenter ==
- Headmaster: Kike Santander
- Judges: Noemí Galera, Risto Mejide, Javier Llano and Alejandro Abad
- Presenter: Jesús Vázquez

== Contestants ==
Contestant	Age	Residence	Episode of elimination	Place finished
Lorena	20	Lleida	Gala Final	Winner
Daniel	26	Zaragoza	Gala Final	Runner-up
Leo	25	Valencia	Gala 15	3rd
Saray	25	Tuineje	Gala 14	4th
Mortiz	29	Málaga	Gala 13	5th
José	28	Viladecans	Gala 12	6th
Ismael	18	Mataró	Gala 11	7th
Jorge	18	Villarejo de Salvanés	Gala 10	8th
Eva	26	Vigo	Gala 9	9th
Vanessa	28	Bigues i Riells	Gala 8	10th
Mayte	22	Murcia	Gala 7	11th
Mercedes	24	Chiclana	Gala 6	12th
Cristina	16	Cuenca	Gala 5	13th
José Antonio	22	Mérida	Gala 4	14th
Xavier	20	Vinaròs	Gala 3	15th
Encarna	22	Almería	Gala 2	16th
Claritzel	24	Tenerife	Gala 0	Not selected
Melissa	18	San Miguel de Salinas	Gala 0	Not selected

== Galas ==
=== Results summary ===
Colour key

–	The contestant was the weekly public's favourite and was exempt from nominations
–	The contestant was up for elimination, but was saved by the academy staff
–	Contestant was up for the elimination but was saved by the contestants
–	Contestant was up for the elimination but was immediately saved by the public votes
-	The contestant was nominated to leave the Academy
–	The contestant was the winner of a duel

	Gala 0	Gala 1	Gala 2	Gala 3	Gala 4	Gala 5	Gala 6	Gala 7	Gala 8	Gala 9	Gala 10	Gala 11	Gala 12	Gala 13	Gala 14	Gala 15	Final
Lorena	Saved	Saved	Saved	Saved	Saved	Saved	Favourite	Saved	Saved	Nominated	Mark: 8.7	Finalist	Saved	Duel	Saved	Saved	Winner
Daniel	Saved	Saved	Saved	Saved	Saved	Saved	Saved	Nominated	Saved	Saved	Mark: 9.7	Finalist	Duel	Saved	Saved	Saved	Runner-up
Leo	Saved	Saved	Saved	Saved	Nominated	Saved	Saved	Saved	Saved	Nominated	Mark: 6.8	Finalist	Saved	Saved	Saved	3rd Place	
Saray	Saved	Favourite	Favourite	Favourite	Saved	Favourite	Saved	Saved	Favourite	Favourite	Mark: 9.5	Finalist	Saved	Saved	4th place		
Moritz	Saved	Saved	Nominated	Saved	Saved	Saved	Nominated	Saved	Saved	Saved	Mark: 7.8	Finalist	Saved	5th place			
José	Saved	Saved	Nominated	Saved	Saved	Saved	Nominated	Nominated	Saved	Saved	Mark: 6.0	Finalist	6th place				
Ismael	Saved	Saved	Saved	Saved	Nominated	Saved	Saved	Saved	Nominated	Saved	Mark: 6.7	Eliminated					
Jorge	Saved	Saved	Saved	Saved	Favourite	Saved	Saved	Favourite	Nominated	Nominated	Eliminated						
Eva	Saved	Saved	Saved	Saved	Saved	Saved	Saved	Saved	Nominated	Eliminated							
Vanessa	Saved	Saved	Saved	Saved	Saved	Nominated	Saved	Nominated	Eliminated								
Mayte	Saved	Saved	Saved	Nominated	Saved	Nominated	Nominated	Eliminated									
Mercedes	Saved	Saved	Saved	Nominated	Saved	Nominated	Eliminated										
Cristina	Saved	Nominated	Saved	Saved	Nominated	Eliminated											
José Antonio	Saved	Saved	Saved	Nominated	Eliminated												
Xavier	Saved	Nominated	Nominated	Eliminated													
Encarna	Saved	Nominated	Eliminated														
Clartizell	Eliminated																
Melissa	Eliminated																
Up for elimination	Clartizell; José; Melissa; Xavier	Cristia; Encarna; Mercedes; Xavier	Cristina; José; Moritz; Xavier	Jorge; José Antonio; Mayte; Mercedes	Cristina; Eva; Ismael; Leo	Eva; Mayte; Mercedes; Vanessa	Eva; José; Mayte; Moritz	Daniel; Eva; José; Vanessa	Eva; Ismael; Jorge; José	Jorge; José; Leo; Lorena	Jorge; José; Leo; Moritz	Against public vote	Daniel; José	Lorena; Moritz	Leo; Saray	Daniel; Leo	Daniel; Lorena
Saved by Academy's staff	None	Cristina	Moritz	Mercedes	Ismael	Vanessa	José	Daniel	Ismael	Lorena	Moritz	Winner	Daniel; 78% to save	Lorena; 62% to save	Leo; 54.4% to save	Daniel; 55.4% to save	Lorena; 50.7% to win
Saved by contestants	None	Mercedes; 7 of 13 votes to save	Cristina; 7 of 12 votes to save	Jorge; 4* of 11 votes to save	Eva; 5 of 10 votes to save	Eva; 5 of 9 votes to save	Eva; 5 of 8 votes to save	Eva; 4 of 7 votes to save	José; 3 of 6 votes to save	José; 4 of 5 votes to save	Leo; 2* of 4 votes to save	Winner	Daniel; 78% to save	Lorena; 62% to save	Leo; 54.4% to save	Daniel; 55.4% to save	Lorena; 50.7% to win
Saved by public vote	José; 41% to save	Xavier; 53% to save	José; 52% to save	Mayte; 53% to save	Leo; 58% to save	Mayte; 54% to save	Moritz; 58% to save	José; 74% to save	Jorge; 54% to save	Leo; 50.5% to save	José; 56% to save	Eliminated Finalist	José; 22% to save	Moritz; 38% to save	Saray; 45.6% to save	Leo; 44.6% to save	Daniel; 49.3% to win
Saved by public vote	Xavier; 27% to save	Xavier; 53% to save	José; 52% to save	Mayte; 53% to save	Leo; 58% to save	Mayte; 54% to save	Moritz; 58% to save	José; 74% to save	Jorge; 54% to save	Leo; 50.5% to save	José; 56% to save	Eliminated Finalist	José; 22% to save	Moritz; 38% to save	Saray; 45.6% to save	Leo; 44.6% to save	Daniel; 49.3% to win
Eliminated	Clartizell; 23% to save	Encarna; 47% to save	Xavier; 48% to save	José Antonio; 47% to save	Cristina; 42% to save	Mercedes; 46% to save	Mayte; 42% to save	Vanessa; 26% to save	Eva; 46% to save	Jorge; 49.5% to save	Ismael; 44% to save	Eliminated Finalist	José; 22% to save	Moritz; 38% to save	Saray; 45.6% to save	Leo; 44.6% to save	Daniel; 49.3% to win
Eliminated	Melissa; 9% to save	Encarna; 47% to save	Xavier; 48% to save	José Antonio; 47% to save	Cristina; 42% to save	Mercedes; 46% to save	Mayte; 42% to save	Vanessa; 26% to save	Eva; 46% to save	Jorge; 49.5% to save	Ismael; 44% to save	Eliminated Finalist	José; 22% to save	Moritz; 38% to save	Saray; 45.6% to save	Leo; 44.6% to save	Daniel; 49.3% to win

=== Gala 0 (October 8, 2006) ===
Songs:

- Claritzel – "If ain't go you", Alicia Keys
- Ismael – "Volverá", El Canto del Loco
- Eva – "La vida es bella", Noa
- Leo – "Devuélveme a mi chica", Hombres G
- Vanessa – "Más que nada", Sérgio Mendes
- Moritz – "Don't Let the Sun Go Down on Me", Elton John
- Mayte – "Voy a vivir", Gloria Gaynor
- Daniel – "Suspicious Minds", Elvis Presley
- Cristina – "Dulce locura", La Oreja de Van Gogh
- Jorge – "Historia de un amor", Bolero
- Mercedes – "Guerra fría", Pastora Soler
- José – "La ciudad perdida", David DeMaría
- Melissa – "Baila Casanova", Paulina Rubio
- Saray – "Bad Girls", Donna Summer
- Xavier – "Mi historia entre tus dedos", Sergio Dalma
- Encarna – "Tal para cual", Luz Casal
- José Antonio – "Para ti sería", Nek
- Lorena – "I Surrender", Celine Dion

Results:

- Nominated: José, Xavier, Melissa and Claritzel
- Saved: José (41%), Xavier (27%)
- Expulsed: Claritzel (23%), Melissa (9%)

=== Gala 1 (October 15, 2006) ===
Songs:

- Moritz and Saray – "One", U2 and Mary J. Blige.
- Vanessa and Mayte – "Lo echamos a suertes", Ella baila sola.
- Daniel and Eva – "Otra vez", Coti and Paulina Rubio.
- Lorena and Encarna – "The Reason", Celine Dion.
- José and José Antonio – "Todo", Pereza.
- Ismael and Leo – "Dime que me quieres", Tequila.
- Mercedes and Xavier – "No me crees", Javier Ojeda and Efecto Mariposa.
- Jorge and Cristina – "Déjame verte", Diego Martín and Raquel del Rosario.

Results:

- Favorites: Lorena, Jorge, Saray, Jose
- Favorite: Saray
- Nominated: Cristina, Mercedes, Encarna and Xavier
- Saved by teachers: Cristina
- Saved by participants: Mercedes (7 votes), Encarna (3 votes), Xavier (3 votes)
- Nominated: Encarna and Xavier

=== Gala 2 (October 22, 2006) ===
Songs:

- Xavier – "Como todos", Nino Bravo.
- Encarna – "She Works Hard for the Money", Donna Summer.
- Mayte and José – "Tu corazón", Lena and Alejandro Sanz.
- Saray, Lorena and Mercedes – "Jumpin' Jack Flash", The Rolling Stones.
- Ismael and Moritz – "La casa por el tejado", Fito y los Fitipaldis.
- Jorge and Eva – "Burbujas de amor", Juan Luis Guerra.
- Vanessa and Cristina – "Será, será", Shakira.
- Leo, Daniel and José Antonio – "I'm a Believer", The Monkees.

Results:

- Saved: Xavier (53%)
- Expulsed: Encarna (47%)
- Favorites: Saray, Lorena, Jorge, Leo
- Favorite: Saray
- Nominated: Cristina, José, Moritz, Xavier
- Saved by teachers: Moritz
- Saved by participants: Cristina (7 votes), Xavier (4 votes), José (1 vote)
- Nominated: José and Xavier

=== Gala 3 (October 29, 2006) ===
Songs:

- José – "Ángel", Jon Secada.
- Xavier – "It's Not Unusual", Tom Jones.
- Daniel – "Everlasting Love", Smokey Robinson.
- Lorena – "La gata bajo la lluvia", Rocío Dúrcal.
- Saray and Mayte – "Tu peor error", La Quinta Estación.
- Ismael and Vanessa – "What you're made of", Lucie Silvas and Antonio Orozco.
- Moritz and Leo – "My Sharona", The Knack.
- Mercedes, Eva and Cristina – "Los amantes", Ana Torroja.
- Jorge and José Antonio – "Dame", Luis Miguel.

Results:

- Saved: José (52%)
- Expulsed: Xavier (48%)
- Favorites: Jorge, Lorena, Saray, Leo
- Favorite: Saray
- Nominated: Jorge, Mercedes, Mayte, José Antonio
- Saved by teachers: Mercedes
- Saved by participants: Jorge (4 votes), José Antonio (4 votes), Mayte (3 votes)
- Nominated: Mayte and José Antonio

=== Gala 4 (November 5, 2006) ===
Songs:

- José Antonio – "It's My Life", Bon Jovi.
- Mayte – "Eras tú", Merche.
- Leo – "Temblando", Hombres G.
- Saray – "Goldfinger", Shirley Bassey.
- Jorge and Mercedes – "Frío sin ti", Navajita Plateá.
- José, Daniel and Moritz – "Celebration", Kool & The Gang.
- Cristina and Ismael – "Usted abusó", Maria Creuza.
- Vanessa, Lorena and Eva – "Holding Out for a Hero", Bonnie Tyler.

Results:

- Saved: Mayte (53%)
- Expulsed: José Antonio (47%)
- Favorites: Saray, Leo, Jorge, Lorena
- Favorite: Jorge
- Nominated: Ismael, Cristina, Eva, Leo
- Saved by teachers: Ismael
- Saved by participants: Eva (5 votes), Cristina (3 votes), Leo (2 votes)
- Nominated: Cristina y Leo

=== Gala 5 (November 12, 2006) ===
Songs:

- Cristina – "Esta soy yo", El Sueño de Morfeo.
- Leo – "Besos" El Canto del Loco.
- Lorena – "If You Don't Know Me by Now" Harold Melvin & the Blue Notes.
- Daniel and Saray – "Endless Love" Diana Ross & Lionel Richie.
- Mercedes and José – "Cómo pudiste hacerme esto a mí" Alaska y Dinarama.
- Ismael and Moritz – "La vida empieza hoy" Sergio Dalma.
- Eva and Mayte – "Teresa" Pasión Vega.
- Jorge – "Tu nombre me sabe a hierba" Joan Manuel Serrat.
- Vanessa – "Hot Stuff" Donna Summer.

Results:

- Saved: Leo (58%)
- Expulsed: Cristina (42%)
- Favorites: Jorge, Lorena, Saray, Ismael
- Favorite: Saray
- Nominated: Mercedes, Vanessa, Mayte, Eva
- Saved by teachers: Vanessa
- Saved by participants: Eva (5 votes), Mercedes (4 votes), Mayte (0 votes)
- Nominated: Mayte and Mercedes

=== Gala 6 (November 19, 2006) ===
Songs:

- Mayte –"Va todo al ganador", ABBA.
- Mercedes –" Flor de romero", Pastora Soler
- Leo and Vanessa – "Resurrección", Amaral
- Lorena and Jorge – "No", Armando Manzanero
- Daniel and Eva – "True Love", Elton John & Kiki Dee
- Ismael – "Sunday Morning", Maroon 5
- Moritz and José – "You Can't Hurry Love", Phil Collins
- Saray – "Te conozco desde siempre", Malú

Results:

- Saved: Mayte (54%)
- Expulsed: Mercedes (46%)
- Favorites: Leo, Saray, Jorge, Lorena
- Favorite: Lorena
- Nominated: Eva, Moritz, José, Mayte
- Saved by teachers: José
- Saved by participants: Eva (5 votes), Mayte (2 votes), Moritz (1 vote)
- Nominated: Mayte and Moritz

=== Gala 7 (November 26, 2006) ===
Songs:

- Mayte – "Profundo valor", Marta Sánchez
- Moritz – "Las malas lenguas", Santiago Auserón
- Lorena and Vanessa – "Queen of the Night", Whitney Houston
- Leo – "Cien Gaviotas", Duncan Dhu
- Eva – "Como hemos cambiado", Presuntos Implicados
- Jorge and Daniel – "Cuando nadie me ve", Alejandro Sanz
- Saray and Ismael – "What Now My Love", Frank Sinatra
- José – "Wake Me Up Before You Go-Go", Wham!

Results:

- Saved: Moritz (58%)
- Expulsed: Mayte (42%)
- Favorites: Lorena, Jorge, Leo, Saray
- Favorite: Jorge
- Nominated: Vanessa, Daniel, Eva, José
- Saved by teachers: Daniel
- Saved by participants: Eva (4 votes), Vanessa (3 votes), José (0 votes)
- Nominated: José and Vanessa

=== Gala 8 (December 3, 2006) ===
Songs:

- Vanessa – "Cançao do mar", Dulce Pontes
- José – "Quisiera poder olvidarme de ti", Luis Fonsi
- Saray and Lorena – "You Shook Me All Night Long", Anastacia and Celine Dion
- Jorge – "Vente pa' Madrid", Ketama
- Eva – "Hijo de la luna", Mecano
- Moritz and Leo – "Back in the USSR", The Beatles
- Daniel – "Blue Velvet", Bobby Vinton
- Ismael – "Atrévete", Cristian Castro

Results:

- Saved: Jose (74%)
- Expulsed: Vanessa (26%)
- Favorites: Jorge, Daniel, Saray, Leo
- Favorite: Saray
- Nominated: Ismael, Eva, Jorge, José
- Saved by teachers: Ismael
- Saved by participants: José (3 votes), Jorge (2 votes), Eva (1 vote)
- Nominated: Eva and Jorge

=== Gala 9 (December 10, 2006) ===
Songs:

- Eva – "Lela", Rosendo Mato Hermida
- Jorge – "Dormir Contigo", Luis Miguel
- Moritz – "Satisfaction", The Rolling Stones
- Daniel – "Always on My Mind", Elvis Presley
- Ismael – "Welcome to My Life", Simple Plan
- Lorena – "Empiezo a recordarte", Mónica Naranjo
- José – "Vuelve el amor", La Unión
- Leo – "Loco", Andrés Calamaro

Results:

- Saved: Jorge (54%)
- Expulsed: Eva (46%)
- Favorites: Leo, Lorena, Daniel, Saray
- Favorite: Saray
- Nominated: Jorge, José, Lorena, Leo
- Saved by teachers: Lorena
- Saved by participants: José (4 votes), Leo (1 vote), Jorge (0 votes)
- Nominated: Jorge y Leo

=== Gala 10 (December 17, 2006) ===
Songs:

- Leo – "El mundo tras el cristal", La Guardia
- Jorge – "Con sólo una sonrisa", Melendi
- José – "Tren de largo recorrido", La Unión
- Daniel – "Unchained Melody", Richard Clayderman & James Last
- Saray – "Stuff like that there", Bette Midler
- Ismael – "La noche me resbala", Señor Trepador
- Lorena – "Como yo te amo", Rocío Jurado
- Moritz – "Live and Let Die", Paul McCartney & Wings

Results:

- Saved: Leo (50.5%)
- Expulsed: Jorge (49.5%)
- Favorite: Daniel
- 3 more voted by jury: 1st Daniel (29.0 points), 2nd Saray (28.5 points), 3rd Lorena (26.0 points)
- 4 less voted by jury: 4th Moritz (23.5 points), 5th Leo (20.5 points) 6th Ismael (20.0 points), 7th José (18.0 points)
- elected by teachers: Moritz
- elected by participants: Leo (2 votes), José (2 votes), Ismael (0 votes)
- Nominated: Ismael and José

=== Gala 11 (December 28, 2006) ===
Songs:

- Ismael – "Te extraño", Armando Manzanero
- José – "Rock with You", Michael Jackson
- Saray – "Grande, grande, grande", Mina
- Lorena – "Land of a Thousand Dances", Wilson Pickett
- Daniel – "Volverte a ver", Dyango
- Leo – "Milonga del marinero y el capitán", Los Rodríguez
- Moritz – "Stuck in the Middle with You", Stealers Wheel

Results:

- Saved: José (56%)
- Expulsed: Ismael (44%)
- Favorite by jury: Lorena

=== Gala 12 (January 4, 2007) ===
Songs:

- Saray – "Gloria", Laura Branigan
- Lorena – "Call Me", Blondie
- Daniel – "The Great Pretender", Freddie Mercury // "Unchained Melody", The Righteous Brothers
- Moritz – "Purple Rain", Prince
- Leo – "El ritmo del garaje", Loquillo y los Trogloditas
- José – "Veneno en la piel", Radio Futura // "Ángel", Jon Secada

Results:

- Favorite by jury: Moritz
- Most voted: Lorena, Moritz, Saray, Leo (22.1%, 19.5%, 17.6%, 15.1%)
- Duel: José and Dani (11.9%, 13.8%)
- Won the duel: Daniel (78%)
- Expulsed: José (22%)

=== Gala 13 (January 11, 2007) ===
Songs:

- Daniel – "Your Song", Elton John
- Leo – "Ojos de gata", Enrique Urquijo
- Lorena – "Héroe", Mariah Carey // "Cómo yo te amo", Rocío Jurado
- Moritz – "We Will Rock You", Queen // "Las malas lenguas", Santiago y Luis Auserón
- Saray – "Respect", Aretha Franklin

Results:

- Favorite by jury: Daniel
- Most voted: Daniel, Saray, Leo (28%, 25%, 19%)
- Duel: Moritz and Lorena (12%, 16%)
- Won the duel: Lorena (62%)
- Expulsed: Moritz (38%)

=== Gala 14 (January 18, 2007) ===
Songs:

- Leo – "Mediterraneo", Los Rebeldes // "El mundo tras el cristal", La Guardia
- Lorena – "Se nos rompió el amor", Rocío Jurado
- Saray – "Mack the Knife", Ella Fitzgerald // "Quiero cantar", Rosario
- Daniel – "Contigo aprendí", Armando Manzanero
- Daniel y Leo – "Diana", Paul Anka
- Lorena y Saray – "Tell Him", Celine Dion and Barbra Streisand

Results:

- Favorite by jury: Lorena and Saray
- Most voted: Daniel and Lorena (33.5%, 26.3%)
- Duel: Saray and Leo (19.6%, 20.6%)
- Won the duel: Leo (54.4%)
- Expulsed: Saray (45.6%)

=== Gala 15 (January 25, 2007) ===
Finalists: Leo.Lorena.Daniel Songs:

- Leo – "Oigo Música", M-Clan // "Besos", El Canto del Loco
- Lorena – "I Feel Good", James Brown
- Daniel – "Me and Mrs. Jones", Billy Paul // "Blue Belvet, Bobby Vinton

Results:

- Favorite by jury: Lorena
- Most voted: Lorena
- Duel: Daniel and Leo
- Won the duel: Daniel (55.4%)
- 3rd Position: Leo (44.6%)

=== Gala 16 (January 26, 2007) ===
Songs:

- Lorena – "Summertime", George Gershwin // "Land of a Thousand Dances", Wilson Pickett
- Daniel – "Overjoyed", Stevie Wonder // "Your Song", Elton John

Results:

- Winner: Lorena (50.7%)
- 2nd Position: Daniel (49.3%)
