= No Quiero Enamorarme =

"No Quiero Enamorarme" (I Don't Want to Fall in Love) was the first single by Daniel Zueras, released on April 16, 2007. The video of the song had a large impact among the public because of its explicit sexual content (it features a threesome between Dani, a woman, and another man). The single made #5 in the charts in its first week of release in Spain.

In response to Internet rumors about Zueras and the other man in the video, Zueras suggested that viewers shouldn't draw conclusions about a performer's private life from a video.

Although the song's video displays only kisses and body touching, YouTube users flagged the video after its release, restricting access to it. Zueras disagreed with the censorship of his video, citing the availability of more offensive and violent videos, and saying his video was not excessive.
