= Lorena Gómez =

Spanish singer (born 1986)

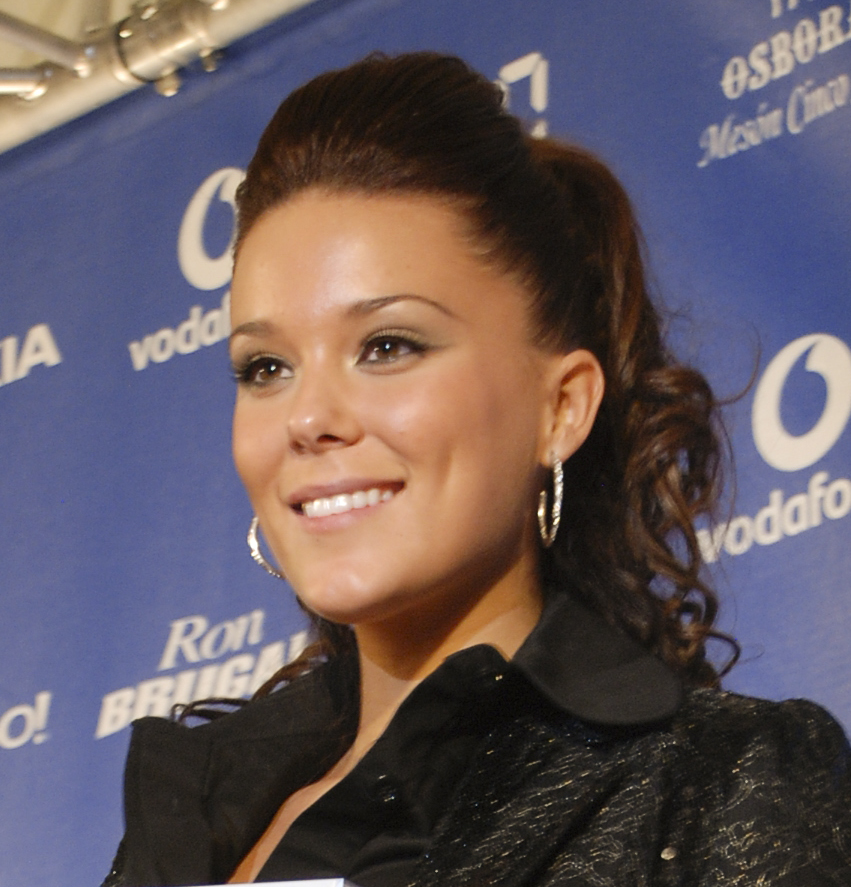
- Lorena Gómez in 2007

Background information
- Born: Lorena Gómez Pérez; 12 April 1986 (age 40); Lleida, Spain
- Genres: Pop
- Occupation: Singer
- Years active: 2006–present
- Label: Sony BMG
- Website: Official website

Lorena Gómez Pérez (born 12 April 1986 in Lleida), known artistically as Lorena Gómez, is a Spanish singer.

She was the winner of TV's Spanish language's talent-search program fifth series of Operación Triunfo. In 2007, her debut album, Lorena was released under the Sony BMG label.

== Biography ==
=== Early years ===
She was born on 12 April 1986 in Lleida, Spain. She is the youngest daughter of Paco (police) and Mari (homemaker). She has two older sisters, Sonia and Gemma.

At age 8 performed in a stage for the first time and she never went down of it. For 14 years she was at the Casa de Andalucía of Lleida singing and dancing flamenco, sang in various benefit acts (always as a solo singer) and was component of a gospel choir where she studied vocal training.

In television, Operación Triunfo wasn't her first appearance, she was at age 10 in Menudas Estrellas and Menudo Show, at age 12 in Sabor a ti and at age 16 in Cerca de ti.

She also taken part in different singing competitions: in 2001 was finalist of the Benidorm Song Festival, in 2003 won Operación Tremp and in 2004 was second in the Concurso Nacional de Coplas.

=== Operación Triunfo 2006 ===
This program started on 8 October 2006 and, for four months, she was shut in an academy with an adjusted timetable of classes and rehearsals.

In the first part of the program, the show's favorite was chosen by the public, and the jury nominated to leave the academy. In this part, she was, every week, except one, between the four most voted by the public, and was the favorite in the gala (episode) 6. She was nominated by the jury one time, in the gala 9, but she was saved by the teachers.

In the second part of the program, the favorite was chosen by the jury, and the two less voted by the public fought a duel to not leave the academy. During this part, she was elected favorite by the jury 3 times, in the galas 11, 14 and 15. She fought a duel with Moritz in the gala 13 and was saved by the public with 62% of the votes.

In the final gala 16, on 26 January 2007, she was chosen winner of the program with a 50.7% of the votes of the public in front of her top rival, Daniel. For winning the 5th season of the show, Lorena got a record contract with the multinational Sony BMG "label".

=== Post Show – Debut album (2007): Lorena ===
Once finished the program, and after made the required interviews in television and press as winner of Operación Triunfo, she started the recording of her first album in Sony BMG. The recording of this album was made between February and March 2007 in the Estudios Filigrana at Córdoba, under the direction and production of Manuel Ruiz "Queco".

On 27 March 2007, two months after winning Operación Triunfo, this album, named Lorena was released, the album was an album of personal covers of greatest hits of international artists, with two new songs also included. The album entered and peaked at number 4 of the Spanish Top 100 Albums.

Two singles were released from the album: "Sin Medida" in March 2007 and "Otro Amor Vendrá" in July 2007. Lorena promoted these singles in television, radio and press (National and Autonomic); also she was invited to perform in several galas and events (as the Cup's Soccer Final in the Santiago Bernabeu Stadium or the Europride 2007 between others); and she appeared in the TV Series more viewed in Spain: Yo soy Bea.

She started the tour Adelante on 24 March 2007 with her mates in Operación Triunfo 2006. In this tour they performed songs of the TV program and their first single of their albums. The tour was composed of 11 concerts in big precincts in Lleida, Santander, Zaragoza, Madrid, Barcelona, València, Murcia, Fuerteventura, Málaga and Bilbao. The tour finished on 26 May 2007 in Bilbao.

In the summer of 2007 she made a mini-tour presenting the songs of her debut album. The tour started on 16 June 2007 in Lleida as supporting artist of David Bisbal. The tour was composed of 10 concerts in the provinces of Lleida, Lugo, Murcia, Málaga, Asturias, Barcelona, Madrid and Huesca. The tour finished on 12 October 2007 in Fraga (Huesca).

=== 2008 – Second-album: De Pelicula ===
The lead off single is Maniac, which failed to make any impact on the charts, due to the low promotion given on radios and TV shows.

The album was released on 1 April 2008 in Spain, and peaked at a very disappointing #34 on the Spanish Albums Chart, due to the low promotion and the album is another cover-release. The album fell to #57 the following week, rising to #46 the fourth week.

=== 2010 – Eurovision ===
Lorena competed in the pre-selection of the Spanish entry to the 2010 Eurovision Song Contest with her song, "Amor Magico" (Magical Love). She received the second-highest number of votes in the online voting poll and was put through to the final 10 'liveshows' Spain in the Eurovision Song Contest 2010. Lorena's song "Amor Magico" went on to finish in third place behind strong favorites "En Una Vida" by (Coral Segovia) and eventual winning song "Algo Pequenito" by (Daniel Diges).

=== 2013–present (Career in Acting / third studio album) ===
Lorena flew to the States to begin work on her acting career and her highly anticipated third studio album. The new record "Esta Vez" will consist a full set of original compositions. The first single of the same name "Esta Vez" was released in 2013. The promo-only non-official second single "Bailar" was released in February 2015.

== Filmography ==
=== Acting roles ===
Television
Year	Title	Role	Notes
2007	Yo soy Bea	Herself	"Álvaro quiere forzar la dimisión de Nacho" (Season 2, Episode 152)
2013	El rostro de la venganza	Sandra Arriagada	Recurring role
2013	Marido en alquiler	Gypsy	
2014	Reina de corazones	Mujer criminal	
2015	Voltea pa' que te enamores	Arantza	Recurring role

=== Voice acting ===
Film
Year	Title	Role	Publisher	Notes	Ref.
2023	Wish	Amaya	Spain's Spanish dub	Songs	
2024	Mufasa: The Lion King	Afia	Spain's Spanish dub	Songs	

== Discography ==
=== Albums ===
Year	Title	Charts		Sales/certifications
Year	Title	SPA	EUR	Sales/certifications
2007	Lorena: Published: 27 March 2007 (SPA)	4	60	Sales: 70,000+ Certification: Gold
2008	De Pelicula: Published: 1 April 2008 (SPA)	34	—	Sales: 28,000+ Certification: —
2023	Me vuelvo a la vida: Published: 27 October 2023 (SPA)			Sales: Certification: —

=== Singles ===
Year	Title	Album
2007	"Sin Medida" [Winner's single]: Released: March 2007	Lorena
2007	"Otro Amor Vendrá": Released: July 2007	Lorena
2008	"Maniac": Released: March 2008	De Pelicula
2008	"I Don't Want To Miss A Thing": Released: July 2008	De Pelicula
2010	"Amor Magico": Released: Spring 2010	Tba
2011	"Ets La Millor": Released: Summer 2011	Tba
2013	"Esta Vez": Released: 2013	
2017	Indomable	
2017	Vulnerable a ti	
2018	Bórrame el recuerdo	
2022	Me vuelvo a la vida	Me vuelvo a la vida
2023	Ojo de Halcón	Me vuelvo a la vida
2023	Cara Bonita	Me vuelvo a la vida
2023	El peón y la reina	Me vuelvo a la vida
2023	20 de septiembre	Me vuelvo a la vida
2024	Ganas tu	Me vuelvo a la vida
2024	Vives en mi	Me vuelvo a la vida
2024	Que te vaya bonito	Me vuelvo a la vida

=== Collaborations ===
Year	Album	Artist	Song(s)
2006	Contigo: Published: November 2006	Sergio Rivero	"Como Eres"
2006	Adelante: Published: December 2006	Operación Triunfo 2006	"Conmigo No Se Juega"; "All Of Me To You"; "Nada más en mi Corazón"; "Como Eres"
2007	Iniciando Sesion: Published: April 2007	Leo	"Se Escapan Mis Razones"
2009	Los mejores años de nuestra vida	Los mejores años 2009	"Corazón ontento"; "I will survive"; "YMCA"; "A quien le importa"; "Aire"; "Aqua Barbie Girl"; "Wannabe"; "Los mejores años"
2009	El disc de La Marató	TV3	"Ets la Millor"
2010	Destino Oslo	TVE	"Amor Mágico"
2010	Se llama copla	Canal Sur	"Aquella Carmen"; "Esclava de tu amor"; "Callejuela sin salida"
2010	Qué tiempo tan feliz	Telecinco	"Aquella noche"; "Juntos"; "Amor, amor"; "Como yo te amo"; "Amigo amor"; "Castillos en el aire"; "Azul"; "Celebration"; "Cara dura"; "El vals de las Mariposas"; "Alegría"; "Americanos"
2010	Ahora 011	Blanco y Negro	"Get it up"
2023	BSO de Wish: el poder de los deseos	Disney	"Esa es la verdad"
2024	Iguales y diferentes	Gente de Zona	"Iguales y diferentes"
