= José Galisteo =

Spanish singer

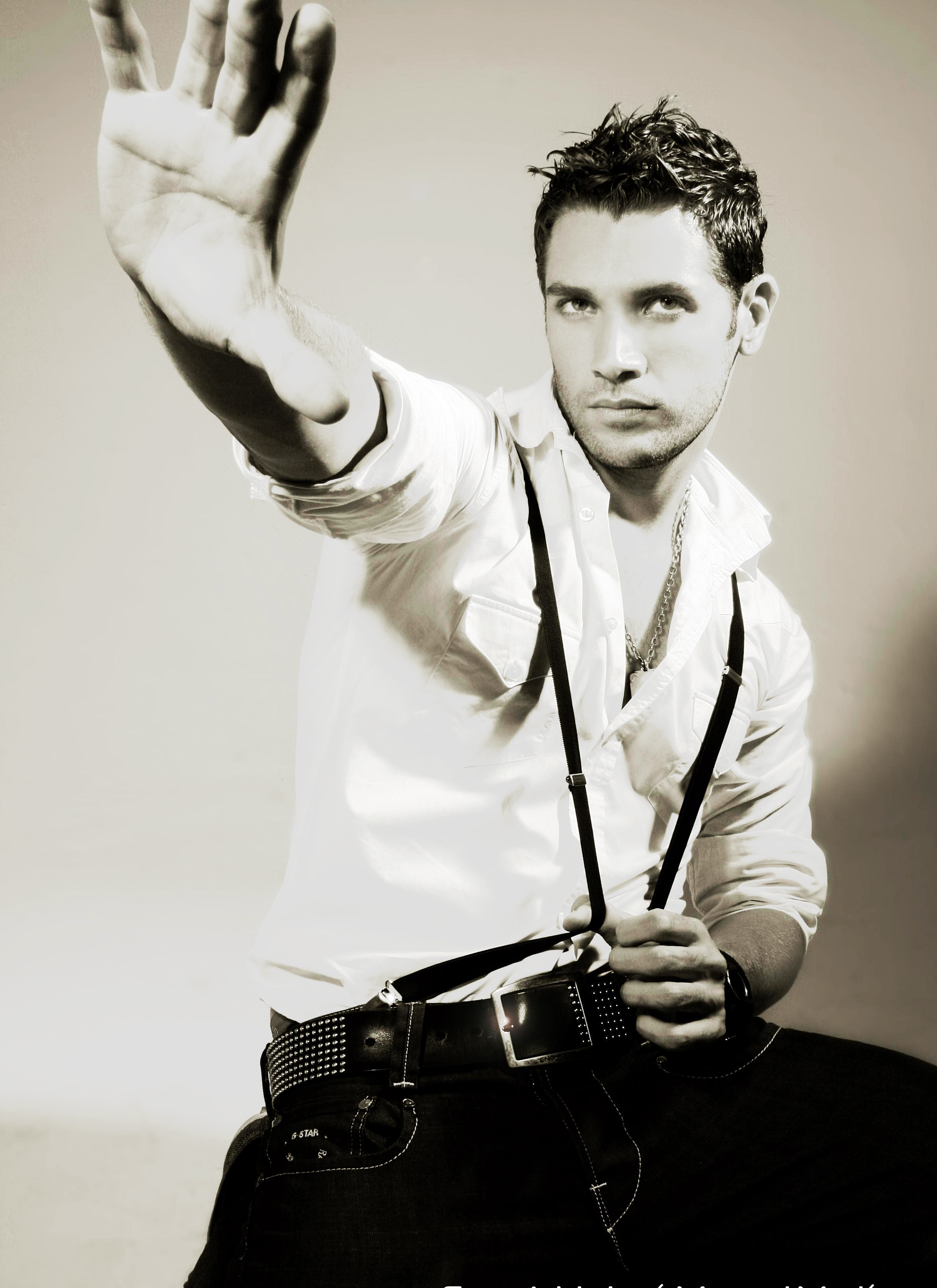

Background information
- Born: José Antonio Galisteo García; 24 February 1977 (age 49); Viladecans (Barcelona), Spain
- Genres: Pop; dance-pop
- Occupations: Singer; musician; actor
- Years active: Since 2006
- Labels: Label Sound Records; Goal Songs
- Website: Official website

José Antonio Galisteo García (born 24 February 1977 in Viladecans, Barcelona, Spain) is a Spanish singer. He was a contestant in the fifth season of the Spanish reality television series Operación Triunfo, where he placed finalist. He has since gone on to record a 2007 best-selling disc, Remember and a follow-up album in 2009 called Luces y Sombras, Wish (2013) and "I Believe in You" (2014)

== Biography ==
Jose Galisteo, the second of three children in a working-class family, was passionate about music from an early age, began music studies at ten years old.

After completing his education in Viladecans Secondary school, Galisteo joined the military. After that he moved to Barcelona and worked as a vocalist in local acts and clubs for many years, before applying in May 2006 for the successful TV programme Operación Triunfo where he finished 6th.

In May 2007 he released his first album Remember containing 1980s and 1990s hit covers in English. Produced by the Spanish producers DaBruk and released on the record label Vale Music/Universal he released two singles, Promised Myself and Big in Japan. In 2008 he obtained the Garamond Prize for the best dance production album, in Madrid.

During the 2008 tour José Galisteo sang in more than one hundred Spanish cities and also some European cities like Lyon, Paris or Bern.

In November 2009 he launched his second studio album Luces y Sombras produced by DaBruk, Andreas Rickstrand (Sweden), Tony Sanchez-Ohlsson, and Kareem Junior (French DJ and producer), including 13 electro-pop songs and 3 remixes. The first single was Lógicamente No.

On 22 February 2010 he took part in the Spanish preselection to the Eurovision Song Contest Destino Oslo, La Gala de Eurovisión 2010 with the song Beautiful Life and finished 4th of the audience vote.

In April 2010 he launched the maxi single Beautiful Life with five tracks including some house remixes. The videoclip got 30.000 downloads in YouTube in 48 hours. The maxi single remained at TOP 5 iTunes for some weeks.

In November 2010 he launched the maxi single Mis Trampas with anvideoclip that got 20.000 downloads in 24 hours.

During the 2011 tour José Galisteo sang in some European cities like Helsinki and Bern, and his music began playing in some South America radio stations.

On 29 April 2013 he launched the single Wish, produced by himself in all digital platforms, placing TOP 5 iTunes.

On 11 September 2014 he launched the single and videoclip (with his sister as actress) I Believe in You, composed and produced by himself, placing TOP 10 iTunes for some days.

For the years 2015 and 2016 was the lead singer of the famous orchest “Expresiones Orquesta”

Actually Jose Galisteo has his own events and djs company “Barcelona Deejays”.

== Discography ==
=== Albums ===
- 2007: Remember (Vale Music/Universal)
1. What is Love (Haddaway cover)
2. Relight My Fire (A duo with Saray)
3. I Promised Myself (Nick Kamen cover)
4. Big in Japan (Alphaville cover)
5. Please Don't Go (KC and the Sunshine Band cover)
6. Running in the Family (Level 42 cover)
7. Enola Gay (Orchestral Manoeuvres in the Dark cover)
8. Torture (The Jacksons cover)
9. Together Forever (Rick Astley cover)
10. Don't Leave Me This Way (The Communards cover)
- 2009: Luces y Sombras (Label Sound records)
1. Lógicamente No
2. Luces y Sombras
3. Recordándote
4. No Vuelvas
5. Beautiful Life
6. Déjame
7. Stop
8. Intento de Dos
9. Mis Trampas
10. Ahora
11. Lógicamente No (Dabruk tonic Remix)
12. No Vuelvas (Tearhouse Dabruk Remix)
13. Luces y Sombras (Kareem Junior Remix)
- 2013: Wish (Goal Songs)
- 2013: I Believe in You (La Cupula Music)

=== Singles ===
- 2007: "I Promised Myself"
- 2007: "What Is Love"
- 2008: "Big in Japan"
- 2009: "Lógicamente No"
- 2010: "Beautiful Life"
- 2011: "Mis trampas"
- 2013: "Wish"
- 2014: "I Believe in You"
- 2014: "Jo Crec en Tu"

=== Videoclips ===
- 2007: "I Promised Myself" (dir. Rita Clip!) Vale Music/Universal
- 2008: "Big in Japan" (dir. Karim Benham) Vale Music/Universal
- 2009: "Lógicamente no" (dir. Karim Benham) Label Sound Records
- 2010: "Beautiful Life" (dir. Karim Benham) Label Sound Records
- 2011: "Mis trampas" (dir. Karim Benham/Albert Salas) Label Sound Records
- 2014: "I Believe in You" (dir. Karim Benham) Galisteo Music
- 2014: "Jo crec en Tu" (dir. Karim Benham) Galisteo Music
