= La Unión (band) =

Spanish new wave band

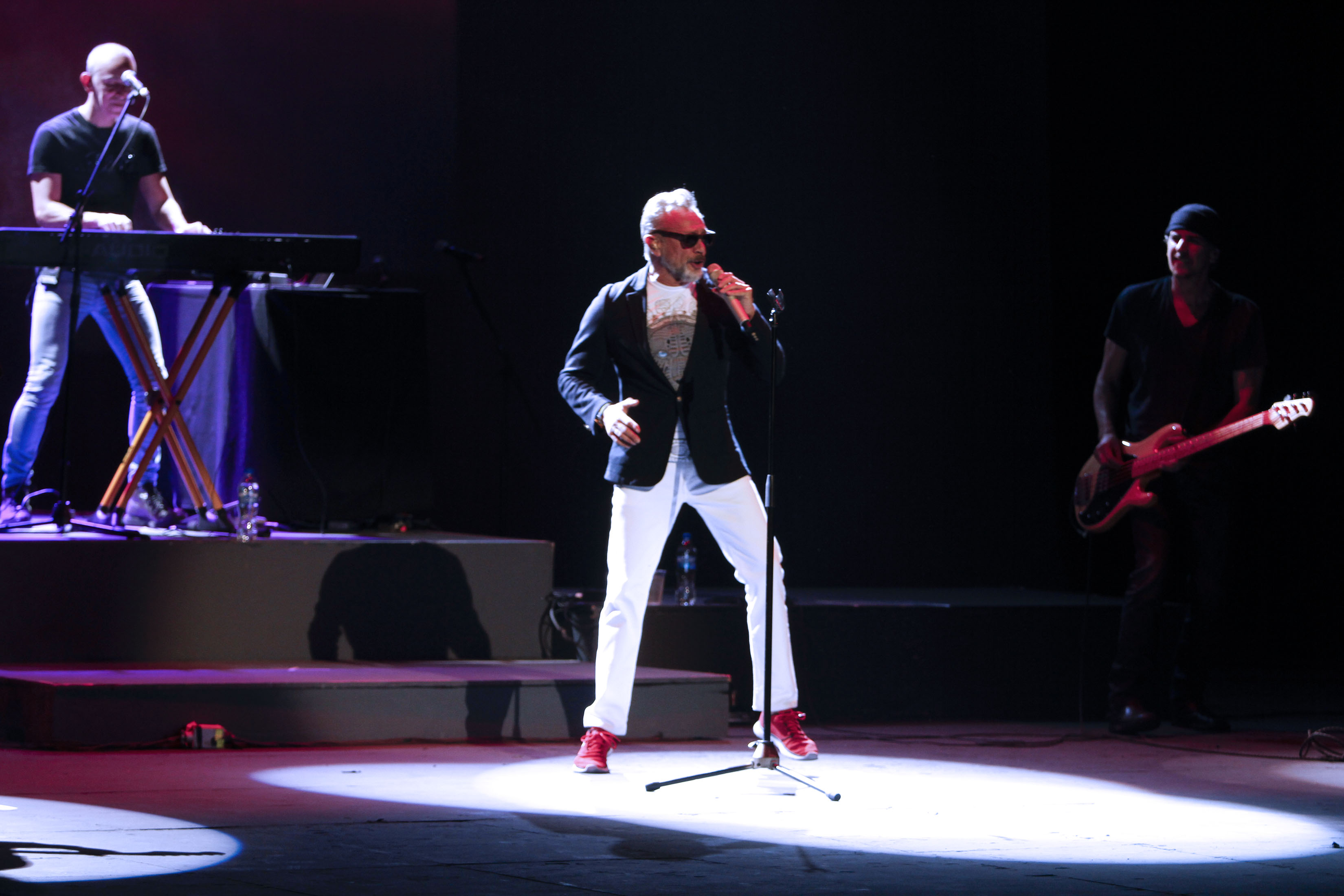
- La Unión on tour in Mexico City in 2015

Background information
- Origin: Madrid, Spain
- Genres: Electronic; electro pop; new wave; rock en español; synth-pop
- Years active: 1982–2020
- Labels: WEA; Universal Music Spain
- Past members: Luis Bolín; Rafa Sánchez; Íñigo Zabala; Mario Martínez
- Website: www.launion.net

La Unión (sometimes styled as La Uniøn) was a Spanish new wave band formed in 1982 by lead vocalist Rafa Sánchez, guitarist Mario Martínez, bassist Luis Bolín, and keyboardist Íñigo Zabala. They are best known for their 1984 hit "Lobo Hombre en París". The band officially dissolved in May 2020. This was announced by lead singer Rafa Sanchez, although the band officially stopped live performances in 2015. The band's dissolution was solidified by the death of co-founder Mario Martinez.

== Band members ==
- Rafa Sánchez – lead vocals (1983–2020)
- Luis Bolín – lead vocals, bass guitar (1982–2020)
- Íñigo Zabala – keyboards (1982–1988)
- Mario Martínez – guitars (1982–2015; died 2022)

=== Other members ===
- Rex Caravello – guitars
- Alejo Roldán – bass guitar
- Mario Castelán – drums, percussion

== Discography ==
- Mil siluetas (1984)
- El maldito viento (1985)
- 4×4 (1987)
- Vivir al este del Edén (1988)
- Tentación (1990)
- Tren de largo recorrido (1992)
- Psychofunkster au lait (1993)
- Los maxis (1993)
- Conmemorativo 1984–1994 (1994)
- Hiperespacio (1996)
- Fluye (1997)
- La Unión (1999)
- Grandes éxitos (Recopilatorio) (2000)
- El mar de la fertilidad (2002)
- Colección audiovisual 1984–2004 (Recopilatorio) (2004)
- Love Sessions (Recopilatorio electrónico) (2006)
- Big Bang (2010)
- Hip.gnosis (2013)
- Grandes Éxitos by Hip.Gnosis (2013)
- Hip.gnosis Best of Vol.2 (2015)
- Todo Éxitos (2015)
- No Estamos Solos En Concierto (2017)
