= Vanessa González (singer) =

Costa Rican singer-songwriter (born 1983)

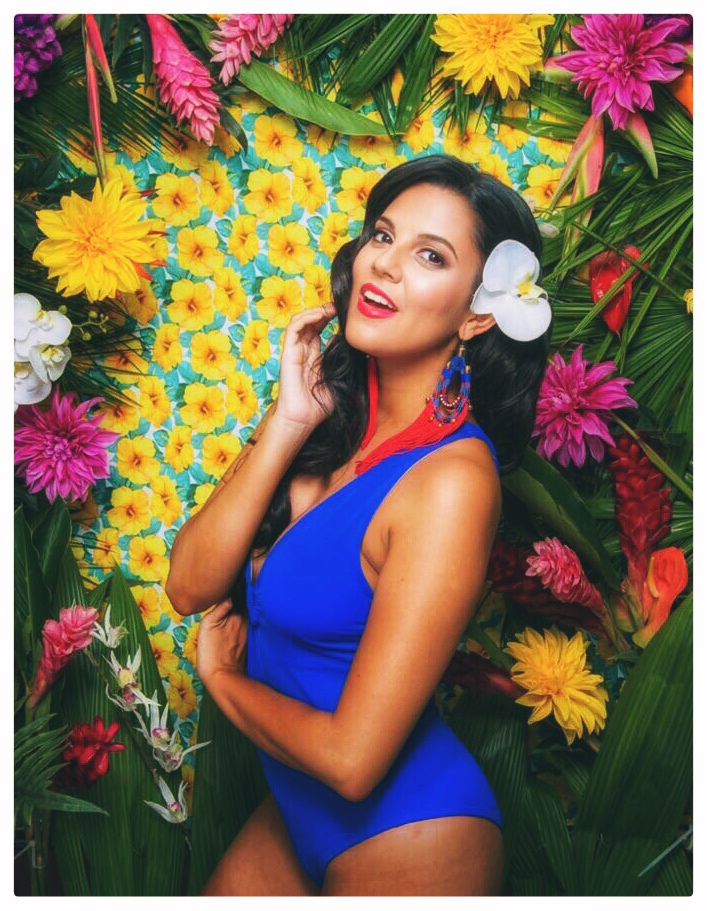
- González in 2018
- Born: Vanessa González Leal; 21 November 1983 (age 42); San José, Costa Rica
- Education: Architecture, University of Costa Rica
- Occupations: Singer-songwriter actress
- Years active: 2010–present
- Musical career
- Genres: Pop; Ballad; Pop rock; Urban
- Instruments: Vocals, guitar, violin

Vanessa González Leal (born 21 November 1983) is a Costa Rican singer-songwriter and actress. She gained national recognition after representing Costa Rica in the second season of Latin American Idol. Since 2010, she has pursued a solo career with multiple hit singles such as "Olvidarme de Ti" and "No Miro Atrás," and has performed as a guest artist in concerts with Ricardo Montaner, Yuri, Pandora, and others.

== Early life and education ==
González was born in San José, Costa Rica. Her parents, Jorge González Cordero and Iriabelle Leal Arrieta, met in a university choir, fostering Vanessa's early interest in music. She began singing at age three and made her television debut at four on the children's show Recreo Grande. She studied music at the University of Costa Rica from a young age, focusing on violin and guitar, and participated in school and church choirs, including the Angelus choir for over a decade. Vanessa later earned a degree in architecture from the University of Costa Rica before fully dedicating herself to music.

== Career ==
In 2007, González represented Costa Rica on Latin American Idol during its second season. Although she did not reach the final round, the experience gave her national exposure. She went on to collaborate with Costa Rican acts such as Porpartes, Escats, and Arnoldo Castillo.

In 2013, she debuted as a solo artist with the single "Olvidarme de Ti," which topped Costa Rican radio charts. This was followed by "No Miro Atrás" (2014), a pop-rock single that aired on Ritmoson Latino. In 2015, she composed and performed "A Tu Lado," the theme song for Costa Rica's first telenovela, La María.

She continued to evolve musically with the ballad-pop single "No iré corriendo" (2016) and, in 2017, ventured into urban and calypso fusion with "Rumba en mi piel," highlighting Costa Rican Caribbean rhythms. In 2019, she released "Decide por favor," a track centered on themes of empowerment and overcoming toxic relationships. In 2020, she wrote "Santa ya llegó," the theme song for the Costa Rican Christmas movie Mi papá es un Santa.

González gained further visibility in 2017 by finishing second in the reality show Tu cara me suena Costa Rica. She is also known for combining music with comedic elements in her live performances.

== Discography ==
=== Singles ===
- 2013 – "Olvidarme de Ti"
- 2014 – "No Miro Atrás"
- 2015 – "A Tu Lado"
- 2016 – "No iré corriendo"
- 2017 – "Rumba en mi piel"
- 2019 – "Decide por favor"
- 2020 – "Santa ya llegó"
- 2022 – "Qué pena, pero qué rico"
