= Amaia discography =

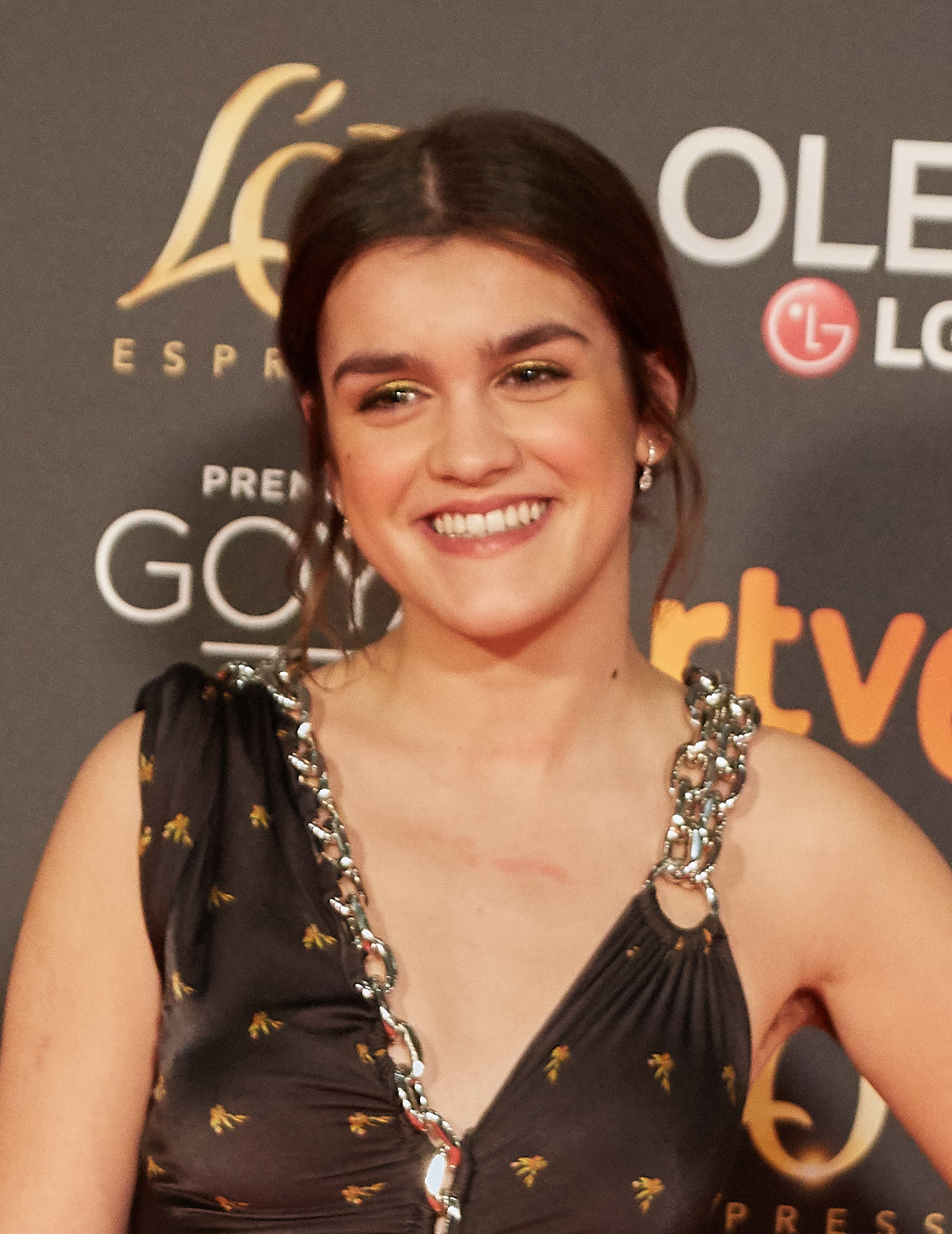
- Studio albums: 2
- Compilation albums: 1
- Singles: 12
- Music videos: 11

Spanish singer Amaia has released two studio albums and twelve singles. She took part in series nine of the reality television talent competition Operación Triunfo, which she won. She also represented Spain at the Eurovision Song Contest 2018, along with Alfred García, with the song "Tu canción". They finished in twenty-third place. She released her debut studio album Pero no pasa nada in September 2019, which includes the singles "El relámpago" and "Quedará en nuestra mente".

== Albums ==
=== Studio albums ===
Title	Details	Peak chart positions	Certifications
Title	Details	SPA	Certifications
Pero No Pasa Nada	Released: 20 September 2019; Formats: Digital download, CD, LP; Label: Universal Music Spain	1	PROMUSICAE: Gold
Cuando No Sé Quién Soy	Released: 13 May 2022; Formats: Digital download, CD, LP; Label: Universal Music Spain	2	

=== Compilation albums ===
Title	Details	Peak chart positions
Title	Details	SPA
Sus Canciones (Operación Triunfo 2017)	Released: 9 March 2018; Formats: Digital download, CD; Label: Universal Music Spain	3

== Singles ==
=== As lead artist ===
Title	Year	Peak chart positions	Certifications	Album
Title	Year	SPA	Certifications	Album
"Tu canción" (with Alfred García)	2018	3	PROMUSICAE: Platinum	Sus Canciones (Operación Triunfo 2017)
"El relámpago"	2019	24		Pero no pasa nada
"Quedará en nuestra mente"	2019	65		Pero no pasa nada
"Quiero que vengas"	2019	87		Pero no pasa nada
"Nuevo Verano"	2020	—		Pero no pasa nada
"Quiero que vengas"	2020	87		Pero no pasa nada
"Cosas interesantes para decir"	2020	—		Non-album single
"El Encuentro" (with Alizzz)	2020	36	PROMUSICAE: Platinum	Tiene que haber algo más
"Yo Invito"	2021	57		Cuando No Sé Quién Soy
"Quiero Pero No" (with Rojuu)	2021	—		Cuando No Sé Quién Soy
"Yamaguchi"	2022	—		Cuando No Sé Quién Soy
"Bienvenidos al Show"	2022	88		Cuando No Sé Quién Soy
"La Canción Que No Quiero Cantarte" (with Aitana)	2022	59	PROMUSICAE: Gold	Cuando No Sé Quién Soy
"Así Bailaba" (with Rigoberta Bandini)	2022	41	PROMUSICAE: Gold	Non-album singles
"—" denotes a recording that did not chart or was not released.

=== As featured artist ===
Title	Year	Peak chart positions	Album
Title	Year	SPA	Album
"Perdona (Ahora sí que sí)" (Carolina Durante featuring Amaia Romero)	2018	35	Non-album singles
"Esos Ojos Negros" (Mikel Erentxun featuring Amaia)	2021	—	Non-album singles
"—" denotes a recording that did not chart or was not released.

=== Promotional singles ===
Title	Year	Peak position	Album
Title	Year	SPA	Album
"City of Stars" (Amaia Romero & Alfred García)	2017	61	Sus Canciones (Operación Triunfo 2017)
"Shape of You" (Amaia Romero & Roi Méndez)	2017	92	Sus Canciones (Operación Triunfo 2017)
"Shake It Out"	2018	15	Sus Canciones (Operación Triunfo 2017)
"Soñar Contigo"	2018	85	Sus Canciones (Operación Triunfo 2017)
"Love on the Brain"	2018	60	Sus Canciones (Operación Triunfo 2017)
"Al Cantar"	2018	62	Sus Canciones (Operación Triunfo 2017)
"Miedo"	2018	21	Sus Canciones (Operación Triunfo 2017)
"Un Nuevo Lugar"	2018	37	Sus Canciones (Operación Triunfo 2017)
"Nadie Podría Hacerlo"	2019	—	Pero no pasa nada
"—" denotes a recording that did not chart or was not released.
