= Alfred García discography =

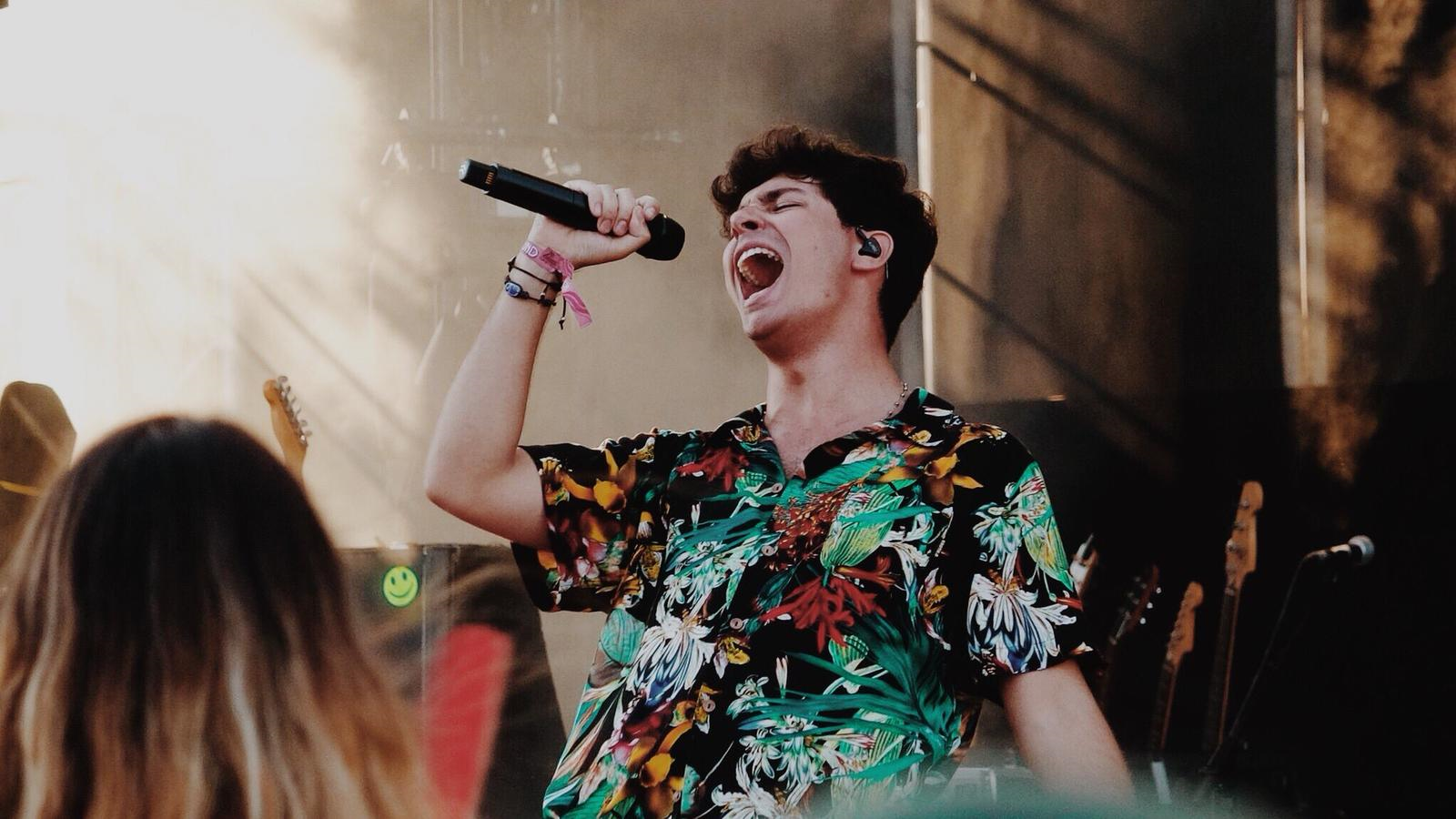
- Alfred performing at the 2019 Arenal Sound festival.
- Studio albums: 4
- Singles: 8

The discography of Alfred García, a Spanish singer. He released his debut studio album, Beginning in 2012. García self-produced and self-published the album. He released his second studio album, Inblack (Volume One) in December 2016. He once again self-produced and self-published the album. In 2017, he took part in series nine of the reality television talent competition Operación Triunfo, where he finished in fourth place. He also represented Spain at the Eurovision Song Contest 2018, along with Amaia, with the song "Tu canción". They finished in twenty-third place. His third studio album, 1016 was released in December 2018. The album peaked at number two on the Spanish Albums Chart. The album includes the singles "De la Tierra hasta Marte", "Wonder" and "Londres". He re-released the album titled, 1016. El Círculo Rojo in November 2019 and includes the single "Amar volar al invierno".

== Albums ==
=== Studio albums ===
Title	Details	Peak chart positions	Certifications
Title	Details	SPA	Certifications
Beginning	Released: 2012; Formats: Digital download; Self-published	—	
Inblack (Volume One)	Released: 24 December 2016; Formats: Digital download; Self-published	—	
1016	Released: 14 December 2018; Formats: Digital download, CD; Label: Universal Music Spain	2	PROMUSICAE: Platinum
1997	Release: 29 October 2021; Formats: Digital download, CD; Label: Universal Music Spain	5	
T'estimo es te quiero	Release: 30 May 2025; Formats: Digital download, CD; Label: Música Global	59	

=== Studio album reissues ===
Title	Details
1016. El Círculo Rojo	Released: 1 November 2019; Formats: Digital download, CD; Label: Universal Music Spain

=== Live albums ===
Title	Details
1016 En Directo: Fin de Gira	Released: 17 July 2020; Formats: Digital download, CD; Label: Universal Music Spain

== Singles ==
=== As lead artist ===
Title	Year	Peak position	Certifications	Album
Title	Year	SPA	Certifications	Album
"Tu canción" (with Amaia Romero)	2018	3	PROMUSICAE: Platinum	Non-album single
"De la Tierra hasta Marte"	2018	12	PROMUSICAE: Gold	1016
"Wonder" (featuring Pavvla)	2019	95		1016
"Londres"	2019	58		1016
"Amar volar al invierno"	2019	—		1016. El Círculo Rojo
"Los Espabilados"	2021	—		1997
"Praia dos Moinhos"	2021	—		1997
"Toro de Cristal"	2021	—		1997
"2001"	2022	—		Non-album single
"Electricitat" (with Miki Núñez)	2022	—		Non-album single
"Desde que tú estás"	2022	—		Non-album single

=== As featured artist ===
Title	Year	Album
"Cicatriz" (Isma Romero featuring Alfred García)	2019	Non-album single

=== Selected releases from Operación Triunfo 2017 ===
Title	Year	Peak position	Certifications
Title	Year	SPA	Certifications
"City of Stars" (Amaia Romero & Alfred García)	2017	61	
"Que nos sigan las luces"	2018	19	PROMUSICAE: Gold

== Other charted songs ==
Title	Year	Peak position	Album
Title	Year	SPA	Album
"Et vull veure" (featuring Amaia Romero)	2018	64	1016
