= Manel Navarro =

Spanish singer-songwriter (born 1996)

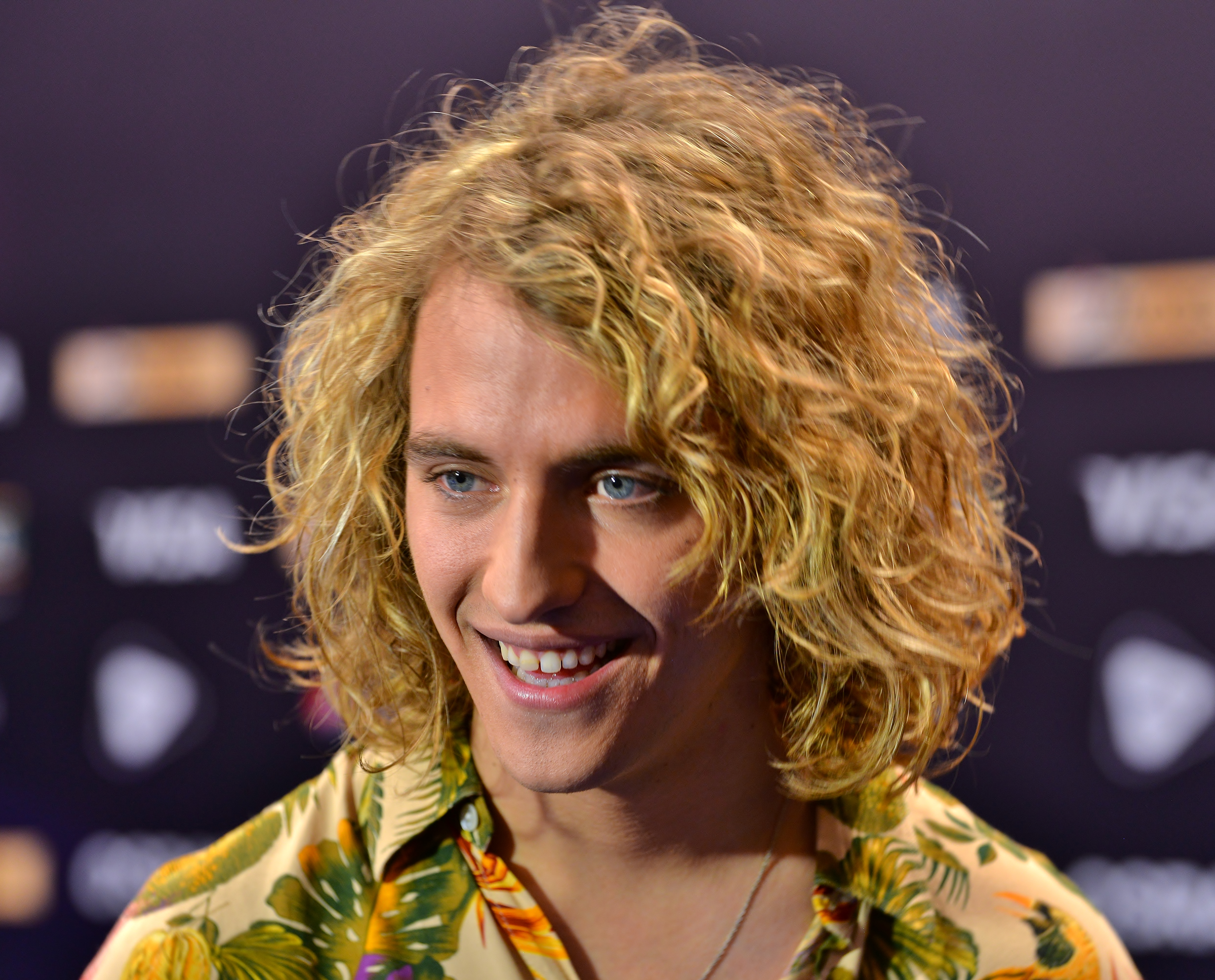
- Navarro in 2017

Background information
- Born: Manel Navarro Quesada; 7 March 1996 (age 30); Sabadell, Catalonia, Spain
- Genres: Pop
- Occupations: Singer; songwriter
- Instruments: Vocals; guitar
- Years active: 2014–present
- Labels: Sony Music Spain (2014–2018); Universal Music Spain (2018–present)

Manel Navarro Quesada (born 7 March 1996) is a Spanish singer and songwriter. He represented Spain in the Eurovision Song Contest 2017 with the song "Do It for Your Lover" and finished last in the final.

== Career ==
=== 2014–16: Early beginnings ===
Navarro first came to prominence in 2014, when he won the second edition of the regional contest for young singers, Catalunya Teen Star, with an acoustic cover of "Hold On, We're Going Home" by Drake. He also had a YouTube channel where he would publish acoustic covers of songs. Following his victory, he was signed to record label TeenStarRecords, and released his debut single, "Brand New Day", on 4 December 2014. Navarro served as the opening act at Sweet California's 2015 tour Wonder Tour. In 2015, Navarro was signed to Sony Music Spain, and on 24 June 2016, he released his first single with Sony, "Candle", which reached number two at Spotify's Viral 50 chart in Spain.

=== 2017: Eurovision Song Contest ===
In January 2017, Navarro's second single with Sony, "Do It for Your Lover", was released. On 12 January 2017, Navarro was announced as one of the six candidates to represent Spain in the Eurovision Song Contest 2017 with "Do It for Your Lover". On 11 February 2017, he was declared the winner of the national final amid much controversy, and thus represented Spain at the Eurovision Song Contest 2017 in Kyiv, Ukraine. In the national final, Navarro was awarded the first place in the jury panel's vote but came third in the popular vote. The controversy arose from the presence in the jury panel of Los 40 radio host Xavi Martínez, who had previously promoted Navarro on his radio program and via Twitter; Martínez awarded the minimum possible points to Navarro's most direct competitor and eventual public vote's favourite Mirela. Navarro and Mirela tied in number of points, and the jury panel selected Navarro as the winner in a tie-break voting round. Loud boos and accusations of rigging could be heard from the audience at the studio, to which Navarro responded with a bras d'honneur. He would apologise for the gesture two days later during a TVE press conference. At the Eurovision Song Contest final, he finished in last place: Navarro obtained no points from the professional juries and only five points from the public televote, all of which came from Portugal. He also suffered a voice crack at the climax of the song, which led to thousands of memes calling him "gallo", which in Spanish means both "voice crack" and "rooster." Boos could once again be heard at the end of the act.

On 2 June 2017, Navarro released the follow-up single "Keep On Falling".

=== 2018—present: After Eurovision ===
On 27 April 2018, after signing to Universal, Navarro released the single "Voulez-vous danser?".

On 25 October 2019, Navarro released "Mi mejor despedida" featuring the Spanish band Funambulista, the first single from his upcoming first studio album.

Navarro's first studio album, titled Cicatriz, was released on 23 April 2021.

== Discography ==
=== Albums ===
Title	Details	Peak position
Title	Details	SPA
Cicatriz	Released: 23 April 2021; Formats: Digital download, CD; Label: Música Global Discogràfica	73

=== Singles ===
Title	Year	Peak position		Album
Title	Year	SPA	SWE Heat	Album
"Brand New Day"	2014	—	—	Non-album singles
"Candle"	2016	—	—	Non-album singles
"Do It for Your Lover"	2017	75	16	Non-album singles
"Keep On Falling"	2017	—	—	Non-album singles
"Voulez-vous danser?"	2018	—	—	Non-album singles
"Roller Coaster Ride" (with JOWST and Maria Celin)	2018	—	—	Non-album singles
"Mi mejor despedida" (with Funambulista)	2019	—	—	Cicatriz
"Que te vaya bien" (with Belén Aguilera)	2020	—	—	Cicatriz
"Los restos" (with Bruno Alves)	2020	—	—	Non-album singles
"Quiéreme" (with Bely Basarte)	2020	—	—	Cicatriz
"Que Tengas Suerte" (with David Otero)	2021	—	—	Cicatriz
"¿Qué Tal?" (with Miki Núñez)	2021	—	—	Cicatriz
"Pierda" (with Danny Romero)	2021	—	—	Non-album singles
"—" denotes a single that did not chart or was not released in that territory.

Preceded by Barei with "Say Yay!"	Spain in the Eurovision Song Contest; 2017	Succeeded by Amaia & Alfred with "Tu canción"
