= El Número Uno =

- Genre: Talent show
- Directed by: Tinet Rubira; Nía Sanjuán
- Presented by: Paula Vázquez
- Country of origin: Spain
- Original language: Spanish
- No. of seasons: 2
- No. of episodes: 19

Production
- Executive producer: Anna Cambrubi
- Producer: Gestmusic Endemol
- Production location: Barcelona

Original release
- Network: Antena 3 (Spain); Antena 3 Internacional
- Release: March 26, 2012 – July 5, 2013

El Número Uno ("The Number One") is a Spanish reality television music competition which started in March 2012, and was renewed for a second season which aired in 2013. In this show, a group of five judges evaluate 100 contestants to find "The Number One" of music in Spain.

== Jury ==
- Ana Torroja
- David Bustamante
- Miguel Bosé
- Mónica Naranjo
- Natalia Jiménez
- Sergio Dalma

== Weeks ==
=== Week 1 ===
Miguel Bosé's group

Order	Contestant	Song	Result
1	Amaia Romero	Here comes the sun	Armored
2	Alberto Pestaña	Volver	Armored
3	Ignacio Unceta	Price tag	Unselected
4	Sergio Campoy	El secreto de las tortugas	Armored
5	Laia Vehí	Someone like you	Armored
6	Roko	Rolling in the deep	Safe

Natalia Jiménez's group

Order	Contestant	Song	Result
7	Jota	Cuatro Elemenos	Unselected
8	Aridian	Cuatro Elemenos	Unselected
9	Sebas	Greatest love of all	Armored
10	Aixa	Saving all my love for you	Unselected
11	Meritxell Negre	I have nothing	Armored

Sergio Dalma's group

Order	Contestant	Song	Result
12	Susana Germade	Mediterránio	Unselected
13	Deme	No puedo vivir sin ti	Unselected
14	Lady Cherry	Shout	Armored

Ana Torroja's group

Order	Contestant	Song	Result
15	Dan Michaels	Libre	Armored
16	Carmen María	Libre	Unselected
17	Garson	Redemption song	Armored
18	Pablo Vega	Aléjate de mí	Armored

David Bustamante's group

Order	Contestant	Song	Result
19	Dana Kozak	O mio babbino caro	Armored
20	Javi	Devuélveme la vida	Unselected
21	Maribel Castillo	Devuélveme la vida	Unselected
22	Hermi Callejón	Valerie	Armored
23	Edu Cayuela	Valerie	Armored
24	Jadel	We found love	Armored
25	Patrizia Ruiz	We found love	Armored

=== Week 2 ===
- Celebrity guest:Jason Mraz, El sueño de Morfeo

Order	Artist	Song	Results
1	Edu Cayuela	Mi gran noche	Duel 17%
2	Garson	On Broadway	Armoned
3	Amaia Romero	Muñeca de cera	Armoned
4	Dan Michaels	Crazy little thing called love	Safe 18%
5	Patrizia Ruiz	Yo no te pido la luna	Eliminated 14%
6	Pablo Vega	The reason	Safe 24%
7	Lady Cherry	Da doo ron ron	Safe 20%
8	Sebas Robben	Lets stay together	Armoned
9	Jadel	Aquí estoy yo	Armoned
10	Laia Vehí	Put your records on	Armoned
11	Alberto Pestaña	Ella y la que se fue	Armoned
12	Hermi Callejón	What a fool believes	Armoned
13	Dana Kozak	Sempre Libera	Armoned
14	Roko	Tu corazón	Armoned
15	Meritxell Negre	Purple Rain	Armoned
16	Sergio Campoy	Firework	Eliminated 7%

== Weeks ==
Place	Singer	Week 1	Week 2	Week 3	Week 4	Week 5	Week 6	Week 7	Week 8	Week 9	Week 10	Week 11	Week 12	Week 13
1	Jadel	Armored	Armored	Armored	Armored	Armored	Armored	Armored	Armored	Armored	Armored	Duel	Safe	Winner
2	Roko	Safe	Armored	Armored	Armored	Armored	Armored	Armored	Armored	Safe	Armored	Safe	Armored	Runner-up
3	Garson	Armored	Armored	Duel	Armored	Safe	Armored	Armored	Armored	Safe	Safe	Safe	Safe	3rd Place
4	Hermi Callejon	Armored	Armored	Armored	Duel	Safe	Safe	Armored	Safe	Duel	Armored	Armored	Duel	4th Place
5	Pablo Vega	Armored	Safe	Armored	Safe	Safe	Safe	Safe	Armored	Safe	Safe	Safe	Eliminated	
6	Laia Vehí	Armored	Armored	Armored	Armored	Armored	Armored	Duel	Armored	Duel	Duel	Eliminated		
7	Sebas Robben	Armored	Armored	Armored	Armored	Duel	Armored	Armored	Armored	Armored	Eliminated			
8	Edu Cayuela	Armored	Duel	Safe	Armored	Armored	Armored	Safe	Duel	Eliminated				
9	Dan Michaels	Armored	Safe	Safe	Armored	Safe	Safe	Armored	Eliminated					
10	Alberto Pestaña	Armored	Armored	Armored	Armored	Safe	Duel	Eliminated						
11	Amaia Romero	Armored	Armored	Armored	Armored	Armored	Eliminated							
12	Meritxell Negre	Armored	Armored	Armored	Armored	Eliminated								
13	Dana Kozak	Armored	Armored	Armored	Eliminated									
14	Lady Cherry	Armored	Safe	Eliminated										
15-16	Patrizia Ruiz	Armored	Eliminated											
15-16	Sergio Campoy	Armored	Eliminated											
17-25	Ignacio Unceta	Eliminated												
17-25	Javi	Eliminated												
17-25	Maribel	Eliminated												
17-25	Carmen María	Eliminated												
17-25	Jota	Eliminated												
17-25	Susana Germade	Eliminated												
17-25	Aridian	Eliminated												
17-25	Deme	Eliminated												
17-25	Aixa	Eliminated												

== Eliminations ==
Judge	Week 1	Week 2	Week 3	Week 4	Week 5	Week 6	Week 7	Week 8	Week 9	Week 10	Week 11	Week 12
Miguel’s vote	Roko*	Edu Cayuela	Lady Cherry	Dana Kozak	Sebas Robben	Amaia Romero	Laia Vehí	Edu Cayuela	Laia Vehí	Laia Vehí	Jadel	Hermi Callejón
Natalia’s vote	Roko*	Edu Cayuela	Garson	Hermi Callejón	Sebas Robben	Alberto Pestaña	Alberto Pestaña	Edu Cayuela	Hermi Callejón	Sebas Robben	Laia Vehí	Pablo Vega
Sergio’s vote	Roko*	Edu Cayuela	Lady Cherry	Hermi Callejón	Meritxell Negre	Alberto Pestaña*	Laia Vehí	Dan Michaels	Laia Vehí*	Laia Vehí	Jadel*	Hermi Callejón
Ana’s vote	Roko*	Edu Cayuela	Garson	Hermi Callejón	Sebas Robben	Alberto Pestaña	Laia Vehí	Dan Michaels	Laia Vehí	Laia Vehí	Jadel	Hermi Callejón
David’s vote	Roko*	Patrizia Ruiz Sergio Campoy	Garson	Dana Kozak	Meritxell Negre	Amaia Romero	Laia Vehí	Edu Cayuela	Hermi Callejón	Sebas Robben	Jadel	Pablo Vega*
Eliminates	Unselected	Patrizia Ruiz Sergio Campoy	Lady Cherry	Dana Kozak	Meritxell Negre	Amaia Romero	Alberto Pestaña	Dan Michaels	Edu Cayuela	Sebas Robben	Laia Vehí	Pablo Vega

(*)
