= Pero No Pasa Nada =

Studio album by Amaia
- Released: 20 September 2019
- Recorded: November 2018 – May 2019
- Studio: Various: The Bridge; (New York City, New York); Siesta del Fauno; (Buenos Aires, Argentina); Medusa Recording (Barcelona, Spain)
- Genre: Sunshine pop; lo-fi
- Length: 31:50
- Language: Spanish
- Label: Universal Music
- Producer: Amaia Romero (exec.); Santiago Barrionuevo; Nuria Graham

Amaia chronology
Sus Canciones (2018)	Pero No Pasa Nada (2019)	Cuando No Sé Quién Soy (2022)

Singles from Pero No Pasa Nada
- 1. "El Relámpago" Released: 3 May 2019; 2. "Quedará En Nuestra Mente" Released: 2 August 2019; 3. "Quiero Que Vengas" Released: 20 September 2019; 4. "Nuevo Verano" Released: 29 July 2020

Pero No Pasa Nada (Spanish for "But it's no big deal") is the debut studio album by Spanish singer and songwriter Amaia. It was released through Universal Music Spain on 20 September 2019. Consisting of ten solo tracks, the album is "an ode to a person's twenties". Produced by Santiago Motorizado, Núria Graham and the singer herself, it spawned four singles: "El Relámpago", "Quedará en Nuestra Mente", "Quiero Que Vengas" and "Nuevo Verano" as well as the promotional single "Nadie Podría Hacerlo". Pero No Pasa Nada debuted atop the Spanish PROMUSICAE albums chart.

Una Vuelta al Sol, a documentary starring Amaia that followed the production and composition of the album, was released on Amazon Prime Video on May 1, 2020. It received a nomination for Best Long Form Music Video at the 21st Latin Grammy Awards.

== Background ==
Since Amaia (then under the stage name of Amaia Romero) won the ninth edition of the Spanish talent show Operación Triunfo in early 2018, a lot of critical and popular expectation rose on how the singer would shape her first studio album. She expanded her pre-contract with Universal Music a month later. Once on a tour break later in the year Amaia stated that her debut album would be produced by Raül Refree who she admired since his work with Rosalía on her 2017 studio album Los Ángeles. A month later, Amaia was captured leaving the studio in New York City.

The album went through a lot of stages since the singer couldn't "find commodity" during the whole recording process. The urge her fans and Universal put on her didn't help either. In early 2019 rumors of a bad relationship between Amaia's manager Javier Romero and the director of the record label sparked online as disagreements in deadlines and decisions rose. Universal Music ordered Amaia to release a song before the tenth series of Operación Triunfo ended. To meet the deadline, the singer released "Un Nuevo Lugar", a very organic promotional single on 18 December 2018.

In January, Romero was confirmed to be part of the Warm Up Festival, which was set in Murcia in May 2019. Narcís Rebollo, the president of Universal Music Spain, confirmed a month later that the album would be released in September. While being asked about the controversial creative process Rebollo stated that: "she wants to work in the whole part of composition, production, there are profiles of artists who have the ability or ease of making an album in six months and Amaia requires more time" and denied the rumors about a possible logistical dispute. Nevertheless, in April 2019 it was reported that an economic conflict between Rebollo and Refree caused the elimination of all the material produced by him, which became the reason of Amaia working with Motorizado. It was reported that over twenty songs were urgently composed in less than a month. In the documentary film Una Vuelta al Sol, Amaia explains that she didn't like the direction the first version of the album was heading to with Refree, due to the delicacy and mysticality of the music, which felt "too much for a debut album" for her.

On 26 April 2019, the singer finally announced the release of her first solo single. "El Relámpago" was released on May 3 and peaked at number 24 on the PROMUSICAE chart and stayed on the list for over three weeks. The first promotional single, "Nadie Podría Hacerlo" was released on 21 June 2019. The second official single was released on August 2, 2019, and titled "Quedará en nuestra mente". Amaia announced on 28 June 2019, through her respective social media profiles that her first studio album Pero No Pasa Nada would be released in September. She also revealed its cover, tracklist and tour. On 18 August 2019, the singer announced the official release date of the album.

== Promotion ==
=== Singles ===
The album's first official single, "El Relámpago", was announced on 26 April 2019, and released a week later. It received generally positive reviews for its epic instrumental and well-produced music video. The song peaked at 24 on the Spanish musical chart PROMUSICAE. It didn't last very long on the chart due to its low streaming numbers. A 7 inch single was released on 21 June 2019 with its B-side "Nadie Podría Hacerlo".

"Quedará en nuestra mente" was released on 2 August 2019, as the album's second single.

=== Promotional singles ===
"Nadíe Podria Hacerlo" was released as the album's first promotional single on 21 June 2019.

=== Tour ===
Pero No Pasa Nada Tour
- Tour by Amaia
- Associated albums: Pero No Pasa Nada
- Start date: October 5, 2019
- End date: September 12, 2020
- Legs: 1
- No. of shows: 25 in Europe; 1 in Latin America; 26 in total

Amaia concert chronology
- OT 2017 en concierto (2018); Pero No Pasa Nada Tour (2019-2020)

Pero No Pasa Nada Tour is the first solo concert tour by Spanish singer and songwriter Amaia. The tour will support her debut album Pero No Pasa Nada. It began on October 5, 2019, at the Auditorio Baluarte in Pamplona. The tour is set to end on May 9, 2020, at the Cartuja Center in Seville. After a lot of speculation, the singer revealed the first fourteen dates of her debut tour on June 28, 2019, though her social media. Tour tickets went on sale on July 5, 2019. After less than a day, the tour's first show sold-out. A second show in Pamplona was announced on July 22 and also sold out in 24 hours. A second concert in Madrid was announced on September 5. The tickets for the concerts in Barcelona and Valencia also sold-out but there's no plan to add a second date in those cities. Two new corcerts in Huelva and Córdoba were announced on December 2, 2019. Due to phenomenal demand, Amaia announced during her performance at the Liceu that she would come back to the city in June. She'll also perform in Barcelona as part of Primavera Sound, one of the most important music festivals in the world and the most important in Spain.

In March 2020, after many space restrictions ordered by the Government of Spain to prevent the spread of COVID-19, many dates where postponed to fall or 2021 or were even cancelled.

==== Set list ====
This set list is from the concert on October 5, 2019, in Pamplona. It is not intended to represent all shows from the tour.

1. "Un Día Perdido"
2. "Todos Estos Años"
3. "Cosas interesantes para decir"
4. "Quedará En Nuestra Mente"
5. "La victoria"
6. "Medio Drogados" (Los Fresones Rebeldes cover)
7. "Última Vez"
8. "El Puerto" (written by Isaac Albéniz)
9. "Qué Nos Va a Pasar?" (La Buena Vida cover)
10. "Un Nuevo Lugar"
11. "Porque Apareciste"
12. "Nadie Podría Hacerlo"
13. "Cuando Estés Triste"
14. "Vas a Volverme Loca" (Natalia cover)
15. "Quiero Que Vengas"
16. "El Relámpago"
17. "Desde Que Te Has Ido" (Cecilia cover)
18. "Nuevo Verano"

==== Tour dates ====
List of concerts, showing date, city, country, venue, tickets sold, number of available tickets and amount of gross revenue
Date	City	Country	Venue	Attendance	Revenue
Leg I - Europe
October 5, 2019	Pamplona	Spain	Auditorio Baluarte	3,098 / 3,098	$109,410
October 6, 2019	Pamplona	Spain	Auditorio Baluarte	3,098 / 3,098	$109,410
October 18, 2019	Gijón	Spain	Teatro de la Laboral	1,152 / 1,276	$40,157
October 19, 2019	A Coruña	Spain	Palacio de la Ópera	1,306 / 1,727	$47,527
October 31, 2019	Girona	Spain	Auditori de Girona	1,079 / 1,177	$45,785
November 1, 2019 (Note: The concert on November 1, 2019 at the Bilbao Exhibition Centre in Bilbao is part of the 2019 BIME festival.)	Bilbao	Spain	Bilbao Exhibition Centre	—	—
November 8, 2019	Granada	Spain	Palacio de Congresos	1,048 / 1,988	$38,417
November 23, 2019	Valencia	Spain	Palau de les Arts Reina Sofia	1,495 / 1,495	$51,206
December 20, 2019	Barcelona	Spain	Gran Teatre del Liceu	2,229 / 2,229	$98,920
January 16, 2020	Madrid	Spain	Teatro Circo Price	3,592 / 3,592	$128,478
January 17, 2020	Madrid	Spain	Teatro Circo Price	3,592 / 3,592	$128,478
February 1, 2020	Valladolid	Spain	Auditorio Miguel Delibes	—	—
February 21, 2020	Palma	Spain	Auditorium	—	—
August 27, 2020 (Note: The concert on August 27, 2020 at the Hotel Santos Ibiza in Ibiza was originally scheduled to take place on July 2, 2020 but was rescheduled due to the 2019-20 coronavirus outbreak.)	Ibiza	Spain	Santos Suites Ibiza	—	—
September 12, 2020	Barcelona	Spain	Parc del Fòrum	—	—
Total					—

==== Cancelled shows ====
List of cancelled concerts, showing date, city, country, venue and reason for cancellation
Date	City	Country	Venue	Reason
March 28, 2020 (Note: The concert on March 28, 2020 at the Hipódromo de San Isidro in Buenos Aires was part of Lollapalooza.)	Buenos Aires	Argentina	Hipódromo de San Isidro	COVID-19 pandemic
April 24, 2020	Huelva	Spain	Gran Teatro	Unknown
May 9, 2020	Córdoba	Spain	Teatro de la Axerquía	Conflicts with the venue
June 20, 2020 (Note: The concert on June 20, 2020 at the Puerto de Málaga in Málaga is part of Brisa Music Festival.)	Málaga	Spain	Puerto de Málaga	COVID-19 pandemic. Inability to asure social distance due to high ticket sales.
July 8, 2020	Valencia	Spain	Jardins de Vivers	COVID-19 pandemic. Inability to asure social distance due to high ticket sales.
July 25, 2020 (Note: The concert on July 25, 2020 at the A Illa de Arousa in Pontevedra is part of Atlantic Fest.)	Pontevedra	Spain	A Illa de Arousa	COVID-19 pandemic. Inability to asure social distance due to high ticket sales.
September 5, 2020 (Note: The concert on September 5, 2020 at the Auditorio Victor Villegas in Murcia was originally scheduled to take place on March 21, 2020 but was rescheduled due to the 2019-20 coronavirus outbreak.)	Murcia	Spain	Auditorio Victor Villegas	COVID-19 pandemic. Inability to asure social distance due to high ticket sales.
September 20, 2020 (Note: The concert on September 20, 2020 at the Cartuja Center in Seville was originally scheduled to take place on April 18, 2020 but was rescheduled due to the 2019-20 coronavirus outbreak.)	Seville	Spain	Cartuja Center	COVID-19 pandemic. Inability to asure social distance due to high ticket sales.
October 16, 2020 (Note: The concert on October 16, 2020 at the Auditorio Rincón de Goya in Zaragoza was originally scheduled to take place on March 14, 2020 but was rescheduled due to the 2019-20 coronavirus outbreak.)	Zaragoza	Spain	Auditorio del Rincón de Goya	COVID-19 pandemic. Inability to asure social distance due to high ticket sales.
October 17, 2020	Roquetas de Mar	Spain	Teatro Auditorio	COVID-19 pandemic. Inability to asure social distance due to high ticket sales.
November 15, 2020 (Note: The concert on November 15, 2020 at Kursaal in San Sebastián was originally scheduled to take place on October 11, 2020 but was rescheduled due to a positive COVID-19 case in the tour crew.)	San Sebastián	Spain	Kursaal	COVID-19 diagnosis

== Track listing ==
Credits adapted from Tidal.

No.	Title	Writer(s)	Producer(s)	Length
1.	"Última Vez"	Amaia Romero	Santiago Barrionuevo	1:07
2.	"Quedará En Nuestra Mente"	Romero	Barrionuevo	3:51
3.	"El Relámpago"	Romero · Barrionuevo	Romero · Barrionuevo	4:37
4.	"Nuevo Verano"	Romero · Raül Refree	Romero · Barrionuevo	4:05
5.	"Nadie Podría Hacerlo"	Romero · Núria Graham	Romero · Barrionuevo	2:29
6.	"Quiero Que Vengas"	Romero · Barrionuevo	Romero · Barrionuevo	3:18
7.	"Todos Estos Años"	Romero · Barrionuevo	Romero · Barrionuevo	3:04
8.	"Un Día Perdido"	Romero · Barrionuevo	Romero · Barrionuevo	2:53
9.	"Cuando Estés Triste"	Barrionuevo	Romero · Barrionuevo	3:36
10.	"Porque Apareciste"	Graham	Romero · Barrionuevo	2:55
Total length:				31:50

== Charts ==
=== Weekly charts ===
Chart (2019)	Peak position
Spanish Albums (PROMUSICAE)	1

=== Year-end charts ===
Chart (2019)	Position
Spanish Albums (PROMUSICAE)	42
Chart (2020)	Position
Spanish Albums (PROMUSICAE)	79

== Certifications ==
Certifications and sales for Pero No Pasa Nada
Region	Certification	Certified units/sales
Spain (PROMUSICAE)	Gold	20,000^{‡}
^{‡} Sales+streaming figures based on certification alone.

== Release history ==
Region	Date	Format(s)	Label
Various	September 20, 2019	CD; digital download; streaming; vinyl	Universal Music
