= Keep On Falling =

Single by Manel Navarro
- Released: 2 June 2017
- Recorded: 2016
- Genre: Pop
- Length: 3:54
- Label: Sony Music Spain

Manel Navarro singles chronology
"Do It for Your Lover" (2017)	"Keep On Falling" (2017)	"Voulez-vous danser?" (2018)

"Keep On Falling" is a song performed by Spanish singer Manel Navarro. The song was released as a digital download on 2 June 2017 by Sony Music Spain. The song peaked at number 37 on the Spanish Singles Chart. A lyric video for the song was uploaded to YouTube on 2 June 2017.

== Track listing ==
Digital download
No.	Title	Length
1.	"Keep on Falling"	3:54

Digital download (JOWST Remix)
No.	Title	Length
1.	"Keep on Falling (JOWST Remix)"	3:13

== Charts ==
Chart (2017)	Peak position
Spain (PROMUSICAE)	37

== Release history ==
Region	Date	Format	Label
Spain	2 June 2017	Digital download	Sony Music Spain
