= 1016 (album) =

Studio album by Alfred García
- Released: 14 December 2018
- Recorded: 2018
- Genre: Pop; soft rock; pop rock
- Length: 60:13
- Language: Spanish; English; Catalan
- Label: Universal Music Spain

Alfred García chronology
Inblack (Volume One) (2016)	1016 (2018)	1997 (2021)

Singles from 1016
- 1. "De la Tierra hasta Marte" Released: 5 December 2018; 2. "Wonder" Released: 7 June 2019; 3. "Londres" Released: 27 September 2019

Singles from 1016. El Círculo Rojo
- 1. "Amar volar al invierno" Released: 10 November 2019

1016 is the third studio album by Spanish singer Alfred García. It was released on 14 December 2018 by Universal Music Spain. The album includes the singles "De la Tierra hasta Marte" and "Wonder". The album peaked at number 2 on the Spanish Albums Chart. In support of his debut studio album, 1016, García embarked on the 1016 Tour, which began on February 28, 2019 and ended on November 9, 2019. The album was re-released on 1 November 2019 titled 1016. El Círculo Rojo.

== Singles ==
"De la Tierra hasta Marte" was released as the lead single from the album on 5 December 2018. The song peaked at number 12 on the Spanish Singles Chart. "Wonder" was released as the second single from the album on 7 June 2019. The song peaked at number 95 on the Spanish Singles Chart. "Londres" was released as the third single from the album on 27 September 2019. "Amar volar al invierno" was released as the lead single from the re-released album on 10 November 2019.

== Track listing ==
Standard edition
No.	Title	Length
1.	"De la Tierra hasta Marte"	3:16
2.	"Que Nos Sigan las Luces"	3:29
3.	"Londres"	3:14
4.	"Wonder" (feat. Pavvla)	3:17
5.	"La Ciudad"	3:32
6.	"1016"	3:08
7.	"Madrid"	4:01
8.	"Barcelona"	2:42
9.	"Et Vull Veure" (feat. Amaia Romero)	2:55
10.	"Volver a Empezar"	3:26
11.	"Sevilla"	4:25
12.	"No Cuentes Conmigo" (feat. Carlos Sadness)	4:42
13.	"Lo Que Puedo Dar"	2:56
14.	"Por Si Te Hace Falta"	4:55
15.	"Let Me Go" (feat. Santi Balmes)	7:18
16.	"Himno del Prat"	2:57
Total length:		60:13

1016. El Círculo Rojo
No.	Title	Length
17.	"Amar Volar al Invierno"	3:12
18.	"Comunicado Oficial" (feat. Rayden)	3:06
19.	"Crema La Nit" (feat. Txarango)	2:41
20.	"360"	3:03

== Charts ==
=== Weekly charts ===
Weekly chart performance for 1016
Chart (2018–19)	Peak position
Spanish Albums (PROMUSICAE)	2

=== Year-end charts ===
Year-end chart performance for 1016
Chart (2018)	Position
Spanish Albums (PROMUSICAE)	24
Chart (2019)	Position
Spanish Albums (PROMUSICAE)	29

== Certifications ==
Region	Certification	Certified units/sales
Spain (PROMUSICAE)	Platinum	40,000^{‡}
^{‡} Sales+streaming figures based on certification alone.

== Release history ==
Country	Date	Label	Format
Spain	14 December 2018	Universal Music Spain	Digital download; streaming
