= Alfred García =

Spanish singer-songwriter (born 1997)

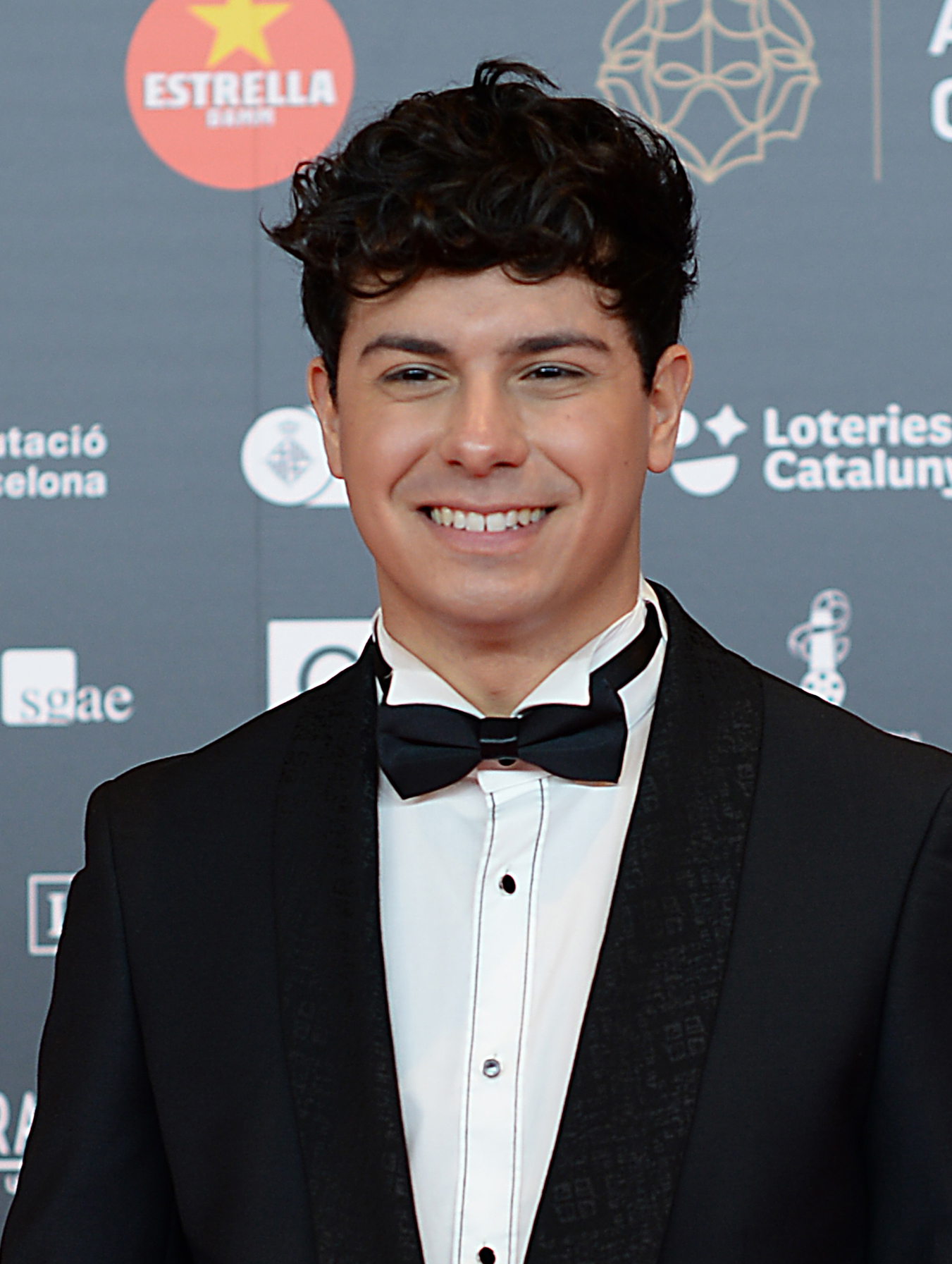
- García in 2020.

Background information
- Born: Alfred García Castillo; 14 March 1997 (age 29); El Prat de Llobregat, Catalonia, Spain
- Genres: Pop; Jazz; Alternative; Spanish rock
- Occupation: Singer
- Instruments: Vocals; trombone; guitar; keyboard; drums
- Years active: 2012–present

Alfred García Castillo (born 14 March 1997) is a Spanish singer-songwriter. He gained national recognition when he took part in series nine of the reality television talent competition Operación Triunfo, where he finished in fourth place, and also represented Spain in the Eurovision Song Contest 2018 in Lisbon, Portugal, alongside Amaia Romero, with the song "Tu canción", finishing in twenty-third place.

== Early life ==
García was born on 14 March 1997 in El Prat de Llobregat, Catalonia. He began formal training in vocals and trombone at the age of seven. García is also a self-taught guitarist, drummer, and keyboardist. He received musical training at the Unió Filharmònica del Prat. García graduated with a degree in audiovisual communication from Open University of Catalonia, as well as a higher degree in music and jazz and modern music studies at the Taller de Músics, a music school in Barcelona.

== Career ==
=== 2012–2016: Beginnings ===
At the age of fifteen, García released the self-produced and self-published album Beginning. At the age of seventeen, thanks to the musical project La Capsa, he recorded his first single "She Looks So Beautiful", written by himself and produced by Argentine musician Esteban García. The single won the Audience Award at the Festival Cara B in Barcelona. García has also released a musical short film, A Free Christmas Story.

In 2016, García participated in season four of talent show La Voz, the Spanish version of The Voice. He performed John Mayer's "Waiting on the World to Change" in the Blind Auditions, but none of the coaches turned for him. Also in 2016, García released the self-produced and self-published acoustic album Inblack (Volume One).

=== 2017–2018: Operación Triunfo and Eurovision ===
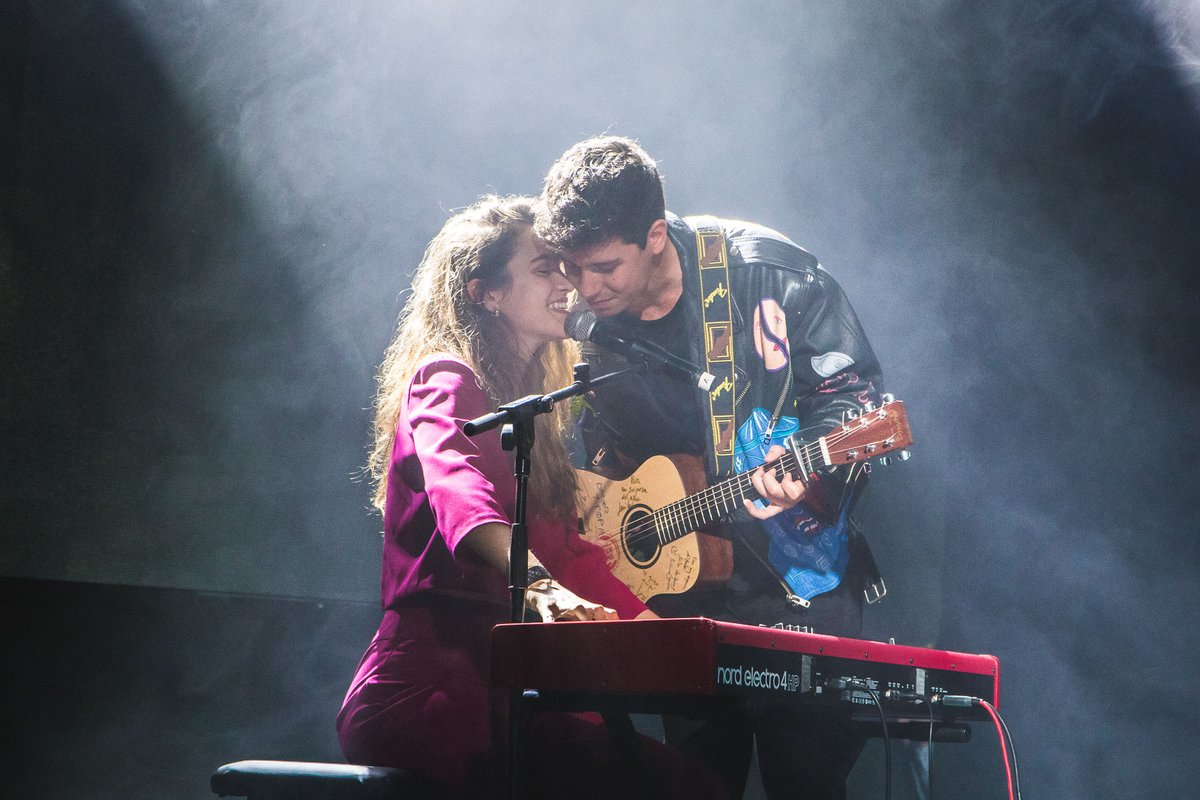
Amaia and Alfred performing at the Eurovision Pre-Party in Madrid in April 2018.

In 2017, García auditioned for series nine of reality television music competition Operación Triunfo. On 23 October 2017, he was selected to enter the show's "Academy". On 29 January 2018, during the special live show "Gala Eurovisión" of Operación Triunfo, he was selected by public vote to represent Spain in the Eurovision Song Contest 2018 along with his then-girlfriend Amaia Romero, with the song "Tu canción". During the finale of Operación Triunfo 2017 on 5 February 2018, García finished in fourth place.

Amaia and Alfred were the second to perform at the Eurovision final, held on 12 May 2018 in Lisbon, Portugal. They placed twenty-third out of the 26 participating countries with 61 points: 43 from the professional juries and 18 from the televote.

=== 2018–2019: 1016 ===
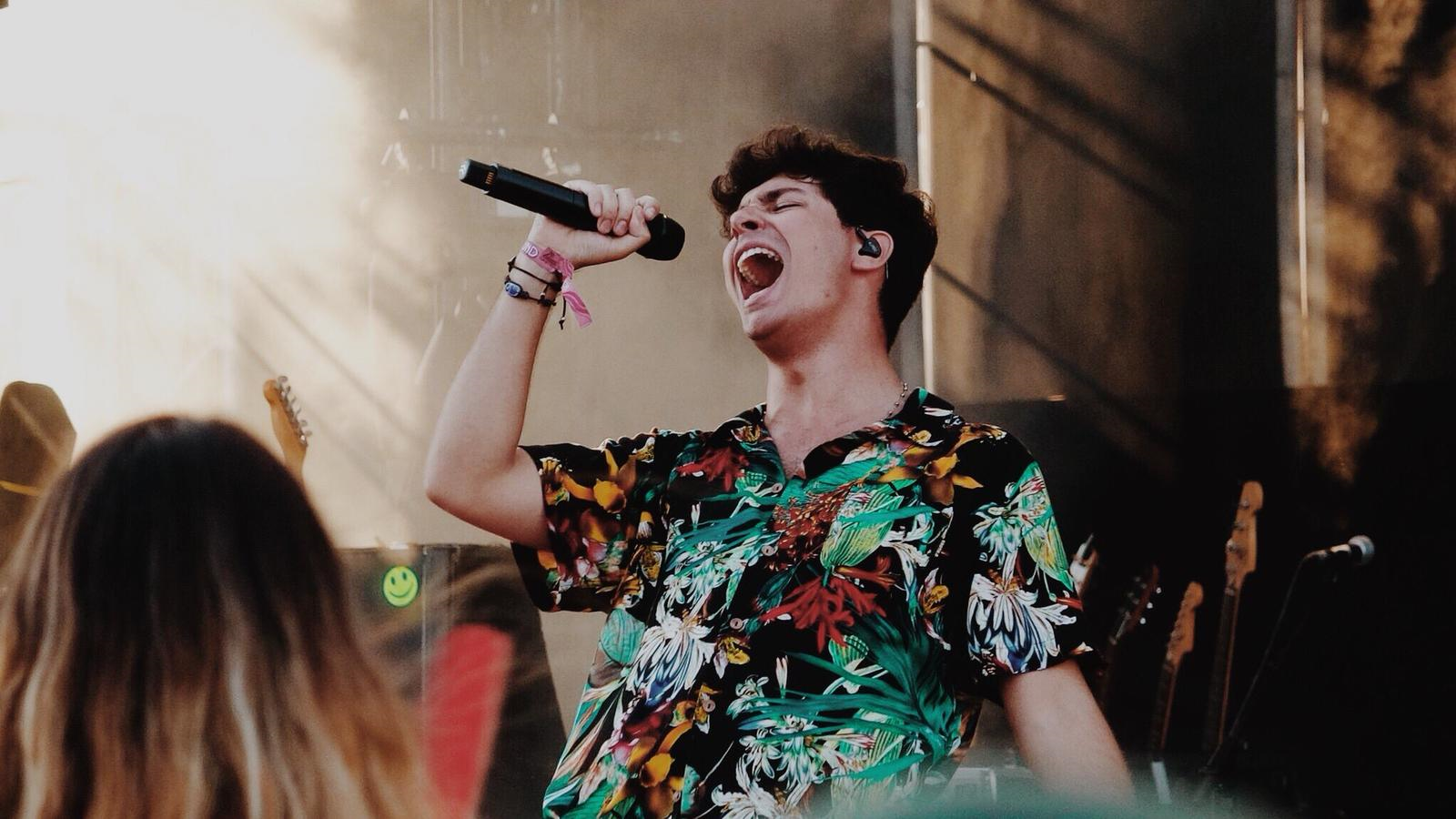
Alfred performing at the 2019 Arenal Sound festival.

Two days after returning from the Eurovision Song Contest, García started to record 1016, his first studio album with a major record label, Universal Music Spain. The album was preceded by the 1016 Is Coming tour in festivals across Spain in Summer 2018. In addition, García performed at a special charity concert of Operación Triunfo 2017 at the Santiago Bernabéu Stadium in Madrid on 29 June 2018, and made special guest appearances at concerts by David Bisbal or Love of Lesbian, among others.

"De la Tierra hasta Marte", the first single from 1016, was released on 5 December 2018. The album was released on 14 December 2018 and debuted at number 2 on the Spanish Albums Chart. In support of his debut studio album, 1016, García embarked on the 1016 Tour, which began on 28 February 2019 and ended on 9 November 2019.

=== 2021: 1997 ===
After a year-long hiatus, on 15 January 2021, García released "Los Espabilados", which served both as the first single from his upcoming studio album and the theme song for the Movistar+ series Alive and Kicking. Follow-up singles "Praia dos Moinhos" y "Toro de Cristal" were also included in the studio album 1997, released on 29 October 2021. The album debuted at number 5 on the Spanish Albums Chart.

=== 2022–2023: Benidorm Fest and Tu cara me suena ===
In September 2022, García was announced as part of the cast of the tenth season of reality television series Tu cara me suena.

In October 2022, García was selected to participate in the second edition of Benidorm Fest, the song festival organised to determine Spain's entry for the Eurovision Song Contest, with the song "Desde que tú estás". He finished in fifth place in the second semi-final, one position short of advancing to the national final.

In June 2023, García won Tu cara me suena with his performance of Michael Jackson's Billie Jean. He donated the proceeds to Heal Los Angeles Foundation.

=== 2025: T'estimo es te quiero ===
In May 2025 García released his third studio album "T'estimo es te quiero", an album in both Spanish and Catalan.

== Discography ==
Albums

- Beginning (2012)
- Inblack (Volume One) (2016)
- 1016 (2018)
- 1997 (2021)
- T'estimo es te quiero (2025)

== Awards and nominations ==
Year	Organization	Category	Nominee/work	Result	Ref.
2016	Festival Cara•B	Audience Award	"She Looks So Beautiful"	Won	
2018	Premis Ciutat del Prat	Amics del Prat	Alfred García	Won	
2019	Premis Enderrock	Best New Artist	Alfred García	Nominated	
2019	Premis Enderrock	Best Non-Catalan Language Artist	Alfred García	Nominated	
2019	Premis Enderrock	Best Singer-Songwriter Album	1016	Nominated	
2019	Premis Enderrock	Best Singer-Songwriter Song	"Et vull veure"	Won	
2019	LOS40 Music Awards	Del 40 al 1 Artist Award	Alfred García	Nominated	
2019	Soundie Music Video Awards	Best Music Video from a Catalan Artist	"Wonder"	Won	
2020	Premios Odeón	Best New Artist	Alfred García	Nominated	

Preceded by Manel Navarro with "Do It for Your Lover"	Spain in the Eurovision Song Contest; 2018 (with Amaia Romero)	Succeeded by Miki Núñez with "La venda"
