= Núria Graham =

Spanish singer and songwriter (born 1996)

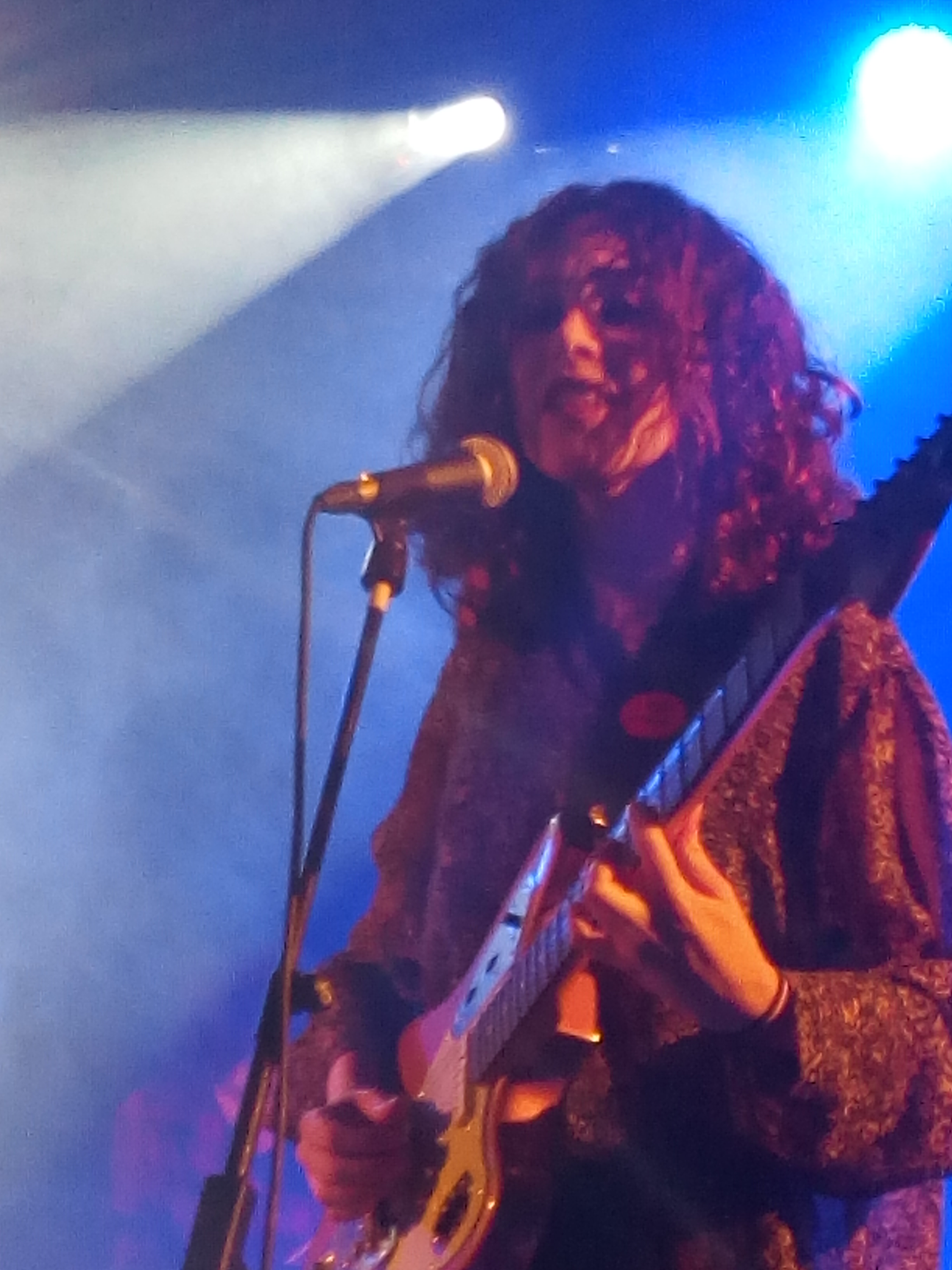
Núria Graham performing in stage

Núria Graham (born 25 June 1996 in Vic, Catalonia, Spain) is a Catalan singer and songwriter who sings primarily in English. She is of Irish and Catalan descent. Her first album, Bird Eyes (2015), layers her voice and electric guitar over electronic or acoustic backgrounds with sensual lyrics.

== Discography ==
- First Tracks, Halley Records (2013)
- Bird Eyes, El Segell del Primavera (2015)
- In The Cave ep, El Segell del Primavera (2016)
- Does It Ring A Bell?, El Segell Del Primavera (2017)
- Marjorie, Primavera Labels (2020)
- Cyclamen, New Deal/Primavera (2023)
