= Amaia (singer) =

Spanish singer and pianist (born 1999)

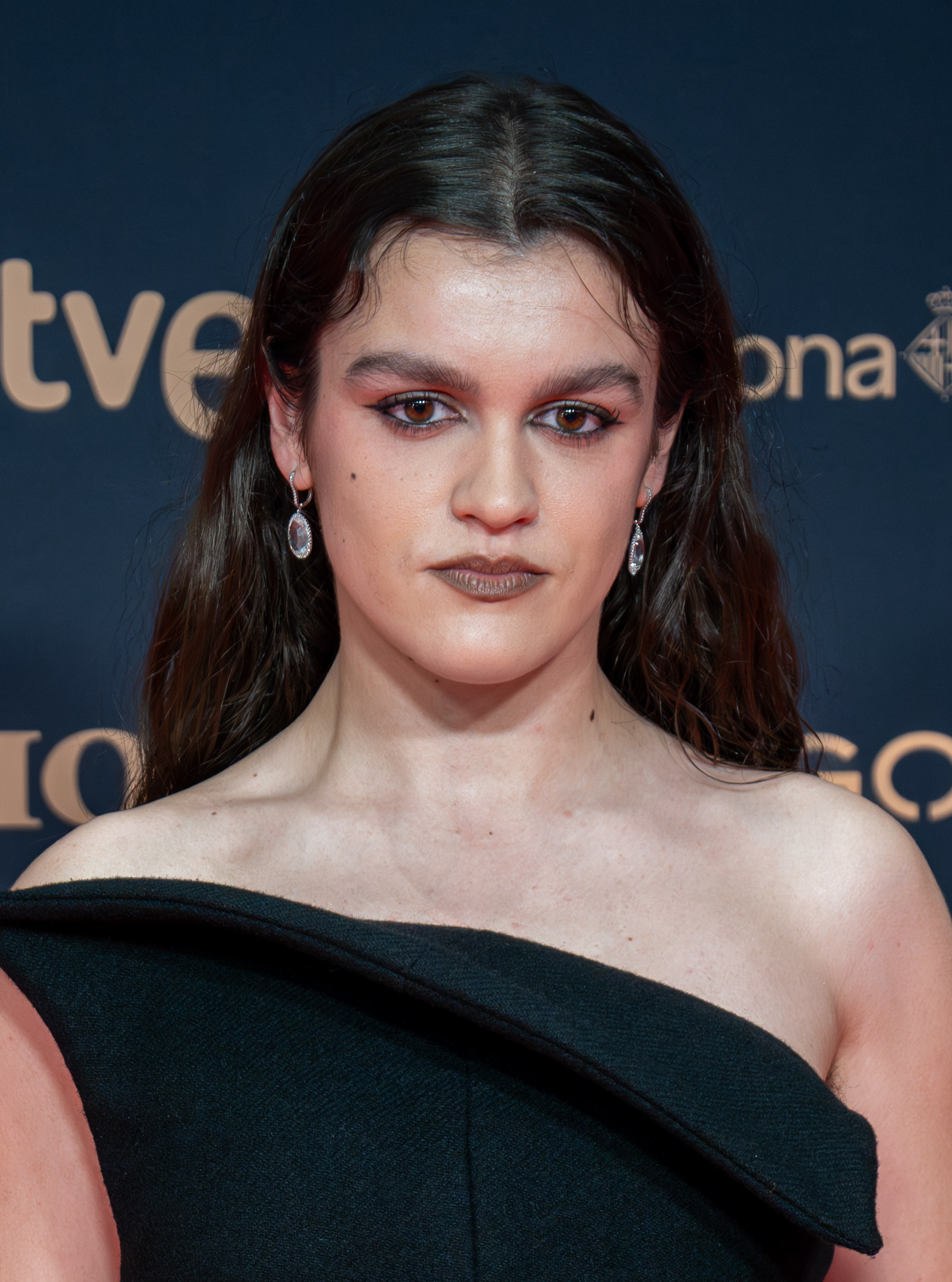
- Amaia in 2026
- Born: Amaia Romero Arbizu; 3 January 1999 (age 27); Pamplona, Navarre, Spain
- Other name: Amaia de España
- Education: Conservatori Superior de Música del Liceu
- Occupations: Singer; pianist; songwriter; actress
- Years active: 2010–present
- Musical career
- Genres: Pop; sunshine pop; chill-out
- Instruments: Vocals; piano; guitar; ukulele
- Labels: Universal Music; Primavera Labels

Amaia Romero Arbizu (born 3 January 1999), known mononymously as Amaia, is a Spanish singer-songwriter, pianist and actress. After participating in many talent shows, she gained national recognition after winning series nine of musical television contest Operación Triunfo, later representing Spain alongside fellow competitor Alfred García at the Eurovision Song Contest 2018 with "Tu canción". Romero later signed with Universal Music and released her debut album Pero No Pasa Nada in 2019.

== Early life ==
Romero was born on 3 January 1999 in Pamplona, Navarre.

Daughter to Ángel Romero and Javiera Arbizu, Amaia belongs to a family of musicians. Her uncle, Joaquín Romero, was the manager of the Orfeón Pamplonés concert choir from 2008 until 2016, as well as the Pablo Sarasate Orchestra for two years. It was her uncle who discovered that, even as a child, Amaia had absolute pitch.

On her mother's side, Amaia is the niece of Carmen Arbizu, professor of singing at the Conservatorio Superior de Música de Navarra since 1990. Amaia started studying for a degree in piano at this conservatory and completed her musical studies at the Conservatori Superior de Música del Liceu, in Barcelona, in 2019.

== Career ==
=== 2010–2016: Beginnings ===
Romero debuted in television in 2009 when she appeared on TVE's television news playing the piano at age ten as part of a children talent contest, where she ended third in her instrument's category. Romero participated in the televised talent show Cántame Una Canción on Telecinco, where she sang alongside David Civera and Sergio Rivero a year later. In 2011, she was the winner of a scholarship to Rock Camp 2011, and participated in the camp in 2011 and 2012. In 2012, she took part in series one of the talent show El Número Uno. She was eliminated in week six of the series. The jury in the show was made up of David Bustamante, Ana Torroja, Miguel Bosé, Natalia Jiménez and Mónica Naranjo. Romero and Naranjo would meet again on series nine of Operación Triunfo, as Naranjo went on to be part of the jury. In 2012 she also met Felipe VI and Letizia Ortiz, who would become King and Queen consort of Spain. They both told Amaia that she "had a future" after they saw her perform in Pamplona with the Pablo Sarasate Orchestra.

In 2016, Amaia collaborated with the Navarrese band Lemon y Tal on the song "Cicatrices de mi realidad".

=== 2017–2018: Operación Triunfo and Eurovision ===
In July 2017, Amaia auditioned in Bilbao for the revival series of the reality television music competition Operación Triunfo. On 23 October 2017, she was selected to enter the show's "academy" on the season premiere. After performing David Bowie's "Starman", Amaia was not selected by the show's jury, but was saved by the academy's staff of teachers instead. In January 2018, Amaia became a finalist in the competition after being awarded a perfect score of 40 points from the jury –the highest score in the history of the competition–. Distinguished for her naivety, diverse musical taste and humor, she was proclaimed the winner of the series with 46% of the final votes from the public. After her win, she signed a pre-contract with Universal Music. Romero consequently co-headlined an indoor arena tour with her fifteen talent show companions during 2018. The tour (named OT 2017 en concierto) began on 3 March 2018 at the Palau Sant Jordi and ended ibid on 28 December of that same year, comprising 23 concerts. It was attended by 300,000 people.

Additionally, due to being one of the final five finalists on Operación Triunfo, Amaia was a candidate to represent Spain in the Eurovision Song Contest 2018. For the special Eurovision selection show that was held on 29 January 2018, she was allocated three songs: "Camina", which she performed as part of a group made up of the five finalists; "Al Cantar", which she performed solo; and "Tu canción", composed by Raul Gómez and Sylvia Santoro, which she sang as a duet with her then-boyfriend Alfred García. The latter was selected with 43% of the public vote, representing the country in the 2018 contest, held in Lisbon, Portugal. Amaia and Alfred were the second to perform at the Eurovision final. They placed twenty-third out of the 26 participating countries with 61 points: 43 from the professional juries and 18 from the televote. After being asked about the result she stated "its a shit, but we are happy".

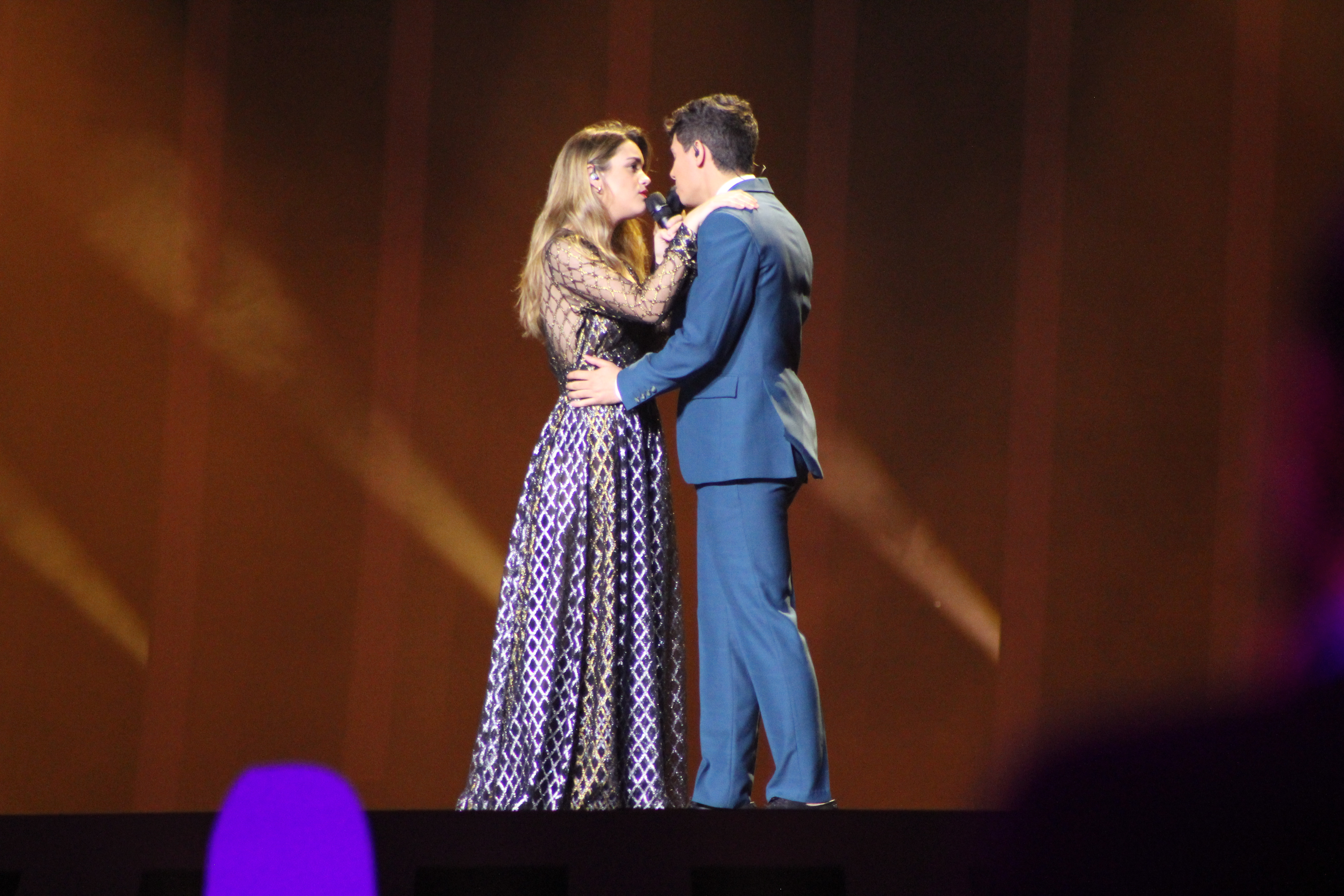
Amaia & Alfred rehearsing at the Eurovision Song Contest 2018 stage.

=== 2018–2020: Pero No Pasa Nada ===
Amaia made her first steps as a solo artist in mid-2018. She relocated to the Eixample district in Barcelona and there she completed her degree in classical piano in 2019 at the Conservatori Superior de Música del Liceu. Amaia also toured Spain with The Free Fall Band throughout 2018, visiting Madrid, Pamplona, Sitges and the Primavera Sound music festival. The setlist included traditional Spanish pop songs as well as other songs in indie pop genre. In September 2018, she sang Ivor Cutler's "Women of the World" with U2 at their concert in Madrid. She also began shaping her upcoming studio album, which was recorded between New York City, Barcelona and Buenos Aires. On 18 December 2018, Romero released a 90-second promotional single titled "Un Nuevo Lugar", which was produced by Raül Refree. The song peaked at 37 on the PROMUSICAE sales chart. A month before the promotional single's release Spanish rock band Carolina Durante released a collaboration with Amaia titled "Perdona (Ahora Sí Que Sí)".

In January 2019, Amaia announced that she would go on a promotional festival tour in the summertime. The tour began in Murcia in May and concluded in August in Peñíscola. After working with Argentine singer-songwriter Santiago Motorizado throughout 2019, Romero finished recording her debut album Pero No Pasa Nada. Its lead single "El Relámpago" was released on digital platforms in May 2019, peaking at number 24 on the PROMUSICAE chart and staying on the list for over three weeks. A limited hard CD and LP version was released alongside the promotional single "Nadie Podría Hacerlo" for Record Store Day. The album spawned other three singles: "Quedará en Nuestra Mente", "Quiero Que Vengas" and "Nuevo Verano". Pero No Pasa Nada saw light on 20 September 2019, topping the Spanish albums chart in its debut week despite receiving mixed reviews. Romero's first solo concert tour, the Pero No Pasa Nada Tour, began in October and concluded in September 2021 after being partially canceled due to the COVID-19 pandemic.

The singer parallelly participated in the third season of Spanish Netflix series Paquita Salas covering the jota "Tan Pequeñica Y Sincera" by Marisol, which premiered on Spotify on 19 September. She also sang the closure song for the thriller film Legado en los huesos, "Luz y Sombra". In January 2020, Amaia took part in a tribute to Marisol at the 34th Goya Awards, performing "Canción de Marisol" to critical acclaim. She later took part on the soundtrack of the television series Veneno, where she covered "Pongamos Que Hablo de Madrid" as well as "The House of the Rising Sun". In August 2020, two self-written songs "Cosas Interesantes Para Decir" and "La Victoria" were released online as promotional singles recorded in a lo-fi studio in Barcelona to close this musical era.

On 1 May 2020 Amazon Prime Video premiered Una Vuelta Al Sol, a documentary film that shows the making of the album as well as a brief look into the tour. The documentary was nominated for Best Long Form Music Video at the 2020 Latin Grammy Awards.

=== 2021–2023: Cuando No Sé Quién Soy ===
In October 2020, Amaia collaborated with Alizzz on his song "El Encuentro", which met great commercial success and won the Premio MIN for Best Urban Recording. Alizzz would serve as the key producer for the singer's upcoming studio album Cuando No Sé Quién Soy, whose lead single "Yo Invito" was released a year later to critical and popular acclaim. Amaia was later featured on the respective projects of Los Hermanos Hubero and Mikel Erentxun. In November 2021, "Quiero Pero No" featuring vocals by Spanish singer Rojuu, was released as the album's second single. "Yamaguchi", a folk song about childhood and growing up that references the Pamplona park and the Japanese city of the same name, was released in January 2022 as its third single. The singer released "Bienvenidos al Show" two months later to general acclaim. "La Canción Que No Quiero Cantarte", featuring longtime friend and singer Aitana, was released on 10 May. The singer's second studio album was released on 13 May and debuted at number two on the Spanish Albums Chart. On 3 January 2022 Amaia released the single "Yamaguchi". She chose her birthday to pay tribute to her favorite place, Yamaguchi Park, in her hometown of Pamplona, in the form of a modern jota mixing melodic pop.

=== 2024–present: acting debut and Si Abro los Ojos No Es Real ===
In 2023, Amaia debuted as an actress with a role in the drama television series La mesías. She earned a nomination for Best Supporting Actress in a TV Series for the 11th Feroz Awards. For her film debut as an actress, she worked in Bitter Christmas, set for a March 2026 release.

== Discography ==
Studio Albums

- Pero No Pasa Nada (2019)
- Cuando No Sé Quién Soy (2022)
- Si Abro los Ojos No Es Real (2025)

Singles

- "Tu canción" (2018) (with Alfred García)
- "Perdona (Ahora Sí Que Sí)" (2018) (with Carolina Durante)
- "El Relámpago" (2019)
- "Quedará en Nuestra Mente" (2019)
- "Quiero Que Vengas" (2019)
- "El Encuentro" (2020) (with Alizzz)
- "Yo Invito" (2021)
- "Quiero Pero No" (2021) (with Rojuu)
- "Yamaguchi" (2022)
- "Bienvenidos al Show" (2022)
- "La Canción Que No Quiero Cantarte" (2022) (with Aitana)
- "Así Bailaba" (2022) (with Rigoberta Bandini)
- "Sexo en la Playa" (2023) (with Alizzz)
- "Nanai" (2024)
- "Tocotó" (2024)
- "M.A.P.S." (2025)

Promotional singles

- "Un Nuevo Lugar" (2018)
- "Nadie Podría Hacerlo" (2019)
- "Cosas Interesantes Para Decir" / "La Victoria" (2020)
- "Fiebre" (Bad Gyal cover) (2023)
- "Tengo Un Pensamiento" (2024)

== Filmography ==
=== Film ===
Year	Film	Notes
2019	Legado en los Huesos	Soundtrack
2020	Una Vuelta al Sol	Documentary film
2026	Bitter Christmas	Tragicomedy; as herself

=== Television ===
Year	Show	Notes
2010	Cántame una canción	Contestant
2012	El Número Uno	Contestant
2017-2018	Operación Triunfo	Contestant
2018	Eurovision Song Contest 2018	Contestant
2019	33rd Goya Awards	Performer
2019	Paquita Salas	Soundtrack
2020	34th Goya Awards	Performer
2020	Veneno	Soundtrack
2021	Pongamos Que Hablo de Camela	Performer
2021	Porta Ferrada	Guest appearance
2021	Una Navidad con Samantha Hudson	Guest appearance
2023	That's My Jam España	1 episode
2023	La Mesías	Supporting actress

== Tour ==
Headlining

- Pero No Pasa Nada (2019-2020)
- Conciertos Cuando No Sé Quién Soy (2022-2023)
- Si Abro Los Ojos No Es Real/Amaia Arenas (2025-2026)

Co-headlining

- OT 2017 en concierto (2018) (with Operación Triunfo 2017)
- Amaia & The Free Fall Band (2018)

== Awards and nominations ==
Year	Organization	Category	Nominee/work	Result	Ref.
2020	Premios Odeón	Best Female Artist	Amaia	Nominated	
2020	Latin Grammy Awards	Best Long Form Music Video	"Una Vuelta al Sol"	Nominated	
2021	Premios MIN	Song of the Year	"El Encuentro" (with Alizzz)	Nominated	
2021	Premios MIN	Best Urban Recording	"El Encuentro" (with Alizzz)	Won	
2021	Premios MIN	Best Production in a Song	"El Encuentro" (with Alizzz)	Nominated	
2021	Premios MIN	Best Music Video	"El Encuentro" (with Alizzz)	Nominated	
2024	Feroz Awards	Best Supporting Actress in a Series	La Mesías	Nominated	
2024	Premios de la Academia de Música	Best Alternative Song	"Fiebre"	Pending	
2026	Berlin Music Video Awards	Best VFX	"Aralar"	Nominated	

Awards and achievements
Preceded by Manel Navarro with "Do It for Your Lover"	Spain in the Eurovision Song Contest; 2018 (with Alfred García)	Succeeded by Miki Núñez with "La venda"
Preceded by Nahuel Sachak	Operación Triunfo winner Series 9	Succeeded by Famous Oberogo
