= Do It for Your Lover =

2017 song by Manel Navarro

Single by Manel Navarro

from the EP Do It for Your Lover
- Released: 13 January 2017
- Recorded: 2016
- Genre: Pop; reggae fusion
- Length: 3:24
- Label: Sony Music Spain
- Songwriters: Manel Navarro; Antonio Rayo "Rayito"
- Producer: Antonio Rayo "Rayito"

Manel Navarro singles chronology
"Candle" (2016)	"Do It for Your Lover" (2017)	"Keep On Falling" (2017)

Music video
- "Do It for Your Lover" on YouTube

Eurovision Song Contest 2017 entry
- Country: Spain
- Artist: Manel Navarro
- Languages: English; Spanish
- Composers: Manel Navarro; Antonio Rayo "Rayito"
- Lyricists: Manel Navarro; Antonio Rayo "Rayito"

Finals performance
- Final result: 26th
- Final points: 5

Entry chronology
- ◄ "Say Yay!" (2016)
- "Tu canción" (2018) ►

Official performance video
- "Do It for Your Lover" (final) on YouTube

"Do It for Your Lover" is a song performed by Spanish singer Manel Navarro and written by himself together with Antonio Rayo "Rayito". The song was released as a digital download on 13 January 2017 through Sony Music Spain. It represented Spain in the Eurovision Song Contest 2017, placing twenty-sixth.

== Background ==
=== Conception ===
"Do It for Your Lover" was written by Manel Navarro and Antonio Rayo "Rayito", and recorded by Navarro himself.

=== Selection ===
On 12 January 2017, Radiotelevisión Española (RTVE) confirmed "Do It for Your Lover" performed by Navarro to be one of the six finalists songs competing in Objetivo Eurovisión 2017, their national selection for the 62nd edition of the Eurovision Song Contest. On 11 February 2017, the national final was held on La 1 of Televisión Española, and "Do It for Your Lover" finished first with the juries and third with the Spanish public, in a tie with "Contigo" by Mirela. The jury then broke the tie in Navarro's favour, and he was declared the winner, so "Do It for Your Lover" became the Spanish entry for Eurovision.

=== Music video ===
The official video of the song, directed by Mauri D. Galiano, was filmed in February 2017 on the north coast of Tenerife, Canary Islands. The video premiered on Navarro's YouTube Vevo channel on 9 March 2017.

=== Promotion ===
On 18 February, Navarro performed the song at the Ukrainian national final as a special guest during the third semi-final. On 25 February, he performed the song on talk show ¡Qué tiempo tan feliz!, aired on Telecinco. On 5 March, he also performed as a guest performer during the Romanian national final. On 2 April, he performed the song during the London Eurovision Party, which was held at the Café de Paris venue in London, United Kingdom. On 5 April, he performed at the Israel Calling event in Tel Aviv, Israel. Navarro also performed the song during the 2017 Eurovision in Concert, the largest gathering of Eurovision artists outside of Eurovision itself, held in the Melkweg, a popular music venue in Amsterdam, the Netherlands on 8 April. On 15 April, he performed during the Eurovision-Spain Pre-Party event which was held at the Sala La Riviera venue in Madrid.

=== Eurovision ===
On 13 May 2017, the Eurovision Song Contest grand final was held at the International Exhibition Centre in Kyiv hosted by the Public Broadcasting Company of Ukraine (UA:PBC), and broadcast live throughout the continent. As Spain is a member of the "Big Five", he had automatically advanced to the final. Navarro performed "Do It for Your Lover" sixteenth on the night following Greece's "This Is Love" by Demy and preceding Norway's "Grab the Moment" by Jowst. Hans Pannecoucke was the staging director for his performance. In the climax of the song, Navarro went notoriously off-key, and his bad result was partly attributed to it.

At the close of voting, "Do It for Your Lover" obtained no points from the professional juries and only five from the public televote (all from Portugal), finishing in twenty-sixth and last place.

== Track listing ==
Digital download
No.	Title	Length
1.	"Do It for Your Lover"	3:24

EP
No.	Title	Length
1.	"Do It for Your Lover"	3:24
2.	"Candle"	3:21
3.	"If I Go" (Inedita)	3:38
4.	"Do It for Your Lover" (Eurovision 2017)	3:02
5.	"Do It for Your Lover" (acoustic version)	2:35
6.	"Do It for Your Lover" (urban remix) (featuring Danny Romero)	3:18
7.	"Do It for Your Lover" (live studio session)	2:38

== Charts ==
Chart (2017)	Peak position
Spain (PROMUSICAE)	75
Sweden Heatseeker (Sverigetopplistan)	16

== Release history ==
Region	Date	Format	Label
Worldwide	13 January 2017	Digital download	Sony Music Spain
