= Tu canción =

2018 song by Amaia Romero and Alfred García

Single by Amaia y Alfred
- Language: Spanish
- Released: 28 January 2018; 12 March 2018 (final version)
- Genre: Pop
- Length: 3:00
- Label: Universal Music Spain
- Songwriters: Raúl Gómez; Sylvia Santoro
- Producer: Pablo Cebrián

Amaia singles chronology
"Tu canción" (2018)	"Perdona (Ahora sí que sí)" (2018)

Alfred singles chronology
"Tu canción" (2018)	"De la Tierra hasta Marte" (2018)

Music video
- "Tu canción" on YouTube

Eurovision Song Contest 2018 entry
- Country: Spain
- Artists: Amaia Romero; Alfred García
- As: Amaia y Alfred
- Language: Spanish
- Composers: Raúl Gómez; Sylvia Santoro
- Lyricists: Raúl Gómez; Sylvia Santoro

Finals performance
- Final result: 23rd
- Final points: 61

Entry chronology
- ◄ "Do It for Your Lover" (2017)
- "La venda" (2019) ►

Official performance video
- "Tu canción" (Final) on YouTube

"Tu canción" (transl. Your song) is a song recorded by Spanish singers Amaia Romero and Alfred García –credited as Amaia y Alfred–, written and composed by Raúl Gómez and Sylvia Santoro. The song was released as a digital download on 28 January 2018 through Universal Music Spain. It represented Spain in the Eurovision Song Contest 2018 in Lisbon, Portugal. It finished in twenty-third place.

An English-language version, "Your Song", was released as a digital download on 27 April 2018. The lyrics were adapted into English by Paula Rojo.

== Background ==
=== Conception ===
"Tu canción" was written and composed by Raúl Gómez and Sylvia Santoro.

=== Selection ===
On 4 December 2017, Radioelevisión Española (RTVE) confirmed that they would use the music reality program Operación Triunfo to select their act for the 63rd edition of the Eurovision Song Contest. It was later revealed on 20 December that the final five singers of the program's ninth series would perform in "Gala Eurovisión", which would be where the Spanish public would choose both the song and its performers for Eurovision. The nine competing songs were unveiled on 23 January 2018. Gala Eurovisión was held on 29 January where Alfred y Amaia performed "Tu canción" live for the first time. The song was one of the top three songs in the first round of voting, qualifying to the second round where it won with 43% of the vote becoming the Spanish entrant for Eurovision.

=== Promotion ===
On 13 February, they performed the song again on Gala OT Fiesta of Operación Triunfo 2017. On 26 February, they performed an acoustic version on talk show El Hormiguero on Antena 3. On 11 March, they performed the acoustic version on talk show Viva la vida on Telecinco. Alfred & Amaia performed the song on the Premios Dial awards show at the Auditorio de Tenerife in Santa Cruz, aired live on Divinity on 15 March. On 24 March, they performed the song on the La noche de Cadena 100 charity concert at the WiZink Center in Madrid, aired live on Divinity. On 25 March, they performed as guests on competitive dance reality television series Fama, ¡a bailar!, aired on #0.

On 5 April, they performed during the London Eurovision Party, which was held at the Café de Paris venue in London, United Kingdom. They also performed during the Israel Calling event which was held at Rabin Square in Tel Aviv, Israel on 10 April. On 14 April, Alfred & Amaia performed during the Eurovision in Concert event which was held at the AFAS Live venue in Amsterdam, Netherlands. On 21 April, they performed the song during the Eurovision-Spain Pre-Party event which will was held at the Sala La Riviera venue in Madrid. On 27 April, they performed the English version "Your Song" for the first time during the concert event Amaia, Alfred y amigos.

=== Eurovision ===
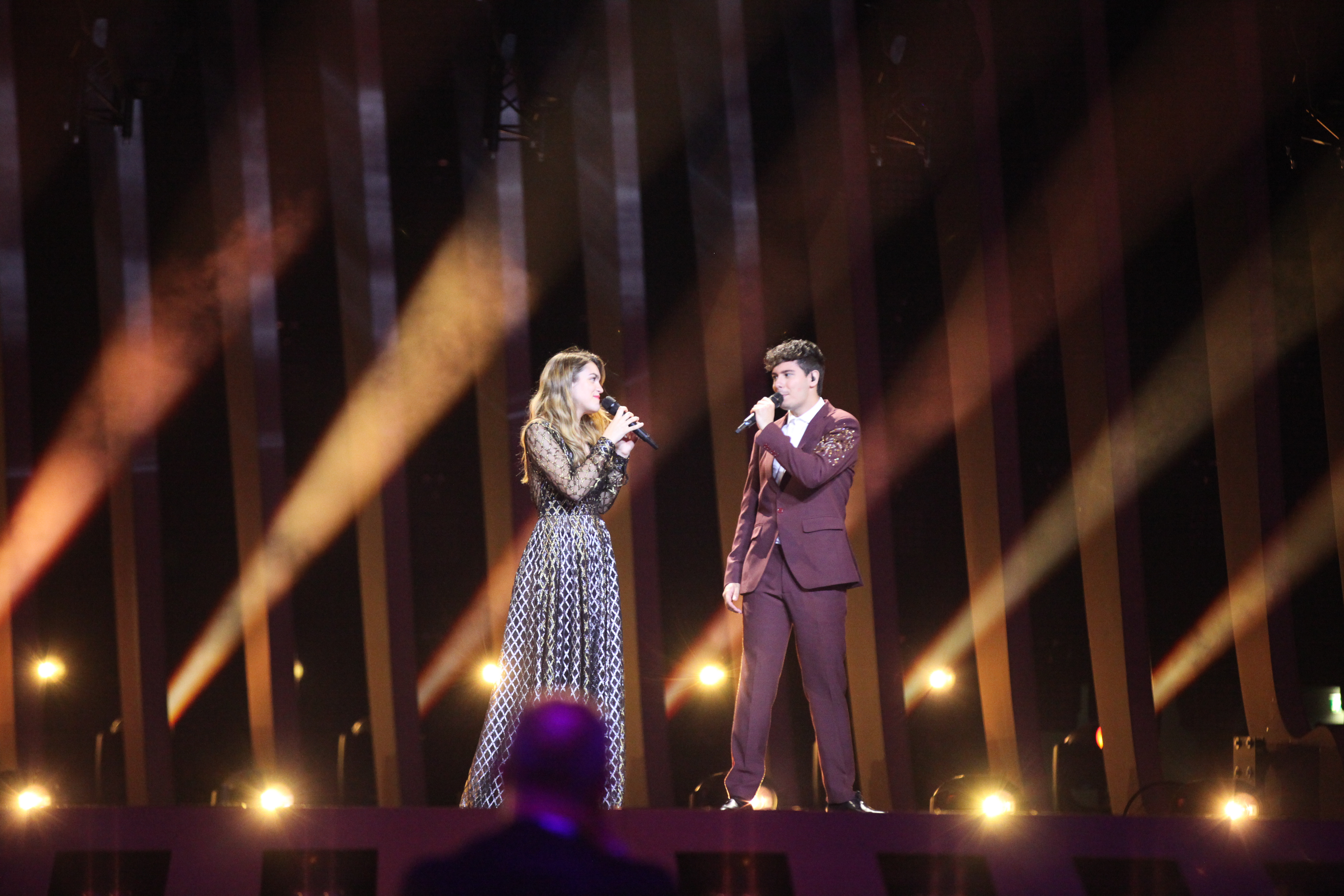
Amaia y Alfred performing "Tu canción" in Eurovision.

On 12 May 2018, the final of the Eurovision Song Contest was held at the Lisbon Arena in Lisbon hosted by Rádio e Televisão de Portugal (RTP) and broadcast live throughout the continent and abroad. As Spain is a member of the "Big Five", the song automatically advanced to the final. Amaia y Alfred performed "Tu canción" second on the evening. At the end of voting, it placed twenty-third out of the twenty-six participating countries with 61 points: 43 from the professional juries and 18 from the televote.

== Music video ==
The official video of the song, directed by Gus Carballo, was filmed in February 2018 at studio in Madrid. The video premiered on 9 March 2018 on a special prime time broadcast on La 1, hosted by Roberto Leal.

== Track listing ==
Digital download
No.	Title	Length
1.	"Tu canción"	3:00

Digital download - English version
No.	Title	Length
1.	"Your Song"	3:01

== Charts ==
=== Weekly charts ===
Weekly chart performance for "Tu canción"
Chart (2018)	Peak position
Spain (PROMUSICAE)	3

=== Year-end charts ===
2018 year-end chart performance for "Tu canción"
Chart (2018)	Position
Spain (PROMUSICAE)	75

== Certifications ==
Sale certifications for "Tu canción"
Region	Certification	Certified units/sales
Spain (Promusicae)	Platinum	40,000^{‡}
^{‡} Sales+streaming figures based on certification alone.

== Release history ==
Release dates for "Tu canción"
Region	Date	Format	Version	Label
Worldwide	28 January 2018	Digital download	Original	Universal Music Spain
Worldwide	12 March 2018	Digital download	Revamped	Universal Music Spain
Spain	23 March 2018	CD single	Revamped	Universal Music Spain
Worldwide	27 April 2018	Digital download	English version	Universal Music Spain
