= Chica Sobresalto =

Spanish singer and songwriter (born 1994)

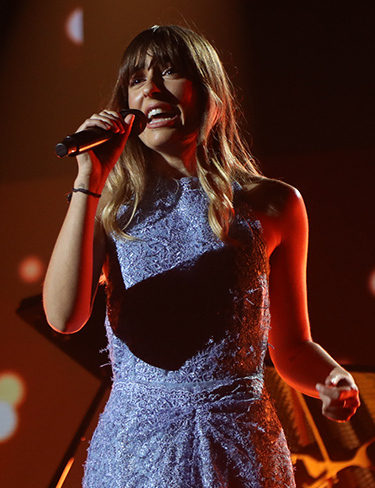

Background information
- Born: Maialen Gurbindo López; 13 May 1994 (age 32); Villava – Atarrabia, Navarre, Spain
- Genres: Alternative rock; pop rock
- Years active: 2017–present
- Label: El Dromedario Records

Maialen Gurbindo López (born 13 May 1994), known professionally as Chica Sobresalto, is a Spanish singer and songwriter. She has released four studio albums. The first was self-produced and the following ones were produced by El Dromedario Records.

Sobresalto rose to prominence when she participated in the eleventh series of Operación Triunfo in 2020, finishing in sixth place. She also participated in Benidorm Fest 2025 with the song "Mala feminista".

== Early life and education ==
Born in Villava – Atarrabia, Gurbindo studied music at the Orfeón Pamplonés Juvenil and the Hilarion Eslava public music school. She also sang in 3indarrok Elektrotxaranga, Biluzik, and a gospel choir.

== Musical career ==
=== 2017–2020: Sobresalto ===
In 2017, Gurbindo founded the musical project Chica Sobresalto with herself on vocals, Ander Arlegi (bass), Ibai Sanz (guitar), Gorka Cía (guitar), and Aritz Legarrea (drums), joined by Leire Celestino on piano. In October 2017, Sobresalto's first album, Sobresalto, was released, and a month later, she made headlines after winning the Navarra Young Art Meetings organized by the Institute of Sport and Youth. Her stage name is a reference from the thought "life is not a sigh, it is a startle," through which she is represented as a heroine who does the things that Sobresalto is embarrassed to do.

=== 2020: Operación Triunfo ===
On 12 January 2020, Gurbindo became known when she entered the eleventh series of Operación Triunfo, gaining admission to the show with her performance of "Nuestra canción." In the show's second gala, she sang Ken Zazpi's song "Ilargia" alongside Anne Lukin, which was the first song sung in Basque on the show. She narrowly missed the finals, being eliminated in the 12th gala, finishing in sixth place. During her time at Operación Triunfo, the single "Oxitocina" was released, which was one of the first singles released from that edition. The vocals for the song were recorded inside the academy, while the group produced the song in the rehearsal room with Hans Krüger at the helm.

=== 2020–2022: Sinapsis and first collaborations ===
On 13 November 2020, "Fusión del núcleo" was released, which is the second single (first after leaving Operación Triunfo) from Sobresalto's second album. On 8 January 2021, Sobresalto released her third single with the collaboration of singer Zahara called "Adrenalina". The music videos for both songs were directed by the artist Lyona, the second being a continuation of the story started in the first. On 13 April 2021, she released "Selección natural", the last single from her second album and whose music video was also directed by Lyona. With the release of the single, she announced the first concerts to present her album. On 25 April 2021, she made her first collaboration singing with Veintiuno the song "Nudes".

Sobresalto's second album, entitled Sinapsis, was released on 14 May 2021. It was recorded with producers Santos and Fluren at Blind Records in Barcelona. The album became a sales success, reaching number 1 in Spain, both on the album and vinyl charts. On 16 July 2021, she released the song "Inconstantes Vitales" on digital platforms, which was hidden in the physical edition of the album Sinapsis.

The EP Retales was released on 13 August 2021, which consists of four tracks. Three tracks function as B-sides to the singles that appear on Sinapsis, which are personal songs performed in acoustic format and included in the physical editions of the singles from her album Sinapsis (2021). The EP's bonus track is "Basandere," a promotional song in Spanish and Basque dedicated to Navarre, the land of Gurbindo, which was released on the occasion of Navarre Day at the FITUR 2021 International Tourism Fair.

On 14 September 2021, the Bailando Raro Tour was announced, which toured 7 Spanish cities, in addition to the release of the single "Bailando Raro," which went on sale on 13 October 2021. Olaia Inziarte joined the band on this tour on piano and backing vocals, as Leire Celestino had to leave the project for personal reasons. During 2021, she also collaborated on the RTVE Play documentary about Susana Estrada, entitled Susana y el sexo, singing the main track, a cover of the song "¡Gózame ya!" The video clip mixes real images of Susana Estrada and images of Maialen representing her.

On 14 March 2022, during World Endometriosis Day, Sobresalto presented a new version of the song "Progesterona" with Beth, who suffers from endometriosis. It is the last single from the album and with which she closed the Sinapsis era. At the end of 2022, she returned the collaboration with Beth on the song "One of Us" from the album Natural Women.

=== 2022–2024: Oráculo ===
The third studio album Oráculo was announced on 9 November 2022, coinciding with the release of the first single, "La estrella." Before the album's release, four more singles were released. On 19 January 2022, "La Torre" was released. On 22 March 2022, Veintiuno returned the collaboration with the song "Poquita cosa." Also just before the release of Oráculo, the singles "Hogar" and "La Monogamia" were released with Celia Becks.

On 12 May 2023, the album Oráculo was released, which was again produced by Santos & Fluren and published by Dromedario Records. For this album, Marta Iricibar replaced Olaia Inziarte on piano and Ibai Sanz left the band. To support the album Oráculo, Chica Sobresalto had two promotional tours. On 8 February 2023, before the album's release, a small tour called Poquita cosa was announced, which toured 5 cities in Spain, including participation in 2 festivals in the summer. On 14 February 2024, the Pultón tour was announced, which toured the entire country in almost twenty concerts. Several of the tour's concerts appeared on the program Girando por salas, in which Chica Sobresalto was one of the 22 selected.

On 13 August 2023, the EP Retales II was released, which serves as the closing of the Oráculo phase and includes 4 unrecorded songs from the album. During the Oráculo period, Sobresalto participated in the song "Ponte en mi lugar", organized by the Músicas+Músicas por el Día de la Mujer". She released a new song called "Tu nirvana" and a new version of "Navegantes" called "Navegantes (en pendura)". She also collaborated with Rocío Saiz on the song "Guapa y lista", with Bruno Alves on the song "Loto", with Fran Perea doing a new version of the song "Dame una alegría", with Alex Wall on the song "Mi cabeza" and with Celia Becks on the song "Crisis".

On 25 October 2024, Sobresalto was the opening act for Rozalén's concert at the Navarra Arena in Pamplona.

=== 2024–present: Benidorm Fest 2025 and Información sísmica ===
On 12 November 2024, Sobresalto was announced as one of the 16 contestants for Benidorm Fest 2025. The song, titled "Mala feminista," was self-written. The song was released on all platforms on 18 December 2024. Although the song was well received on digital platforms, she was eliminated in the first semifinal of the contest without a chance of making it to the final.

On 13 February 2025, she released Bella Rareza and on April 10, Virgen de la luz, the second and third singles from Sobresalto's fourth album and the two songs that were rejected for Benidorm Fest 2025.

On 23 September 2025, Sobresalto announced via her social media that the title of her fourth studio album would be Información sísmica, which was released on 14 November.

== Other works ==
=== Writing ===
In 2024, Gurbindo published her first book, The Art of Being Mediocre. In it, she talks about all the Maialens that live inside her. In this sincere ode to mediocrity, Gurbindo explains that, as her friend Txapa also says, "when you share something with someone, it weighs half as much." "The art of being mediocre is the skill of accepting all your oddities. It's not about loving yourself with everything. It's about loving yourself despite everything."

=== Podcast ===
On 5 June 2023, Gurbindo launched the podcast Triunfitas con traumitas on Podimo alongside fellow Operación Triunfo 2020 contestant Samantha Gilabert. It is an interview program co-hosted and co-directed by Gilabert and Gurbindo, which has featured, among others, former colleagues from Operación Triunfo, contestants from other editions of Operación Triunfo and even Tinet Rubira, who is the director of Gestmusic Endemol and one of the producers of Operación Triunfo.

== Band members ==
Current

- Chica Sobresalto: vocals and guitar (2017–present)
- Aritz Legarrea: drums (2017–present)
- Ander Arlegi (Txapa): bass guitar (2017–present)
- Gorka Cía: guitar (2017–present)
- Marta Iricibar: keyboard and choirs (2022–present)

Former

- Leire Celestino: piano and choirs (2017–2021)
- Ibai Sanz (2017–2022)
- Olaia Inziarte (2021–2022)

== Discography ==
=== Studio albums ===
List of studio albums, with selected details and chart positions
Title	Details	Peak chart positions
Title	Details	SPA
Sobresalto	Released: October 2017; Label: El Dromedario Records; Formats: CD, digital download, streaming,	
Sinapsis	Released: 14 May 2021; Label: El Dromedario Records; Formats: CD, digital download, streaming, vinyl	1
Oraculo	Released: 12 May 2023; Label: El Dromedario Records; Formats: CD, digital download, streaming, vinyl, cassette	9
Información sísmica	Released: 14 November 2025; Label: El Dromedario Records; Formats: CD, digital download, streaming, vinyl, cassette	38

=== EP ===
Title	Details
Retales	Released: 13 August 2021; Label: El Dromedario Records; Format: Digital download
Retales II	Released: 15 December 2023; Label: El Dromedario Records; Format: Digital download

=== Singles ===
==== As featured artist ====
Title	Year	Album
"Oxitocina"	2020	Sinapsis
"Fusión del núcleo"	2020	Sinapsis
"Adrenalina" (featuring Zahara)	2021	Sinapsis
"Selección natural"	2021	Sinapsis
"Inconstantes vitales"	2021	Non-album singles
"¡Gózame ya!"	2021	Non-album singles
"Bailando raro"	2021	Non-album singles
"Progresterona" (featuring Beth)	2022	Como reivindicación el 14 de marzo, día de la Endometriosis.
"La estrella"	2022	Oráculo
"La torre"	2023	Oráculo
"Poquita cosa" (featuring Veintiuno)	2023	Oráculo
"El hogar"	2023	Oráculo
"La monogamio"	2023	Oráculo
"El tiempo bala"	2023	Retales II
"Plutón"	2023	Retales II
"Sertralina"	2023	Retales II
"Tu nirvana"	2024	Non-album singles
"Navegantes (en pendura)	2024	Non-album singles
"Mala feminista"	2024	Benidorm Fest 2025
"Bella rareza"	2025	Non-album singles

==== As featured artist and collaborations ====
Title	Year	Album
"Los nuevos rockeros" with Gussy	2018	Horizontes
"La luna nunca brilla sola" with Gussy	2019	Canciones cortas para viajes largos
"Zalantza eta egia" with Xabi Bandini	2020	Non-album singles
"Nudes" with Veintiuno	2021	Corazonada
"Deseo y souvenir" with Ciclonautas	2021	Camping del astio
"One of us" with Beth Rodergas	2022	Natural Women
"Vivir lento" with Éxtasis	2022	Non-album singles
"La reina de las nieves" with Andrea Santiago	2022	Prenderle fuego a todo
"Braile" with Juan Belda	2023	Rayo
"La duda" with Luis Carrillo	2023	Puntos de fuga
"En mi lugar" with various artists	2023	Día internacional de la mujer
"Guapa y lista" with Rocío Saiz	2023	Autoboicot y descanso
"Loto" with Bruno Álves	2024	Non-album singles
"Dame una alegría" with Fran Perea	2024	Non-album singles
"Mi cabeza" with Alex Wall	2024	Non-album singles
"Crisis" with Celia Becks	2024	Non-album singles

== Filmography ==
=== Television ===
Year	Title	Channel	Notes
2020	Operación Triunfo 2020	Televisión Española	Contestant - 6th place
2025	Benidorm Fest 2025	Televisión Española	Contestant

=== Podcast ===
Year	Title	Platform(s)	Role	Notes
2023-2025	Triunfitas con Traumitas	Podimo, Spotify and YouTube	Presenter with Samantha Gilabert	
