= Operación Triunfo series 11 =

Spanish reality television music competition

Operación Triunfo
- Series 11
- Hosted by: Roberto Leal
- Judges: Natalia Jiménez; Javier Llano; Nina; Javier Portugués; Ruth Lorenzo (stand-in); Miqui Puig (stand-in)
- Winner: Nia Correia
- Runner-up: Flavio Fernández
- Location: Parc Audiovisual de Catalunya, Terrassa, Barcelona

Release
- Original network: La 1
- Original release: 12 January – 10 June 2020

Series chronology
- ← Previous; Series 10 Next → Series 12

Operación Triunfo is a Spanish reality television music competition to find new singing talent. The eleventh series, also known as Operación Triunfo 2020, began airing on La 1 on 12 January 2020, presented by Roberto Leal.

In addition to the Galas or weekly live shows on La 1, the side show El Chat aired on La 1 after each weekly Gala, hosted by Noemí Galera and Ricky Merino. The activities of the contestants at "The Academy" or La Academia are streamed live via YouTube.

Unlike the seasons previously aired by TVE, the series did not serve as the platform to select the Spanish entry at the Eurovision Song Contest 2020; singer Blas Cantó was internally selected by the broadcaster instead. Further changes were revealed during the presentation press conference on January 9, including different privileges to the favorite of the audience, who would no longer be automatically exempt from nomination, and the suppression of the usual limit to the number of contestants up for elimination.

Following the spread of COVID-19 in March 2020, the show was paused for two months, and then returned on May 20, with no live audience in the studio for the remaining episodes.

== Headmaster, judges and presenter ==
Roberto Leal continues as host and Noemí Galera continues as the headmaster of the Academy. Ana Torroja, Joe Pérez-Orive, and Manuel Martos left the judging panel. On 12 December 2019, it was announced that the panel would consist of four permanent judges, without the presence of rotatory guest judges like in the previous two seasons. It was announced that the panel would consist of music radio director Javier Llano – who was previously a permanent judge on series 4, 5 and 6 –, musician and talent scout Javier Portugués, singer and songwriter Natalia Jiménez, and singer and actress Nina – who was previously the headmaster of the Academy on series 1, 2, 3 and 8 – are the judges.

== Auditions ==
Open casting auditions began on 7 October 2019 in Barcelona and concluded on 6 November 2019 in Madrid. The minimum age to audition was 18.

Summary of open auditions
Location	Date(s)	Venue
Barcelona	7 October 2019	Palau Sant Jordi
Las Palmas	11 October 2019	Institución Ferial de Canarias
Valencia	14 October 2019	Feria Valencia
Palma	17 October 2019	Pavelló Municipal de Son Ferragut
Málaga	21 October 2019	Palacio de Deportes José María Martín Carpena
Seville	24 October 2019	Cartuja Center Cite
Bilbao	28 October 2019	Bilbao Arena
Santiago de Compostela	30 October 2019	Pavillón Multiusos Fontes do Sar
Madrid	5 November 2019	Madrid Arena

A total of 10,601 candidates participated in the open auditions. After the open auditions, 86 candidates were called for the final auditions that took place from 25 November to 26 November 2019 in Barcelona. For the first time, all phases of the casting auditions were streamed live via YouTube up until the announcement of the last thirty candidates. Eighteen of these candidates advanced to the introduction live show or "Gala 0".

== Contestants ==
18 contestants were presented on the introduction live show or Gala 0.

Contestant	Age	Residence	Episode of elimination	Place finished
Nia	26	Las Palmas, Canary Islands	Gala Final	Winner
Flavio	19	Murcia, Murcia	Gala Final	Runner-up
Eva	19	Sada, Galicia	Gala Final	3rd
Anaju	25	Alcañiz, Aragon	Gala Final	4th
Hugo	20	Córdoba, Andalusia	Gala Final	5th
Maialen	25	Pamplona, Navarre	Gala 12	6th
Samantha	25	Beniarrés, Valencian Community	Gala 12	7th
Bruno	25	Alcalá de Henares, Madrid	Gala 11	8th
Gèrard	20	Ceuta	Gala 10	9th
Jesús	24	Barbate, Andalusia	Gala 8	10th
Rafa	23	Adamuz, Andalusia	Gala 7	11th
Anne	18	Pamplona, Navarre	Gala 6	12th
Javy	21	Barbate, Andalusia	Gala 5	13th
Nick	19	Sant Cugat del Vallès, Catalonia	Gala 4	14th
Eli	19	Las Palmas, Canary Islands	Gala 3	15th
Ariadna	18	Sant Joan Despí, Catalonia	Gala 2	16th
Valery	22	Elche, Valencian Community	Gala 0	Not selected
Adri	23	Palma de Mallorca, Balearic Islands	Gala 0	Not selected

== Galas ==
The Galas or live shows began on 12 January 2020. In the introduction live show or Gala 0, 18 candidates were presented to enter the "Academy." Each contestant performed a cover version of a popular song of their choice, and two of the candidates were eliminated. For the regular galas, the contestants are assigned a popular song to perform in a duet or solo. The audience votes for their favourite performer, and the contestant with the most votes receives a privilege in the competition, which varies every week. The jury panel comments on the performances and nominates a number of contestants for elimination. The Academy's staff meeting has the option to save one of the nominees. The safe contestants save one of the remaining nominees. Each week, at least two contestants end up being up for elimination.

=== Results summary ===
Colour key
Selected by the judges - Gala 0
Selected by the teachers - Gala 0
Selected by the televote - Gala 0
Eliminated by the televote
Nominated by the judges, but saved by the teachers
Contestant was nominated by the judges, but saved by the other contestants
Weekly favourite from the mobile app
Nominated as weekly favourite from the mobile app, but came second
Nominated as weekly favourite from the mobile app, but came third
Contestant exempt from being nominated and/or expelled due to the temporary suspension of the contest due to the COVID-19 pandemic.
Chosen as finalist
Finalist chosen by the judges
Finalist chosen by the televote
3rd finalist
2nd finalist
Winner

	Gala 0	Gala 1	Gala 2	Gala 3	Gala 4	Gala 5	Gala 6	Gala 7	Gala 8	Gala 9 (Note: Due to Gala 9 (or Gala #OTYoMeQuedoEnCasa) taking place inside the Academy as a result of the COVID-19 pandemic, all contestants were exempt from nomination and the existing nominations were carried forward to the following gala.)	Gala 10	Gala 11	Gala 12	Final
Nia	Selected	Saved	Saved	Saved	Saved	Favourite	Saved	Saved	Saved	Exempt	Saved	Finalist	Finalist	Winner
Flavio	Selected	Saved	Favourite	Saved	Saved	Nominated	Saved	Nominated	Saved	Exempt	Nominated	Nominated	Finalist	Runner-up
Eva	Selected	Favourite	Saved	Saved	Nominated	Saved	Nominated	Saved	Saved	Exempt	Nominated	Saved	Finalist	3rd Place
Anaju	Selected	Saved	Nominated	Saved	Nominated	Saved	Saved	Nominated	Nominated	Exempt	Saved	Saved	Finalist	4th Place (Final)
Hugo	Selected	Saved	Saved	Favourite	Saved	Nominated	Nominated	Saved	Nominated		Saved	Finalist	Finalist	5th Place (Final)
Maialen	Selected	Saved	Saved	Nominated	Saved	Saved	Saved	Saved	Favourite	Exempt	Saved	Nominated	Eliminated (Gala 12)	
Samantha	Selected	Nominated	Saved	Nominated	Favourite	Saved	Saved	Saved	Nominated	Favourite	Nominated	Nominated	Eliminated (Gala 12)	
Bruno	Saved	Saved	Saved	Saved	Saved	Nominated	Nominated	Saved	Hugo	Exempt	Nominated	Eliminated (Gala 11)		
Gèrard	Selected	Saved	Nominated	Saved	Saved	Saved	Favourite	Nominated	Nominated		Eliminated (Gala 10)			
Jesús	Selected	Saved	Saved	Saved	Saved	Saved	Saved	Nominated	Eliminated (Gala 8)					
Rafa	Selected	Nominated	Nominated	Saved	Saved	Nominated	Nominated	Eliminated (Gala 7)						
Anne	Selected	Saved	Saved	Nominated	Nominated	Nominated	Eliminated							
Javy	Selected	Saved	Saved	Saved	Nominated	Eliminated								
Nick	Selected	Nominated	Saved	Nominated	Eliminated									
Eli	Selected	Saved	Nominated	Eliminated										
Ariadna	Selected	Nominated	Eliminated											
Adri	Eliminated													
Valery	Eliminated													
Up for elimination	Adri; Bruno; Javy; Valery	Ariadna; Nick; Rafa; Samantha	Anaju; Eli; Gèrard; Rafa	Anne; Maialen; Nick; Samantha	Anaju; Anne; Eva; Javy	Anne; Bruno; Flavio; Hugo; Rafa	Bruno; Eva; Hugo; Rafa	Anaju; Flavio; Gèrard; Jesús	Anaju; Gèrard; Hugo; Samantha	Gèrard; Hugo	Bruno; Eva; Flavio; Samantha	Anaju; Eva; Flavio; Maialen; Samantha	Winner	NIA; 45% to win (out of 3)
Saved by Academy's staff	Bruno	Samantha	Anaju	Samantha	Anne	Hugo	None	Anaju	Samantha	None	Eva	Eva	Winner	NIA; 45% to win (out of 3)
Saved by contestants	None	Rafa; 13 of 13 votes to save	Gèrard; 5* of 12 votes to save	Anne; 7 of 11 votes to save	Eva; 6 of 10 votes to save	Rafa; 3* of 8 votes to save	Eva; 2* of 7 votes to save	Flavio; 3 of 7 votes to save	Anaju; 2* of 6 votes to save	None	Samantha; 4 of 5 votes to save	None	Finalist	Flavio; 32% to win (out of 3)
Saved by jury	None											Anaju	Finalist	Flavio; 32% to win (out of 3)
Saved by public vote	Javy; Most votes to save	Nick; 66% to save	Rafa; 92% to save	Maialen; 57% to save	Anaju; 57% to save	Flavio; 44% to save	Hugo; 46% to save	Gèrard; 81% to save	Eviction postponed	Hugo; 57% to save	Flavio; 78% to save	Flavio; 36% to save	Finalist	Eva; 23% to win (out of 3)
Saved by public vote	Javy; Most votes to save	Nick; 66% to save	Rafa; 92% to save	Maialen; 57% to save	Anaju; 57% to save	Bruno; 30% to save	Bruno; 29% to save	Gèrard; 81% to save	Eviction postponed	Hugo; 57% to save	Flavio; 78% to save	Flavio; 36% to save	Finalist	Eva; 23% to win (out of 3)
Eliminated	Adri; Fewest votes to save	Ariadna; 34% to save	Eli; 8% to save	Nick; 43% to save	Javy; 43% to save	Anne; 26% to save	Rafa; 25% to save	Jesús; 19% to save	Eviction postponed	Gèrard; 43% to save	Bruno; 22% to save	Maialen; 33% to save	Finalist	Anaju; 15% to win (out of 5)
Eliminated	Valery; Fewest votes to save	Ariadna; 34% to save	Eli; 8% to save	Nick; 43% to save	Javy; 43% to save	Anne; 26% to save	Rafa; 25% to save	Jesús; 19% to save	Eviction postponed	Gèrard; 43% to save	Bruno; 22% to save	Samantha; 31% to save	Finalist	Hugo; 13% to win (out of 5)

=== Gala 0 (12 January 2020) ===
Contestants' performances on Gala 0
Contestant	Order	Song	Result
Nick	1	"Wrecking Ball"	Saved by the jury
Maialen	2	"Nuestra canción"	Saved by the jury
Eli	3	"Mustang Sally"	Saved by the jury
Nia	4	"I Like It"	Saved by the jury
Bruno	5	"Believer"	Saved by the Academy's staff
Rafa	6	"Mi primer día"	Saved by the jury
Valery	7	"Titanium"	Eliminated
Ariadna	8	"Por la boca vive el pez"	Saved by the jury
Gèrard	9	"This Is the Last Time"	Saved by the jury
Adri	10	"Me Rehúso"	Eliminated
Eva	11	"Let's Twist Again"	Saved by the jury
Flavio	12	"Your Man"	Saved by the jury
Anaju	13	"Catalina"	Saved by the jury
Hugo	14	"Lobos"	Saved by the jury
Anne	15	"Moon River"	Saved by the jury
Javy	16	"Contigo"	Saved by the public vote
Jesús	17	"Vengo venenoso"	Saved by the jury
Samantha	18	"Que tinguem sort"	Saved by the jury

=== Gala 1 (19 January 2020) ===
- Group performance: Marisol medley ("Estando contigo", "Ola, ola, ola", and "Tómbola")
- Musical guests:
  - Vanesa Martín ("Caída libre")
  - Danny Ocean ("Swing")
- Favourite's privilege: Choice of duet partner for the next Gala.

Contestants' performances on Gala 1
Contestant	Order	Song	Result
Eva	1	"Little Talks"	Favourite of the audience; saved by the jury
Nick	1	"Little Talks"	Nominated by the jury; up for elimination
Maialen	2	"Sinmigo"	Saved by the jury
Bruno	2	"Sinmigo"	Saved by the jury
Eli	3	"Atrévete-te-te"	Saved by the jury
Jesús	3	"Atrévete-te-te"	Saved by the jury
Ariadna	4	"Good as Hell"	Nominated by the jury; up for elimination
Nia	4	"Good as Hell"	Saved by the jury
Javy	5	"Te espero aquí"	Saved by the jury
Samantha	5	"Te espero aquí"	Nominated by the jury; saved by the Academy's staff
Anaju	6	"Up"	Saved by the jury
Gèrard	6	"Up"	Saved by the jury
Anne	7	"Another Love"	Saved by the jury
Flavio	7	"Another Love"	Saved by the jury
Hugo	8	"Tu calorro"	Saved by the jury
Rafa	8	"Tu calorro"	Nominated by the jury; saved by contestants

=== Gala 2 (26 January 2020) ===
- Group performance: "I'll Be There for You"
- Musical guests:
  - Natalia Lacunza ("Olvídate de mí")
  - Dvicio ("Dosis")
- Favourite's privilege: Performing solo at the next Gala.

Contestants' performances on Gala 2
Contestant	Order	Song	Result
Up for elimination
Ariadna	1	"You Know I'm No Good"	Eliminated
Nick	2	"Jealous"	Saved by the public vote; saved by the jury
Regular performances
Bruno	3	"Mucho mejor"	Saved by the jury
Javy	3	"Mucho mejor"	Saved by the jury
Anne	4	"Ilargia"	Saved by the jury
Maialen	4	"Ilargia"	Saved by the jury
Rafa	5	"Bonita"	Nominated by the jury; up for elimination
Eli	5	"Bonita"	Nominated by the jury; up for elimination
Eva	6	"Copenhague"	Saved by the jury
Flavio	6	"Copenhague"	Favourite of the audience; saved by the jury
Hugo	7	"Sucker"	Saved by the jury
Gèrard	7	"Sucker"	Nominated by the jury; saved by contestants
Jesús	8	"Mediterráneo"	Saved by the jury
Samantha	8	"Mediterráneo"	Saved by the jury
Nia	9	"Guantanamera"	Saved by the jury
Anaju	9	"Guantanamera"	Nominated by the jury; saved by the Academy's staff

=== Gala 3 (2 February 2020) ===
- Group performance: "Besos"
- Musical guests:
  - Beret ("Si por mí fuera")
  - Ainhoa Arteta ("Piensa en mí")
- Favourite's privilege: Giving themself or another contestant immunity from nomination.

Contestants' performances on Gala 3
Contestant	Order	Song	Result
Up for elimination
Rafa	3	"Sentimiento de caoba"	Saved by the public vote; saved by the jury
Eli	4	"Mama Do (Uh Oh, Uh Oh)"	Eliminated
Regular performances
Flavio	1	"Shotgun"	Saved by the jury
Anaju	2	"Señorita"	Saved by the jury
Hugo	2	"Señorita"	Favourite of the audience; saved by favourite's privilege
Anne	5	"Podría ser peor"	Nominated by the jury; saved by contestants
Bruno	5	"Podría ser peor"	Saved by the jury
Javy	6	"Tu frialdad"	Saved by the jury
Jesús	6	"Tu frialdad"	Saved by the jury
Maialen	7	"Semilla negra"	Nominated by the jury; up for elimination
Nick	7	"Semilla negra"	Nominated by the jury; up for elimination
Gèrard	8	"La despedida"	Saved by the jury
Nia	8	"La despedida"	Saved by the jury
Eva	9	"Maniac"	Saved by the jury
Samantha	9	"Maniac"	Nominated by the jury; saved by the Academy's staff

=== Gala 4 (9 February 2020) ===
- Group performance: "Díselo a la vida" (original song by Rafa)
- Musical guests:
  - Blas Cantó ("Universo")
  - Miki Núñez ("Celébrate")
- Favourite's privilege: Carte blanche - choice of song, choreography and possibility to either perform solo or select duet partner for the next Gala.

Contestants' performances on Gala 4
Contestant	Order	Song	Result
Up for elimination
Maialen	3	"Dinamita"	Saved by the public vote; saved by the jury
Nick	4	"Thriller"	Eliminated
Regular performances
Flavio	1	"Call Me Maybe"	Saved by the jury
Samantha	1	"Call Me Maybe"	Favourite of the audience; saved by the jury
Bruno	2	"Bad Girls"	Saved by the jury
Nia	2	"Bad Girls"	Saved by the jury
Anaju	5	"Amor eterno"	Nominated by the jury; up for elimination
Javy	5	"Amor eterno"	Nominated by the jury; up for elimination
Anne	6	"Wicked Game"	Nominated by the jury; saved by the Academy's staff
Gèrard	6	"Wicked Game"	Saved by the jury
Eva	7	"Esperando"	Nominated by the jury; saved by contestants
Hugo	7	"Esperando"	Saved by the jury
Jesús	8	"Princesas"	Saved by the jury
Rafa	8	"Princesas"	Saved by the jury

=== Gala 5 (16 February 2020) ===
- Group performance: "Sabor de amor"
- Musical guests:
  - Nil Moliner & Dani Fernández ("Soldadito de hierro")
  - Gisela ("Mucho más allá")
- Favourite's privilege: Performing alongside one of the musical guests on the next Gala.
- Ruth Lorenzo stood in for Natalia Jiménez in the jury.

Contestants' performances on Gala 5
Contestant	Order	Song	Result
Up for elimination
Anaju	1	"La sandunguera"	Saved by the public vote; saved by the jury
Javy	2	"Qué sabrá Neruda" (original song)	Eliminated
Regular performances
Hugo	3	"Vas a quedarte"	Nominated by the jury; saved by the Academy's staff
Samantha	3	"Vas a quedarte"	Saved by the jury
Eva	4	"I Follow Rivers"	Saved by the jury
Anne	5	"Looking for Paradise"	Nominated by the jury; up for elimination
Rafa	5	"Looking for Paradise"	Nominated by the jury; saved by contestants
Bruno	6	"Everybody (Backstreet's Back)"	Nominated by the jury; up for elimination
Jesús	6	"Everybody (Backstreet's Back)"	Saved by the jury
Gèrard	7	"Prometo"	Saved by the jury
Nia	8	"Run the World (Girls)"	Favourite of the audience; saved by the jury
Flavio	9	"Perfect Day"	Nominated by the jury; up for elimination
Maialen	9	"Perfect Day"	Saved by the jury

=== Gala 6 (23 February 2020) ===
- Group performance: "Video Killed the Radio Star"
- Musical guests:
  - Estrella Morente ("Volver" - with Nia)
  - Miriam Rodríguez ("Desperté")
  - Sinsinati ("Indios y vaqueros")
- Favorite's privilege: Giving themself or another contestant immunity from elimination.
- For the first time, the Academy staff decided not to save any of the nominated contestants and kept the four nominees up for elimination.

Contestants' performances on Gala 6
Contestant	Order	Song	Result
Up for elimination
Flavio	2	"That's Life"	Saved by the public vote; saved by the jury
Bruno	3	"Lately"	Saved by the public vote; nominated by the jury; up for elimination
Anne	4	"Unchained Melody"	Eliminated
Regular performances
Eva	1	"The Loco-Motion"	Nominated by the jury; saved by contestants
Gèrard	1	"The Loco-Motion"	Favourite of the audience; saved by favourite's privilege
Jesús	5	"La última noche"	Saved by the jury
Nia	5	"La última noche"	Saved by the jury
Rafa	6	"La lista de la compra"	Nominated by the jury; up for elimination
Samantha	6	"La lista de la compra"	Saved by the jury
Anaju	7	"Con altura"	Saved by the jury
Maialen	7	"Con altura"	Saved by the jury
Hugo	8	"Ya no quiero ná"	Nominated by the jury; up for elimination

=== Gala 7 (1 March 2020) ===
- Group performance: "Waka Waka (Esto es África)"
- Musical guests:
  - Edurne ("Demasiado tarde")
  - Ariadna ("Al santo equivocado")
- Favorite's privilege: Choice of duet partner for the next Gala.
- For the first time, the Favourite of the audience (Anaju) was nominated by the jury for elimination.

Contestants' performances on Gala 7
Contestant	Order	Song	Result
Up for elimination
Hugo	1	"Genius"	Saved by the public vote; saved by the jury
Bruno	3	"Llegué hasta ti"	Saved by the public vote; saved by the jury
Rafa	5	"Cojo el saco y me retiro"	Eliminated
Regular performances
Maialen	2	"Andar Conmigo"	Saved by the jury
Eva	4	"Don't Start Now"	Saved by the jury
Nia	4	"Don't Start Now"	Saved by the jury
Flavio	6	"Never Gonna Give You Up"	Nominated by the jury; saved by contestants
Gèrard	6	"Never Gonna Give You Up"	Nominated by the jury; up for elimination
Jesús	7	"Sábado por la tarde"	Nominated by the jury; up for elimination
Anaju	8	"Tusa"	Favourite of the audience; nominated by the jury; saved by the Academy's staff
Samantha	9	"Human"	Saved by the jury

=== Gala 8 (8 March 2020) ===
- Group performance: "No Controles"
- Musical guests:
  - Nathy Peluso ("Business Woman")
  - Dora Postigo ("Ojos de serpiente")
- Favourite's privilege: Giving themself or another contestant immunity from nomination.
- Samantha was not medically cleared to participate in the group performance due to a knee injury.

Contestants' performances on Gala 8
Contestant	Order	Song	Result
Up for elimination
Gèrard	3	"Brown Eyed Lover"	Saved by the public vote; nominated by the jury; up for elimination
Jesús	4	"El Alma al Aire"	Eliminated
Regular performances
Anaju	1	"Girls Just Want to Have Fun"	Nominated by the jury; saved by contestants
Samantha	1	"Girls Just Want to Have Fun"	Nominated by the jury; saved by the Academy's staff
Nia	2	"Mujer Latina"	Saved by the jury
Maialen	5	"Just a Girl"	Favourite of the audience; saved by the jury
Flavio	6	"Man! I Feel Like a Woman!"	Saved by the jury
Bruno	7	"La puerta violeta"	Saved by favourite's privilege
Eva	8	"Bad Guy"	Saved by the jury
Hugo	9	"Se acabó"	Nominated by the jury; up for elimination

=== Gala 9 (15 March 2020) ===
- Group performance: "Hey Ya!"
- Musical guests:
  - Alfred García ("Por si te hace falta")
  - Rozalén ("Vivir")
  - Marwan ("Las cosas que no pude responder")
- Favorite's privilege: A special dinner for two in the Academy later in the week with another contestant of their choosing.
- Due to the state of alarm declared in Spain as a result of the ongoing coronavirus pandemic, this Gala was held inside the Academy, with Roberto Leal hosting from his home, and there was no Chat show after the Gala. Musical guests also performed from their homes. Also a result of this, the week's elimination was delayed to Gala 10, with audience voting frozen until a week prior to its airdate once it was set. Miqui Puig and Nina served as jury from the elimination room.

Contestants' performances on Gala 9
Contestant	Order	Song	Result
Up for elimination
Hugo	1	"Heroes"	Elimination postponed to Gala 10
Gèrard	2	"Someone You Loved"	Elimination postponed to Gala 10
Regular performances
Samantha	3	"Milionària"	Favourite of the audience
Anaju	4	"Inevitable"	
Flavio	5	"Suspicious Minds"	
Maialen	6	"Dance Monkey"	
Nia	7	"El Triste"	
Eva	8	"Hoy la bestia cena en casa"	
Bruno	9	"Quiero tener tu presencia"	

=== Gala 10 (20 May 2020) ===
The show was put on hiatus and the remaining contestants sent home as a precautionary measure over the ongoing coronavirus pandemic.

- Group performance: "Sonrisa"
- Musical guests:
  - Stay Homas & Sr. Wilson ("Stay Homa")
  - Anne Lukin ("Salté")
  - Jesús Rendón ("Me sabe a sal")
- Starting this week, there will no longer be a favorite of the audience.

Contestants' performances on Gala 10
Contestant	Order	Song	Result
Up for elimination
Hugo	1	"Mmm Yeah"	Saved by the public vote; saved by the jury
Gèrard	2	"Pillowtalk"	Eliminated
Regular performances
Nia	3	"Quimbara"	Saved by the jury
Bruno	4	"A las nueve"	Nominated by the jury; up for elimination
Samantha	5	"Sueños Rotos"	Nominated by the jury; saved by contestants
Anaju	6	"Man Down"	Saved by the jury
Eva	7	"Part-Time Lover"	Nominated by the jury; saved by the Academy's staff
Maialen	8	"Sargento de hierro"	Saved by the jury
Flavio	9	"Human"	Nominated by the jury; up for elimination

=== Gala 11 (27 May 2020) ===
- Group performance: "Forever Young" (featuring the Academy staff)
- Musical guests:
  - Pablo López ("Mariposa")
  - Nick Maylo ("Historias robadas")
  - Eli Rosex ("Miénteme lento")

Contestants' performances on Gala 11
Contestant	Order	Song	Result
Up for elimination
Flavio	1	"Calma" (original song)	Saved by the public vote; up for elimination
Bruno	2	"Fugitivos" (original song)	Eliminated
Regular performances
Maialen	3	"Should I Stay or Should I Go"	Up for elimination
Anaju	4	"Nunca estoy"	Up for elimination
Hugo	5	"La leyenda del tiempo"	Saved by the jury; Finalist
Eva	6	"Nothing Else Matters"	Saved by the Academy's staff; Finalist
Samantha	7	"Freed from Desire"	Up for elimination
Nia	8	"Halo"	Saved by the jury; Finalist

=== Gala 12 (3 June 2020) ===
- Group performance: "Lay All Your Love on Me"
- The contestants that had already been declared finalists performed alongside musical guests.
- Musical guests:
  - Gèrard ("Fugaces")
  - Natalia Jiménez ("El lado izquierdo de la cama")
  - Rozalén ("Este tren")

Contestants' performances on Gala 12
Contestant	Order	Solo Song	Order	Group Song	Result
Samantha	1	"Something's Got a Hold on Me"	5	"R.I.P."	Eliminated
Anaju	2	"Nana del Mediterráneo"	5	"R.I.P."	Saved by the jury; Finalist
Nia	9	"Hoy Tengo Ganas de Ti" (with Blas Cantó)	5	"R.I.P."	Already qualified
Flavio	3	"Vi"	7	"Hey! Baby"	Saved by the public vote; Finalist
Eva	8	"El momento" (with La Casa Azul)	7	"Hey! Baby"	Already qualified
Maialen	4	"Si te vas"	10	"Adiós papá"	Eliminated
Hugo	6	"Me vale" (with Miki Núñez)	10	"Adiós papá"	Already qualified

=== Gala Final (10 June 2020) ===
- Group performances:
  - Medley of Gala 0 songs
  - "Sal de mí" (all contestants)
  - "Díselo a la vida" (all contestants)
- Musical guests:
  - Lola Índigo ("Mala cara" / "4 Besos")
  - La Oreja de Van Gogh ("Abrázame")
  - Famous Oberogo ("Hoy ya no")

Contestants' performances on Gala Final
Contestant	Order	Final Song	Order	Original Song	Result
Anaju	1	"7 Rings"	N/A (already eliminated)		4th place
Eva	2	"People Help the People"	6	"Dumb"	3rd place
Flavio	3	"Death of a Bachelor"	7	"Calma"	Runner-up
Hugo	4	"Radioactive"	N/A (already eliminated)		5th place
Nia	5	"Say Something"	8	"8 maravillas"	Winner

== Ratings ==
Operación Triunfo 2020 consolidated viewership and adjusted position Colour key: – Highest rating during the season (nominal) – Lowest rating during the season (nominal)
Episode	Original airdate	Timeslot	Viewers (millions)	Share	Night Rank	Source
"Season Premiere-Gala 0"	12 January 2020	Sunday 10:05 pm	1.82	13.0%	#3	
"Gala 1"	19 January 2020	Sunday 10:05 pm	1.87	12.6%	#3	
"Gala 2"	26 January 2020	Sunday 10:05 pm	1.80	12.6%	#2	
"Gala 3"	2 February 2020	Sunday 10:05 pm	1.74	12.3%	#4	
"Gala 4"	9 February 2020	Sunday 10:05 pm	1.55	10.6%	#4	
"Gala 5"	16 February 2020	Sunday 10:05 pm	1.64	12.2%	#2	
"Gala 6"	23 February 2020	Sunday 10:05 pm	1.43	10.7%	#4	
"Gala 7"	1 March 2020	Sunday 10:05 pm	1.37	11.1%	#3	
"Gala 8"	8 March 2020	Sunday 10:05 pm	1.48	10.9%	#3	
"Gala 9 - #OTYoMeQuedoEnCasa"	15 March 2020	Sunday 10:05 pm	1.86	12.7%	#2	
"Gala 10"	20 May 2020	Wednesday 10:05 pm	1.47	11.1%	#2	
"Gala 11"	27 May 2020	Wednesday 10:05 pm	1.63	13.0%	#1	
"Gala 12"	3 June 2020	Wednesday 10:05 pm	1.57	12.6%	#2	
"Gala Final"	10 June 2020	Wednesday 10:05 pm	1.81	16.1%	#3	
