= Nia (singer) =

Spanish singer (born 1994)

NIA
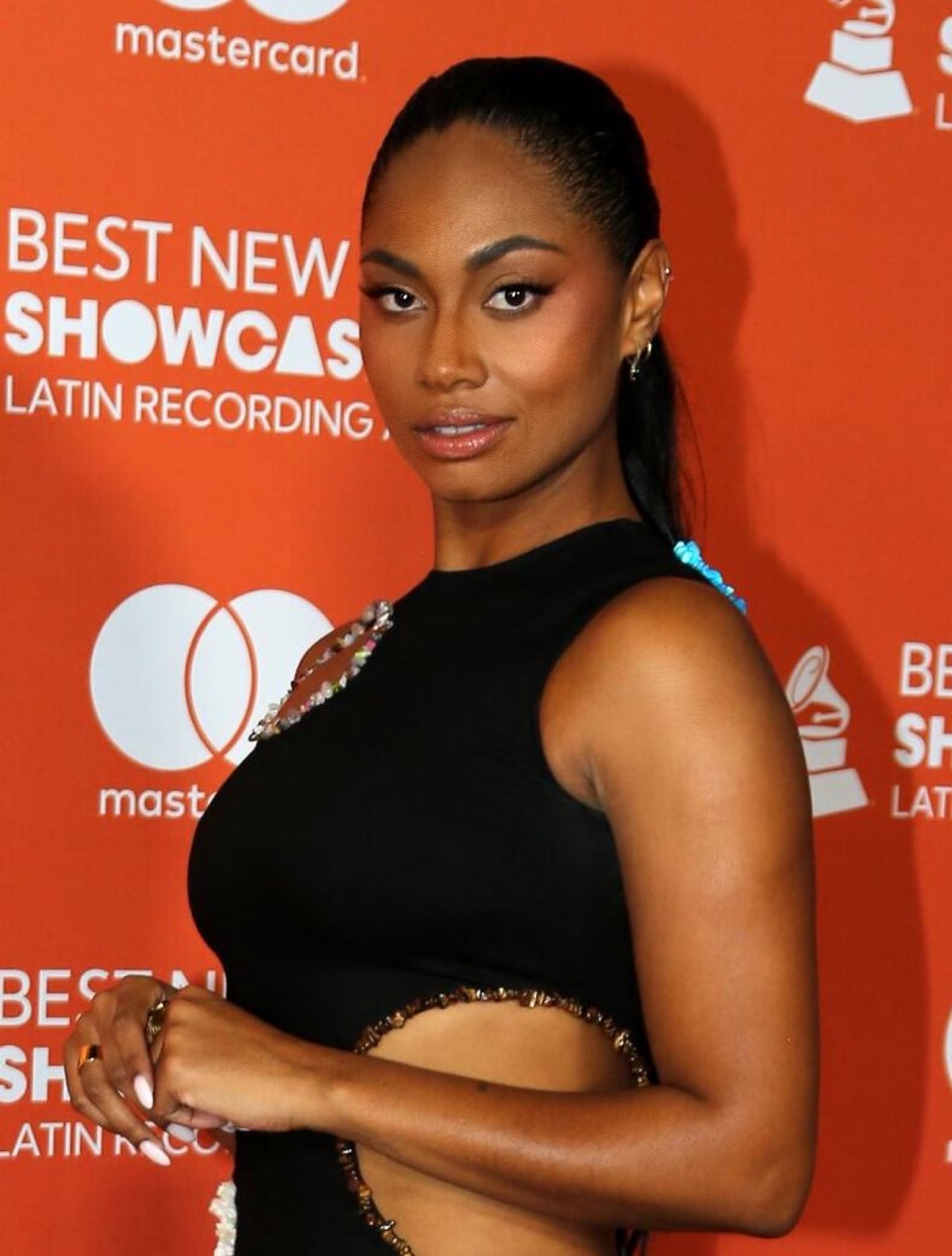
- NIA at the Latin Grammys 2023.

Background information
- Also known as: NIA
- Born: Estefanía Correia González; 2 January 1994 (age 32); Las Palmas, Canary Islands, Spain
- Genres: Salsa; Latin; Latin pop; Cubaton; bolero
- Occupations: Singer; songwriter; TV presenter; actress; businesswoman
- Instrument: Vocals
- Years active: 2020–present
- Labels: Sony Music (2020-2022); Must! Producciones (2022-present)

Estefanía Correia González (born 2 January 1994), known professionally as Nia (stylized in all caps), is a Spanish singer, songwriter, TV presenter, actress and businesswoman. She rose to prominence by winning the 2020 edition of the Operación Triunfo contest.

Nia has collaborated both in the studio and live with artists such as Celia Cruz, Antonio Carmona, Sebastián Yatra, Gente de Zona, Edurne, India Martínez, El Taiger, María Peláe, Nyno Vargas and Rocco Hunt, among others. She has also received a nomination for the ACAMUS Awards.

In addition to her musical career, Nia has had a notable participation in television, having participated in Dúos increíbles, Tu cara me suena, Factor X and Tú si que vales. Likewise, in the cinema, she was part of the cast of Once Upon a Time... Happily Never After. In Spain, she is also known for having given life to the Spanish Nala in the musical The Lion King, produced by Stage Entertainment Spain in collaboration with Disney Theatricals.

== Early life ==
Born to a Bissau-Guinean father and a Canarian mother, Nia has worked as a singer in the musical El Rey León and has worked in Ibiza as an animator in a show. She has also sung in the Choir of the Gran Canaria Philharmonic Orchestra.

== Musical career ==
=== 2020: Operación Triunfo 2020 ===
During Operación Triunfo, Nia stood out for her quality and voice, which is why she did not get nominated to be eliminated. In addition, she was the first finalist and winner of the eleventh series. Her performances stood out for rhythm and movement, with intricate choreography very well executed. During the contest, NIA released her first single, Ocho Maravillas (Eight Wonders).

=== 2021-2022: Cuídate and Tu cara me suena ===
In July 2021, Nia released her first EP, titled Cuídate (Take Care). The introductory single was the song Malayerba. Later that Autumn, it was announced that she would participate in the 9th season of the contest Tu cara me suena, by Antena 3. She went on to finish runner-up the series after picking up 26% of the vote following her grand final imitation of Whitney Houston singing "I Will Always Love You". In May, Nia opened the gala of the 9th Platino Awards.

=== 2023-present: PaloSanto ===
On 15 February 2023, Nia participated in the Carnival of Santa Cruz de Tenerife, in the Queen Election selection. On 6 July, Rolling Stone magazine named Nia as one of the "artists you should know." On 6 October, she released her debut album entitled PaloSanto. Ten days later, it was announced that PaloSanto had been the thirteenth best-selling album of the week in Spain. On 28 November, she performed at Gala 1 of Operación Triunfo 2023 as a guest, performing her singles "Caminito de Lamento" and "Brujería".

== Other works ==
Apart from being a singer, Nia has ventured into television presenting and has established herself as a businesswoman through several endorsement deals and lucrative contracts. At the end of 2022, Nia became a businesswoman by opening a restaurant in the center of Madrid called Delito.

=== TV presenter ===
In December 2022, Televisión Española (TVE) announced that Nia would present the New Year's Eve 2022-2023 chimes live for all of Spain from Gáldar accompanied by Roberto Herrera, presenter of TVE in the Canary Islands. This broadcast was carried out from the Plaza de Santiago of the city. The chimes were followed by 3,581,000 viewers with a screen share of 27.5%.

Nia presented the Dial 2023 Awards with Edurne and Carmen Ramírez on the island of Tenerife. On 5 December 2023, TVE announced that Nia would present the 2023-2024 New Year's Eve chimes live for the second consecutive year throughout Spain, once again accompanied by Roberto Herrera. During the broadcast of the chimes, they made a mistake, making that the audience began to eat the grapes belatedly. The chimes were followed by an audience of 3,253,000 and 27.5% throughout Spain.

=== Acting career ===
Nia had her first contact with acting in 2022, when she starred in the Netflix series Once Upon a Time... Happily Never After playing Ana and Juana. The series directed by Manolo Caro also had a cast which included Sebastián Yatra, Asier Etxeandia, Mariana Treviño, Mariola Fuentes and Rossy de Palma among others.

== Artistry ==
=== Influences ===
Nia credits Marc Anthony as her greatest musical influence and idol, and on numerous occasions, she has said that this would be the artist she would love to collaborate with. She also mentions Celia Cruz as another of her great musical influences, which includes, among others, Alain Pérez, Gloria Estefan and Nathy Peluso.

== Discography ==
=== Studio albums ===
- 2020: Sus canciones (Operación Triunfo 2020)
- 2023: PaloSanto

=== EP ===
- 2021: Cuídate

== Filmography ==
=== Television ===
Year	Title	Channel	Role	Notes
2020	Operación Triunfo series 11	TVE	Herself	Contestant, Winner
2020-2023	The Resistance	#0	Herself	Guest, 4 episodes
2020	Zapeando	LaSexta	Herself	Guest, 1 episode
2021	¡Feliz 2021!	TVE	Herself	Guest
2021	Pasapalabra	Antena 3	Herself	Guest, 3 episodes
2021-2022	Tu cara me suena 9	Antena 3	Herself	Contestant, runner-up
2021-2023	Tierra de talento	Canal Sur	Herself	Guest, 3 episodes
2022	¡Feliz 2022!	TVE	Herself	Guest
2022	Benidorm Fest 2022	TVE	Herself	Guest
2022	Once Upon a Time... Happily Never After	Netflix	Ana / Juana	Protagonist, 6 episodes
2022	Martínez y Hermanos	#0	Herself	Guest, 1 episode
2022	La Noche D	TVE	Herself	Guest, 1 episode
2022	Dúos increíbles	TVE	Herself	Contestant, 4th place
2022	Noche de taifas	TVC	Herself	Guest, 1 episode
2023	¡Feliz 2023!	TVE	Herself	Guest
2023	EnREDa2	Canal Sur	Herself	Guest, 2 episodes
2023	Tierra de talento	Canal Sur	Herself	Guest, 2 episodes
2023	Noche de taifas	TVC	Herself	Guest, 1 episode
2023	That's My Jam España	Movistar+	Herself	Guest, 1 episode
2023-2024	Operación Triunfo series 12	Amazon Prime Video	Herself	Guest, 2 episodes
2023	HairStyle, The Talent Show	DKISS	Herself	Guest, 1 episode
2024	¡Feliz 2024!	TVE	Herself	Guest

=== Theater ===
Year	Title	Production	Role	Location
2012-2017	El Rey León	Stage Entertainment	Nala / Elenco	Madrid
