= Once Upon a Time... Happily Never After =

Spanish TV series

- Spanish: Érase una vez... pero ya no
- Genre: Musical comedy Fantasy
- Created by: Manolo Caro
- Written by: Kim Torres; Natalia García Argaz; Gabriel Nuncio; Manolo Caro
- Directed by: Manolo Caro
- Starring: Sebastián Yatra; Nía Correia; Mónica Maranillo; Asier Etxeandia; Mariana Treviño; Mariola Fuentes
- Composer: Lucas Vidal
- Country of origin: Spain
- Original languages: English; Spanish
- No. of seasons: 1
- No. of episodes: 6

Production
- Production company: Noc Noc Cinema
- Budget: €1.5 million per episode

Original release
- Network: Netflix
- Release: 11 March 2022

Once Upon a Time... Happily Never After (Spanish: Érase una vez... pero ya no) is a Spanish musical comedy series created by Manolo Caro and produced by Noc Noc Cinema for Netflix. It was released globally on the streaming platform on 11 March 2022, and stars Colombian singer Sebastián Yatra in his acting debut.

== Synopsis ==
Two estranged lovers must find each other in another life and reunite so they can break a spell that prevents an entire town from falling in love, but the arrival of two tourists will endanger their one chance at making it happen.

== Cast ==
- Sebastián Yatra as Diego / Maxi
- NIA as Ana / Juana
- Mónica Maranillo as Soledad / Goya
- Asier Etxeandia as Froilán / Antonio
- Mariana Treviño as Queen Dolores / Lola
- Mariola Fuentes as Queen Fátima / Simona
- Itziar Castro as Eloísa / Candela
- Julián Villagrán as Anselmo / Leo
- Daniela Vega as The Witch / Enamora
- Rossy de Palma as Diego's Mother / Mamen

== Episode list ==
No. overall	No. in season	Title	Original release date
1	1	"If You Don't Come Back" (Si tú no vuelves)	March 11, 2022
2	2	"Irresponsible" (Irresponsables)	March 11, 2022
3	3	"We Were Love" (Fuimos amor)	March 11, 2022
4	4	"I'm Going to Survive" (Sobreviviré)	March 11, 2022
5	5	"I'm Not That Girl" (Yo no soy esa)	March 11, 2022
6	6	"We Always Lived Together" (Vivimos siempre juntos)	March 11, 2022

== Critical reception ==
Upon its release, Once Upon a Time... Happily Never After was met with a negative reception from Spanish critics. Pere Solà Gimferrer of La Vanguardia wrote an "anti-recommendation" review of the show, stating: "It's a crass, absurd comedy that mixes fairytales, prostitution and a wardrobe that seems bought from a costume shop. It would be bold were it not for an unforgivable mistake it makes: being camp without being any fun." Espinof's Mikel Zorrilla also panned the series, pointing out its indecisive tone as its most important flaw: "At times it seems to be going for a more serious, dramatic approach, while in other occasions it dangerously flirts with ridiculousness. This could lead the viewer to despair over what's unfolding before their eyes, since even in the setting work, a certain narrative schizophrenia can be perceived, which dooms Once Upon a Time... Happily Never After to be Netflix's worst Spanish series to date."

Internationally, the series also received negative reviews. Decider's Joel Keller compared the show to American series Galavant, while noting both shows suffered from similar issues: "[Galavant creator Dan] Fogelman tried to cram so much funny into each episode, along with the musical interludes, that the story collapsed under the weight of all the devices he used. That’s the problem with Once Upon A Time... Happily Never After, but with the added device of two timelines and the same actors playing roles in each." He concluded the review by advising readers to skip the series: "There are better examples of musical comedy series out there (Zoey's Extraordinary Playlist, anyone?); there’s just too much going on in Once Upon A Time... Happily Never After to recommend it."
