= Rocío Saiz =

Spanish singer, actress, multidisciplinary artist, and LGBT activist (born 1991)

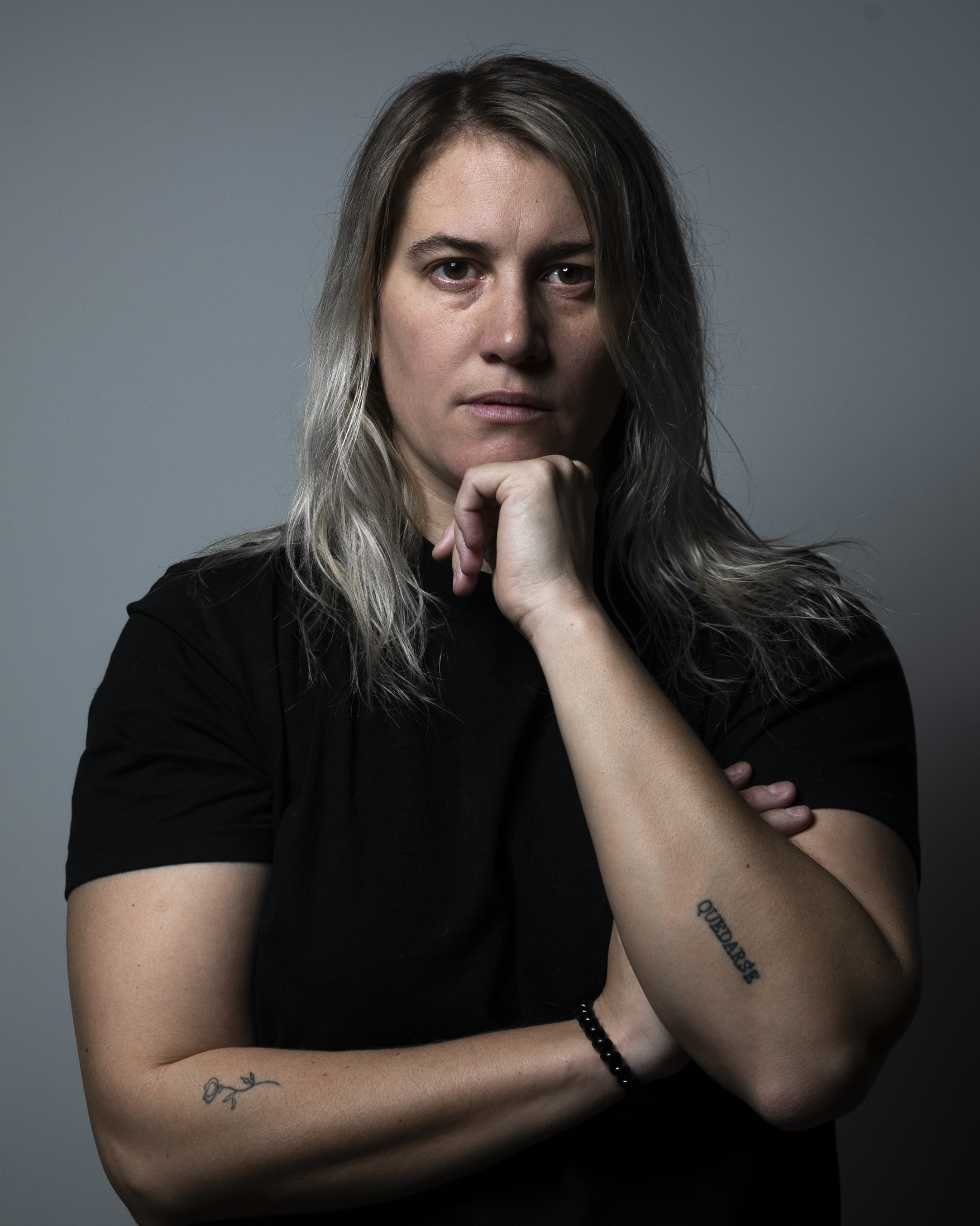
- Rocío Saiz in 2022

Background information
- Birth name: Rocío Saiz Madera
- Born: July 11, 1991 (age 34); Madrid, Spain
- Genres: Electronic pop
- Occupations: Singer; actress; musician; LGBT activist
- Labels: Primavera Labels

Rocio Saiz Madera (born 11 July 1991) is a Spanish singer, actress, multidisciplinary artist, and LGBT activist. In 2022, the State Federation of Lesbians, Gays, Trans and Bisexuals (FELGTB) awarded Saiz the Pluma Award in recognition of her work in the visibility and defense of the rights of LGBT people.

== Career ==
=== Early career in music management ===
She began her professional career working at agencies such as Emerge Management and Planta B Music, where she carried out the coordination and management of recognized national bands. Since 2019, Saiz has been responsible for production at Ground Control Management, where she handles the contracting of artists such as Hinds and The Parrots.

=== Music career ===
==== Las Chillers and Monterrosa ====
Saiz's first major musical project was as singer and leader of the group Las Chillers, a feminist band that performed versions of Spanish pop songs with a provocative and political approach. Subsequently, she formed the electronic duo Monterrosa alongside Enrique F. Aparicio.

==== Solo career ====
In 2021, Saiz presented her first solo album titled Amor Amargo, released by Primavera Labels and composed of seven electronic pop songs that explore themes of breakups, insecurities, and the emotional management of pain.

In 2023, Rocio Saiz released her second album, Autoboicot y descanso, a collection of eleven new songs released by Primavera Labels that presents the duality of life and feelings, dividing the songs between self-sabotage and rest.

==== Live performances ====
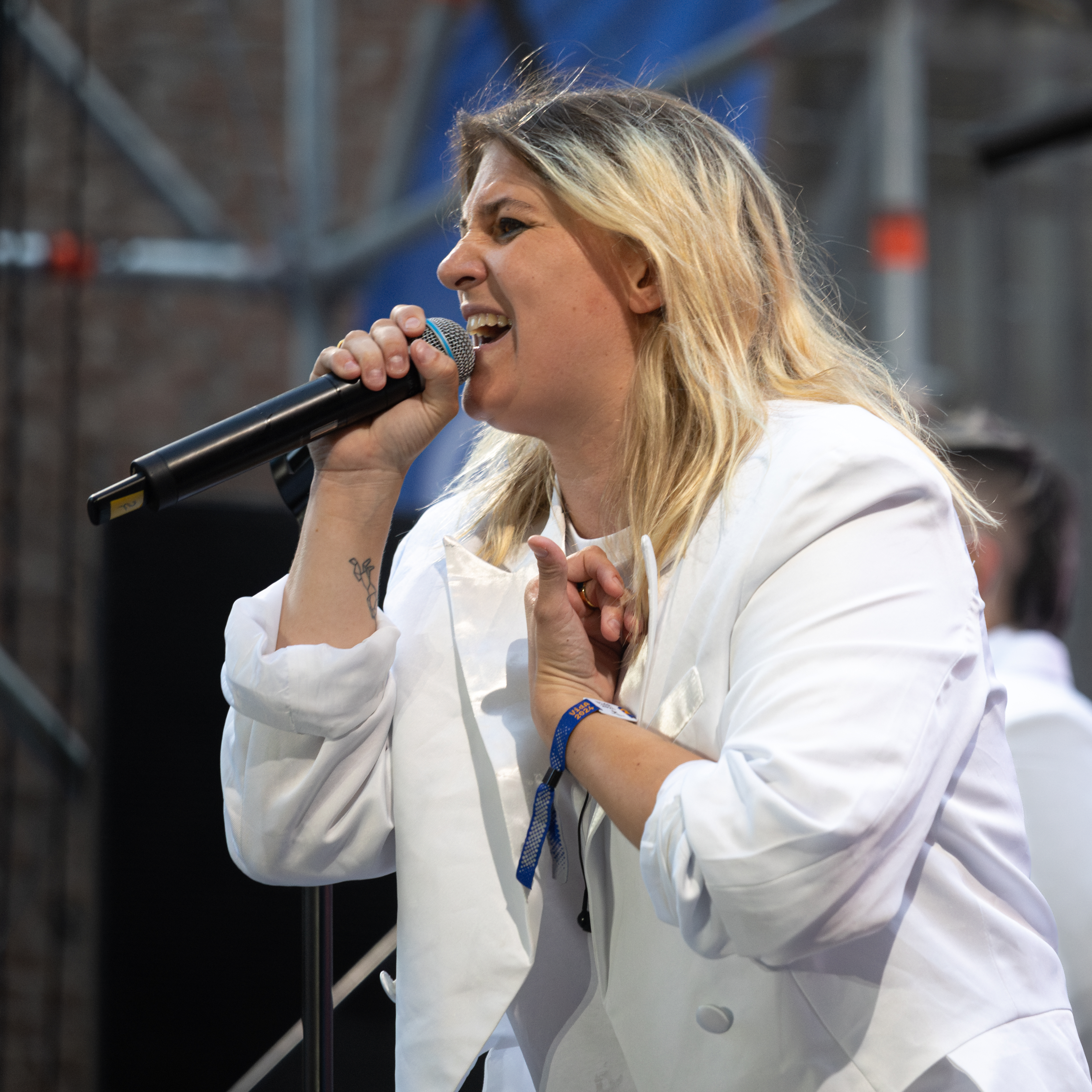

Throughout her career, she has performed at major festivals including Primavera Sound in Barcelona, the Low festival in Benidorm, South by Southwest (SXSW) in Austin (United States), Summercase, the Fulanita fest in Fuengirola, and the Festival SOS 4.8 in Murcia.

In early 2022, the Jagermeister music program included Saiz as one of the featured artists of their 2022 roster.

=== Acting career ===
In 2022, she made her first foray into cinema with the lesbian romantic comedy titled La amiga de mi amiga, directed by Zaida Carmona, which received two awards at the Barcelona International Independent Film Festival (D'A Film Festival). Saiz was part of the cast alongside actress Nausicaa Bonnin, director Alba Cros, singer-songwriter Christina Rosenvinge, and writer Brigitte Vasallo, among others. One of the songs from her album Amor amargo, titled "La juventud", was included in the film's soundtrack.

=== Writing career ===
In 2024, Saiz published her first novel titled Que no se te note (Rocaeditorial), marking her debut in literature. The title reflects a common phrase directed at LGBT people, encouraging them to hide their identity.

=== Media work ===
In 2020, during the COVID-19 pandemic lockdown, Saiz was one of the promoters of the Cuarentena Fest event, a streaming music festival where different artists performed their songs from their rooms so that anyone could watch them. During this same period, she collaborated in the La experiencia personal column, published by the Madrid section of the newspaper El Pais.

Since 2021, she has also been a collaborator on the program Que parezca un accidente on Radio 3 directed by Jose Manuel Sebastian, where Saiz has a weekly section called "Tengo el cono en modo avion".

== Activism ==
=== LGBT activism ===
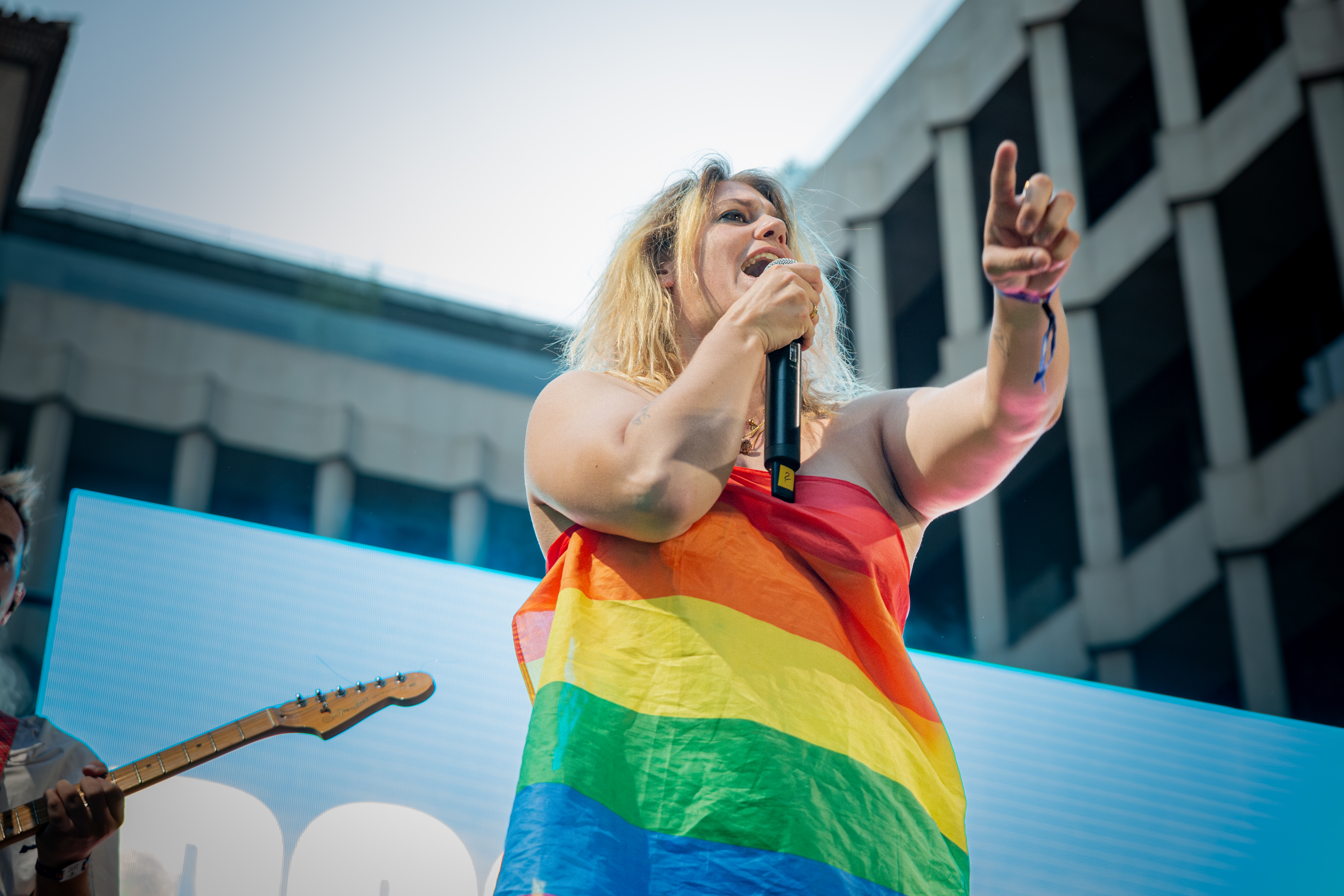

On 28 April 2022, Saiz was invited to the Congress of Deputies to participate as a speaker during Lesbian Visibility Day.

As an LGBT activist, Saiz is a regular guest in debate and advocacy spaces. She is part of the board of directors of the Association of Women in the Music Industry (MIM) and Keychange, a network that works for gender equality in the music industry through a campaign that invests in emerging female talents, analyzes with a gender perspective, and encourages European festivals to sign a parity commitment.

== Murcia controversy ==
In June 2023, Rocio Saiz became involved in a controversy during her performance at the "Murcia Pride" festival. The incident occurred when the singer exposed her breasts on stage as part of her performance, which led to the intervention of the local police. The performance took place on 24 June at the Plaza de la Catedral de Murcia. According to Saiz, the police forced her to interrupt her performance and escorted her off the stage, which she denounced as an act of censorship and discrimination.

The police action was justified by local authorities alleging that Saiz had committed an act of public indecency, which is prohibited according to municipal ordinances. However, this explanation did not convince many who saw the intervention as an attack on freedom of expression and the rights of the LGBT community. Subsequently, the police retracted their initial intervention, admitting that the response may have been disproportionate and expressing their respect for artistic and expressive freedom. Additionally, a disciplinary file was initiated against the agent involved.

In an act of solidarity, singer Eva Amaral showed her breasts during one of her own concerts, criticizing the police action and defending the right of artists to express themselves freely.

== Discography ==
=== Studio albums ===
Studio albums
Title	Album details
Amor amargo	Released: 2021; Label: Primavera Labels; Format: Digital download, streaming
Autoboicot y descanso	Released: 2023; Label: Primavera Labels; Format: Digital download, streaming

== Awards and recognition ==
- 2022: The State Federation of Lesbians, Gays, Trans and Bisexuals (FELGTB) awarded Saiz the Pluma Award in recognition of her work in the visibility and defense of the rights of LGBT people. She shared this award, created in 2007 and being the most important of the collective, with journalist Chelo Garcia-Cortes, actress Lola Rodriguez, and writer Oscar Hernandez Campano, among others.
