= Samantha Gilabert =

Spanish pop singer and songwriter (born 1994)

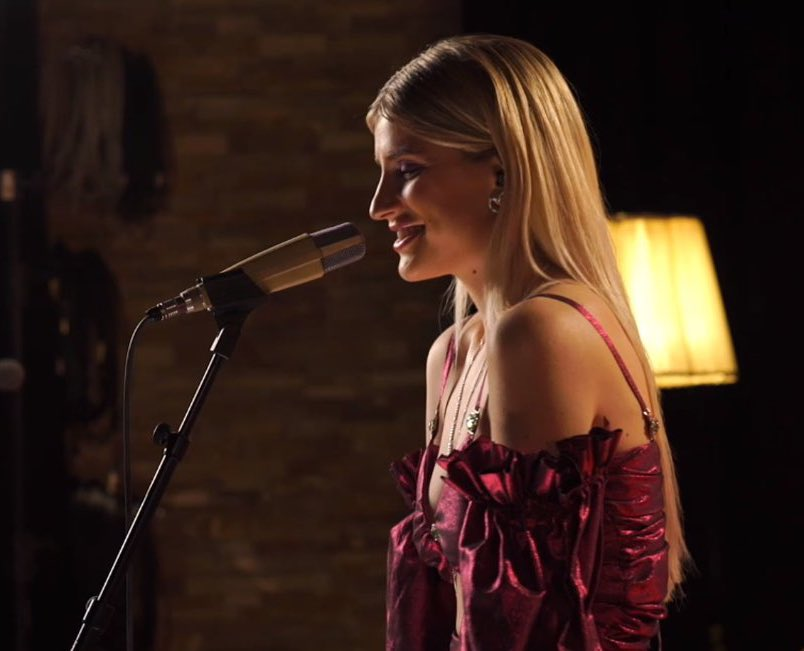
- Gilabert in 2021

Background information
- Born: Samantha Gilabert Garrido; June 2, 1994 (age 32); Beniarrés, Alicante, Spain
- Genres: Pop; Latin pop; Electropop; Rap
- Occupations: Singer; songwriter; podcaster
- Years active: 2018–present
- Label: Universal Music Spain
- Partner: Alejandro Vergara (2024–present)

Samantha Gilabert Garrido (born 6 February 1994) is a Spanish pop singer and songwriter. She gained national recognition as a semifinalist on the ninth season of the Spanish reality television talent competition Operación Triunfo in 2020. Gilabert has been open about her hearing disability, which affects 65% of her hearing capacity, and has become an advocate for disability awareness in the music industry.

== Early life and education ==
From an early age, Gilabert showed interest in music despite her hearing challenges. She learned to adapt her musical training and performance techniques to accommodate her disability, developing unique methods for feeling rhythm and melody through vibrations and visual cues. She studied musical language and piano, and later completed a Higher Degree in Tourism.

Before her solo career, Gilabert was part of the electro-urban and rap group "Cactus" in the Valencian alternative music scene. The group, influenced by artists like Calle 13 and Orxata Sound System, released two albums with production by Mark Dasousa and performed at festivals including Festivern.

== Career ==
=== Operación Triunfo 2020 ===
In 2020, Gilabert auditioned for the ninth season of Operación Triunfo, the Spanish reality television talent competition. Her participation was notable not only for her vocal abilities but also for bringing awareness to hearing disabilities in the entertainment industry and for her linguistic advocacy.

During the inaugural gala of Operación Triunfo 2020, Gilabert performed a version of the classic song "Que tinguem sort" by Lluís Llach, delivering it in Catalan as a linguistic statement. This performance was particularly significant as it showcased her commitment to regional languages and cultural diversity.

Gilabert's journey in the competition came to an end in the 12th gala. Despite her elimination, her presence on the program helped raise awareness about the capabilities of artists with disabilities and challenged preconceptions about hearing impairment in the music industry.

=== Recording career ===
Following her success on Operación Triunfo, Gilabert signed a recording contract with Universal Music Spain. Her post-show career began immediately with the release of her first solo single "Sin Más" in April 2020, which achieved over one million streams in just four days, demonstrating her strong fanbase from the television show.

In August 2020, she released "Espere Que Tornes" under Universal Music Spain, followed by her first solo EP "Nada" on 13 November 2020. The EP was a commercial success, reaching the Top 3 of Spain's digital sales charts in its first week. In 2021, she released her debut album Antídoto, which showcased her evolution as an artist and her pop and Latin pop influences.

=== Media work and podcasting ===
In 2025, Gilabert launched Tenemos que hablar... kheeé! (We Need to Talk... kheeé!), an exclusive podcast for the Podimo platform. The show, co-hosted with her partner actor Alejandro Vergara, focuses on relationships and features the couple discussing various aspects of their personal life with humor and authenticity.

Gilabert has also co-hosted the podcast "Triunfitas con traumitas" with fellow Operación Triunfo contestant Maialen Gurbindo, focusing on the experiences of former contestants from the show.

== Television and other projects ==
Beyond her musical career, Gilabert has participated in various television projects. In 2021, she served as a jury member on the À Punt program "Duel de veus" and was part of the professional jury representing Spain at the Eurovision Song Contest 2021.

In 2023, she participated in the television show "Dúos increíbles", where she reached the final as runner-up alongside David Summers of Hombres G.

== Personal life ==
Gilabert has been in a relationship with Spanish actor Alejandro Vergara since 2024. Vergara is known for his role in the television series La Promesa. The couple confirmed their relationship publicly in January 2025.

Previously, Gilabert was in a relationship with fellow Operación Triunfo contestant Flavio Fernández from 2020 to 2023.

== Discography ==
=== With Cactus ===
- Cactus (2018)
- Roma (2019)

=== Studio albums ===
- Antídoto (2021)

=== EPs ===
- Nada (2020)

=== Singles ===
- "Sin Más" (2020)
- "Quiero Que Vuelvas" (2020)
- "Espere Que Tornes" (2020)
- "No pasa nada" (2020)
- "Un poquito" (feat. Lérica) (2020)
- "Mar de dudas" (2021)
- "La Partida" (2021)
- "Soc la d'ahir" (2021)
- "Mi Pecado Favorito" (2022)
- "M'han Robat El Sol" (2022)
- "Me encontré" (2022)
- "Harta de mí" (2023)
- "Pa que estemos juntos" (feat. Despistaos) (2023)
- "4 vents" (2023)
- "Vuelvo a caer" (2025)
