= Aitana discography =

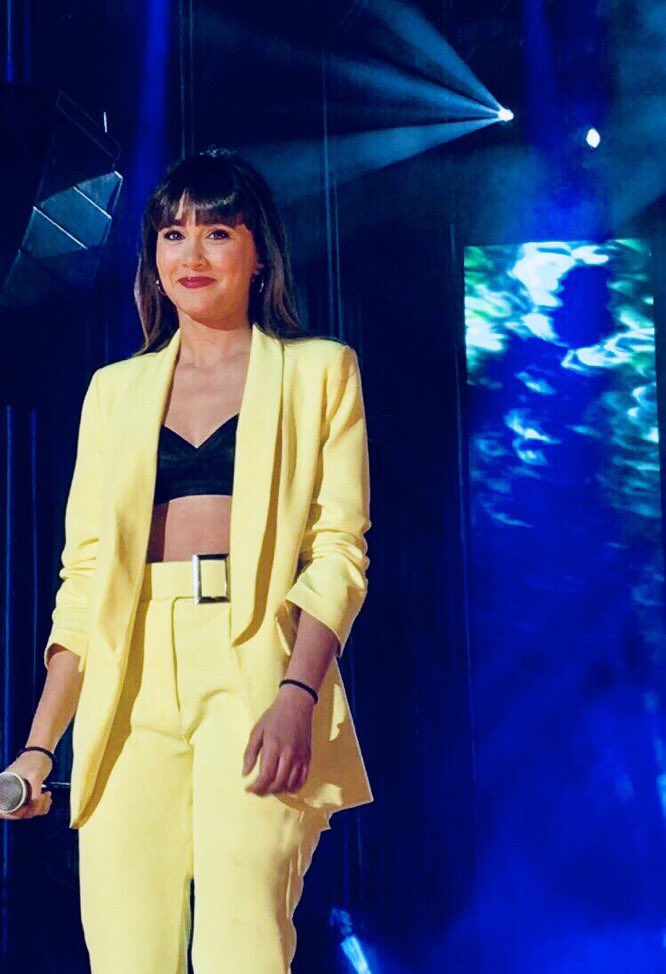
- Aitana performing in Málaga in 2018
- Studio albums: 4
- EPs: 1
- Soundtrack albums: 1
- Singles: 37
- Video albums: 1
- Promotional singles: 9

The discography of Spanish recording artist Aitana consists of four studio albums, one soundtrack album, one compilation album, one extended play, thirty-five singles, and nine promotional singles.

Throughout her career, Aitana's has accumulated a total amount of five number ones, thirty top 10 hits and 92 songs debut on the charts.

Her first professionally released single «Lo malo», a collaboration with fellow singer Ana Guerra became a major chart success in Spain, reaching number one and appearing as well in some other charts across the globe as Venezuela or Ecuador. Aitana's debut solo single «Teléfono» became the singer's breakthrough hit, debuting atop the PROMUSICAE Top 100 chart. Following single «Vas a quedarte» debuted atop the chart as well. Becoming the first single to archived a three number one strike on the country since the Top 100 is published. Following singles from her debut studio album Spoiler (2019) would reach the top 10 as well.

== Albums ==
=== Studio albums ===
List of studio albums, with selected details
Title	Details	Peaks			Certifications
Title	Details	SPA	POR	US Latin Pop	Certifications
Spoiler	Released: 7 June 2019; Label: Universal Spain; Formats: CD, digital download, streaming	1	—	—	PROMUSICAE: Platinum
11 Razones	Released: 11 December 2020; Label: Universal Spain; Format: CD, LP, box set, digital download, streaming	1	—	—	PROMUSICAE: 2× Platinum; CAPIF: Platinum; PROFOVI: Platinum
Alpha	Released: 22 September 2023; Label: Universal Spain; Format: CD, LP, box set, cassette, digital download, streaming	1	—	—	PROMUSICAE: 3× Platinum
Cuarto Azul	Released: 30 May 2025; Label: Universal Spain; Format: CD, LP, box set, cassette, digital download, streaming	1	150	12	PROMUSICAE: 4× Platinum
"—" denotes a recording that did not chart or was not released in that territory.

=== Soundtrack albums ===
List of studio albums, with selected details
Title	Details	Peaks	Certifications
Title	Details	SPA	Certifications
La Última	Released: 2 December 2022; Label: Hollywood Records; Formats: CD, digital download, streaming	4	PROMUSICAE: Gold

=== Compilation albums ===
List of compilation albums, with selected details, chart positions and certifications
Title	Details	Peaks
Title	Details	SPA
Sus Canciones (Operación Triunfo 2017)	Released: 16 March 2018; Label: Universal Spain; Formats: CD, digital download, streaming	2

=== Video releases ===
List of video releases with selected details
Title	Live album details
Play Tour: En Directo	Released: 24 July 2020; Label: Universal Spain; Formats: CD, DVD

== Extended plays ==
List of EPs, with selected details, chart positions and certifications
Title	EP details	Peaks	Certifications
Title	EP details	SPA	Certifications
Tráiler	Released: 30 November 2018; Label: Universal Spain; Formats: CD, digital download, streaming	1	PROMUSICAE: Platinum; PROFOVI: Gold

== Singles ==
=== As lead artist ===
==== 2010s ====
List of singles as lead artist in the 2010s, showing selected chart positions, certifications, and associated albums
Title	Year	Peak chart positions							Certifications	Album
Title	Year	SPA	COL	ECU	MEX	PAN	PAR	VEN	Certifications	Album
"Lo Malo" (with Ana Guerra or remix featuring Greeicy and Tini)	2018	1	—	97	—	— (Note: "Lo Malo" did not enter the Monitor Latino Panama Top 20 airplay chart, but peaked at number six on the Panama Top 20 Pop airplay chart.)	—	27	PROMUSICAE: 5× Platinum; IFPI ECU: Gold; RIAA: Gold (Latin)	Sus Canciones (Operación Triunfo 2017)
"Teléfono" (solo or remix with Lele Pons)	2018	1	46	—	—	— (Note: "Teléfono" did not enter the Monitor Latino Panama Top 20 airplay chart, but peaked at number 11 on the Panama Top 20 Pop airplay chart.)	—	75	PROMUSICAE: 4× Platinum; AMPROFON: Platinum+Gold; IFPI ECU: Gold; RIAA: Platinum (Latin)	Tráiler and Spoiler
"Vas a Quedarte"	2018	1	—	—	—	—	—	—	PROMUSICAE: 4× Platinum; AMPROFON: Platinum+Gold; CAPIF: Gold	Tráiler and Spoiler
"Presiento" (with Morat)	2019	9	68	13	10	15	—	2	PROMUSICAE: 4× Platinum; AMPROFON: Platinum+Gold	Balas Perdidas
"Nada Sale Mal"	2019	4	—	—	—	—	—	—	PROMUSICAE: Gold	Spoiler
"Con La Miel en Los Labios"	2019	6	—	—	—	—	—	—	PROMUSICAE: 2× Platinum; AMPROFON: Gold	Spoiler
"Me Quedo" (with Lola Indigo)	2019	6	—	—	—	—	—	—	PROMUSICAE: 2× Platinum	Spoiler
"+" (with Cali y El Dandee)	2019	2	—	8	—	— (Note: "+" did not enter the Monitor Latino Panama Top 20 airplay chart, but peaked at number four on the Panama Top 20 Pop airplay chart.)	11	—	PROMUSICAE: 3× Platinum; AMPROFON: 2× Platinum+Gold; CAPIF: Gold; UNIMPRO: Platinum	11 Razones
"—" denotes a recording that did not chart or was not released in that territory.

==== 2020s ====
List of singles as lead artist in the 2020s, showing selected chart positions, certifications, and associated albums
Title	Year	Peak chart positions										Certifications	Album
Title	Year	SPA	ARG	COL	ECU	MEX	PAN	PER	URU	US Latin	WW	Certifications	Album
"Si Tú La Quieres" (with David Bisbal)	2020	13	— (Note: "Si Tú La Quieres" did not enter the Billboard Argentina Hot 100, but peaked at number 16 on the Argentina Airplay chart.)	—	—	12	14	—	8	—	—	PROMUSICAE: 4× Platinum; AMPROFON: 2× Platinum+Gold; RIAA: 2× Platinum (Latin)	En Tus Planes
"Enemigos" (with Reik)	2020	11	—	—	—	—	— (Note: "Enemigos" did not enter the Monitor Latino Panama Top 20 airplay chart, but peaked at number eight on the Panama Top 20 Pop airplay chart.)	—	—	—	—	PROMUSICAE: Platinum	Non-album singles
"Más De Lo Que Aposté" (with Morat)	2020	21	—	—	—	—	7	—	—	—	—	PROMUSICAE: Platinum; AMPROFON: Platinum	Non-album singles
"Corazón Sin Vida" (with Sebastián Yatra)	2020	4	74	—	—	—	15	—	—	—	—	PROMUSICAE: 2× Platinum; AMPROFON: Platinum; IFPI ECU: Gold; UNIMPRO: Gold	11 Razones
"Friend de Semana" (with Danna Paola and Luísa Sonza)	2020	—	—	—	—	10	12	—	—	—	—		K.O.
"11 Razones"	2020	15	—	—	—	—	—	—	—	—	—	PROMUSICAE: 2× Platinum	11 Razones
"Aunque No Sea Conmigo" (with Evaluna Montaner)	2021	55	—	—	—	—	—	—	—	—	—	PROMUSICAE: Gold	Non-album singles
"Mon Amour (Remix)" (with Zzoilo)	2021	1	22	36	1	5	— (Note: "Mon Amour (Remix)" did not enter the Monitor Latino Panama Top 20 airplay chart, but peaked at number nine on the Panama Top 20 Pop airplay chart.)	2	1	— (Note: "Mon Amour (Remix)" did not enter the Billboard Hot Latin Songs, but it peaked at number 20 on the Latin Pop Airplay chart.)	73	PROMUSICAE: 10× Platinum; AMPROFON: 3× Diamond; CAPIF: Platinum; PROFOVI: Platinum	Non-album singles
"Berlín"	2021	15	—	—	—	—	—	—	—	—	—	PROMUSICAE: 2× Platinum	Non-album singles
"Llueve sobre mojado" (with Pablo Alborán and Alvaro De Luna)	2021	42	—	—	—	— (Note: "Llueve sobre mojado" did not enter the Billboard Mexico Airplay chart, but peaked at number 19 on the Mexico Espanol Airplay chart.)	— (Note: "Llueve sobre mojado" did not enter the Monitor Latino Panama Top 20 airplay chart, but peaked at number 17 on the Panama Top 20 Pop airplay chart.)	—	—	—	—	PROMUSICAE: Platinum	La Cuarta Hoja
"Coldplay" (with Cali y El Dandee)	2021	62	—	—	—	—	— (Note: "Coldplay" did not enter the Monitor Latino Panama Top 20 airplay chart, but peaked at number 17 on the Panama Top 20 Pop airplay chart.)	—	—	—	—		Malibu
"Formentera" (with Nicki Nicole)	2021	3	53	—	— (Note: "Formentera" did not enter the Monitor Latino Ecuador Top 20 airplay chart, but peaked at number 13 on the Ecuador Top 20 Pop airplay chart.)	— (Note: "Formentera" did not enter the Billboard Mexico Songs chart, but peaked at number 6 on the Monitor Latino Mexico Pop Airplay chart.)	— (Note: "Formentera" did not enter the Monitor Latino Panama Top 20 airplay chart, but peaked at number nine on the Panama Top 20 Pop airplay chart.)	—	—	—	—	PROMUSICAE: 7× Platinum; CAPIF: Gold	Alpha
"En El Coche"	2022	3	— (Note: "En El Coche" did not enter the Billboard Argentina Hot 100, but peaked at number 15 on the Argentina Airplay chart.)	—	— (Note: "En El Coche" did not enter the Monitor Latino Ecuador Top 20 airplay chart, but peaked at number 18 on the Ecuador Top 20 Pop airplay chart.)	—	—	— (Note: "En El Coche" did not enter the Monitor Latino Peru Top 20 airplay chart, but peaked at number six on the Peru Top 20 Pop airplay chart.)	—	—	—	PROMUSICAE: 2× Platinum	Alpha
"La Canción Que No Quiero Cantarte" (with Amaia)	2022	59	—	—	—	—	—	—	—	—	—	PROMUSICAE: Gold	Cuando No Sé Quién Soy
"Mariposas" (with Sangiovanni)	2022	10	—	—	—	—	—	—	—	—	—	PROMUSICAE: 5× Platinum	Non-album singles
"Quieres" (with Emilia and Ptazeta)	2022	20	75	—	—	—	—	—	9	—	—	PROMUSICAE: 2× Platinum	Non-album singles
"Otra Vez"	2022	40	—	—	—	—	—	—	—	—	—	PROMUSICAE: Gold	Non-album singles
"La Última"	2022	81	—	—	—	—	—	—	—	—	—	PROMUSICAE: Gold	La Última
"Los Ángeles"	2023	3	76	—	— (Note: "Los Ángeles" did not enter the Monitor Latino Ecuador Top 20 airplay chart, but peaked at number 14 on the Ecuador Top 20 Pop airplay chart.)	—	9	— (Note: "Los Ángeles" did not enter the Monitor Latino Peru Top 20 airplay chart, but peaked at number three on the Peru Top 20 Pop airplay chart.)	17	—	—	PROMUSICAE: 3× Platinum	Alpha
"Las Babys"	2023	6	— (Note: "Las Babys" did not enter the Billboard Argentina Hot 100, but peaked at number 19 on the Argentina Airplay chart.)	—	14	—	17	— (Note: "Las Babys" did not enter the Monitor Latino Peru Top 20 airplay chart, but peaked at number four on the Peru Top 20 Pop airplay chart.)	17	—	—	PROMUSICAE: 4× Platinum	Alpha
"Mi Amor" (with Rels B)	2023	9	— (Note: "Mi Amor" did not enter the Billboard Argentina Hot 100, but peaked at number 16 on the Argentina Airplay chart.)	—	—	— (Note: "Mi Amor" did not enter the Billboard Mexico Songs chart, but peaked at number 10 on the Monitor Latino Mexico Pop Airplay chart.)	— (Note: "Mi Amor" did not enter the Monitor Latino Panama Top 20 airplay chart, but peaked at number ten on the Panama Top 20 Pop airplay chart.)	— (Note: "Mi Amor" did not enter the Monitor Latino Peru Top 20 airplay chart, but peaked at number 13 on the Peru Top 20 Pop airplay chart.)	—	—	—	PROMUSICAE: 2× Platinum	Alpha
"AQYNE" (with Danna Paola)	2023	33	—	—	—	— (Note: "AQYNE" did not enter the Billboard Mexico Songs chart, but peaked at number 5 on the Monitor Latino Mexico Pop Airplay chart.)	—	—	—	—	—	PROMUSICAE: Gold	Alpha
"Akureyri" (with Sebastián Yatra)	2024	8	—	—	—	—	—	—	—	—	—	PROMUSICAE: Gold	Non-album singles
"Hermosa Casualidad" (with Sen Senra)	2024	28	—	—	—	—	—	—	—	—	—	PROMUSICAE: Gold	Non-album singles
"4to 23"	2024	15	—	—	—	—	—	—	—	—	—		Non-album singles
"Gran vía" (with Quevedo)	2024	1	—	—	—	—	—	— (Note: "Gran Vía" did not enter the Monitor Latino Peru Top 20 airplay chart, but peaked at number 14 on the Peru Top 20 Pop airplay chart.)	—	—	—	PROMUSICAE: 4× Platinum	Buenas Noches
"Segundo Intento"	2025	18	— (Note: "Segundo Intento" did not enter the Billboard Argentina Hot 100, but peaked at number 14 on the Argentina Airplay chart.)	—	— (Note: "Segundo Intento" did not enter the Monitor Latino Ecuador Top 20 airplay chart, but peaked at number eight on the Ecuador Top 20 Pop airplay chart.)	— (Note: "Segundo Intento" did not enter the Billboard Mexico Songs chart, but peaked at number 19 on the Monitor Latino Mexico Pop Airplay chart.)	— (Note: "Segundo Intento" did not enter the Monitor Latino Panama Top 20 airplay chart, but peaked at number 11 on the Panama Top 20 Pop airplay chart.)	— (Note: "Segundo Intento" did not enter the Monitor Latino Peru Top 20 Airplay chart, but peaked at number 19 on the Peru Top 20 Pop Airplay chart.)	—	—	—	PROMUSICAE: Platinum	Cuarto Azul
"Sentimiento Natural" (with Myke Towers)	2025	7	—	—	— (Note: "Sentimiento Natural" did not enter the Monitor Latino Ecuador Top 20 airplay chart, but peaked at number seven on the Ecuador Top 20 Pop airplay chart.)	—	—	— (Note: "Sentimiento Natural" did not enter the Monitor Latino Peru Top 20 airplay chart, but peaked at number 17 on the Peru Top 20 Pop airplay chart.)	—	—	—	PROMUSICAE: Gold	Cuarto Azul
"6 de Febrero"	2025	2	27	—	—	—	—	— (Note: "6 de Febrero" did not enter the Monitor Latino Peru Top 20 Airplay chart, but peaked at number 16 on the Peru Top 20 Pop Airplay chart.)	15	—	—	PROMUSICAE: 3× Platinum	Cuarto Azul
"Cuando Hables con Él"	2025	4	—	—	—	—	—	—	—	—	—	PROMUSICAE: Platinum	Cuarto Azul
"Superestrella"	2025	2	2	8	1	2	7	3	1	18	53	PROMUSICAE: 6× Platinum; PROFOVI: Gold; RIAA: Platinum (Latin)	Cuarto Azul
"Conexión Psíquica"	2026	20	—	—	—	— (Note: "Conexión Psíquica" did not enter the Billboard Mexico Songs chart, but peaked at number nine on the Monitor Latino Mexico Pop Airplay chart.)	—	—	—	—	—	PROMUSICAE: Platinum	Cuarto Azul
"—" denotes a recording that did not chart or was not released in that territory.

=== Promotional singles ===
List of promotional singles with chart positions, certifications and album name
Title	Year	Peaks	Certifications	Album
Title	Year	SPA	Certifications	Album
"Arde"	2018	15	PROMUSICAE: Gold	Sus Canciones (Operación Triunfo 2017)
"Tu Foto del DNI" (Marmi with Aitana)	2020	5	PROMUSICAE: 2× Platinum	Non-album single
"Volaré"	2020	—		Más Allá de La Luna
"Resilient (Tiësto Remix)" (Katy Perry and Tiësto featuring Aitana)	2020	56		Non-album singles
"Ni Una Más"	2021	37	PROMUSICAE: Gold	Non-album singles
"Mándame un Audio (Remix)" (Fresquito y Mango with Aitana)	2021	63	PROMUSICAE: Gold	Non-album singles
"Las Dudas" (Sebastián Yatra with Aitana)	2022	92	PROMUSICAE: Gold	Dharma
"Sálvame" (Moderatto with Aitana)	2022	—		Rockea Bien Duro
"Like I Can" (Sam Smith featuring Aitana)	2024	45		In The Lonely Hour (10th Anniversary Edition)
"—" denotes a recording that did not chart or was not released in that territory.

=== Charity singles ===
List of charity singles showing certifications, and notes
Title	Year	Certifications	Notes
"Himno a la Alegría" (among various artists)	2021	PROMUSICAE: Gold	To bring light and hope during the COVID-19 pandemic. (Note: In April 2021, Sony Music Spain, Universal Music Spain and Warner Music Spain teamed up to release a new version of the 1969 Miguel Ríos's song "Himno a la Alegría" to bring light and hope during the COVID-19 pandemic and to pay tribute to its frontline heroes. The track includes vocals by Ríos, Aitana, Lali, Alejandro Lerner, Alejandro Sanz, Alessia Cara, Alex Ubago, Ana Mena, Andrés Calamaro, Andrés Dvicio, Antonio José, Antonio Orozco, Brian May, Camilo, Carlos Rivera, David Bisbal, Dulce Pontes, Draco, Fher Olvera, India Martínez, Joy, Juanes, Laura Pausini, Leire Martínez, Luis Cobos, Macaco, Malú, Manolo García, Manuel Carrasco, Mau y Ricky, Melendi, Mikel Izal, Nathy Peluso, Pablo Alborán, Pablo López, Rosario, Rozalén, Sebastián Yatra, Vanesa Martín.)

== Other charted and certified songs ==
List of other charted songs, with chart positions and certifications, showing year released and album name
Title	Year	Peaks	Certifications	Album
Title	Year	SPA	Certifications	Album
"No Puedo Vivir sin Ti" (with Cepeda)	2017	69	PROMUSICAE: Gold	Sus Canciones (Operación Triunfo 2017)
"Chas! Y Aparezco a Tu Lado"	2018	77		Sus Canciones (Operación Triunfo 2017)
"Procuro Olvidarte"	2018	61		Sus Canciones (Operación Triunfo 2017)
"Chandelier"	2018	78		Sus Canciones (Operación Triunfo 2017)
"Con Las Ganas" (with Amaia)	2018	—	PROMUSICAE: Gold	Sus Canciones (Operación Triunfo 2017)
"Stupid"	2018	20		Tráiler
"Mejor que tú"	2018	8	PROMUSICAE: Gold	Tráiler
"Popcorn"	2018	13		Tráiler
"Las Vegas"	2019	53		Spoiler
"Perdimos la razón"	2019	64		Spoiler
"Barro y hielo"	2019	97		Spoiler
"No Te Has Ido y Ya Te Extraño"	2020	55	PROMUSICAE: Gold	11 Razones
"− (Menos)" (with Alvaro Diaz and Pole.)	2020	33	PROMUSICAE: Gold	11 Razones
"Estupidez" (with Beret)	2020	51		11 Razones
"× (Por)"	2020	71		11 Razones
"÷ (Dividido)"	2020	84		11 Razones
"Cuando Te Fuiste" (with Natalia Lacunza)	2020	30	PROMUSICAE: Gold	11 Razones
"Si No Vas a Volver"	2020	92	PROMUSICAE: Gold	11 Razones
"= (Igual)"	2020	86		11 Razones
"Otra Noche sin Ti"	2023	90		Alpha
"The Killers"	2023	91		Alpha
"Luna"	2023	76		Alpha
"2 Extraños"	2023	55		Alpha
"24 Rosas"	2023	62	PROMUSICAE: Gold	Alpha
"Duele Un Montón Despedirme de Ti" (with Jay Wheeler)	2025	15	PROMUSICAE: Platinum	Cuarto Azul
"¿Para Qué Volver?" (with Ela Taubert)	2025	38	PROMUSICAE: Gold	Cuarto Azul
"Cuarto Azul"	2025	32	PROMUSICAE: Gold	Cuarto Azul
"Desde Que Ya No Hablamos"	2025	36	PROMUSICAE: Gold	Cuarto Azul
"De 1 Beso a 2 Besos"	2025	56		Cuarto Azul
"Trankis" (with Barry B)	2025	44	PROMUSICAE: Gold	Cuarto Azul
"Música en El Cielo"	2025	58		Cuarto Azul
"Luz de La Mañana (Interlude)"	2025	81		Cuarto Azul
"En El Centro de La Cama"	2025	53		Cuarto Azul
"Ex Ex Ex" (with Kenia Os)	2025	31		Cuarto Azul
"Hoy Es Tu Cumpleaños" (with Danny Ocean)	2025	62		Cuarto Azul
"Lia"	2025	59	PROMUSICAE: Gold	Cuarto Azul
"La Chica Perfecta" (with Alaska)	2025	24	PROMUSICAE: Gold	Cuarto Azul

== Footnotes ==
Notes for peak chart positions

== Music videos ==
Year	Song	Other artist(s)	Director	Filming location(s)
2018	"Lo Malo"	Ana Guerra	Gus Carballo	Madrid
2018	"Teléfono"	None	Mauri D. Galiano	Madrid
2018	"Teléfono (Remix)"	Lele Pons	Anwar Jibawi	Los Angeles
2018	"Vas a Quedarte"	None	Alex Maruny	Madrid
2019	"Presiento"	Morat	Lyona	Madrid
2019	"Nada Sale Mal"	None	Willy Rodríguez	Madrid
2019	"Con La Miel en Los Labios"	None	Alex Maruny	Madrid
2019	"Me Quedo"	Lola Indigo	CANADA	Monegros Desert
2019	"+"	Cali Y El Dandee	Nuno Gomes	Buenos Aires
2020	"Si Tú La Quieres"	David Bisbal	Unknown	From home
2020	"Enemigos"	Reik	Laia López	From home
2020	"Más De Lo Que Aposté"	Morat	Gus Carballo	Bogotá / Madrid
2020	"Corazón Sin Vida"	Sebastián Yatra	Pablo Hernández	Miami / Madrid
2020	"Friend de semana"	Danna Paola; Luísa Sonza	Charlie Nelson	Mexico / Madrid
2020	"Resilient (Tiësto Remix)"	Katy Perry; Tiësto	Chloe Wallace	Unknown
2020	"11 Razones"	None	Jean Lafleur	Madrid

== Performances Sessions ==
Year	Song	Release
2020	«Teléfono (Acústico / 2019)»	17 April 2020
2020	«Con La Miel En Los Labios (Acústico / 2019)»	17 April 2020
2020	«Presiento (En Directo en el Palau Sant Jordi / 2019)»	24 July 2020
2020	«Vas A Quedarte (En Directo en el Palau Sant Jordi / 2019)»	24 July 2020
2020	«Corazón sin vida (Acústico)» (con Sebastián Yatra)	3 December 2020
2020	«+ (Acústico)»	18 December 2020
2021	«11 razones (Acústico)»	11 February 2021
2021	«Cuando te fuiste (En el Garaje)» (con Natalia Lacunza)	12 March 2021
2023	«Dararí (Amazon Music Performance)»	22 September 2023
2023	«Luna (Amazon Music Performance)»	5 October 2023
2023	«2 Extraños (Amazon Music Performance)»	12 October 2023
