= 11 Razones Tour =

2021–22 concert tour by Aitana

- Tour by Aitana
- Associated album: 11 Razones
- Start date: 1 July 2021
- End date: 20 December 2022
- Legs: 3
- No. of shows: 39 in Europe; 8 in Latin America; 47 in total

Aitana concert chronology
- Play Tour (2019); 11 Razones Tour (2021–22); Alpha Tour (2023)

11 Razones Tour is the second concert tour by Spanish singer Aitana to promote her sophomore album 11 Razones (2020). The tour began on 1 July 2021 in Barcelona and visited bullrings, parks, amphitheatres and indoor arenas. An extension to the tour, 11 Razones + Tour began in September 2022, visiting major concert venues in Spain and Latin America until 20 December 2022.

== Background ==
Following the release of the second studio album by Aitana, the singer announced the first nineteen dates of the corresponding concert tour on April 13, 2021, with tickets going on sale that same day. More concerts were announced in the upcoming weeks. On March 16, 2022, the singer revealed six dates for a second leg of the tour, 11 Razones + Tour, which is scheduled to begin in September. A second show in Madrid was announced two days after the general sale due to overwhelming demand. In May, Aitana announced three concerts in Mexico and, in July, four more dates in Latin America.

== Set list ==
This set list is representative of the July 1, 2021 show in Barcelona. It does not represent all concerts for the duration of the tour.

1. "11 razones"
2. "Cuando te fuiste"
3. "Mejor que tú"
4. "Corazón sin vida"
5. "Teléfono"
6. "Si no vas a volver"
7. "÷ (Dividido)"
8. "Ni una más"
9. "× (Por)"
10. "= (Igual)"
11. "Mándame un audio (Remix)"
12. "Enemigos"
13. "Presiento" / "Más de lo que aposté"
14. "Con la miel en los labios"
15. "- (Menos)"
16. "Hold" / "Smells Like Teen Spirit" (Nirvana cover)
17. "Resilient (Remix)"
18. "Si tú la quieres"
19. "No te has ido y ya te extraño"
20. "Me quedo"
21. "Tu foto del DNI"
22. "Vas a quedarte"
23. "+ (Más)"

Notes

- "Si no vas a volver" was only performed during the first show in Barcelona.
- "= (Igual)" was performed from the first show to the San Sebastián show.
- "Enemigos" was performed from the first show to the one in Avilés.
- "Hold" and "Smells Like Teen Spirit" were performed from the first show to the Murcia show.
- "No te has ido y ya te extraño" was performed from the first show to the Mairena del Aljarafe show.
- "Resilient (Remix)" was only performed during the first show in Barcelona and then added in the encore December shows.
- During the show in Vitoria, Aitana didn't perform "× (Por)".
- Starting with the San Sebastián show, "Berlín" was performed.
- Starting with the Úbeda show, "Mon Amour (Remix)" was performed.
- During the second show in Marbella and the one in Úbeda, Aitana performed "Aunque no sea conmigo".
- During the tour's encore December shows, Aitana performed "Formentera".

== Shows ==
List of 11 Razones Tour concerts showing date, city, country, venue, and attendance
Date (2021)	City	Country	Venue	Atendance	Revenue
1 July	Barcelona	Spain	Palau Reial de Pedralbes	1,788 / 1,788	$122,835
9 July	Valencia	Spain	Estadi Ciutat de València	3,873 / 4,000	$188,192
10 July	Benicàssim	Spain	Recinto Ferial	3,405 / 3,900	$169.613
16 July	Almería	Spain	Plaza de Toros	1,722 / 1,722	$85,610
17 July	Huelva	Spain	Foro Iberoamericano	1,458 / 1,458	$69,354
22 July	Marbella	Spain	Cantera de Nagüeles	1,901 / 2,500	$90,053
23 July	Alicante	Spain	Plaza de Toros	2,556 / 2,849	$127,509
29 July	Calvià	Spain	Antiguo Aquapark	3,169 / 3,169	$154,703
1 August	Algeciras	Spain	Plaza de Toros	1,977 / 2.000	$95,278
7 August	Roses	Spain	Ciutadella de Roses	1,585 / 1,585	$100,609
8 August	Calella de Palafrugell	Spain	Jardins del Cap Roig	1,620 / 1,620	$150,237
13 August	Alp	Spain	Aeròdrom de la Cerdanya	1,562 / 1,562	$118,213
15 August	Cuenca	Spain	Estadio Fuensanta	2,034 / 3,264	$107,014
17 August	Cádiz	Spain	Plaza de Toros	2,494 / 2,510	$123,785
20 August	Avilés	Spain	Oscar Niemeyer Cultural Centre	2,696 / 2,750	$120,625
24 August	Marbella	Spain	Cantera de Nagüeles	2,133 / 2,500	$92,163
27 August	Úbeda	Spain	Recinto Ferial	2,804 / 3,000	$92,605
28 August	Murcia	Spain	Plaza de Toros	3,032 / 3,032	$136,569
24 September	Mairena del Aljarafe	Spain	Recinto Hípico	2,574 / 2,578	$148,602
9 October	Granada	Spain	Palacio de los Deportes	3,719 / 3,872	$171,431
15 October (Note: The concert celebrated on October 15, 2021 at the Velódromo de Anoeta in San Sebastián, was originally scheduled for September 4, 2021.)	San Sebastián	Spain	Velódromo de Anoeta	3,824 / 5,414	$179,853
16 October	Bilbao	Spain	Bilbao Arena	3,589 / 3,650	$163,517
23 October	A Coruña	Spain	Coliseum da Coruña	3,000 / 3,000	$143,160
30 October (Note: The concert celebrated on October 30, 2021 at the Plaza de Toros in Logroño, was originally scheduled for September 3, 2021 but was postponed due to the singer suffering from laryngitis.)	Logroño	Spain	Plaza de Toros de La Ribera	3,968 / 4,322	$185,578
6 November	Santander	Spain	Palacio de Deportes de Santander	1,570 / 2,400	$81,332
13 November	Vitoria-Gasteiz	Spain	Fernando Buesa Arena	3,509 / 3,907	$160,967
20 November	Salamanca	Spain	Pabellón Sánchez Paraíso	4,107 / 4,564	$181,981
26 November	Zaragoza	Spain	Pabellón Príncipe Felipe	6,299 / 6,338	$281,357
27 November	Pamplona	Spain	Navarra Arena	3,891 / 3,891	$191,715
4 December	Barcelona	Spain	Palau Sant Jordi	13,386 / 13,386	$676,006
7 December	Madrid	Spain	WiZink Center	10,450 / 10,467	$453,823
Total				105,268	—

List of 11 Razones + Tour concerts showing date, city, country, venue, attendance and revenue
Date (2022)	City	Country	Venue	Attendance	Revenue
3 September	Barcelona	Spain	Palau Sant Jordi	15,367 / 15,367	$781,210
8 September	Valencia	Spain	Plaza de Toros	7,577 / 7,577	$453,679
10 September	Bilbao	Spain	Bizkaia Arena	13,061 / 13,101	$669,846
15 September	Seville	Spain	Estadio de la Cartuja	16,054 / 16,184	$785,387
16 September	Fuengirola	Spain	Marenostrum	14,373 / 16,464	$729,358
18 September	Madrid	Spain	WiZink Center	27,346 / 27,346	$1,403,427
22 September	Madrid	Spain	WiZink Center	27,346 / 27,346	$1,403,427
11 October	Guadalajara	Mexico	Teatro Diana	1,419 / 2,000	$58,124
14 October	Mexico City	Mexico	Teatro Metropólitan	2,023 / 3,124	$124,341
16 November	Santiago	Chile	Teatro Caupolican	—	—
19 November	Buenos Aires	Argentina	Teatro Gran Rex	—	—
20 November	Buenos Aires	Argentina	Teatro Gran Rex	—	—
22 November	Córdoba	Argentina	Espacio Quality	—	—
26 November	Montevideo	Uruguay	Palacio Peñarol	—	—
20 December	Madrid	Spain	Wizink Center	14,947 / 15,573	$619,481

=== Cancelled shows ===
Date	City	Country	Venue	Reason	Ref.
8 September 2021	Córdoba	Spain	Plaza de Toros de los Califas	Voice resting due to laryngitis	
25 September 2021	Sanlúcar de Barrameda	Spain	Plaza de Toros del Pino	Laryngitis re-infection	
1 October 2021 (Note: The concert celebrated on October 1, 2021 at the Recinto Ferial in Santa Cruz de Tenerife, was originally scheduled for September 10, 2021 but was postponed due to the singer suffering from laryngitis.)	Santa Cruz	Spain	Recinto Ferial	Laryngitis re-infection	
2 October 2021 (Note: The concert celebrated on October 2, 2021 at the Gran Canaria Arena in Las Palmas de Gran Canaria, was originally scheduled for September 11, 2021 but was postponed due to the singer suffering from laryngitis.)	Las Palmas	Spain	Gran Canaria Arena	Laryngitis re-infection	
15 October 2022 (Note: The concert celebrated on October 15, 2022 at Parque Fundidora in Monterrey is part of Tecate Live Out.)	Monterrey	Mexico	Parque Fundidora	Logistical conflict	
