= Play Tour =

2019 concert tour by Aitana

- Tour by Aitana
- Associated albums: Spoiler
- Start date: June 22, 2019
- End date: December 21, 2019
- Legs: 1
- No. of shows: 28 in Europe; 28 in total

Aitana concert chronology
- OT 2017 en concierto (2018); Play Tour (2019); 11 Razones Tour (2021–22)

Play Tour is the debut concert tour headlined by Spanish singer Aitana to promote her debut album Spoiler. The tour began on June 22, 2019 in Murcia and has visited bullrings, parks, amphitheatres and arenas. An extension to the tour, title + Play Tour, was added on February 7, 2020 and was set to begin on May 23, 2020 in Valencia and to conclude on December 20 at the WiZink Center in Madrid comprising 37 concerts. However, on May 29, the singer announced the cancellation of the remaining tour stops. The Barcelona concert was recorded for the live album Play Tour: En Directo (2020).

== Background ==
At the beginning of 2019, Aitana hinted a solo tour via social media. On March 1, 2019, Aitana announced through her social media, her participation at the 2019 Cap Roig Festival, which made her fans think that her highly anticipated solo tour might only be a festival one. Those rumors increased when, six days later, the singer announced her headlining gig at the 2019 Universal Music Festival. On March 14, 2019, the singer was interviewed at the 2019 Premios Dial red carpet. There, she announced that her first solo tour would begin around summer. This will be her first headlining tour as her 2018 OT 2017 in concierto concert tour was a joint one with her Operación Triunfo mates. She also let the press know that she had no clue of what the dates were; that her record label was still planning the tour's route, In late March, she announced four intimate acoustic shows sponsored by Los40, which she called a "pre-tour familiar shows". On April 4, Aitana finally announced through her social media that her debut tour would be called "Play Tour" and that it would promotion her 2018 EP Tráiler, as well as her first studio album, which was released in June 2019. Its first 12 dates were announced that same day, Aitana's Play Tour began on June 22, 2019 at the Plaza de Toros, in Murcia. On June 3, Aitana announced her biggest concert to date at the Palau Sant Jordi, Spain's largest indoor arena which sold-out in less than five hours. This concert, as well as the Granada and the October show in Madrid were recorded for the tour documentary included in the album reissue Spoiler: Re-Play.

In December 2019, Aitana announced that an extension of the tour would be revealed earlier next year. Thus, on February 7, 2020 she announced the second part of it, which she named + Play Tour (in reference to her single "+") and revealed its first 6 dates. It was set to begin on May 23, 2020 at Valencia's bullring but was delayed due to the COVID-19 pandemic. This concert was set to take place on May 30 but was advanced for unknown reasons even though fans believe that the reason of the date change is the coincidence with a Miriam Rodríguez (fellow friend of Aitana) show in the city and then moved to September 13. Thus, the extension is set to begin on June 12 in Almería. More national and international dates will be announced throughout the year.

On May 29, 2020, Aitana announced that all the "+ Play Tour" dates besides de Madrid December concert were cancelled due to the ongoing pandemic. A new tour will be programmed for 2021. The remaining tour date in Madrid was reschudeled to December 7, 2021 as part of her new tour. The decision was announced on October 27.

== Critical and commercial reception ==
Different newspapers and music professionals have reviewed the singer's debut concert tour. They all agree that it is a "true musical party starring one of the best voices in the country" and that "the Catalan singer is able to show in her show, energy and feeling embraced in pope bases and melodies that pass through different genres, all of them under the umbrella of a mainstream sound, either in its more urban layer or in its more melodic themes where the Artist proves to have a special voice color".

The tour's most attended show to date was the August 22nd show in Fuengirola which attracted over 11,500 fans to the Marenostrum Castle Park, an outdoor venue with a makeshift amphitheatre. When the tickets for the October shows in Madrid and Barcelona were made available on August 21, 2019, both sold-out in less than a day. Therefore, more tickets were released to meet the demand. Almost every show of the tour surpasses the 75% of attendance. When tickets for the final show in the WiZInk Center were released on February 14, 2020, over 80% of the tickets were sold in less than a day, which pushed the singer and her team to expand the ticket offer.

== Recordings ==
Every tour stop had its own mini documentary, which was less than two minutes long. Those were posted on YouTube some time after the concert took place and follows Aitana backstage, walking down the city, getting ready and performing. At the end of the tour's first leg, multiple shows were recorded in order to make an extense tour special documentary. This one was included in the Spoiler reissue, Spoiler: Re-Play, released exclusively in physical editions on December 20, 2019. This documentary in particular includes footage from the arena shows in Madrid, Barcelona and Granada, which took place between October and December of that year.

On July 24, 2020, Aitana's first live album and DVD will be released in physical stores under the name Play Tour: En Directo. This one captures the singer's biggest concert yet, the Palau Sant Jordi gig in Barcelona. On November 6, 2020, a short documentary titled "Play Tour: Detrás de las Luces" premiered on Movistar +.

== Set list ==
1. "Teléfono"
2. "Stupid"
3. "Mejor que tú"
4. "Perdimos la razón"
5. "Barro y hielo"
6. "Las Vegas"
7. "Arde"
8. "Nada sale mal"
9. "Presiento"
10. "Someone Like You" (Adele cover)
11. "Popcorn"
12. "Cristal"
13. "Chandelier" (Sia cover)
14. "Issues" (Julia Michaels cover)
15. "Bang Bang" (Jessie J, Ariana Grande and Nicki Minaj cover)
16. "Con la miel en los labios"
17. "Hold"
18. "Vas a quedarte"
19. "Me quedo"
20. "Procuro Olvidarte" (Alejandro Fernández cover)
21. "Lo malo"
Notes
- During the show in Alicante, Aitana performed "Me quedo" alongside Lola Índigo.
- During the show in Alcalá de Henares, "Presiento" was performed alongside Morat.
- During the September show in Seville, Aitana performed "Vas a quedarte" alongside Antonio José.
- During the Palacio Vistalegre show in Madrid, Aitana performed "Lo malo" alongside Ana Guerra.
- During the show in Barcelona, "Barro y hielo" was performed alongside Alfred García.

== Tour dates ==
List of concerts, showing date, city, country, venue, tickets sold, number of available tickets, and amount of gross revenue
| Date | City | Country | Venue | Attendance | Revenue |
Europe
| June 22, 2019 | Murcia | Spain | Plaza de Toros de Murcia | 4,558 / 7,354 | $213,464 |
| June 29, 2019 | Ourense | Spain | Explanada de Expourense | 3,098 / 3,410 | $93,430 |
| July 6, 2019 | Palma | Spain | Son Fusturet | 3,615 / 5,090 | $148,197 |
| July 13, 2019 | A Coruña | Spain | Coliseum da Coruña | 4,181 / 5,847 | $216,420 |
| July 19, 2019 (Note: The concert on July 19, 2019 at the Jardins de Terramar in Sitges is part of the 2019 Festival Jardins de Terramar.) | Sitges | Spain | Jardins de Terramar | 2,291 / 2,291 | $124,005 |
| July 23, 2019 (Note: The concert on July 23, 2019 at the Gran Fira de Valencia in Valencia is part of the 2019 Concerts de Vívers concert series.) | Valencia | Spain | Jardins de Vivers | 4,811 / 4,811 | $216,172 |
| July 26, 2019 (Note: The concert on July 26, 2019 at the Parque Hermanos Castro in Gijón is part of the 2019 Gijón Life music festival.) | Gijón | Spain | Escuela de la Marina Civil | — | — |
| July 27, 2019 (Note: The concert on July 27, 2019 at the Campa de la Magdalena in Santander is part of the Magdalena en Vivo 2019.) | Santander | Spain | Campa de la Magdalena | 7,093 / 7,093 | $176,340 |
| July 31, 2019 (Note: The concert on July 31, 2019 at the Teatro Real in Madrid is part of the 2019 Universal Music Festival.) | Madrid | Spain | Teatro Real | 1,756 / 1,756 | $110,628 |
| August 3, 2019 (Note: The concert on August 3, 2019 at the Maestral Auditorium in Sanxenxo is part of the 2019 Maestral Music Festival.) | Sanxenxo | Spain | Maestral Auditorium | — | — |
| August 10, 2019 | Alicante | Spain | Plaza de Toros de Alicante | 6,286 / 6,620 | $309,458 |
| August 18, 2019 (Note: The concert on August 18, 2019 in Girona is part of the 2019 Cap Roig Festival.) | Calella de Palafrugell | Spain | Cap Roig Gardens | 2,118 / 2,118 | $102,157 |
| August 22, 2019 | Fuengirola | Spain | Marenostrum Music Castle | 11,785 / 14,052 | $512,428 |
| August 23, 2019 (Note: The August 23, 2019 at the Poblado de Sancti Petri in Chiclana de la Frontera, is part of the 2019 Concert Music Festival.) | Chiclana | Spain | Poblado de Sancti Petri | 4,107 / 4,519 | $173,755 |
| August 28, 2019 (Note: The August 28, 2019 concert at the Palacio Arzobispal in Alcalá de Henares, is part of the 2019 Conciertos de la Muralla concert series.) | Alcalá de Henares | Spain | Palacio Arzobispal | 4,042 / 4,042 | $147,745 |
| September 7, 2019 | Ponferrada | Spain | Auditorio Municipal | 4,717 / 6,050 | $117,925 |
| September 11, 2019 (Note: The September 11, 2019 concert at the Caseta de los Jardinillos in Albacete, is part of the 2019 Feria de Albacete.) | Albacete | Spain | Caseta de los Jardinillos | 4,836 / 5,022 | $129,470 |
| September 20, 2019 (Note: The September 20, 2019 concert at the Jardines de Lorca in Lorca, is part of the 2019 Feria de Lorca.) | Lorca | Spain | Jardines de Lorca | 8,917 / 8,917 | $237,479 |
| September 27, 2019 | Seville | Spain | Auditorio Rocío Jurado | 8,151 / 8,151 | $357,258 |
| October 4, 2019 | Córdoba | Spain | Plaza de Toros de Córdoba | 6,696 / 10,953 | $277,032 |
| October 6, 2019 | Zaragoza | Spain | Espacio City | — | — |
| October 11, 2019 | Madrid | Spain | Palacio Vistalegre | 9,942 / 9,942 | $497,654 |
| October 26, 2019 | Bilbao | Spain | Bilbao Arena | 6,629 / 6,875 | $277,432 |
| October 31, 2019 (Note: The concert on October 31, 2019 at the Cartuja Center in Seville, is part of the MTV Music Week supporting the 2019 MTV Europe Music Awards. Spanish rapper Don Patricio co-headlined the show.) | Seville | Spain | Cartuja Center | 2,012 / 2,012 | $50,572 |
| November 3, 2019 (Note: The November 3, 2019 concert at the Palau Sant Jordi in Barcelona was scheduled to take place on October 18 but was postponed due to the 2019 Catalan general strike summoned due to the final statement of the trial of Catalonia independence leaders.) | Barcelona | Spain | Palau Sant Jordi | 10,138 / 10,138 | $502,846 |
| December 14, 2019 | Granada | Spain | Palacio de los Deportes | 7,511 / 7,511 | $384,622 |
| December 21, 2019 | Tarragona | Spain | Tarraco Arena Plaza | — | — |
| Total | | | | — | — |

=== Cancelled shows ===
List of cancelled concerts, showing date, city, country, venue and reason for cancellation
| Date | City | Country | Venue | Reason |
|---|---|---|---|---|
| August 20, 2019 (Note: The concert on August 20, 2019 at the Recinto Deportivo Playa Sur in Peñíscola was supposed to be part of the 2019 Peñíscola From Stage Festival.) | Peñíscola | Spain | Recinto Deportivo Playa Sur | Weather conditions |
| June 2, 2020 | Barcelona | Spain | Real Club de Polo | COVID-19 pandemic in Spain |
| June 12, 2020 | Almería | Spain | Plaza de Toros | COVID-19 pandemic in Spain |
| June 27, 2020 (Note: The June 27, 2020 at the Estadio Gran Canaria in Las Palmas, is part of the 2020 Sun&Stars Festival.) | Las Palmas | Spain | Estadio Gran Canaria | COVID-19 pandemic in Spain |
| July 18, 2020 (Note: The July 18, 2020 at the Cantera de Nagüeles in Marbella, is part of the 2020 Starlite Festival.) | Marbella | Spain | Cantera de Nagüeles | COVID-19 pandemic in Spain |
| August 1, 2020 | Palma | Spain | Son Fusteret | COVID-19 pandemic in Spain |
| August 7, 2020 (Note: The August 7, 2020 at the Poblado de Sancti Petri in Chiclana de la Frontera, is part of the 2020 Concert Music Festival.) | Chiclana | Spain | Poblado de Sancti Petri | COVID-19 pandemic in Spain |
| August 9, 2020 (Note: The concert on August 9, 2020 in Cambrils is part of the 2020 Cambrils International Music Festival.) | Cambrils | Spain | Parc del Pinaret | COVID-19 pandemic in Spain |
| August 18, 2020 (Note: The concert on August 18, 2020 in Girona is part of the 2020 Cap Roig Festival.) | Calella de Palafrugell | Spain | Cap Roig Festival | COVID-19 pandemic in Spain |
| September 4, 2020 | Seville | Spain | Auditorio Rocío Jurado | COVID-19 pandemic in Spain |
| September 13, 2020 (Note: The September 13, 2020 concert at the Plaza de Toros in Valencia was scheduled to take place on May 23 but was postponed due to the COVID-19 pandemic.) | Valencia | Spain | Plaza de Toros | COVID-19 pandemic in Spain |
| October 10, 2020 | Murcia | Spain | La Condomina | COVID-19 pandemic in Spain |
| October 16, 2020 | Bilbao | Spain | Bilbao Arena | COVID-19 pandemic in Spain |
| December 20, 2020 | Madrid | Spain | WiZink Center | COVID-19 pandemic in Spain |
