= Play Tour: En Directo =

Video by Aitana
- Released: July 24, 2020
- Recorded: November 3, 2019
- Venue: Palau Sant Jordi, (Barcelona)
- Genre: Pop
- Length: 93:17
- Label: Universal Music

Play Tour: En Directo is the first video release by Spanish singer Aitana. The album features Aitana's set from her Play Tour concert at the Palau Sant Jordi in Barcelona, which took place on November 3, 2019. The album was released in physical stores on July 24, 2020 and features guest appearances from Alfred García. It was released on Movistar+ on November 6.

== Background ==
Aitana embarked on the Play Tour starting in June 2019 to support her debut album Spoiler (2019). That same month, the singer confirmed on El Hormiguero that her debut album would be reissued later that year, leading to Spoiler: Re-Play, a reedition of the album that features some acoustic performances and an extensive tour documentary, which follows the singer backstage, on her way to the gig, getting ready and, obviously, performing. This project was released exclusively in physical stores on December 20, 2019 and received moderate success.

The Play Tour suffered complications with the celebration of a second leg in Europe and a series of planned concerts in Latin America due to the outbreak of the COVID-19 pandemic. To guarantee the security of the assistants, all tour stops were cancelled in May 2020 only leaving the final concert in Madrid and another one in Marbella. On July 15, 2020, Universal Music confirmed the release of "Play Tour: En Directo", another extense [sic?] tour documentary that would follow Aitana during her concert at Barcelona's Palau Sant Jordi, Spain's largest indoor arena, which she sold out in less than a week in the context of her debut tour. The live album will be released exclusively in physical stores on July 24, 2020.

On release day the performances of "Presiento" and "Vas a Quedarte" were uploaded on the singer's YouTube channel.

== Track listing ==
Track listing adapted from Tidal. All tracks are noted as "live".

No.	Title	Writer(s)	Length
1.	"Intro"	Bob Gaudio
2.	"Teléfono"	Ocaña; Andrés Torres; Mauricio Rengifo
3.	"Stupid"	August Vinberg; Grace Tither; Jaramaye Daniels; Jeremy Dussolliett; Par Almqvist
4.	"Mejor Que Tú"	Eva Ruiz; Gonalez Abad; Gonzalo Duque; Molano; Pedro Malaver Turbay
5.	"Perdimos la Razón"	Ocaña; Zadley; Gozalez Abad; Gonzalo Duque; Molano
6.	"Barro Y Hielo"	Ocaña; Galván; Barros
7.	"Las Vegas"	Ocaña; Chris Zadley; Gonzalez Abad; Germán Gonzalo Duque; Molano; Deluchi
8.	"Arde"	Alba Reig
9.	"Nada Sale Mal"	Ocaña; Andy Clay; Luis Salazar; Mario Osorio
10.	"Presiento"	Ocaña; Juan Pablo Isaza Pineros; Juan Pablo Villamil; Martin Vargas Morales; Simón Vargas
11.	"Popcorn"	Ocaña; Tat Tong; Jovany Barreto
12.	"Cristal"	Ocaña; Jovany Javier; Tat Tong; Salmanzadeh
13.	"Issues / Bang Bang"	Julia Michaels; Benjamin Levin; Tor Erik Hermansen; Mikkel Storleer Eriksen; Justin Tranter; Max Martin; Savan Kotecha; Rickard Göransson
14.	"Con la miel en los labios"	Ocaña; Daniel Oriza Crespo; David Santisteban; Kai Etxaniz
15.	"Hold"	Ocaña; Kozze; Rob Russell; Sam Hanson
16.	"Vas a quedarte"	Ocaña; Juan Pablo Isaza; Juan Pablo Villamil
17.	"Me quedo"	Ocaña; Cristian Quirante Catalan; Felipe González Abad; Leticia Sala; Miriam Doblas Muñoz; Pablo Diaz Reixa
18.	"Lo malo"	Jessica Morgan; Will Simms; Brisa Fenoy
