= LOS40 Music Awards 2020 =

Spanish music awards ceremony

- Date: December 5, 2020
- Location: Madrid, Spain
- Presented by: Los 40

Highlights
- Most wins: Aitana, David Bisbal, Dua Lipa, Maluma (2 each)
- Most nominations: Aitana, Dua Lipa, The Weeknd, Maluma (4 each)
- Website: los40.com/tag/los40_music_awards/a/

Television/radio coverage
- Network: Divinity

The 15th edition of the LOS40 Music Awards was held on December 5, 2020. The ceremony was presented primarily from Madrid, Spain, but held without a live audience due to the ongoing COVID-19 pandemic. It featured performances from many parts of the world following the international protocole against COVID-19 propagation.

== Performing artists ==
The full lineup of performers was announced on November 24, 2020.

List of musical performances
Artist(s)	Song(s)
Pre-show
Natalia Lacunza	"Nuestro nombre"
Main show
Aitana	"Golden Slumbers"
David Bisbal	"Si tú la quieres"
C. Tangana; Niño de Elche; La Húngara	"Tú Me Dejaste De Querer"
Camilo	"Favorito"
Pablo Alborán	"Si hubieras querido"
David Otero; Taburete	"Una foto en blanco y negro"
Nil Moliner; Dani Fernández	"Soldadito de hierro"
Nea	"Some Say"
Pablo López	"Mariposa"
ELE	"Volverán esos momentos" "Tu granito de arena"
Tones and I	"Dance Monkey"
Ana Mena; Rocco Hunt; Fred De Palma	"A un paso de la luna" "Se iluminaba"
Bombai; Ana Guerra	"Robarte el corazón"
Lola Índigo	"4 Besos" "Trendy" "Santería"
Dani Martín	"Portales" "La mentira" "Avioncito de papel" (with Camilo)
Beret; Pablo Alborán	"Sueño"
Dua Lipa	"Levitating" "Physical"
Maluma	"Cielo a un diablo" "Parce" "Madrid" "Hawái"
Carlos Tarque	"Eso que tú me das" (tribute to Pau Donés)

Notes

- Although Aitana was announced as a performer, she couldn't attend the ceremony as she tested positive for COVID-19. Her opening performance was filmed in advance days before she tested positive.
- Morat could not be at the award ceremony due to travel related issues.

== Awards and nominations ==
The nominees were announced on a special broadcast on October 15, 2020.

Spain
Best Act	Best New Act
Aitana: David Otero; David Bisbal; Pablo Alborán; Dani Martín	Nil Moliner: Maikel Delacalle; Natalia Lacunza; Lérica; Miki Núñez
Best Album	Best Song
David Bisbal – En tus planes: Beret – Prisma; Dvicio – Impulso; Amaral – Salto al color; Estopa – Fuego	David Bisbal and Aitana – "Si tú la quieres": David Otero and Taburete – "Una foto en blanco y negro"; Pablo Alborán and Ava Max – "Tabú"; Nil Moliner and Dani Fernández – "Soldadito de hierro"; Aitana and Cali y El Dandee – "+"
Best Video	Del 40 al 1 Artist Award
Pablo Alborán and Ava Max – "Tabú": Dani Martín – "La mentira"; Lola Índigo, Rauw Alejandro and Lalo Ebratt – "4 besos"; Pablo López – "Mariposa"; Aitana and Reik – "Enemigos"	Morat: Fred De Palma & Ana Mena; Dani Fernández; Dvicio; Beret
International
Best Act	Best New Act
Dua Lipa: The Weeknd; Lady Gaga; Harry Styles; Black Eyed Peas	Aya Nakamura: Lewis Capaldi; Tones and I; Nea; Doja Cat
Best Album	Best Song
Dua Lipa – Future Nostalgia: Harry Styles – Fine Line; The Weeknd – After Hours; Lady Gaga – Chromatica; Lewis Capaldi – Divinely Uninspired to a Hellish Extent	Tones and I – "Dance Monkey": Black Eyed Peas and J Balvin – "Ritmo"; The Weeknd – "Blinding Lights"; Lewis Capaldi – "Before You Go"; Dua Lipa – "Don't Start Now"
Best Video	Best Dance Act
The Weeknd – "Blinding Lights": Lady Gaga and Ariana Grande – "Rain on Me"; Ava Max – "Kings & Queens"; Tones and I – "Dance Monkey"; Dua Lipa – "Physical"	Nea: Topic; Joel Corry; Regard; Surf Mesa
Latin
Best Act	Best New Act
Maluma: Morat; Anitta; Danna Paola; Sebastián Yatra	Camilo: Rauw Alejandro; Omar Montes; Nicki Nicole; Jay Wheeler
Best Urban Act	Best Song
C. Tangana: Bad Bunny; Karol G; Maluma; Ozuna	Maluma – "Hawái": Karol G and Nicki Minaj – "Tusa"; Camilo – "Favorito"; Rauw Alejandro and Camilo – "Tattoo"; J Balvin – "Rojo"
Best Video
Karol G and Nicki Minaj – "Tusa": J Balvin – "Rojo"; Maluma – "Hawái"; Bad Bunny – "Yo Perreo Sola"; Rosalía and Travis Scott – "TKN"
Golden Music Award
Pau Donés; Dani Martín
