= List of number-one singles of 2018 (Spain) =

This lists the singles that reached number one on the Spanish PROMUSICAE sales and airplay charts in 2018. Total sales correspond to the data sent by regular contributors to sales volumes and by digital distributors.

== Chart history ==
Week	Issue date	Top Streaming, Downloads & Physical Sales			Most Airplay		
Week	Issue date	Artist(s)	Song	Ref.	Artist(s)	Song	Ref.
1	January 4	Luis Fonsi featuring Demi Lovato	"Échame la Culpa"		Camila Cabello featuring Young Thug	"Havana"	
2	January 11	Luis Fonsi featuring Demi Lovato	"Échame la Culpa"		Ed Sheeran and Beyoncé	"Perfect"	
3	January 18	Luis Fonsi featuring Demi Lovato	"Échame la Culpa"		Ed Sheeran and Beyoncé	"Perfect"	
4	January 25	Luis Fonsi featuring Demi Lovato	"Échame la Culpa"		Camila Cabello featuring Young Thug	"Havana"	
5	February 1	Luis Fonsi featuring Demi Lovato	"Échame la Culpa"		Ed Sheeran and Beyoncé	"Perfect"	
6	February 8	Aitana and Ana Guerra	"Lo malo"		Morat and Juanes	"Besos en guerra"	
7	February 15	Daddy Yankee	"Dura"		Luis Fonsi featuring Demi Lovato	"Échame la Culpa"	
8	February 22	Bad Bunny	"Amorfoda"		Luis Fonsi featuring Demi Lovato	"Échame la Culpa"	
9	March 1	Bad Bunny	"Amorfoda"		Luis Fonsi featuring Demi Lovato	"Échame la Culpa"	
10	March 8	Bad Bunny	"Amorfoda"		Luis Fonsi featuring Demi Lovato	"Échame la Culpa"	
11	March 15	Nicky Jam and J Balvin	"X"		Ed Sheeran and Beyoncé	"Perfect"	
12	March 22	Nicky Jam and J Balvin	"X"		Ed Sheeran and Beyoncé	"Perfect"	
13	March 29	Nicky Jam and J Balvin	"X"		Charlie Puth	"How Long"	
14	April 5	Nicky Jam and J Balvin	"X"		Ed Sheeran and Beyoncé	"Perfect"	
15	April 12	Aitana and Ana Guerra	"Lo malo"		Ed Sheeran and Beyoncé	"Perfect"	
16	April 19	Aitana and Ana Guerra	"Lo malo"		Ed Sheeran and Beyoncé	"Perfect"	
17	April 26	Aitana and Ana Guerra	"Lo malo"		Aitana and Ana Guerra	"Lo malo"	
18	May 3	Aitana and Ana Guerra	"Lo malo"		Ed Sheeran and Beyoncé	"Perfect"	
19	May 10	Nio Garcia, Darell and Casper Magico	"Te Boté"		Selena Gomez and Marshmello	"Wolves"	
20	May 17	Nio Garcia, Darell and Casper Magico	"Te Boté"		Álvaro Soler	"La Cintura"	
21	May 24	Nio Garcia, Darell and Casper Magico	"Te Boté"		Álvaro Soler	"La Cintura"	
22	May 31	Nio Garcia, Darell and Casper Magico	"Te Boté"		Aitana and Ana Guerra	"Lo malo"	
23	June 7	Cepeda	"Esta vez"		Selena Gomez and Marshmello	"Wolves"	
24	June 14	Becky G and Natti Natasha	"Sin Pijama"		Álvaro Soler	"La Cintura"	
25	June 21	Becky G and Natti Natasha	"Sin Pijama"		Álvaro Soler	"La Cintura"	
26	June 28	Becky G and Natti Natasha	"Sin Pijama"		Álvaro Soler	"La Cintura"	
27	July 5	Becky G and Natti Natasha	"Sin Pijama"		Álvaro Soler	"La Cintura"	
28	July 12	Becky G and Natti Natasha	"Sin Pijama"		Calvin Harris and Dua Lipa	"One Kiss"	
29	July 19	Becky G and Natti Natasha	"Sin Pijama"		Álvaro Soler	"La Cintura"	
30	July 26	Becky G and Natti Natasha	"Sin Pijama"		Álvaro Soler	"La Cintura"	
31	August 2	Aitana	"Teléfono"		Marshmello and Anne-Marie	"Friends"	
32	August 9	Aitana	"Teléfono"		Álvaro Soler	"La Cintura"	
33	August 16	Aitana	"Teléfono"		Calvin Harris and Dua Lipa	"One Kiss"	
34	August 23	Aitana	"Teléfono"		Álvaro Soler	"La Cintura"	
35	August 30	Aitana	"Teléfono"		Calvin Harris and Dua Lipa	"One Kiss"	
36	September 6	Aitana	"Teléfono"		Calvin Harris and Dua Lipa	"One Kiss"	
37	September 13	Ozuna and Manuel Turizo	"Vaina Loca"		Melendi with Alejandro Sanz and Arkano	"Déjala que baile"	
38	September 20	Ozuna and Manuel Turizo	"Vaina Loca"		Melendi with Alejandro Sanz and Arkano	"Déjala que baile"	
39	September 27	Ozuna and Manuel Turizo	"Vaina Loca"		Calvin Harris and Dua Lipa	"One Kiss"	
40	October 4	6ix9ine featuring Anuel AA	"Bebe"		Eleni Foureira	"Fuego"	
41	October 11	DJ Snake featuring Selena Gomez, Ozuna and Cardi B	"Taki Taki"		Blas Cantó	"Él no soy yo"	
42	October 18	Bad Bunny featuring Drake	"Mía"		Eleni Foureira	"Fuego"	
43	October 25	Bad Bunny featuring Drake	"Mía"		Maroon 5	"Girls Like You"	
44	November 1	Bad Bunny featuring Drake	"Mía"		Maroon 5	"Girls Like You"	
45	November 8	Rosalía	"Di mi nombre"		Maroon 5	"Girls Like You"	
46	November 15	Rosalía	"Di mi nombre"		Maroon 5	"Girls Like You"	
47	November 22	Paulo Londra	"Adán y Eva"		Maroon 5	"Girls Like You"	
48	November 29	Paulo Londra	"Adán y Eva"		Clean Bandit featuring Demi Lovato	"Solo"	
49	December 6	Aitana	"Vas a quedarte"		Maroon 5	"Girls Like You"	
50	December 13	Paulo Londra	"Adán y Eva"		Beret	"Lo siento"	
51	December 20	Paulo Londra	"Adán y Eva"		Maroon 5	"Girls Like You"	
52	December 27	Paulo Londra	"Adán y Eva"		David Bisbal and Greeicy	"Perdón"	
