= Mon Amour (Zzoilo song) =

Single by Zzoilo and Aitana
- Language: Spanish
- English title: "My Love"
- Released: 30 December 2020; 17 August 2021 (remix)
- Recorded: October 2020
- Genre: Pop rap
- Length: 2:59
- Label: Universal
- Songwriters: Víctor Galindo Bovea; Zoilo Tuñón Rosa
- Producer: VGBase

Zzoilo singles chronology
"Mon Amour" (2020)	"Luces, Cámara, Acción" (2021)

Aitana singles chronology
"Aunque No Sea Conmigo" (2021)	"Mon Amour (Remix)" (2021)	"Berlín" (2021)

Alternative cover
- remix cover

"Mon Amour" is a song recorded by Spanish singer-songwriter Zzoilo. Written by himself alongside Víctor Galindo and produced by the latter, it was independently released as Zzoilo's debut single on December 30, 2020, from his upcoming debut studio album. After reaching an unexpected growth in streaming platforms during the following year, a remix featuring Spanish singer Aitana was released on August 17 through Universal Music to boost the record even more. Sung primarily in Spanish but also incorporating French, Euskara, Italian, Portuguese and English, lyrically, "Mon Amour" talks about being deeply in love with a partner. Zzoilo described the track as "good vibes and no drama".

The original solo version entered the Spanish charts in July, debuting at 71 and had peaked at five and was certified gold before the release of the remix. The duet version debuted at 58 with only two days of tracking. It eventually topped the chart for six consecutive weeks and was certified four times platinum. "Mon Amour" charted in Latin American countries during fall mainly through TikTok, entering the charts in Ecuador, Mexico etc., where the song peaked at number one on their respective Spotify Top 50 lists.

== Background ==
Originally conceived as a solo song, "Mon Amour" was written in one hour in the evening sometime in October 2020. Zzoilo stated to El Español that "it was born one night when he couldn't sleep, I picked up the guitar and started playing the four simplest chords in the world, with which the vast majority of catchy and simple songs have been written. The lyrics came to me alone. It was five in the morning and the lyrics started like this, although when I finished it, it was six o'clock and I changed it." After being sent to VGBases, a close friend of Tuñón, the track went through a lot of recording stages, trying a vast majority of genres to fit the lyrics from reggaeton to rap and acoustic. The final version was recorded in seven hours.

== Remix ==
After the song started to become more popular, singer Aitana tweeted the lyrics to the track on July 25. Both artists interacted on social media about a possible collaboration, which ended up being the remix to "Mon Amour". The Instagram private message conversation between the two is reflected in the single's cover. The duet was recorded in Madrid on July 30. Zzoilo later told the press that Aitana's work during 2020 and her sophomore album 11 Razones were a huge inspiration for the final conception of the song. He stated "we played her latest album because the drums seemed spectacular to us and we wanted to make the song in that style. In the end, it did not stay that way. But Aitana has been part of Mon Amour from the beginning". The remix was finally released on August 17 to commercial success.

== Commercial performance ==
"Mon Amour" has been charting on the Spanish music charts ever since July 5, 2021, and, on the week of August 13, it peaked at number five. The song was certified Gold that same week and Platinum the week after. The remix entered the chart at number 58 with only two days of tracking, jumping to the second position the following week. "Mon Amour (Remix)" reached the top position on the PROMUSICAE chart in its third week, becoming the number one song in the country for six consecutive weeks. It became Zzoilo's first-ever number one song and Aitana's fourth after "Lo Malo", "Teléfono" and "Vas a Quedarte". She hadn't had a number one song since 2018. Subsequently, the remix rose to number 1 on the Spotify Spain chart and entered the top 200 on the worldwide Spotify charts. In addition, in the week of September 25 it rose to number 1 on the list of Los 40.

== Live performances ==
Zzoilo performed "Mon Amour" on his gigs and concerts throughout the year. Aitana also added the track to the setlist of her 11 Razones Tour. They performed the song together for the first time during the singer's concert in Murcia. The first televised performance of "Mon Amour" happened during the 2021 Los40 Music Awards.

== Charts ==
=== Weekly charts ===
Weekly chart performance for "Mon Amour" (Remix version)
Chart (2021–2022)	Peak position
Argentina (Argentina Hot 100)	22
Argentina Airplay (Monitor Latino)	2
Bolivia (Billboard)	22
Chile Airplay (Monitor Latino)	6
Colombia (National-Report)	36
Colombia Airplay (Monitor Latino)	16
Costa Rica (Monitor Latino)	4
Dominican Republic Pop (Monitor Latino)	12
Ecuador (National-Report)	1
Ecuador Airplay (Monitor Latino)	1
Ecuador Songs (Billboard)	15
El Salvador (Monitor Latino)	3
Global 200 (Billboard)	73
Guatemala (Monitor Latino)	8
Honduras (Monitor Latino)	12
Mexico Airplay (Billboard)	1
Mexico Airplay (Monitor Latino)	7
Mexico Songs (Billboard)	5
Mexico Streaming (AMPROFON)	4
Panama (PRODUCE)	42
Panama Pop (Monitor Latino)	9
Paraguay (SGP)	14
Peru (Billboard)	11
Peru Airplay (Monitor Latino)	2
Puerto Rico (Monitor Latino)	17
Spain (PROMUSICAE)	1
Spain Songs (Billboard)	22
Uruguay (CUD)	7
Uruguay Airplay (Monitor Latino)	1
US Latin Pop Airplay (Billboard)	20
Venezuela Pop (Monitor Latino)	6

=== Year-end charts ===
2022 year-end chart performance for "Mon Amour"
Chart (2022)	Position
Global 200 (Billboard)	187

== Certifications ==
Certifications for "Mon Amour" (Remix version)
Region	Certification	Certified units/sales
Italy (FIMI)	Gold	50,000^{‡}
Mexico (AMPROFON)	3× Diamond	2,100,000^{‡}
Portugal (AFP)	3× Platinum	30,000^{‡}
Spain (PROMUSICAE)	11× Platinum	660,000^{‡}
Streaming
Central America (CFC)	Platinum	7,000,000^{†}
^{‡} Sales+streaming figures based on certification alone.^{†} Streaming-only figures based on certification alone.

== Release history ==
Country	Date	Version	Format	Label
Various	December 30, 2020	Solo	Digital download; streaming	Independent
Various	August 17, 2021	Remix	Digital download; streaming	Universal Music
Spain	August 26, 2021	Remix	Contemporary hit radio	Universal Music
