= Trailer =

Trailer may refer to:

== Transportation ==
- Trailer (vehicle), an unpowered vehicle pulled by a powered vehicle
  - Baggage trailer, a large flatbed baggage trolley
  - Bicycle trailer, a wheeled frame for hitching to a bicycle to tow cargo or passengers
  - Boat trailer to carry small boats
  - Horse trailer and other trailers designed to haul livestock
  - Semi-trailer, a trailer without a front axle
  - Travel trailer, or caravan, a type of recreational trailer designed to provide sleeping space
- Semi-trailer truck, the combination of a tractor unit and one or more semi-trailers

== Shelter ==
- Mobile home, a relocatable housing unit with wheels and a hitch.
- Portable classroom, a temporary classroom for schools with insufficient building capacity - not technically a trailer due to lack of wheels or hitch. This temporary shelter can be relocated with a trailer, but by definition, the structure itself is not a trailer.
- Construction trailer, relocatable temporary accommodation with wheels and hitch used for offices and building materials storage on construction sites.

== Computing ==
- Trailer (computing), data appended to a main block of data to facilitate its processing

== Multimedia ==
- Trailer (promotion), an advertisement, usually in the form of a brief excerpt or string of excerpts, for media work
  - Teaser trailer, a truncated version of a trailer meant to "tease" an upcoming work

== Music ==
- Trailer (album), a 1994 album from the Northern Irish musical group Ash
- Tráiler, 2018 extended play by Spanish singer Aitana
