= Más de lo que aposté =

2020 song by Aitana and Morat

"Más De Lo Que Aposté"

Single by Aitana and Morat
- Language: Spanish
- English title: "More Than I Bet"
- Released: July 30, 2020
- Recorded: February 2020
- Genre: Power pop
- Length: 3:25
- Label: Universal Music
- Songwriter(s): Aitana Ocaña; Andy Clay; Germán Gonzalo; Duque Molano; Juan Pablo Isaza Piñeros; Luis Salazar; Nicolás González; Pablo Benito; Valentina Rico; Juan Pablo Villamil Cortés
- Producer(s): Juan Pablo Isaza; Mapache

Aitana singles chronology
"Enemigos" (2020)	"Más De Lo Que Aposté" (2020)	"Corazón Sin Vida" (2020)

Morat singles chronology
"La Bella Y La Bestia" (2020)	"Más De Lo Que Aposté" (2020)	"Labios Rotos" (2020)

Music video
- "Más De Lo Que Aposté" on YouTube

"Más De Lo Que Aposté" (transl. "More Than I Bet") is a song recorded by Spanish singer Aitana in collaboration with Colombian band Morat. Produced by Juan Pablo Isaza and Mapache, the track was released on July 30, 2020 through Universal Music as a non-album single. This marks the second collaboration between the performers, the first one being "Presiento", released in 2019.

== Background ==
In January 2020, Aitana travelled to Los Angeles once again to work with producers such as Andy Clay or Andrés Torres. The singer flew back to Madrid the month after and had various studio sessions with Spanish-language musicians, including Juan Pablo Villamil, among others. "Más De Lo Que Aposté" was conceived in one of those sessions as a solo project. In May, AItana revealed to Los40 that her second studio album would be preceded by a small droplet era that would include a collaboration with David Bisbal, another one with Mexican trio Reik and a third one with Colombian group Piso 21 before the album release in October. This resulted in a remix of Bisbal's "Si Tú La Quieres" and the original song "Enemigos". The collaboration with the last mentioned was revealed to be dropping in July but, for a reason or another, was delayed or discarded. Aitana has also revealed that Morat jumped on the song during the COVID-19 lockdown in Spain and that she couldn't record her vocals until late May.

Aitana announced her second collaboration with Morat through social media on July 27 and shared a small teaser as well as the single's cover art and release date.

== Composition ==
The song was written by Andy Clay, Germán Gonzalo, Duque Molano, Juan Pablo Isaza Piñeros, Luis Salazar, Nicolás González, Pablo Benito, Valentina Rico, Juan Pablo Villamil Cortés and the singer herself and produced by Isaza and Mapache. It was mixed by Jaycen Joshua and mastered by Dave Kutch in The Mastering Palace studio in New York City. About the composition Aitana told the press that "here are two types of songs in the discotheques; the ones that are sung and the ones that are danced, and "Más de lo que aposté" is one of those songs that you sing with a lot of force when it sounds and you are with your friends".

== Music video ==
The music video for the song, directed by Gus Carballo and produced by Music Content Factory, was filmed using green screen technology between Spain and Colombia in June. It premiered on YouTube the same day the collaboration was released, In 24 hours it received 1,6 million views and, 72 hours since the premiere, it had been visualized over 4,7 million times.

== Charts ==
Chart (2020)	Peak position
Spain (PROMUSICAE)	1

== Certifications ==
Region	Certification	Certified units/sales
Mexico (AMPROFON)	Platinum	60,000^{‡}
^{‡} Sales+streaming figures based on certification alone.

== Release history ==
Country	Date	Format	Label
Various	July 30, 2020	Digital download; streaming	Universal Music
Spain	August 9, 2020	Contemporary hit radio	Universal Music
