= Resilient (Katy Perry song) =

2020 promotional single by Katy Perry, Tiësto and Aitana

Promotional single by Katy Perry featuring Aitana

from the album Smile
- Released: November 17, 2020
- Studio: The Stellar House (Venice, CA)
- Genre: Pop
- Length: 3:07 (album version); 3:18 (remix version)
- Label: Capitol
- Songwriters: Katy Perry; Tor Erik Hermansen; Mikkel Storleer Eriksen; Ferras Alqaisi
- Producer: Stargate

Animated video
- "Resilient" (The Smile Video Series) on YouTube

Short film
- "Resilient" (Open to Better) on YouTube

"Resilient" is a song by American singer Katy Perry from her sixth studio album, Smile (2020). It is a pop song written by Perry and Ferras Alqaisi, as well as its producers Tor Erik Hermansen and Mikkel Storleer Eriksen, who produced under the Stargate name. The song was originally recorded at the Stellar House in Venice, California. A Tiësto remix of the song featuring Aitana was released as a promotional single on November 17, 2020.

Upon the release of Smile, the song received positive reviews from music critics. Commercially, the song's remix charted at number 56 on the PROMUSICAE charts in Spain and peaked at number 27 on the Ultratip Bubbling Under charts in Belgium. The song was also certified Gold by Pro-Música Brasil for equivalent sales of 20,000 units in Brazil. The accompanying music video for the song was released on August 31, 2020, as an installment in the Smile Video Series.

== Background and release ==
"Resilient" was first released as a part of Katy Perry's sixth studio album Smile on August 29, 2020. On August 31, an animated video for the song was released as a part of her Smile Video Series.

On November 17, a remix of the song by Dutch DJ Tiësto featuring Spanish singer Aitana was released as a part of a Coca-Cola campaign. Katy Perry commented on the collaboration that "[she] loved the unity perspective Aitana brought to the song, and how it evolves the message into the importance of being resilient as a group. It's not always just about personal growth, we need to grow together too!"

== Critical reception ==
Fernanda Brizuela from 34th Street describes how "Resilient" "is an example of the major themes in the record, as well as the process behind writing it", emphasizing how the song "assures the listener that even though there may be tough times in life, they make us the people we are today". Austria Masin from Dancing Astronaut described how the "unique and unexpected collaboration" of the Tiësto remix "harmonizes a variety of styles, with pop meeting progressive house to the tune of Aitana's lyrics, all of which offer a fresh perspective on the original".

== Music videos ==
An animated video for "Resilient" was released on August 31, 2020. Directed by Aya Tanimura, the animation was created by Kettu Studios and inspired by Japanese kokeshi dolls. The video depicts the growth of a tree on a bustling city street, from a tiny seed in a bird's droppings to a mature plant. Along the way, a diverse cast of characters interact with the tree, including a struggling musician resembling Perry, a local business owner, a duo of ants, a butterfly, and a striped cat. The video also features references to Perry's career. The animation studio won the Best Animation award at an award ceremony hosted by the Royal Television Society.

An Open to Better short film was released for "Resilient" Tiësto remix on November 17, 2020. The film features Katy smiling and dancing with a flower, along with clips of diverse groups of people and couples, along with their pets, overcoming life's obstacles through positive and enjoyable activities.

== Charts ==
Chart performance for "Resilient" (Tiësto remix)
Chart (2020)	Peak position
Belgium (Ultratip Bubbling Under Wallonia)	27
Spain (PROMUSICAE)	56

== Certifications ==
Certifications for "Resilient"
Region	Certification	Certified units/sales
Brazil (Pro-Música Brasil)	Gold	20,000^{‡}
^{‡} Sales+streaming figures based on certification alone.
