= Con la miel en los labios (song) =

2019 song by Aitana

"Con La Miel En Los Labios"

Single by Aitana

from the album Spoiler
- Language: Spanish
- English title: "With the desire"
- Released: May 31, 2019
- Recorded: 2019
- Genre: Latin ballad
- Length: 3:22
- Label: Universal Music
- Songwriter(s): Aitana Ocaña; Daniel Oriza Crespo; David Santisteban; Kai Etxaniz
- Producer(s): Santiago Deluchi

Aitana singles chronology
"Nada Sale Mal" (2019)	"Con La Miel En Los Labios" (2019)	"Me Quedo" (2019)

Music video
- "Con La Miel En Los Labios" on YouTube

"Con la miel en los labios" (transl. "with the desire", literally, "with the honey on the lips") is a song recorded by Spanish singer Aitana. Written by the singer as well as Daniel Oriza, David Santisteban and Kai Etxaniz, the song was released on May 31, 2019 as the second single of Aitana's debut studio album Spoiler (2019). The single was released through Universal Music.

== Background ==
The singer announced that she would release different extended plays through 2019 after her first-ever one got released in November 2018. Those plans changed drastically as the singer wanted to record a studio album despite having promised that she would do that kind of trilogy that some international artists do.

In March 2019, Spanish radio company Los40 announced that they would take Aitana on the road. Four intimate concerts were held in four different Spanish cities in April of that same year. In the first concert, held in Barcelona, the singer announced the name of her first-ever studio album as well as its release month, June. After it, she told the public that there was a very personal song for her on the album, Spoiler, called "Con la miel en los labios".

Aitana announced the release of the song through her social media on May 29, two days before its official release.

== Reception ==
=== Critical ===
Fans loved the song as they posted love messages to their idol's new song on social media. They praised the singer's ability to get people emotional with the fragility of her voice. "Con la miel en los labios" received mixed reviews by critics even though a big portion of them were positive.

=== Commercial ===
The song's music video, which was released on the same day, received more than a million views in 24 hours on YouTube. "Con la miel en los labios" was streamed more than 340,000 times on Spotify in that period of time making it the fifth-best debut in Spotify Spain's history as well as the second-best debut of the year in the platform within Spain. The song reached the peak position on iTunes Spain.

== Music video ==
The music video fior "Con la miel en los labios" was directed by Alex Maruny. This is the second time he collaborates with the singer. He had previously worked with her on the singer's "Vas a quedarte" music video. It features the singer singing the song next to Eudald Font, who is playing the piano. The music video doesn't have a plot at all as it consists only Aitana with a focus and a pianist. It was the second most popular music video in Spain in its release day, being surpassed by Rosalia's 2019 track "Aute Cuture".

== Charts ==
Chart (2019)	Peak position
Spain (PROMUSICAE)	6

== Certifications ==
Region	Certification	Certified units/sales
Mexico (AMPROFON)	Gold	30,000^{‡}
Spain (PROMUSICAE)	Platinum	40,000^{‡}
^{‡} Sales+streaming figures based on certification alone.

== Release history ==
Country	Date	Format	Label
Various	May 31, 2019	Digital download; streaming	Universal Music
