= Plaza de Toros de los Califas =

Stadium in Córdoba, Spain

Plaza de Toros de Los Califas
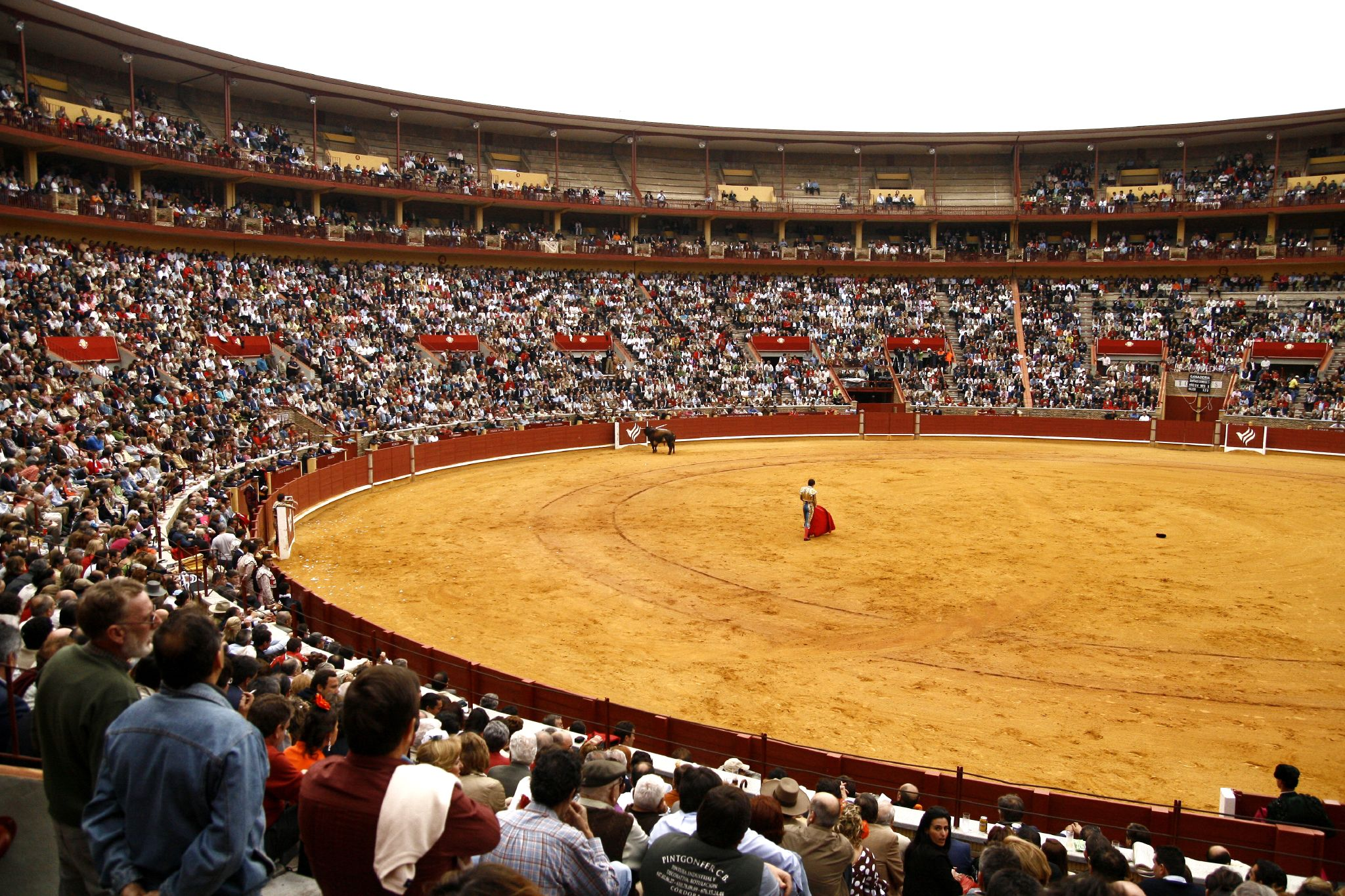
- Interactive map of Plaza de Toros de Los Califas
- Full name: Plaza de Toros de los Califas
- Location: Córdoba, Spain
- Coordinates: 37°52′55″N 4°47′41″W
- Capacity: 14,000

Construction
- Opened: 1965

Plaza de Toros de los Califas is a building in Córdoba, Spain. It is currently used for bull fighting. The stadium holds 14,000 people after the installation of red seats. It was built in 1965.
