= Spoiler (album) =

Studio album by Aitana
- Released: June 7, 2019
- Recorded: 2018–2019
- Genre: Pop
- Length: 43:31
- Language: Spanish · English
- Label: Universal Music
- Producer: Aitana Ocaña (exec.); Luis Salazar; David Santisteban; Andy Clay; Maye Osorio; Juan Pablo Isaza; Nabález; El Guincho; Alizzz; Santiago Deluchi; Sam Hanson; Mango; Pional; The Swaggermautz; Total Ape; Mauricio Rengifo; Andrés Torres

Aitana chronology
Tráiler (2018)	Spoiler (2019)	11 Razones (2020)

Singles from Spoiler
- 1. "Nada Sale Mal" Released: May 17, 2019; 2. "Con la Miel en los Labios" Released: May 31, 2019; 3. "Me Quedo" Released: June 28, 2019

Spoiler is the debut studio album by Spanish singer Aitana. The album was released through Universal Music Spain on June 7, 2019. It contains fifteen tracks, five on which are the ones included on her previous musical project, her debut extended play Tráiler (2018) except for the remix of her first ever single "Teléfono", which features Lele Pons. It includes a collaboration with Spanish singer Lola Indigo, who participated in the same television contest where Aitana's musical career started. The album was nominated for a Latin Grammy Award for Best Pop Vocal Album at the 2020 gala.

A reissue presenting five acoustic tracks and a tour documentary, Spoiler: Re-Play, was released in physical stores on December 20, 2019.

== Background ==
Aitana announced in October 2018 that she would be releasing a couple of extended plays through the year. She stated that: "the interval between the two EPs will be a little more than two or three months because I believe that today we devour more than we consume and, for this reason, I like the idea of doing everything little by little. At the end of November the first part will come out". In November 2018, the first part of this two-part studio album, Tráiler (2018), was released. It went straight to number one on the charts.

In March 2019, the singer announced that she would be embarking on an intimate promotional concert tour the month after. At the tour's first stop, in Barcelona, the singer revealed that she had changed her mind a little bit. Now, she wasn't scheduled to release another 6-track EP but a full album. She announced the album's name, Spoiler which completed the trilogy of Tráiler, Spoiler and its respective arena tour, Play. She also hinted the release date of the album; she said that it would be released by the beginning of summer.

The album's cover and release date was revealed through Aitana's respective social media profiles on May 22, 2019. The tracklist was revealed two days after.

== Promotion ==
=== Singles ===
"Nada Sale Mal" was announced as the album's first single on May 10, 2019 through the singer's social media. It was released seven days after the announcement. "Nada Sale Mal" received positive reviews for having a different sond than her previous singles. It is a pop song that includes a musical base generally used in trap. The single debuted in the fourth position on the PROMUSICAE chart; this made Aitana the first ever Spanish female act to have more than five songs consecutive released on the chart's top 10. "Nada Sale Mal" was certified gold in Spain after five weeks.

"Con la Miel en los Labios" was released on digital platforms on May 31, 2019 as the album's second official single. The song is a Latin ballad that includes a piano and the singer's voice without almost any voice adjustment. The song peaked at #6 on the PROMUSICAE musical chart. "Con la Miel en los Labios" received over 340,000 streams on Spotify in 24 hours.

In June 2019 it was announced that the album's third track "Me Quedo", which features Lola Indigo, would serve as its second official single. Both Aitana and Indigo were part of the ninth series of the Spanish singing television contest Operación Triunfo. Both of their musical careers began after they left the show. The song was produced by Alizzz and El Guincho, who are known for working with international artists like C. Tangana or Rosalía. The song's music video, directed by Canada, was released on June 28, 2019 following its radio debut. It received over 210,000 streams on Spotify in 24 hours. It peaked #6 in Spain. It was certified gold in July 2019.

=== Tour ===
Aitana embarked on the "Play Tour", her debut headlining concert tour on June 22, 2019. The first concert was held in Murcia and attracted over 4,500 people. It visited bullrings, parks, amphitheatres and arenas. On February 7, 2020, the singer announced an extension of it called "+ Play Tour" which will include new songs in the setlist and a revamped show aesthetic. It is set to begin in Valencia on May 23 and will conclude at the WiZink Center in Madrid on December 20, 2020.

== Commercial performance ==
Spoiler had the best streaming debut of 2019 on Spotify with 1,77 million streams in 24 hours. This made the album, the third most streamed in a single day in Spotify Spain history after "El Mal Querer" by Rosalía, released in November 2018 (2,66 million) and Aitana's Tráiler, released in the same month (2,12 million). Spoiler is also the third most-streamed album in a week in the platform's history, with more than 7 million streams. The album debuted in the top position on both the PROMUSICAE physical album chart as well as the streaming chart. It was certified gold in its first week. Spoiler peaked those charts for four consecutive weeks, until No.6 Collaborations Project by Ed Sheeran was released.

== Track listing ==
Credits adapted from the Tidal.

No.	Title	Writer(s)	Producer(s)	Length
1.	"Nada Sale Mal"	Aitana Ocaña; Andy Clay; Luis Salazar; Maye Osorio	Clay; Salazar	3:09
2.	"Teléfono"	Ocaña; Andrés Torres; Mauricio Rengifo	Torres; Refingo	2:43
3.	"Me Quedo" (featuring Lola Indigo)	Ocaña; Cristian Quirante Catalan; Felipe González Abad; Leticia Sala; Miriam Doblas Muñoz; Pablo Diaz Reixa	Alizzz; El Guincho	2:54
4.	"Vas a quedarte"	Ocaña; Juan Pablo Isaza; Juan Pablo Villamil	Isaza	3:46
5.	"Las Vegas"	Ocaña; Chris Zadley; Gonzalez Abad; Germán Gonzalo Duque; Molano; Deluchi	Mango; Nabález; Deluchi	3:20
6.	"Con la Miel en los Labios"	Ocaña; David Oriza Crespo; Santisteban; Kai Etxaniz	Deluchi	3:22
7.	"Perdimos la razón"	Ocaña; Zadley; Gozalez Abad; Gonzalo Duque; Molano	Mango; Nabález	2:57
8.	"Mejor que tú"	Eva Ruiz; Gonalez Abad; Gonzalo Duque; Molano; Pedro Malaver Turbay	Mango; Nabález	3:12
9.	"Stupid"	August Vinberg; Grace Tither; Jaramaye Daniels; Jeremy Dussolliett; Par Almqvist	Total Ape	2:55
10.	"Hold"	Ocaña; Kozze; Rob Russell; Sam Hanson	Hanson	2:21
11.	"Cristal"	Ocaña; Enrique Saiz González; Guillermo Galván; Miguel Barros	Pional	3:37
12.	"Popcorn"	Ocaña; Jovany Javier; Tat Tong	The Swaggernautz	2:38
13.	"El Trece"	Ocaña; Santisteban; Mandy Santos; Kiki Rivera	Deluchi	3:44
14.	"Barro Y Hielo"	Ocaña; Galván; Barros	Pional	2:53
Total length:				43:11

== Charts ==
=== Weekly charts ===
Weekly chart performance for Spoiler
Chart (2019)	Peak position
Spanish Albums (Promusicae)	1

=== Year-end charts ===
Year-end chart performance for Spoiler
Chart (2019)	Position
Spanish Albums (PROMUSICAE)	5
Chart (2020)	Position
Spanish Albums (PROMUSICAE)	16
Chart (2021)	Position
Spanish Albums (PROMUSICAE)	76

== Certifications ==
Region	Certification	Certified units/sales
Spain (Promusicae)	Platinum	40,000^{‡}
^{‡} Sales+streaming figures based on certification alone.

== Accolades ==
Year	Organization	Category	Result
2020	Premios Odeón	Best Album	Nominated
2020	Latin Grammy Awards	Best Pop Vocal Album	Nominated

== Release history ==
Region	Date	Format(s)	Label
Various	7 June 2019	CD; digital download	Universal Music
