= Aitana (singer) =

Spanish singer (born 1999)

- Aitana in 2023

Background information
- Born: Aitana Ocaña Morales; 27 June 1999 (age 27); Barcelona, Catalonia, Spain
- Genres: Pop; teen pop; pop rock; electropop; synth-pop; bubblegum pop
- Occupations: Singer; songwriter
- Years active: 2017–present
- Label: Universal Spain

Aitana Ocaña Morales (born 27 June 1999), known mononymously as Aitana, is a Spanish singer and songwriter. She first gained national recognition in 2017, placing as the runner-up in the revival series of the Spanish reality television talent show Operación Triunfo. While competing on the show, Aitana recorded the single "Lo Malo" with fellow contestant Ana Guerra. The song became an instant hit in Spain, debuting at number-one and holding the spot for several weeks. Following the competition, Aitana signed a 360º record deal with Universal Music Spain and released her debut solo single "Teléfono" to commercial success and streaming-breaking records.

Her debut studio album, Spoiler, was released in 2019 for which she received a Latin Grammy nomination for Best Pop Vocal Album and Best New Artist. In late 2020 she released her sophomore album 11 Razones, which spawned the top-five singles "+ (Más)" and "Corazón Sin Vida". After starring in the Disney+ original series La Última (2022) and in the film Love, Divided (2024), she released Alpha and Cuarto Azul to a wide number of top-five singles, including "Los Ángeles", "6 de Febrero" and "Superestrella". The former album received a nomination for Best Contemporary Pop Album and scored Best Recording Package at the 26th Latin Grammy Awards.

Dubbed as the "Spanish Princess of Pop", Aitana has accumulated five number one songs in her home country throughout her career: "Lo Malo", "Teléfono", "Vas a Quedarte", "Gran Vía", and "Mon Amour". She has also been honored with a Latin Grammy Award, a Premio Ondas, two Premios de la Academia de Música, nine Premios Odeon, a Radio Disney Music Award, an MTV Europe Music Award, and a Kids' Choice Award, among many others. She has been an assessor on season six of La Voz Kids in 2021, and a coach on seasons seven and eight in 2022 and 2023.

== Early life ==
Aitana Ocaña Morales was born in Barcelona on 27 June 1999; as the only child of Cosme Ocaña and Belén Morales. She grew up in the municipality of Viladecans before moving to Sant Climent de Llobregat at age nine. In 2014, Aitana began to share cover versions of popular songs on YouTube. That year, she released her first original songs.

In 2017, she completed bachillerato and was admitted to study design at university the following year. After taking selectividad, she visited Ciudad Universitaria in Madrid, where the auditions for Operación Triunfo were being held. After auditioning, she was selected for series nine of the competition.

== Career ==
=== 2017–2018: Operación Triunfo and first releases ===
In October 2017, Aitana entered musical reality show contest Operación Triunfo. After over three months it ended with her as the show's runner-up. During her participation in the contest, she competed to represent Spain in the Eurovision Song Contest 2018 with two songs: "Arde", which she performed solo, and "Lo malo", composed by Brisa Fenoy and performed as a duet with Ana Guerra. The former song ended in second place and the latter finished third in the selection. Even though "Lo malo" hadn't been selected by the public to represent the country, it became an instant hit in Spain, topping the charts for five non-consecutive weeks and being certified 5× platinum. A remix of the song featuring Greeicy and Tini was released in August 2018. The song was performed at the 2019 Premios Lo Nuestro in Miami.

Aitana embarked on a co-headlining tour with her Operación Triunfo mates from March to December 2018. The tour consisted of 23 dates and was attended by almost 300,000 people. In July, the singer released her first solo single "Teléfono" which received mixed reviews. The song became her first number-one solo song in Spain. It topped the charts for six consecutive weeks and was certified four times platinum. Its music video became the most watched video on its first twenty-four hours on YouTube's Vevo channel in Spain. "Teléfono" was included in her debut extended play, Tráiler, which she released on November 30, 2018. The EP features six original songs, of which one is a collaboration with the Venezuelan-American singer Lele Pons. A week after, "Vas a Quedarte" was released as the EP's second single. Written alongside Colombian band Morat, it became her third number-one hit in Spain and was nominated for Best Spanish Song at the 2019 Los 40 Music Awards. She also released an illustrated book, became an ambassador for Stradivarius, took part of a Coca-Cola Christmas campaign, did a cameo in Skam España and presented Bad Bunny alongside Pons at the 19th Annual Latin Grammy Awards.

=== 2019–2020: Spoiler and 11 Razones ===
Aitana began teasing her debut studio album in March 2019 which was intended to be a new EP that would be the second of a trilogy. That same month, the singer announced that she would be embarking on an intimate promotional concert tour the month after produced by Los 40. At the tour's first stop, in Barcelona, the singer revealed that she had changed her mind a little bit. Now, she wasn't scheduled to release another 6-track EP but a full album. She announced the album's name, Spoiler and hinted the release date of the album; she said that it would be released by the beginning of summer. In April she collaborated with Morat on "Presiento" and in May with former One Direction member Zayn in the revamped version of "A Whole New World" for the live action film of Disney's Aladdin. On 17 May 2019, she released "Nada Sale Mal", the lead single of her upcoming debut studio album. It peaked at four on the Spanish charts and was certified Gold. The album was released digitally and physically on 7 June 2019. It debuted at the top of the charts, was certified Gold in its first week and scored a Latin Grammy nomination for Best Pop Vocal Album at the 2020 gala. Later that month, her collaboration with Lola Indigo "Me Quedo" was released as the album's second single. Thanks to this work, Aitana was nominated for Best New Artist at the 20th Annual Latin Grammy Awards, where she also performed "Mi Persona Favorita" alongside Greeicy, Nella and Alejandro Sanz.

A reissued version of Spoiler was released on 20 December 2019, featuring five acoustic versions of her own songs and a tour documentary that features images of her concerts in Madrid, Barcelona and Granada. It hasn't been released in digital platforms but only in physical stores. Aitana ended 2019 being the third most streamed female artist on Spotify in Spain, behind Rosalía and Karol G.

The singer embarked on her first concert tour, the Play Tour in support of the album from June to December 2019, comprising 27 shows. A tour extension, alternatively titled "+ Play Tour", was planned for 2020 but was canceled due to the COVID-19 pandemic. The show was taped for the video album Play Tour: En Directo and for the Movistar+ television special Play Tour: Tras las Luces, both released in 2020.

On 18 December 2019, Aitana released "+ (Más)", featuring Cali y El Dandee, the lead single of her upcoming second studio album. "+" achieved great commercial success in Spain, spending nine weeks at the country's top ten chart, and hinted a musical shift of Aitana to pop rock. In April 2020 she collaborated with Spanish singer David Bisbal on the duet version of his track "Si Tú la Quieres", which became a twenty hit in Spain. It would later win the Los 40 Music Award for Best Spanish Song. In May, Aitana announced that she would be collaborating with other musical acts throughout the year prior to the release of her sophomore record. Summertime saw the release of three new singles: "Enemigos", alongside Reik, "Más De Lo Que Aposté", alongside Morat, and "Tu Foto del DNI" alongside childhood friend Marmi., which was described as "a pleasant change in the singer's sound as well as one of the best vocal collaborations released by someone known for being in OT". The second single of her upcoming album, "Corazón Sin Vida" was released on 2 October, featuring vocals by Colombian singer Sebastián Yatra. It debuted at number four in Spain. On 30 October, she was featured in "Friend de Semana", a song by Danna Paola and Luisa Sonza. On November 13, she was contributed vocals to Tiësto's remix of Katy Perry's "Resilient". She described working with Perry as "a dream come true". Her work during the year was awarded a Premio Ondas for Musical Phenomenon of the Year for "being one of the most relevant national pop artists in recent years" and "an artist with a promising future and a bulwark of pop music in Spanish".

In November, Aitana announced that her sophomore studio album would be named 11 Razones, which would eventually be released on 11 December. The album is reminiscent of early 2000s pop rock, which saw a departure from the sounds she had explored on Spoiler. It debuted at number two on the PROMUSICAE chart and later peaked at the top position. Promotion for the record continued by the release of a third single, a standard black vinyl pressing and a Record Store Day limited edition of the record. A supporting concert tour and began in July in Barcelona. and ended in December at the WiZink Center in Madrid after 31 shows. The tour would also visit Latin America in 2022.

=== 2021–2024: Acting venture and Alpha ===
A period of single releases started in April 2021 with the debut of the promotional single "Ni Una Más", dubbed as a "feminist anthem". It peaked at 37 on the Spanish charts. During the summer, Aitana collaborated with Fresquito and Mango on the remix of their track "Mándame Un Audio" and with novel artist Zzoilo on the remix of his debut single "Mon Amour". The latter one peaked at number one in Spain and held the position for six weeks, becoming Aitana's best chart performing single since 2018's "Vas a Quedarte". In the meantime, a duet with Evaluna Montaner, "Aunque No Sea Conmigo" was released as a single in late July, peaking at 55. In September, the singer released the solo track "Berlín". A fan favourite, it met a great performance on TikTok, peaking at fifteen in Spain. "Formentera", a duet with Nicki Nicole, "En El Coche", and "Otra Vez" were released during 2022 as singles off her newest album. Aitana was also part of the forthcoming records of Amaia, Cali y El Dandee, Melendi, Sangiovanni, Sebastián Yatra and Pablo Alborán.

Later that year, she starred as aspiring singer Candela in the Disney+ musical romantic drama La Última alongside Miguel Bernardeau. The five-episode television series follows Candela's relationship with aspiring boxer Diego (played by Bernardeau), which becomes strained after her career begins to overshadow his. Aitana co-wrote and produced most of the songs on the soundtrack for La Última. Its lead single, the title track "La Última", was released on 11 November 2022. The soundtrack contains 16 tracks, including eight original songs and another eight acoustic versions and received generally positive reviews. Aitana will also star alongside Fernando Guallar in the upcoming domestic film 2023 adaptation of Un peu, beaucoup, aveuglément, directed by Patricia Font.

On 3 March 2023, Aitana revealed the trailer for her upcoming studio album Alpha, alongside a tentative 2023 release date. Its lead single "Los Ángeles" was released on 31 March. On June 7, she released the second single from her third studio album, "Las Babys". "miamor", the third single from the album was released on August 25 featuring rapper Rels B. On August 28, it was announced that her album Alpha would be released on September 22 with the cover artwork being shown the day after and a fan presale starting on August 30 for some countries and on August 31 in Spain. On September 8, its tracklist was announced featuring 15 tracks. On October 1, she started the Alpha Tour across Spain, Portugal and Latin America.

In 2024, Aitana mentioned that she would begin preparing her fourth studio album. To do this, she traveled back to Los Angeles and Miami to meet with various producers. While working on new songs, she was the special guest of Sangiovanni at the Sanremo Music Festival (Italy), where she performed a version of "Farfalle". In January 2024, she visited the contestants of Operación Triunfo 2023, returning to the academy where her career began six years earlier. In April, she collaborated for the third time with Colombian artist Sebastián Yatra on the ballad "Akureyri", with the music video filmed in the Icelandic city of the same name. A month later, she featured on Sen Senra's album PO2054AZ with the song "Hermosa Casualidad".

The singer-songwriter announced her first solo concert in a stadium, the Santiago Bernabéu, with a capacity of over 60,000 people, scheduled for December 2024. The tickets sold out in record time. A few months later, she announced a second concert at the same stadium, scheduled for the day after the original concert. However, due to soundproofing issues at the stadium, the concerts were postponed to June 2025.

In early July, she released the solo song "4TO 23", bringing back pop with new sounds like synthpop. A month later, she collaborated with British singer Sam Smith on a version of his song “"Like I Can" (2014), in both Spanish and English. In October, she received the Music award at the Bazaar Women of the Year 2024, presented by Harper's Bazaar to the most influential women in various fields. She also collaborated on Quevedo's album Buenas Noches with the track "Gran Vía", which debuted at number one on the most-streamed songs list on Spotify, YouTube, and Apple Music.

=== 2025–present: Metamorfosis and Cuarto azul ===
In January 2025, she initiated a new musical era for the forthcoming release of her fourth studio album, Cuarto azul. The first song from the album, "Segundo Intento", was released, featuring a sweet melody, dance elements, and a pop foundation. On February 28, her documentary Aitana: Metamorfosis premiered on Netflix, where the singer reveals intimate moments and reflects on her life since leaving Operación Triunfo. In March 2025, she released a second preview of her fourth album, a single with Puerto Rican artist Myke Towers, "Sentimiento Natural". The same month, she announced her limited stadium tour, Metamorfosis Season. Cuarto azul received a nomination for the Best Contemporary Pop Album and a win for Best Recording Package at the 26th Annual Latin Grammy Awards, marking Aitana's first career win at the ceremony.

== Other ventures ==
=== Product and endorsements ===
In 2018, Aitana became the youngest ambassador of multinational clothing company Inditex by releasing a limited edition T-shirt titled Pa' Mala Yo with Stradivarius as part of the promotion of her debut single "Lo Malo". Both campaigns had a great commercial impact of 2 million euros. Later that year she signed a partnership with Rimmel London and with Good Hair Day. She also partnered with Coca-Cola for their 2018 Christmas jingle.

During 2020, Aitana was announced as the new face of the summer campaign of optical company Multiópticas and released a new pair of limited sunglasses. She also became an ambassador for French fashion house Yves Saint Laurent. She parallelly collaborated with Coca-Cola again for their European #OpenToBetter campaign, which also featured Katy Perry. As part of the campaign, Aitana and Perry recorded a remixed version of the latter's track "Resilient".

In 2021, the singer released a clothing collection with German manufacturer Puma, which was conceived as the Wild Rose Collection. In September, Aitana collaborated with McDonald's to launch a limited edition meal, popularly called "McAitana", that was introduced in participating restaurants in Spain. The partnership marked the first celebrity-endorsed McDonald's meal in Europe. It sparked controversy due to Aitana suffering from coeliac disease and, therefore, being unable to try her own meal.

Aitana became the face of Pantene in Spain in 2023. The following year, Aitana became a global ambassador of airline Iberia. She also launched a partnership with multinational bank Santander, and launched a customized card. A Nancy doll based on Aitana was released in October 2024.

==== Fragrances ====
Aitana has released a total of three perfumes with Douglas. The first of three perfumes was released in December 2018, and was self-titled. A second perfume of Aitana, titled Be Magnetic was released in September 2020. It featured the smell of gooseberry, tuber and musk. 2021 saw the release of a third Douglas fragrance, this time called Aitana 1999, set for a November release.

== Personal life ==
During her childhood Aitana lived in Viladecans and Sant Climent de Llobregat. Following her contract with Universal Music Spain, in October 2018, Aitana left Sant Climent de Llobregat and moved alone to an apartment in the Fuente del Berro district in Madrid owned by the Spanish actress Blanca Suárez. In 2025, she confirmed she owned four properties, two of them she rented. Aitana lives between Madrid and Miami.

Ever since her rise to fame, Aitana's love life has been a subject of high media coverage and speculation. In 2018, she ended her relationship with childhood boyfriend Vicente Rodríguez and began a romantic relation with her Operación Triunfo companion Luis Cepeda, which caused a lot of controversy due to the 10-year age disparity between them. They broke up in September 2018. In late 2018, Aitana started a relationship with actor Miguel Bernardeau. In December 2022, less than two weeks after the release of Our Only Chance, a limited series for Disney+ in which they were co-stars, it was reported that Aitana and Bernardeau had broken up. In August 2023 it was confirmed she had started a relationship with Colombian singer Sebastián Yatra, which ended in 2024 after going on-again and off-again.

In May 2025, it was revealed she is dating YouTuber YoSoyPlex.

== Public image ==
Aitana has been set as an example on various occasions for her excellent dealings with the media. The written press has highlighted the sweetness and authenticity that she exudes in her interviews, highlighting "the professionalism of the singer, who has been in the public sphere for just two years, and has never had a bad face towards the press despite the harassment she has suffered ever since she left Operación Triunfo”. Borja Terán, from 20 Minutos, wrote, in September 2021, an article on the attitude of the singer towards the public and journalists, both in televised and written interviews, where he highlighted her "authenticity" and compared her with folkloric singers of yesteryear for "sharing her experiences with that generosity that seduces, because she gives details without caring to share them with the viewer, so the public feels involved in her life, because she narrates it without apparent snobbery, without any kind of complex or moral superiority".

About her early image in the music industry, Aitana stated to Forbes that "I have had a hard time getting credibility from people in the industry. They saw me as a girl who just left OT and to see how I was going to manage her career. But more and more artists have trusted me, I have been collaborating with them —from Katy Perry to Sebastián Yatra— and my first tour, Play Tour, helped add to my credibility as an artist."

== Discography ==
- Spoiler (2019)
- 11 Razones (2020)
- Alpha (2023)
- Cuarto Azul (2025)

== Filmography ==
=== Film ===
Year	Film	Role	Notes	Ref.
2020	Play Tour: en directo	Herself	Concert film	
2024	Mis ganas ganan, la historia de Elena Huelva	Herself	Guest	
2024	Love, Divided	Valentina	Lead role	

=== Television ===
Year	Show	Notes	Ref.
2017–2018	Operación Triunfo	Contestant	
2018	Skam España	Guest appearance	
2018–2024	El Hormiguero	Guest, (9 programs)	
2020	Masterchef Junior	Guest	
2020	Pongamos Que Hablo de Mecano	Performer	
2020	La Marató	Performer	
2021	35th Goya Awards	Performer	
2021–2023	La Resistencia	Guest, (5 programs)	
2021–2023	La Voz Kids	Adviser (season 6)	
2021–2023	La Voz Kids	Coach (season 7-8)	
2022	La Última (Our Only Chance)	Lead role	
2025	La Revuelta	Guest	
2025	Aitana: Metamorfosis	Docuseries	

=== Commercials ===
Year	Product(s)	Brand(s)	Role	Ref.
2018	Rimmel		Herself	
2018	Christmas campaign	Coca-Cola	Herself	
2020	Yves Saint Laurent		Herself	
2020	Open To Better	Coca-Cola	Herself	
2021	Tous		Herself	
2021	McAitana	McDonald's	Herself	
2023	Pixel 8	Google	Herself	
2023	Smart Brabus	Smart	Herself	

== Tours ==
=== Headlining ===
- Play Tour (2019)
- 11 Razones Tour (2021–2022)
- Alpha Tour (2023–2024)
- Cuarto Azul World Tour (2026–2027)

=== Promotional ===
- Metamorfosis Season (2025)

=== Co-headlining ===
- Operacion Triunfo 2017 En Concierto (2018)

== Awards and nominations ==
Award	Year	Category	Work	Result
BreakTudo Awards	2019	International revelation artist	Herself	Nominated
BreakTudo Awards	2021	Song of the Year	"Aunque no sea conmigo"	Nominated
BreakTudo Awards	2023	Song of the Year	"Los Ángeles"	Nominated
Cosmo Awards	2018	Girl Gang Award	Herself	Won
Elle Style Awards	2021	Musical Revolution	Herself	Won
Heat Latin Music Awards	2021	Best Pop Artist	Herself	Nominated
Heat Latin Music Awards	2022	Best Collaboration	"Mon Amour (Remix)"	Nominated
Heat Latin Music Awards	2024	Best Pop Artist	Herself	Nominated
Heat Latin Music Awards	2026	Best Pop Artist	Herself	Nominated
Heat Latin Music Awards	2026	Best Female Artist	Herself	Nominated
Heat Latin Music Awards	2026	Best Music Video	"Superestrella"	Nominated
Heat Latin Music Awards	2026	Song of the Year	"Superestrella"	Nominated
Heat Latin Music Awards	2026	Best Viral Song	"Superestrella"	Nominated
Kids' Choice Awards	2019	Favorite Spanish Act	Herself	Won
Latin Grammy Awards	2019	Best New Artist	Herself	Nominated
Latin Grammy Awards	2020	Best Contemporary Pop Album	Spoiler	Nominated
Latin Grammy Awards	2022	Album of the Year (Note: For her work as the featured artist and songwriter on "Las Dudas".)	Dharma	Nominated
Latin Grammy Awards	2025	Best Contemporary Pop Album	Cuarto azul	Nominated
Latin Grammy Awards	2025	Best Recording Package	Cuarto azul	Won
Latin Music Italian Awards	2021	Best Eurolatino Female Artist	Herself	Nominated
Lo Nuestro Awards	2024	Female Pop Artist of the Year	Herself	Nominated
Lo Nuestro Awards	2025	Pop-Urban Best "EuroSong"	"4to 23"	Nominated
Lo Nuestro Awards	2026	Pop-Urban Best "EuroSong"	"6 de febrero"	Won
Lo Nuestro Awards	2026	Pop/Urban - Song of the Year	"6 de febrero"	Nominated
Lo Nuestro Awards	2026	Pop - Album of the Year	Cuarto azul	Nominated
Lo Nuestro Awards	2026	Pop - Female Artist of the Year	Herself	Nominated
Los 40 Music Awards	2018	Best New Artist	Herself	Won
Los 40 Music Awards	2018	Best Spanish Song	"Lo Malo"	Nominated
Los 40 Music Awards	2019	Best Spanish Act	Herself	Nominated
Los 40 Music Awards	2019	Del 40 al 1 Artist Award	Herself	Won
Los 40 Music Awards	2019	Best Spanish Song	"Vas a Quedarte"	Nominated
Los 40 Music Awards	2019	Best Spanish Video	"Me Quedo"	Nominated
Los 40 Music Awards	2020	Best Spanish Act	Herself	Won
Los 40 Music Awards	2020	Best Spanish Song	"+" (with Cali y El Dandee)	Nominated
Los 40 Music Awards	2020	Best Spanish Song	"Si Tú La Quieres" (with David Bisbal)	Won
Los 40 Music Awards	2020	Best Spanish Video	"Enemigos" (with Reik)	Nominated
Los 40 Music Awards	2021	Best Spanish Album	11 Razones	Nominated
Los 40 Music Awards	2021	Best Live	Herself	Won
Los 40 Music Awards	2022	Best Spanish Act	Herself	Nominated
Los 40 Music Awards	2022	Best Spanish Collaboration	"Formentera" (with Nicki Nicole)	Won
Los 40 Music Awards	2022	Best Spanish Song	"Formentera" (with Nicki Nicole)	Nominated
Los 40 Music Awards	2023	Best Spanish Act	Herself	Nominated
Los 40 Music Awards	2023	Best Spanish Album	Alpha	Won
Los 40 Music Awards	2023	Best Spanish Song	"Los Ángeles"	Nominated
Los 40 Music Awards	2023	Best Spanish Video	"Las Babys"	Won
Los 40 Music Awards	2023	Best Spanish Collaboration	"miamor" (with Rels B)	Nominated
Los 40 Music Awards	2023	Best Spanish Tour, Festival or Concert	Alpha Tour	Nominated
Los 40 Music Awards	2024	Best Spanish Tour, Festival or Concert	Alpha Tour	Nominated
Los 40 Music Awards	2024	Best Spanish Act	Herself	Nominated
Los 40 Music Awards	2024	Best Spanish Video	"Hermosa Casualidad" (with San Senra)	Nominated
Los 40 Music Awards	2024	Best Spanish Collaboration	"Akureyri" (with Sebastian Yatra)	Nominated
Los 40 Music Awards	2025	Best Spanish Collaboration	"Gran Vía" (with Quevedo)	Nominated
Los 40 Music Awards	2025	Best Spanish Collaboration	"Sentimiento Natural" (with Myke Towers)	Nominated
Los 40 Music Awards	2025	Best Spanish Act	Herself	Won
Los 40 Music Awards	2025	Best Spanish Album	Cuarto azul	Nominated
Los 40 Music Awards	2025	Best Spanish Tour or Concert	Metamorfosis Season	Won
Los 40 Music Awards	2026	Best Spanish Tour or Concert	Cuarto Azul World Tour	Won
Los 40 Music Awards	2026	Best Spanish Song	"Superestrella"	Won
Los 40 Music Awards	2026	Best Live	Herself	Nominated
MTV Europe Music Awards	2020	Best Spanish Act	Herself	Nominated
MTV Europe Music Awards	2021	Best Spanish Act	Herself	Won
Premios de la Academia de Música	2024	Artist of the Year	Herself	Nominated
Premios de la Academia de Música	2024	Best Pop Album	Alpha	Nominated
Premios de la Academia de Música	2024	Best Electronic Music Album	Alpha	Nominated
Premios de la Academia de Música	2024	Best Urban Song	"miamor" (with Rels B)	Won
Premios de la Academia de Música	2024	Best Electronic Music Song	"Los Ángeles"	Won
Premios de la Academia de Música	2026	Best Pop Album	Cuarto azul	Nominated
Premios de la Academia de Música	2026	Best Pop Song	"Superestrella"	Nominated
Premios de la Academia de Música	2026	Artist of the Year	Herself	Nominated
Premios Dial	2020	Best Artist	Herself	Won
Premios Juventud	2022	Best Social Dance Challenge	"Mon Amour (Remix)"	Nominated
Premios Juventud	2023	Female Artist - On the Rise	Herself	Nominated
Premios Juventud	2024	Favorite Dance Track	"Las Babys"	Nominated
Premios Juventud	2025	Girl Power	"¿Para Qué Volver?" (with Ela Taubert)	Nominated
Premios Juventud	2026	Best Euro-Song	"Superestrella"	Won
Premios Juventud	2026	Best Pop Album	Cuarto azul	Won
Premios Juventud	2026	Premios Juventud Female Artist	Herself	Nominated
Premios Odeón	2020	Best Female Artist	Herself	Nominated
Premios Odeón	2020	Best New Artist	Herself	Won
Premios Odeón	2020	Best Album	Spoiler	Nominated
Premios Odeón	2020	Best Song	"Presiento"	Nominated
Premios Odeón	2020	Best Music Video	"Teléfono"	Nominated
Premios Odeón	2021	Best Pop Song	"+" (with Cali y El Dandee)	Won
Premios Odeón	2021	Best Pop Song	"Si Tú La Quieres" (with David Bisbal)	Nominated
Premios Odeón	2021	Best Music Video	"+" (with Cali y El Dandee)	Nominated
Premios Odeón	2021	Best Music Video	"Si Tú La Quieres" (with David Bisbal)	Nominated
Premios Odeón	2021	Best Pop Artist	Herself	Nominated
Premios Odeón	2022	Best Pop Artist	Herself	Won
Premios Odeón	2022	Song of the Year	"Mon Amour (Remix)"	Nominated
Premios Odeón	2022	Best Pop Song	"Mon Amour (Remix)"	Won
Premios Odeón	2023	Best Internacional Song	"Farfalle"	Won
Premios Odeón	2024	Best Pop Album	Alpha	Won
Premios Odeón	2025	Best Alternative Song	"Hermosa Casualidad"	Won
Premios Odeón	2026	Best Pop Album	Cuarto azul	Won
Premios Odeón	2026	Best Pop Song	"Superestrella"	Won
Premios Ondas	2021	Musical Phenomenon of the Year	Herself	Won
Radio Disney Music Awards	2018	Best Spanish Act	Herself	Won
