= Enemigos (song) =

2020 song by Aitana and Reik

Single by Aitana and Reik
- Language: Spanish
- English title: "Enemies"
- Released: May 15, 2020
- Recorded: April 2019
- Genre: Pop
- Length: 3:17
- Label: Universal · Sony
- Songwriters: Aitana Ocaña; Chris Zadley; Santiago Deluchi; Felipe González Abad; Germán Gonzalo Duque Molano
- Producers: Mango; Nabález; Santiago Deluchi

Aitana singles chronology
| "Si Tú la Quieres" (2020) | "Enemigos" (2020) | "Más De Lo Que Aposté" (2020) |

Reik singles chronology
| "Si Me Dices Que Sí" (2020) | "Enemigos" (2020) | "Bésame (I Need You)" (2020) |

Music video
- "Enemigos" on YouTube

"Enemigos" (transl. "Enemies") is a song recorded by Spanish singer Aitana in collaboration with Mexican musical trio Reik. The song, written by Mango, Nabález, Santiago Deluchi, Chris Zadley and the singer herself, was released as the second single of Aitana's second studio album on May 15, 2020 through Universal and Sony Music. Both the cover art and the music video were designed by Catalan illustrator Laia López.

== Background ==
In an interview with Los40 a year later, Mexican musical trio Reik told the radio station that they had a project in common with the Spanish singer. Four days later Aitana told to the same radio station that the collaboration was going to be released soon as well as another one with Colombian band Piso 21 that will be released throughout the year. On May 10, Aitana announced that she would go live on Instagram with someone the following day in the evening to reveal something special. See so, she contacted with Reik and shared the live-stream in order to announce their newest musical collaboration. Aitana told the audience that the song was recorded in April 2019 and meant to be included in the singer's debut album Spoiler but was somehow discarted in major part because she felt like there was something missing in the track. In order to fill the void, she contacted with Reik and got fascinated on how their voices adjoined.

== Composition ==
The song was written by Mango, Nabález, Santiago Deluchi, Chris Zadley and the singer herself and produced by the three first. It was mixed by Brian Springer and mastered by Dave Kutch in The Mastering Palace studio in New York City. Lyrically and visually the song shows a "story of a relationship between people like anyone, contextualized in anime and a concept of superheroes, which complete the metaphor and meaning of the message. A video clip located in a current era, but with certain elements that differentiate it from our reality".

== Commercial performance ==
"Enemigos" had the best debut on Spotify Spain of 2020 after being streamed over 280,000 times in Spain and 208,000 times internationally. The song debuted on the fifth position in Spotify Spain and in the twenty second position in Apple Music. "Enemigos" topped the ITunes musical chart in Spain, and hit the top ten in Chile, Mexico and Colombia. In 72 hours, the song was streamed over 7 million times.

== Music video ==
The music video for "Enemigos" was scheduled to be filmed in March 2020 in Spain but was cancelled due to the national quarantine caused by the 2020 COVID-19 pandemic. Thus, their respective teams contacted with graphic design studios Alquimia Estudios and company producer Antiestéticos who put Barcelonian illustrator Laia López (who had already released multiple comic books) to make an animated music video instead of a live-action one since the World Health Organization, the Government of Spain and of multiple other regions recommended not to meet anybody that does not live with you at home to prevent the expansion of the coronavirus disease. The music video was released alongside the song on May 15 and was the best selling music video on ITunes Spain. It accumuled over 1,5 million views in its premiere day and entered the trending videos in 15 countries like Ecuador, Uruguay, Peru, Cambodia and the Dominican Republic.

== Charts ==
| Chart (2020) | Peak position |
|---|---|
| Paraguay Pop (Monitor Latino) | 9 |
| Spain (PROMUSICAE) | 11 |

== Certifications ==
| Region | Certification | Certified units/sales |
|---|---|---|
| Spain (PROMUSICAE) | Gold | 20,000^{‡} |
^{‡} Sales+streaming figures based on certification alone.

== Release history ==
| Country | Date | Format | Label |
|---|---|---|---|
| Various | May 15, 2020 | Digital download; streaming | Universal · Sony |
| Spain | May 17, 2020 | Contemporary hit radio | Universal Music |
