= Nada sale mal =

2019 song by Aitana

"Nada Sale Mal"

Single by Aitana

from the album Spoiler
- Language: Spanish
- English title: "Nothing goes wrong"
- Released: May 17, 2019
- Genre: Pop trap
- Length: 3:09
- Label: Universal Music Spain
- Songwriter(s): Aitana Ocaña; Andy Clay; Luis Salazar; Maye Osorio
- Producer(s): Salazar

Aitana singles chronology
"Presiento" (2019)	"Nada Sale Mal" (2019)	"Con La Miel En Los Labios" (2019)

"Nada sale mal" (transl. "Nothing Goes Wrong") is a song recorded by Spanish pop singer Aitana. Written by Andy Clay, Luis Salazar, Maye Osorio and the singer herself, the song was released on May 17, 2019, through Universal Music. It became the first single of her debut studio album Spoiler.

== Background ==
On October 25, 2018, the singer appeared on the late night talk show El Hormiguero, where she announced the release of her debut EP Tráiler, which was released the following month. It became her first release to reach the top of the Spanish albums chart. She promised that it would not take much time to release the EP's second chapter. She first hinted that it could be released in the first quarter of 2019.

Later in April 2019, Aitana announced the title of her debut album at an intimate concert held in Barcelona. She also announced that its first single would be released soon. On May 10, 2019, the singer unveiled the single's name, cover and release date through her respective social media profiles. "Nada sale mal" was finally released on May 17. It talks about a girl trying to find a partner. She does only want a short relationship which is a risk for her. The song is mainly pop. It incorporates a Spanish guitar which gives the song a tango-flamenco vibe.

== Commercial performance ==
The music video received more than a million views within a day. After a week, the song had reached five and a half more million views on YouTube. The song had been streamed more than two million times on Spotify in that short amount of time. It became the number one song on the platform in Spain. The single was sent to the Spanish and Latin American radio station Los 40 on May 26.

== Music video ==
The single's official music video was released alongside the song. It was first previewed on May 13, 2019. It shows Aitana in an hotel hall about to reach the elevator. She then meets a young model at the elevator who she promises that he is going to be hers but that she does not know for how long. After that scene, more people appear in the elevator but she does not stay with them there, In the end, she stays with the model that first appeared in the video whose role was played by Spanish professional model Fernando Lindez. The music video reached a million views in less than 24 hours and was the most popular video on YouTube Spain for five days.

== Live performances ==
The song was performed live on its release day in Madrid as Aitana was part of the Primavera Pop music festival lineup, which is held in Spain's capital city, Rubí and Málaga over three consecutive days. She performed the song the following day in Rubí (Barcelona), then in Málaga the day after.

== Charts ==
Chart (2019)	Peak position
Spain (PROMUSICAE)	4

== Certifications ==
Region	Certification	Certified units/sales
Spain (PROMUSICAE)	Gold	20,000^{‡}
^{‡} Sales+streaming figures based on certification alone.

== Release history ==
Country	Date	Format	Label
Various	May 17, 2019	Digital download; streaming	Universal Music
Spain	May 26, 2019	Contemporary hit radio	Universal Music
