= Tráiler =

EP by Aitana
- Released: 30 November 2018
- Recorded: 2018
- Genre: Pop; teen pop
- Length: 17:56
- Language: Spanish; English
- Label: Universal Music
- Producer: Mauricio Rengifo; Andrés Torres; Total Ape; Nabález; Mango; The Swaggernautz; Juan Pablo Isaza

Aitana chronology
Sus canciones (2018)	Tráiler (2018)	Spoiler (2019)

Singles from Tráiler
- 1. "Teléfono" Released: 27 July 2018; 2. "Vas a quedarte" Released: 9 December 2018

Tráiler is the debut extended play by Spanish singer Aitana. It will be released through Universal Music's Spain subdivision on 30 November 2018. Tráiler was produced by Aitana, being the first musical project where the singer was involved in that area. The EP was co-produced by Mauricio Rengifo and Andrés Torres, who in 2017 produced the song "Despacito" among other producers. It features six original songs, of which one is a collaboration with the Venezuelan-American singer Lele Pons.

== Background ==
In February 2018, the singer (then known under her original name, Aitana Ocaña), was proclaimed the second finalist of the Spanish talent show Operación Triunfo, in its ninth edition. After that achievement, the Barcelona-native singer began working on what would be her first album. In March 2018 she signed a record deal with Universal Music. On 16 March of that same year, her first compilation album was released. It includes the themes she defended during her time in the TV show. In April 2018 it was reported that Aitana had traveled to Los Angeles to give shape to her first musical project. After the promotion given to her first single, "Lo malo", ended, she moved away from social networks and the public eye to give the final touches to what would later be Tráiler. On 17 July, the singer announced the name and release date of the first single from the EP, "Teléfono". The single was released to the music market ten days later.

On 25 October, the singer visited the Spanish talk show El Hormiguero 3.0. where she unveiled the name of her first project. It would be called Tráiler and, according to her, "it's like a two-piece album. The time interval between the two EPs will be little more than two-three months because I think that today we devour more than we consume and, for that reason, I like the idea of doing everything little by little. The first part will be released at the end of November. It has a strange name, after a lot of thought, I decided that it was called Tráiler because it is like an appetizer of only six songs of everything that is to come later."

A few weeks later, on 13 November, the singer unveiled via her social media the cover of the EP, which was photographed by Valero Rioja. On 19 November, the EP's track list was released online. Two days later, the official remix of "Teléfono" was released on digital music platforms. It features Venezuelan personality Lele Pons. On 22 November, the singer announced the first EP signing parties in Barcelona, Seville and Madrid. The song "Popcorn" accompanied this announcement.

== Promotion ==
=== Singles ===
In April 2018, Aitana flew to Los Angeles where she worked with Latin American producers Mauricio Rengifo and Andrés Torres who also produced the international hit "Despacito" by Luis Fonsi and Daddy Yankee. Aitana released the first single from her first musical project, "Teléfono", on 27 July of that same year. This reached the first position in the PROMUSICAE sales list and remained there six consecutive weeks. The music video for the song was premiered simultaneously with the song.

In November 2018 she announced that the EP's second single would be "Vas a quedarte". The song went on to become Aitana's third number-one single in Spain, additionally being certified gold. It has also gone on to become the most-streamed song in its first twenty-four hours on Spotify Spain, surpassing the previous record which was also held by her previous release "Teléfono".

=== Promotional singles ===
During Aitana's visit to El Hormiguero 3.0 in October 2018, she commented that she would be recording a music video for the official remix of "Teléfono" in California at the end of that month. She also took the opportunity to announce that it would be in collaboration with the Venezuelan singer Lele Pons. On 20 November, Universal Music announced that the remix would be released on 21 November 2018. It began to air on radio stations from 25 November, thanks to the radio deal with Los 40. The music video for the song reached three million views in less than a day.

== Track listing ==
No.	Title	Writer(s)	Producer(s)	Length
1.	"Teléfono"	Aitana; Mauricio Rengifo; Andrés Torres	Mauricio Rengifo; Andrés Torres	2:43
2.	"Stupid"	Par Almqvist; August Vinberg; Grace Tither; Jaramye Daniels; Jeremy Dussolliett	Total Ape	2:54
3.	"Mejor que tú"	Eva Ruiz; Germán Gonzalo Duque Molano; Felipe González Abad; Pedro Malaver Turbay	Nabález; Mango	3:11
4.	"Popcorn"	Aitana; Tat Tong; Jovany Barreto	The Swaggernautz	2:38
5.	"Vas a quedarte"	Aitana; Juan Pablo Isaza; Juan Pablo Villamil	Isaza	3:46
6.	"Teléfono" (Remix) (with Lele Pons)	Aitana; Mauricio Rengifo; Andrés Torres	Mauricio Rengifo; Andrés Torres	2:44

== Charts ==
=== Weekly charts ===
Weekly chart performance for Tráiler
Chart (2018)	Peak position
Spanish Albums (PROMUSICAE)	1

=== Year-end charts ===
Year-end chart performance for Tráiler
Chart (2018)	Position
Spanish Albums (PROMUSICAE)	17
Chart (2019)	Position
Spanish Albums (PROMUSICAE)	27

== Certifications ==
Region	Certification	Certified units/sales
Chile	Gold	2,500
Spain (PROMUSICAE)	Platinum	40,000^{‡}
^{‡} Sales+streaming figures based on certification alone.

== Release history ==
Region	Date	Format(s)	Label
Various	30 November 2018	CD; digital download	Universal Music
