= Me quedo =

2019 song by Aitana and Lola Indigo

"Me Quedo"

Single by Aitana and Lola Indigo

from the album Spoiler
- Language: Spanish
- English title: "I'm Staying"
- Released: 28 June 2019
- Recorded: 2019
- Genre: Urban pop
- Length: 2:54
- Label: Universal Music
- Songwriters: Pablo Díaz-Reixa; Aitana Ocaña; Cristian Quirante Catalán; Felipe González Abad; Leticia Sala; Miriam Doblas Muñoz
- Producers: El Guincho; Alizzz

Aitana singles chronology
"Con La Miel En Los Labios" (2019)	"Me Quedo" (2019)	"+ (Más)" (2019)

Lola Indigo singles chronology
"Maldición" (2019)	"Me Quedo" (2019)	"Lola Bunny" (2019)

Music video
- "Me Quedo" on YouTube

"Me quedo" (transl. "I'm Staying") is a song recorded by Spanish singer Aitana in collaboration with Lola Indigo. Produced by El Guincho and Alizzz, the song was released as the third and final single of Aitana's debut studio album Spoiler (2019) on 28 June 2019 through Universal Music. Its respective music video was produced by Canada Editorial.

== Background ==
In October 2017 both singers entered the ninth series of television music competition Operación Triunfo where they ended in second and sisteenth place respectively. After they left the contest they started working on their own musical projects. Thus, Miriam Doblas made up her artistic name Lola Indigo and reunited four friends to be her backup dancers while Aitana started working on her debut album in Los Angeles. They reunited in the recording studio in Spain after being separated for a long time after the label reunited them in order to collaborate.

The song was not intended to be a duet but a solo song. Barcelonian producer Alizzz stated that "the label reunited all of us. I did the beat production and Pablo wrote much of the lyrics. I brought the idea of the beat, which was based mainly on the vibe and the main melody in the drop. From there we built the lyrics the same day and recorded it. Then Aitana came to my studio to re-record some parts. Indigo jumped in the song after it was almost completed". The song was announced on 24 May 2019, when Aitana revealed the tracklist of her debut album on Instagram and impacted the radio on June 28, the same day the music video was released.

== Composition ==
The track was composed by Felipe González Abad, Leticia Sala, both of the performers, El Guincho and Alizzz with the last one also producing the track. The song talks about a woman at a night party and being chased by a guy, which she doesn't like. Thus, she says that she wants him to leave since she will not because it was him who limited her freedom of movement. The dissonant sounds of the song help to evoke a sense of bewilderment typical of a night of intoxication.

== Commercial performance ==
"Me Quedo" debuted on the sixth position on the PROMUSICAE singles chart and stayed in the chart for 35 consecutive weeks, leaving it in February 2020. The track was certified gold in two weeks after its radio impact. After a couple weeks it was certified platinum for selling over 40,000 copies in Spain.

During the 2019-20 coronavirus pandemic, the song was used by El Programa de Ana Rosa to raise awareness to stay at home during the national quarantine.

== Music video ==
The music video for "Me Quedo", produced by the Catalan company Canada Editorial, who have also worked with internationally known artists like Rosalía or Dua Lipa, was recorded in May 2019 in the Monegros Desert, in the autonomous community of Aragon. It shows Aitana, who has recently cried, waiting for a bus in the middle of the desert dragging a suitcase. Indigo is inside the bus alongside multiple dancers. The music video premiered on 28 June 2019 on YouTube and received over a million views in its first 24 hours. It was nominated for "Video of the Year" at Los40 Music Awards.

== Charts ==
Chart (2019)	Peak position
Spain (PROMUSICAE)	6

== Certifications ==
Region	Certification	Certified units/sales
Spain (Promusicae)	Platinum	40,000^{‡}
^{‡} Sales+streaming figures based on certification alone.

== Accolades ==
Year	Organization	Category	Nominee/work	Result
2019	LOS40 Music Awards	Video of the Year	"Me Quedo"	Nominated

== Release history ==
Country	Date	Format	Label
Various	7 June 2019	Digital download; streaming	Universal Music
Spain	28 June 2019	Contemporary hit radio	Universal Music
