= + (Más) =

2019 song by Aitana and Cali y El Dandee

Single by Aitana and Cali y El Dandee

from the album 11 Razones
- Language: Spanish
- English title: "More"
- Released: December 18, 2019
- Genre: Power pop
- Length: 3:39
- Label: Universal Music
- Songwriter(s): Aitana Ocaña; Alejandro Rengifo; Andrés Torres; Mauricio Rengifo
- Producer(s): Torres; Rengifo

Aitana singles chronology
"Me Quedo" (2019)	"+ (Más)" (2019)	"Si tú la quieres" (2020)

Cali y El Dandee singles chronology
"Voy Por Ti" (2019)	"+ (Más)" (2019)	"La Noche Entera" (2020)

Music video
- "+" on YouTube

"+ (Más)" (previously registered as "+", stylized in all caps; transl. "More") is a song by Spanish singer Aitana and Colombian duo Cali y El Dandee. The song was released on December 18, 2019 through Universal Music as the lead single of Aitana's upcoming second studio album 11 Razones (2020). It was written by Aitana, Cali y El Dandee and Andrés Torres. The song debuted at number 21 on the Spanish single chart with only two days of tracking, making it the only song in Spanish chart history to reach this position with within two days. The song peaked at number two in its second week.

== Background ==
During the summer 2019, Aitana began hinting at a new single that would feature a well-known artist. Originally scheduled to be released in November, the singer announced the release of "+" through her social media on 4 December 2019. The featured artist remained unknown for months. Aitana and the duo first met in April 2018 in Los Angeles when they helped her record her debut studio album. In 2019, the duo eventually called her again in order to make a song together. The first teaser of the song was released on 16 December.

== Composition ==
The song was composed by the three performers alongside Andrés Torres in Los Angeles and talks about "summer love affairs that are very short but very intense". The performers constantly play with the words "plus" and "minus" as symbols during the song. The artists later revealed that they wanted "+" to have a 2000s pop sound similar to Avril Lavigne's "Complicated". The song goes progressively in crescendo.

== Music video ==
The music video, directed by Venezuelan artist Nuno Gomes, was recorded in Buenos Aires between 15 and 16 October 2019, and gained over one million views in its first 24 hours.

== Charts ==
=== Weekly charts ===
Weekly chart performance for "+ (Más)"
Chart (2019–20)	Peak position
Ecuador (National-Report)	11
Paraguay Pop (Monitor Latino)	11
Spain (PROMUSICAE)	2

=== Year-end charts ===
2020 year-end chart performance for "+ (Más)"
Chart (2020)	Position
Argentina Airplay (Monitor Latino)	62
Spain (PROMUSICAE)	16
Venezuela Airplay (Monitor Latino)	100

== Certifications ==
Certifications and sales for "+ (Más)"
Region	Certification	Certified units/sales
Mexico (AMPROFON)	2× Platinum+Gold	150,000^{‡}
Spain (PROMUSICAE)	4× Platinum	240,000^{‡}
^{‡} Sales+streaming figures based on certification alone.

== Release history ==
Release dates for "+ (Más)"
Country	Date	Format	Label
Various	18 December 2019	Digital download; streaming	Universal Music
Spain	3 January 2020	Contemporary hit radio	Universal Music
