= Presiento =

Single by Morat with Aitana

from the album Balas Perdidas (Edición Especial)
- Language: Spanish
- English title: "I Feel"
- Released: 12 April 2019
- Recorded: December 2018
- Genre: Pop
- Length: 2:54
- Label: Universal Music
- Songwriters: Aitana Ocaña; Juan Pablo Isaza Pineros; Juan Pablo Villamil; Martin Vargas Morales; Simón Vargas
- Producer: Juan Pablo Isaza

Morat singles chronology
"No Se Va" (2019)	"Presiento" (2019)	"Déjame Ir" (2019)

Aitana singles chronology
"Vas a quedarte" (2018)	"Presiento" (2019)	"Nada sale mal" (2019)

Music video
- "Presiento" on YouTube

"Presiento" is a song by Colombian pop band Morat in collaboration with Spanish singer Aitana. The song was written by all four members of the group and Aitana and produced by Juan Pablo Isaza who is the band's lead vocalist. The song was released by Universal Music Group on April 12, 2019. A music video, directed by Lyona, a Spanish-born illustrator, accompanied its release the same day. The song was included in the re-issue of their second studio album Balas perdidas, which was released on May 10, 2019.

== Background ==
In September 2018, Spanish singer Aitana posted on her Instagram Stories some pictures of her and Morat in a recording studio in Madrid. In one of these posts, they announced that they had already written and recorded a huge ballad for the Spanish's debut extended play, Tráiler. That song ended up being "Vas a quedarte", the EP's second official single, released in December of that same year. Even though that collaboration had already happened, the media began talking about a second collaboration between these two artists. On April 9, 2019, Morat announced through their respective social media profiles that a new song called "Presiento" featuring Aitana would be released in three days. The song's cover art was released the day after. A snippet of "Presiento" was unveiled on April 11. Aitana sang as well a snippet of the song in Madrid that same day as part of Los40 Stage acoustic concert series.

== Reception ==
The song received more than 600,000 streams in Spotify in its first 24 hours. After that period of time, "Presiento" became the song with the highest debut in Spain, with more than 230,000 streams there, beating Rosalía and J Balvin's 2019 track "Con altura".

== Music video ==
Morat shared a preview of the music video on April 10, 2019. The video itself premiered on April 12, 2019 on the band's YouTube channel. The video features all four members of Morat and Aitana. The last one is dressed as a mermaid during the music video. The music video was directed by Lyona, being the first time they collaborate. It was viewed more than 2 million times in 24 hours.

== Charts ==
Country	Chart	Peak position
Spain	PROMUSICAE	9
Spain	Radios Top 50	1

== Certifications ==
Region	Certification	Certified units/sales
Spain (Promusicae)	2× Platinum	80,000^{‡}
^{‡} Sales+streaming figures based on certification alone.

== Release history ==
Country	Date	Format	Label
Various	12 April 2019	Digital download · streaming	Universal Music
Spain	14 April 2019	Contemporary hit radio	Universal Music
