= Si tú la quieres =

2020 song by David Bisbal and Aitana

"Si Tú La Quieres"

Single by David Bisbal and Aitana

from the album En Tus Planes
- Language: Spanish
- English title: "If You Love Her"
- Released: 3 April 2020
- Recorded: February 2020
- Genre: Latin pop Reggaeton
- Length: 3:45
- Label: Universal Music
- Songwriter: David Bisbal · María Concepción Mendivil Feito · Pablo Luís Cebrián Valera
- Producer: Pablo Cebrián

David Bisbal singles chronology
"En Tus Planes" (2020)	"Si Tú La Quieres" (2020)	"Amor Amé" (2020)

Aitana singles chronology
"+ (Más)" (2019)	"Si Tú La Quieres" (2020)	"Enemigos" (2020)

Music video
- "Si Tú La Quieres" on YouTube

"Si Tú La Quieres" (transl. "If You Love Her") is a song recorded by Spanish singer David Bisbal for his seventh studio album En Tus Planes (2020). A fan favorite, the song was remixed and released as a single on April 3, 2020 through Universal Music this time featuring Spanish singer Aitana. The track was certified Gold in Spain for selling over 20,000 copies on May 12.

== Background ==
Bisbal and Aitana began interacting in spring 2018 after the ninth series of Operación Triunfo had come to an end. Since they are both the runner-ups of the show (Bisbal in 2001 and Aitana in 2017), he invited her to perform at one of his sold-out concerts at the Palau Sant Jordi, Spain's largest indoor arena. They have had a close friendly relationship since that moment. During that period they started negotiations to collaborate musically talking. The collaboration was announced on March 30, 2020 through their respective social media profiles as well as the single's cover art. A snippet of the song was released the day after. The release of the cover art caused major controversy because of its low quality and lack of attractiveness. Critics and consumers even compared it to a "porn website banner".

== Music video ==
The music video for "Si Tú La Quieres" was scheduled to be filmed in mid-March in Medellín, Colombia but got cancelled because of Spain's national quarantine caused by the coronavirus pandemic beginning on March 15, 2020. Since the single's radio impact and release was already programmed, the singers improvised a homemade music video filled with images of doctors and nurses dancing around hospitals in order to make it a tribute to Spain's health workers. The video was released on YouTube on April 2, receiving over 10 million views in its first week.

== Charts ==
=== Weekly charts ===
Weekly chart performance for "Si tú la quieres"
Chart (2019–20)	Peak position
Argentina Airplay (Monitor Latino)	16
Paraguay Pop (Monitor Latino)	14
Spain (PROMUSICAE)	13
Uruguay (Monitor Latino)	8

=== Year-end charts ===
2020 year-end chart performance for "Si tú la quieres"
Chart (2020)	Position
Argentina Airplay (Monitor Latino)	44
Spain (PROMUSICAE)	34

== Certifications ==
Certifications and sales for "Si tú la quieres"
Region	Certification	Certified units/sales
Mexico (AMPROFON)	2× Platinum+Gold	150,000^{‡}
Spain (Promusicae)	4× Platinum	400,000^{‡}
United States (RIAA)	2× Platinum (Latin)	120,000^{‡}
^{‡} Sales+streaming figures based on certification alone.

== Release history ==
Release dates for "Si tú la quieres"
Country	Date	Format	Label
Various	January 3, 2020	Digital download; streaming (solo)	Universal Music
Various	April 3, 2020	Digital download; streaming	Universal Music
Spain	April 19, 2020	Contemporary hit radio	Universal Music
