= Lo malo =

"Lo Malo"

Single by Aitana and Ana Guerra
- Language: Spanish
- Released: January 28, 2018
- Recorded: January 2018
- Genre: Latin pop
- Length: 3:00
- Label: Universal Music Spain
- Songwriters: Tye Morgan; Will Simms; Brisa Fenoy
- Producer: Antonio Ferrara

Aitana singles chronology
"Arde" (2018)	"Lo Malo" (2018)	"Teléfono" (2018)

Ana Guerra singles chronology
"Lo Malo" (2018)	"El Remedio" (2018)

Music video
- "Lo Malo" on YouTube

"Lo Malo" (previously known as "Chico Malo") is a song by Spanish singers Aitana and Ana Guerra, originally written in English under the title "Boy No Good" by Tye Morgan and Will Simms and adapted into Spanish language by Brisa Fenoy. It was released on January 28, 2018 as one of the candidate songs to represent Spain in the Eurovision Song Contest 2018, but it finished in third place and "Tu canción" was selected. A revamped radio version was released on April 6, 2018. The single topped the Spanish Singles Chart and received a fivefold platinum certification. A remix version featuring Colombian singer Greeicy and Argentine singer Tini was released on August 24, 2018.

== Eurovision Song Contest ==
On 4 December 2017, the Spanish broadcaster Televisión Española (TVE) confirmed that they would use the successful music reality program Operación Triunfo to select their act for the Eurovision Song Contest 2018. It was later revealed on 20 December that the final five singers of the program's ninth series would perform in "Gala Eurovisión", which would be where the Spanish public would choose both the song and its performers for the Eurovision Song Contest. The nine competing songs were unveiled on 23 January 2018. "Lo Malo" was first presented as "Chico Malo", but the song's title was changed two days later because of copyright issues. Gala Eurovisión was held on 29 January. "Lo malo" was one of the top three songs in the first round of voting, qualifying to the second round where it placed third with 26% of the vote.

The Spanish branch of OGAE, the international fan club of the Eurovision Song Contest, selected “Lo Malo” to represent Spain in the visual event OGAE Second Chance Contest in 2018.

== Track listing ==
Digital download
No.	Title	Length
1.	"Lo Malo"	3:00

Remix
No.	Title	Length
1.	"Lo Malo – Remix" (featuring Greeicy and Tini)	3:04

== Charts ==
=== Weekly charts ===
Chart (2018)	Peak position
Panama Pop (Monitor Latino)	6
Spain (PROMUSICAE)	1
Venezuela (National-Report)	27

=== Year-end charts ===
Chart (2018)	Position
Spain (PROMUSICAE)	1

== Certifications ==
Region	Certification	Certified units/sales
Ecuador	Gold	
Spain (Promusicae)	5× Platinum	200,000^{‡}
United States (RIAA)	Gold (Latin)	30,000^{‡}
^{‡} Sales+streaming figures based on certification alone.

== Release history ==
Region	Date	Format	Version	Label
Worldwide	28 January 2018	Digital download	Original	Universal Music Spain
Worldwide	6 April 2018	Digital download	Revamped	Universal Music Spain
Spain	6 April 2018	CD single	Revamped	Universal Music Spain
Worldwide	24 August 2018	Digital download	Remix	Universal Music Spain

== Other media ==
In April 2018, Inditex-owned brand Stradivarius released a T-shirt inspired by the song which was sold out in less than twenty four hours.
