= Teléfono =

Single by Aitana

from the album Tráiler and Spoiler
- Language: Spanish
- English title: "Telephone"
- Released: 27 July 2018 (original); 21 November 2018 (remix)
- Recorded: April 2018
- Genre: Pop
- Length: 2:43
- Label: Universal Music Spain
- Songwriters: Aitana Ocaña; Andrés Torres; Mauricio Rengifo
- Producers: Andrés Torres; Mauricio Rengifo

Aitana singles chronology
"Lo malo" (2018)	"Teléfono" (2018)	"Vas a quedarte" (2018)

Lele Pons singles chronology
"Celoso" (2018)	"Teléfono (Remix)" (2018)	"Bloqueo" (2019)

Music video
- "Teléfono" on YouTube

"Teléfono" (transl. Telephone) is a song recorded by Spanish singer Aitana, written by Aitana, Andrés Torres, and Mauricio Rengifo, and produced by the latter two. The song was released as a single by Universal Music Spain on 27 July 2018. A remix featuring Venezuelan Internet personality and singer Lele Pons was released on 21 November.

Commercially, "Teléfono" became Aitana's second number-one single in Spain after "Lo malo", and has been certified 3× platinum in her home country by Productores de Música de España. A music video for the song was released prior to its single release on 26 July 2018, which went on to become the most-watched Vevo music video within 24 hours of all-time in Spain. The song was certified Platinum in the United States in May 2020.

== Track listing ==
Digital download
No.	Title	Length
1.	"Teléfono"	2:43

== Charts ==
=== Weekly charts ===
Chart (2018)	Peak position
Panama Pop (Monitor Latino)	11
Spain (Promusicae)	1
Spain Airplay (PROMUSICAE)	4

Remix

Chart (2018)	Peak position
Colombia (National-Report)	46
Nicaragua Pop (Monitor Latino)	16
Panama Pop (Monitor Latino)	15
Venezuela (National-Report)	75

=== Year-end charts ===
Chart (2018)	Position
Spain (PROMUSICAE)	9

== Certifications ==
Region	Certification	Certified units/sales
Mexico (AMPROFON)	Platinum+Gold	90,000^{‡}
Spain (Promusicae)	4× Platinum	160,000^{‡}
United States (RIAA)	Platinum (Latin)	60,000^{‡}
^{‡} Sales+streaming figures based on certification alone.

== Release history ==
Region	Date	Format	Label
Various	27 July 2018	Digital download	Universal Music Spain
Various	21 November 2018	Remix (with Lele Pons)	Universal Music Spain
