= Vas a quedarte =

"Vas a Quedarte"

Single by Aitana

from the EP Tráiler
- Language: Spanish
- English title: "You will stay"
- Released: 9 December 2018
- Recorded: September 2018
- Genre: Pop
- Length: 3:46
- Label: Universal Music Spain
- Songwriters: Aitana Ocaña; Juan Pablo Villamil; Juan Pablo Isaza
- Producer: Isaza

Aitana singles chronology
"Teléfono" (2018)	"Vas a Quedarte" (2018)	"Presiento" (2019)

"Vas a quedarte" (transl. "You're Going To Stay") is a song recorded by Spanish singer Aitana, written by Aitana, Juan Pablo Villamil, and Juan Pablo Isaza, and produced by the latter of the three. The song was released as the second single from Aitana's debut extended play Tráiler on 9 December 2018.

Commercially, "Vas a quedarte" became Aitana's third number-one single in Spain, and has been certified gold in her home country by Productores de Música de España. The song has additionally since become the most-streamed song in its first twenty-four hours on Spotify Spain, surpassing the previous record which was also held by Aitana's previous release "Teléfono".

== Music video ==
A music video for "Vas a quedarte" was released on 14 December through Aitana's YouTube channel. The video was directed by Pablo Hernández, and also featured actor Àlex Maruny who appeared alongside Aitana. Within three days, the video had received over two million views.

== Live performances ==
The song's first live performance was during the Gala de Navidad Christmas special of series ten of Operación Triunfo on 26 December.

== Charts ==
Chart (2018–19)	Peak position
Spain (Promusicae)	1

== Certifications ==
Region	Certification	Certified units/sales
Spain (Promusicae)	3× Platinum	120,000^{‡}
^{‡} Sales+streaming figures based on certification alone.

== Release history ==
Region	Date	Format	Label
Various	9 December 2018	Digital download	Universal Music Spain
