= Nerea Rodríguez =

Spanish singer (born 1999)

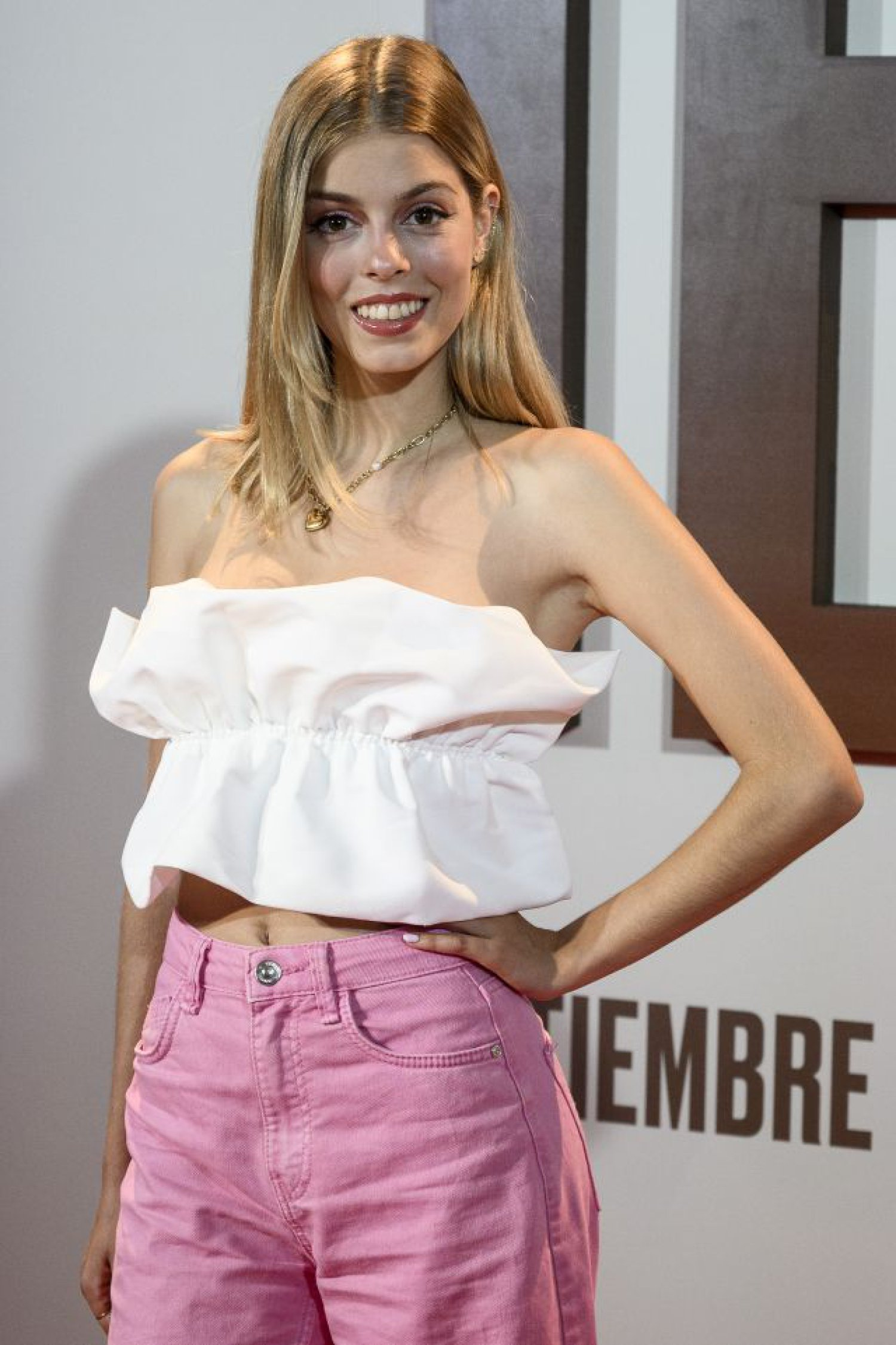
- Rodríguez in 2022
- Born: Nerea Rodríguez Rodríguez; 7 February 1999 (age 27); Gavá, Spain
- Occupations: Singer and actress
- Years active: 2017–present

Nerea Rodríguez Rodríguez (Gavá, Barcelona, February 7, 1999) is a Spanish singer who rose to fame for her participation in the program Operación Triunfo 2017.

== Biography ==
At 14 years old, she participated in the blind auditions of the Telecinco program, La Voz Kids Spain, where she was finally not selected.

At 18 years old, in 2017, she participated in the casting of Operación Triunfo in Barcelona. She managed to pass all the phases of the casting and participated in Gala 0 of the program, which she also managed to pass, reaching Gala 10, battling with Agoney in one of the most hard-fought expulsions of the program.

After the program, along with his 15 companions, she toured OT 2017 through numerous Spanish cities, filling stadiums or pavilions with more than 60,000 people in some of them, and in the meantime also attending record signings. The last concert was on December 28, 2018 and there he had the opportunity to present his single for the first time.

She has gone to Pasapalabra as a guest in 4 programs, three of them in August 2018 to promote the play La llamada where she plays María Casado since May 2018. She also went to Telemadrid to the program La Báscula in December and to Castilla-La Mancha Media to the program Estando Contigo Noche in November, in both to present her single Y ahora no.

In May 2019, UglyDolls: Extraordinariamente feos, a cartoon film in which she voices the protagonist, was released. In 2019 she stars in the musical Aladdín in Barcelona, which she combines with her work in La Llamada. That same year she dubbed the fairy godmother in the film Playmobil: The Movie.

In 2021 she came second in the eighth season of Tu Cara Me Suena.

== Artistic career ==
=== 2017-2018: Operación Triunfo 2017 ===
Nerea Rodrguez entered directly into the academy of the talent show Operación Triunfo 2017 in Gala 0 of the program, held on October 23, 2017, and would be expelled in Gala 10, on January 8, 2018, against Agoney with a tight percentage of 47%. Among her most outstanding performances are Quédate Conmigo by Pastora Soler, Symphony with Agoney, or Listen by Beyoncé, for which she was expelled.

Once the contest was over, Nerea and her companions toured throughout Spain, performing in emblematic venues such as the Palau Sant Jordi in Barcelona, the Estadio Olímpico de La Cartuja in Sevilla, the Bizkaia Arena in Baracaldo, or the Estadio Santiago Bernabéu in Madrid, where she sang alongside Pastora Soler.

=== 2018-2019: La Llamada, first single and dub. ===
On May 10, 2018, Nerea announced that she would be the new protagonist of the musical La Llamada, written and directed by Javier Ambrossi and Javier Calvo. She is currently still playing María Casado at the Teatro Lara in Madrid.

On November 16, what would be the artist's first single and, therefore, her letter of introduction, was released. Y Ahora No is the name of her first single, which manages to become number 1 on iTunes as soon as it is released, also number 1 on Amazon Music, and also reigns for a consecutive week at the top of the Google Play sales list. The video clip also gets the first position on iTunes and is placed in the top 2 YouTube trends.

In December 2018, she participated in the Christmas TV program of Televisión Española, where she participated with a version of the song Fame, along with his academy mates Roi Méndez, Ricky Merino, and Marina Jade. The presenter of the format, Roberto Leal, also collaborated with them. That same month, it was announced that she would be a voice actress in the new Illumination film UglyDolls, in which she will star alongside Pitbull and will be released in theaters in May 2019.

In 2019, she announced that she would be part of the Spanish dubbing cast of the movie Playmobil: The Movie, voicing the fairy godmother.

=== 2020: Tu Cara me Suena. ===
His participation in the popular Spanish show Tu cara me suena alongside well-known faces such as Mario Vaquerizo, Gemeliers, Belinda Washington and Jorge González was announced in December 2019. During his passage through the contest, in which she came in second place, she imitated singers such as Ariana Grande, Zara Larsson, Rosalía or Camila Cabello, always occupying the top positions on the leaderboard.

=== Concerts ===
At the beginning of February 2019, she announced a solo concert tour in different Spanish cities, including Madrid, Seville, and Barcelona. That same month, it was announced that she would play Jasmine in the musical Aladdín at the Teatro Condal in Barcelona. On February 17, 2019, Nerea performed at the Gala of the Children's Queen of the Carnival of Santa Cruz de Tenerife.

On the other hand, at the end of the year, she announced a second tour, this time with her partners Ricky Merino and Raoul Vázquez, called #3TOUR and that would tour several cities during the first months of 2020. Nerea announced through social networks the return to concerts with Nerea en concierto, in Viladecans, Madrid, and Valencia.

== Television career ==
=== Television ===
Television
Year	Program	Channel	Role
2014	La voz Kids	Telecinco	Contestant – Eliminated
2017–2018	Operación Triunfo 2017	La 1	Contestant – 9th expelled
2018	Operación Triunfo 2018	La 1	Guest
2018; 2019; 2020	Pasapalabra	Telecinco and Antena 3	Guest
2019	La mejor canción jamás cantada	La 1	Contestant with Raoul Vázquez and guest
2019	Trabajo Temporal	La 1	Guest with Agoney
2020–2021	Tu cara me suena	Antena 3	Contestant – 2nd finalist

== Discography ==
=== Singles ===
- 2018: «Y ahora no».
- 2019: «Tu segunda opción»
- 2019: «Noche de paz»
- 2021: «Los recuerdos»
- 2021: "Doble o Nada"
- 2021: "Papallones"
- 2022: "Señales"
- 2022: "Malibú"
- 2022: "RSVP" featuring Dominik Klein
- 2023: "Por Primera Vez"
- 2023: "Rosas" featuring Sandra Groove
- 2023: "Perdona si te olvido" featuring Última Llave

=== EP ===
- 2019: «Diciembres»
- 2021: «Doble o nada»

=== Promotional singles ===
- 2019: «Por Ti» (with Raoul Vázquez as soundtrack of the film Terra Willy: Planeta Desconocido)
- 2019: "Cuenta Conmigo (Run Like The River) (as soundtrack of the film Playmobil: the movie)
- 2021: "Desde Ya" (for the Disney Princess Celebration campaign)

== Dubbing and theater ==
=== Dubbing ===
Dubbing
Year	Film	Character	Directed by
2019	Terra Willy: planeta desconocido	Willy	Eric Tosti
2019	UglyDolls: Extraordinariamente feos	Moxy	Kelly Asbury
2019	Playmobil: La película	Hada Madrina	Lino DiSalvo

=== Theater ===
Theater
Year	Play	Character	Directed by
2018–present	La llamada	María Casado	Javier Ambrossi and Javier Calvo
2019	Aladdín	Jasmine	
