= Ana Guerra discography =

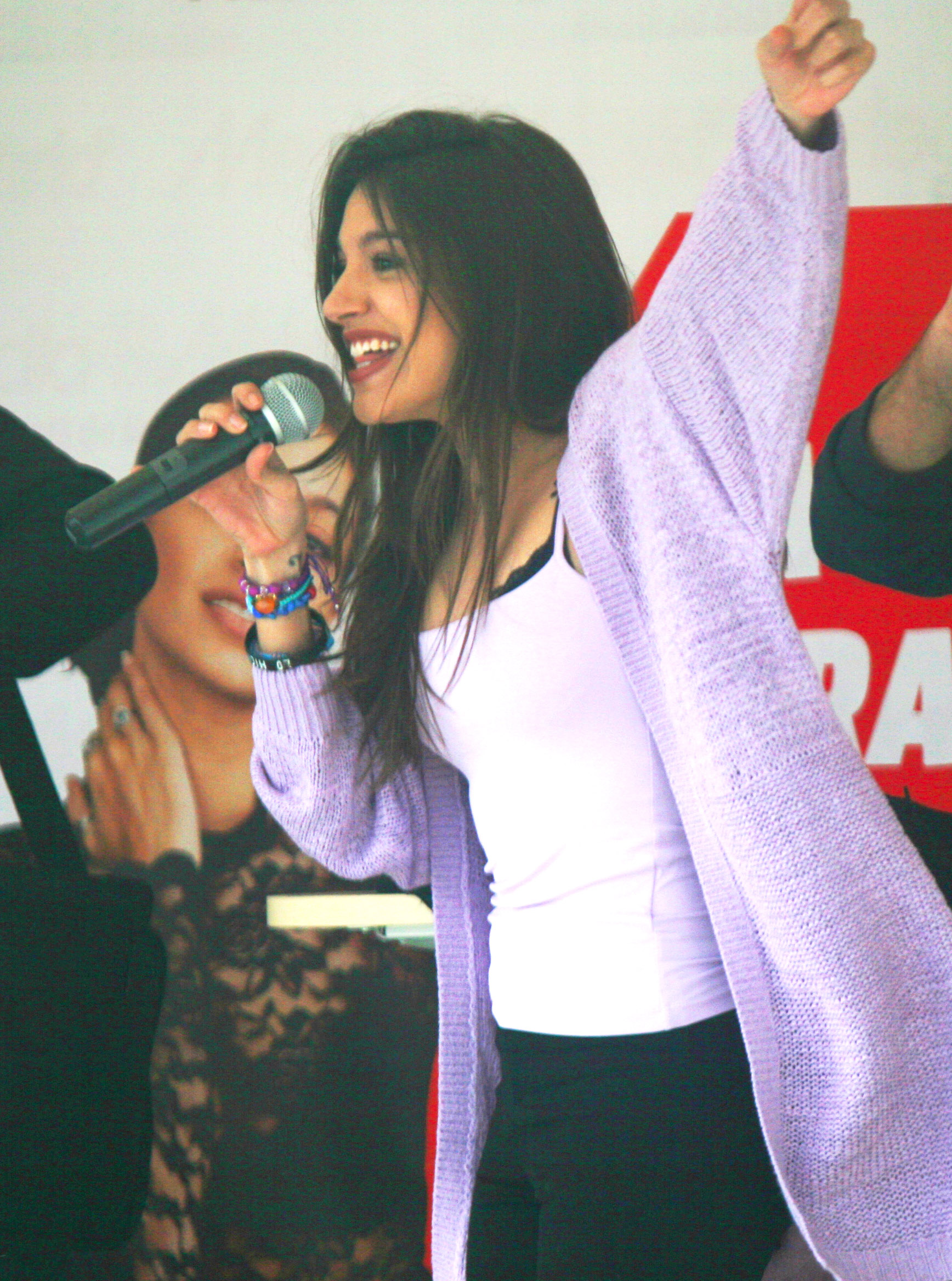
- Ana Guerra during album signing event in Seville in March 2018.
- Studio albums: 2
- EPs: 2
- Singles: 18
- Video albums: 1
- Promotional singles: 2

The discography of Spanish recording artist Ana Guerra consists of two EPs, one compilation album, two studio albums, several singles as a lead artist, several collaborations and other promotional songs.

== Compilation albums ==
List of compilation albums, with selected details and chart positions
Title	Details	Peak chart positions
Title	Details	SPA
Sus Canciones (Operación Triunfo 2017)	Released: 16 March 2018; Label: Universal Spain; Formats: CD, digital download	4

== Studio albums ==
List of studio albums, with selected details
Title	Details	Peak chart positions
Title	Details	SPA
La Luz del Martes	Released: 24 September 2021; Label: Universal Spain; Formats: CD, digital download	4
Sin Final	Released: 27 September 2024; Label: Universal Spain; Formats: CD, digital download	22

== Extended plays ==
List of EPs, with selected details and chart positions shown
Title	Details	Peak chart positions
Title	Details	SPA
Reflexión	Released: 25 January 2019; Label: Universal Spain; Formats: CD, digital download	2

== Singles ==
List of singles, with year released, selected chart positions and certifications, and album name shown
Title	Year	Peak chart positions	Certifications	Album
Title	Year	SPA	Certifications	Album
"Lo malo" (with Aitana or remix featuring Greeicy and Tini)	2018	1	PROMUSICAE: 5× Platinum	Sus Canciones (Operación Triunfo 2017)
"El remedio"	2018	51		Sus Canciones (Operación Triunfo 2017)
"Ni la hora" (with Juan Magán)	2018	2	PROMUSICAE: 3× Platinum	Reflexión
"Bajito"	2018	13	PROMUSICAE: Platinum	Reflexión
"Tarde o temprano"	2020	—		TBA
"Listo va" (with Lérica)	2020	—		TBA
"Tik-Tak"	2021	38		"La Luz del Martes"
"Seis"	2021	—		"La Luz del Martes"
"Qué Sabrán"	2021	41		"La Luz del Martes"
"Si me quisieras"	2023	49		"Érase una vez"
"Tiempo de Descuento"	2023	—		"Érase una vez"
"No Sabe A Nada"	2023	—		
"Contar Mentiras"	2024	—		
"Canción de luto" (with Coti)	2024	—		
"Me Quiero Más a Mí" (with Chenoa)	2024	—		
"La llama"	2025	—		

=== Collaborations ===
2018: «El mundo entero» with Agoney, Raoul Vázquez, Aitana and Lola Índigo

2019: «Desde que te vi» with David Bustamante

2019: «El viajero (Remix) » with Nabález and Yera

2019: «Acepto milagros» with Tiziano Ferro

2020: «Robarte el corazón» with Bombai

2020: «Dos segundos» with Huecco

2020: «Los amigos no se besan en la boca» with Lasso

2020: «¡Contigo siempre es Navidad!» with Raphael, Bely Basarte, María Parrado, Cepeda, Antonio José and Miriam Rodríguez

2021: «Peter Pan» with David Otero

2022: «Voy a pensar en ti» with Fran Perea

== Other charted songs ==
List of non-single chart appearances, with year released, selected chart positions, and album name shown
Title	Year	Peak chart positions	Album
Title	Year	SPA	Album
"Con Una Mirada"	2019	67	Reflexión
