= Roi Méndez =

- Born: Roi Méndez Martínez; 30 September 1993 (age 32); Santiago de Compostela
- Origin: Santiago de Compostela
- Genres: Pop
- Occupations: Singer and guitarist
- Years active: 2017–present
- Label: Universal Music Group
- Website: roimendez.es

Roi Méndez Martínez (born 30 September 1993) is a Spanish singer and guitarist.

== Biography ==
Roi Méndez was born in Santiago de Compostela on 30 September 1993. He got a bachelor's degree in audio technology. He was a member of the Orquesta Olympus, a famous orchestra in Galicia. In 2009 he played in My Camp Rock.

== Career ==
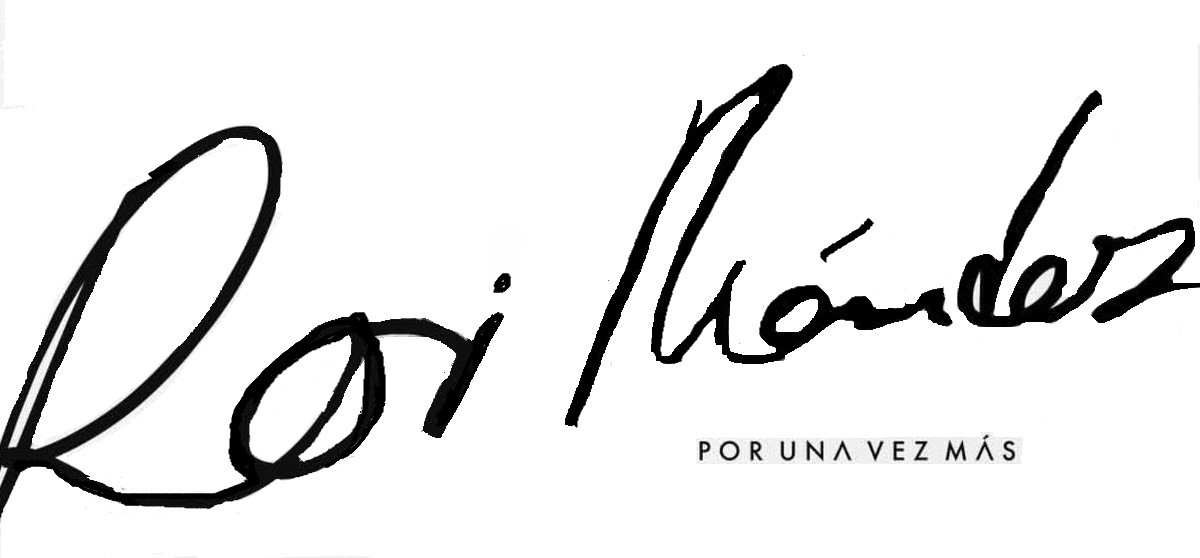
"Por una vez más" jacket

He gained national recognition when he took part in series nine of the reality television music competition Operación Triunfo, where he was the tenth evicted against Ana Guerra. Throughout the contest he performed several songs, but his duet with the winner Amaia Romero, a cover of "Shape of You" by Ed Sheeran, was considered one of the best performances of the contest and was recorded for Romero's album Amaia Romero: Sus canciones.

Once finished the contest, Roi was part of the Spanish Operación Triunfo tour, performing in such notable venues as the Palau Sant Jordi in Barcelona, the Olympic Stadium in La Cartuja in Seville, and the Bizkaia Arena in Bilbao. On 29 June, Roi and the rest of contestants of Operación Triunfo 2017 gave a special charity concert at Santiago Bernabéu Stadium in Madrid, which was attended by 60,000 spectators. He released his first single "Por una vez más" on 15 June 2018. It got more than one millions of views on YouTube. During the Operación Triunfo 2017 tour, Roi performed his debut single "Por una vez más" and "Shape of You" with Amaia Romero. In May 2018 Roi was chosen one of the members of Spanish Eurovision jury during Eurovision Song Contest 2018.

On 10 August 2018 he made a concert in Vigo with his fellow Operación Triunfo 2017 friends Aitana, Ana Guerra, Cepeda and Miriam Rodríguez. Roi was an opening artist with Cepeda and Miriam Rodríguez of the Queen + Adam Lambert's concert in Barcelona on 10 June 2018.

He did a cameo in the second season of the Spanish TV series Paquita Salas (2016). Since September 2018, Roi co-hosts the radio show Vodafone Yu in Los 40, becoming one of the images of the radio station. A study of network influences revealed that Roi was the most engagement instagramer on 2018 due to his skill to create strong relationships with his followers.

On 1 March 2019 he released his second single called "Plumas" and defining it as a modern funky style. The single managed to reach number two on iTunes Spain. On 22 March 2019 Roi released his first full album, Mi lógico desorden. This album entered the Spanish Music Chart with second position and 14 in streaming. The album was during 10 weeks on chart.

He appeared along Ana Guerra in the second episode of 99 lugares donde pasar miedo, aired on 4 May 2019 on Discovery MAX, where they visited the Loch Ness, Comlongon Castle and Greyfriars Kirkyard.

On 22 May 2020 Roi released his third single "Aviones de Papel" with Spanish pop rock band Sinsinati, which became one of the 2020 summer songs of Los 40.

=== Performances on Operación Triunfo ===
Operación Triunfo performances and results
| Week | Song | Result |
|---|---|---|
| Gala 0 | "Don't Worry" | Saved by the jury |
| Gala 1 | "Tu enemigo" (with Ricky Merino) | Nominated by the jury; saved by contestants |
| Gala 2 | "Malibu" (with Miriam Rodríguez) | Nominated by the jury; up for elimination |
| Gala 3 | "When We Were Young" | Saved by public vote; saved by the jury |
| Gala 4 | "There's Nothing Holdin' Me Back" (with Ana Guerra) | Saved by the jury |
| Gala 5 | "Shape of You" (with Amaia Romero) | Saved by the jury |
| Gala 6 | "La llamada" | Nominated by the jury, saved by the Academy staff |
| Gala 7 | "OK" | Favorite of the audience; exempt from nominations |
| Gala 8 | "Versace on the Floor" | Nominated by the jury; up for elimination |
| Gala 9 | "When I Was Your Man" | Saved by public vote; saved by the jury |
| Gala 10 | "Robarte un beso" (with Miriam Rodríguez & Amaia Romero) | Nominated by the jury; up for elimination |
| Gala 10 | "Demons" | Nominated by the jury; up for elimination |
| Gala 11 | "Heaven" | Eliminated by public vote |

== Personal life ==
He is a supporter of LGBT rights. He is influenced by Ed Sheeran, Shawn Mendes, Sting, Bruno Mars, Bryan Adams and Michael Jackson.

== Discography ==
=== Singles ===
| Title | Year | Peak chart positions | Album |
| Title | Year | SPA | Album |
|---|---|---|---|
| "Por una vez más" | 2018 | 31 | Mi Lógico Desorden |
| "Plumas" | 2019 | — | Mi Lógico Desorden |
| "Aviones de papel" ft. Sinsinati | 2020 | - | Aviones de papel (single) |
"—" denotes a single that did not chart or has not yet been released.

=== Albums ===
| Title | Year | Peak chart positions |
| Title | Year | SPA |
|---|---|---|
| "Mi Lógico Desorden" | 2019 | 2 |
"—" denotes an album that did not chart or has not yet been released.

== Filmography ==
=== Television ===
| Year | Title | Role | Notes | Ref. |
|---|---|---|---|---|
| 2009 | My Camp Rock | Himself | Semi-final, evicted | |
| 2017–18 | Operación Triunfo | Himself; contestant | 10th evicted | |
| 2018 | OTVisión | Himself | co-host | |
| 2018 | Paquita Salas | Himself | Cameo appearance | |
| 2019 | La mejor canción jamás cantada | Himself | Contestant; 1 episode | |
| 2020 | Tu cara me suena | The Police | Imitation, Walking on the Moon | |
| 2025 | Top Chef: Dulces y famosos | Himself | Runner-up | |

=== Radio ===
| Year | Title | Role | Ref. |
|---|---|---|---|
| 2018–present | Vodafone Yu | Himself; co-host | |
