= Ana Guerra =

Spanish singer (born 1994)

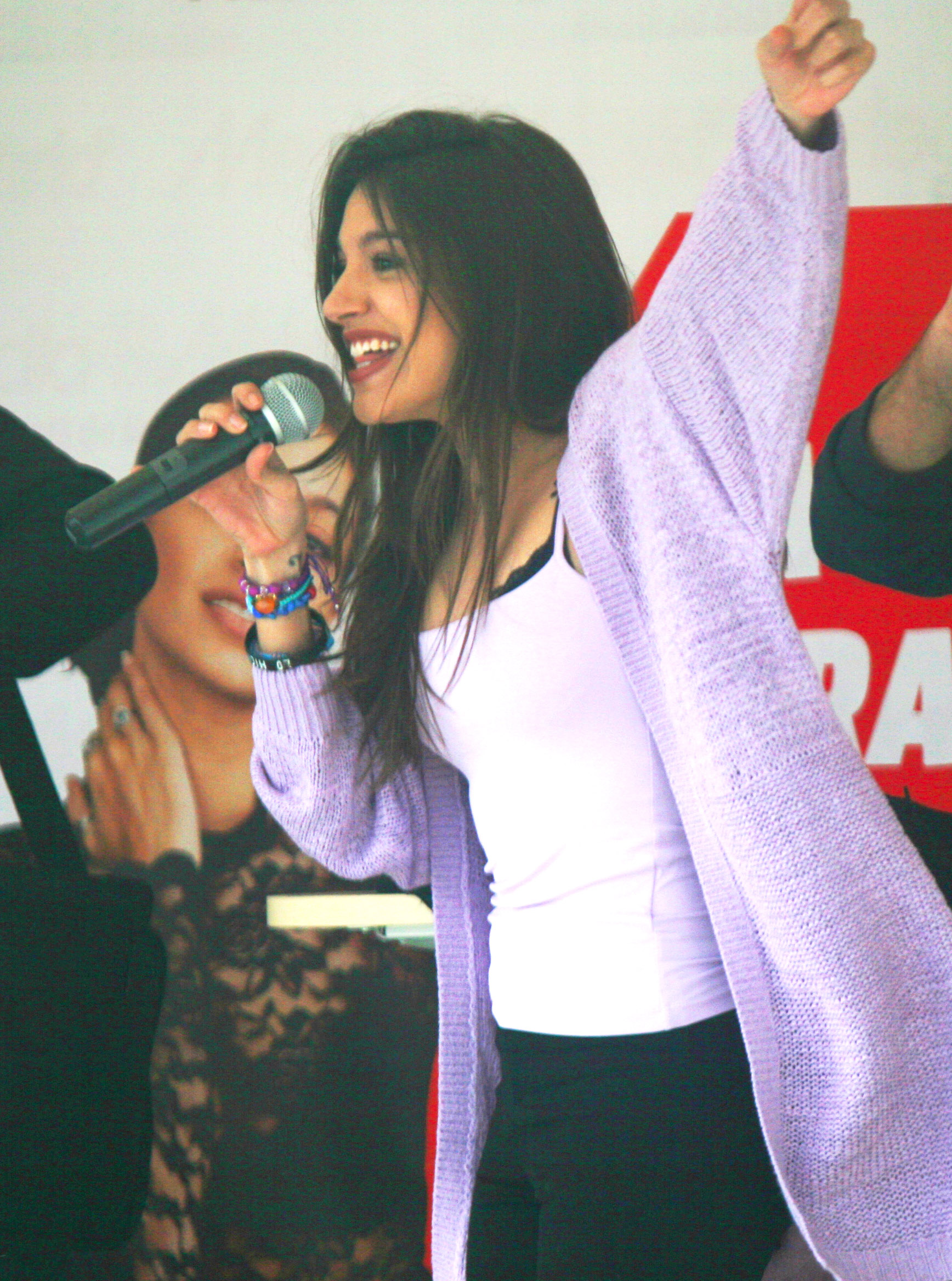
- Guerra performing in 2018

Background information
- Also known as: Ana War; La Bikina
- Born: Ana Alicia Guerra Morales; 18 February 1994 (age 32); San Cristóbal de La Laguna, Tenerife, Spain
- Genres: Pop; Latin pop
- Occupations: Singer, actress
- Years active: 2002–present
- Label: Universal Music
- Spouse: Víctor Elías (m. 2024)
- Website: anaguerraoficial.com

Ana Alicia Guerra Morales (born 18 February 1994), better known as Ana Guerra, is a Spanish singer and musical actress. She rose to prominence when she took part in series nine of the reality television talent competition Operación Triunfo, where she finished in fifth place.

She was a candidate to represent Spain in the Eurovision Song Contest 2018, with two songs, "El remedio", and a duet with fellow contestant Aitana Ocaña entitled "Lo malo". Finally, neither was selected to represent the country in the European contest, while "Lo malo" did get to represent Spain at the OGAE Second Chance Contest. "Lo malo", which was voted in third place with 26%, reached the top of the Spanish chart and obtained a quintuple platinum certification with 180,000 digital purchases.

After her departure from Operación Triunfo 2017, Guerra collaborated with Juan Magán on the song "Ni la hora". In its first week of release, it reached number one on the Spanish songs chart. It was later certified triple platinum in Spain. Her single "Bajito" was also certified gold. In 2018 she became the second Spanish female artist in history to have two songs over 30 million streams on Spotify Spain. The digital newspaper El Español considers her to be one of the most successful contestants of Operación Triunfo.

== Biography ==
Ana Alicia Guerra Morales was born on 18 February 1994 in San Cristóbal de La Laguna, Tenerife, in the Province of Santa Cruz de Tenerife. She is the daughter of Antonio Guerra, a nurse, and Fátima Morales. Her name is in honor of the Mexican-American actress, Ana Alicia, since her parents liked the American series Falcon Crest. She has one brother. In her childhood, one day her father bought a karaoke machine and that same day Ana learned a Tamara song by heart in less than ten minutes.

She studied transverse flute for eight years at the Professional Conservatory of Music of Santa Cruz de Tenerife. Later, Guerra worked as a perfume consultant, waitress, and actress in musicals.

== Career ==
Guerra auditioned for series 9 of Operación Triunfo and was selected to enter the show's "Academy" on 23 October 2017. On the 12th "gala" or live show on 22 January 2018, it was decided by the public that she would be one of the five finalists of the series.

In Operación Triunfo, Guerra also competed to represent Spain in the Eurovision Song Contest 2018 with the entries "El remedio", which she performed solo, and "Lo malo", which she performed in a duet with Aitana. The latter song, originally written in English language by Jess Morgan and Will Simms and adapted into Spanish language by Brisa Fenoy, finished in third place, but went on to become a number-one hit on the Spanish Singles Chart and received a double platinum certification. The single reached number one on the Spanish PROMUSICAE during three weeks. The former entry, "El remedio", which was authored by Nabález, was released as a single in April 2018.

On 6 July 2018, Guerra released a single with Juan Magán titled "Ni la hora". The single debuted at number two on the Spanish Singles Chart, and its official music video got more than 4.5 million views on YouTube in five days. On 6 December 2018 she released the solo single "Bajito", where she appeared with Javier Calvo, Javier Ambrossi, Dulceida, Alba Paul, Miguel Diosdado and Antonia Payeras. It received bad critics due to its erotic content.

On 25 January 2019 she released her first album titled "Reflexión". The album was a success, ranking at number two on the official sales charts. Also at the beginning of that year, Ana participated as guest artist in David Bustamante's new album entitled "Héroes en tiempos de Guerra", specifically in the song "Desde que te vi". Guerra had already sung with Bustamante live at the Caminando Juntos concert at the Santiago Bernabéu Stadium in Madrid in June 2018.

She appeared along Roi Méndez in the second episode of 99 lugares donde pasar miedo, aired on 4 May 2019 on Discovery MAX, where they visited the Loch Ness, Comlongon Castle and Greyfriars Kirkyard.

Between September 2019 and January 2020, Guerra toured 16 cities across Spain with her fellow Operación Triunfo castmate Luis Cepeda on the ImaginBank tour.

By December 2019, Guerra had nine platinum records and two gold records. More than 90,000 followers through their social networks and with more than 85 million views on her YouTube channel. Her EP Reflexión exceeded 100 million views. Also during that year, Guerra shared the stage with Spanish-language music stars like Alejandro Sanz and Juan Luis Guerra.

On 24 September 2021, Ana Guerra's second album called "La luz del martes" was released. The album ranked fourth on the Spanish album chart during the first week of release.

In July of that year, Ana Guerra was confirmed as one of the winners of that year's Premios Dial of Cadena Dial. During the awards ceremony that took place on 24 November, Ana was in charge of presenting the event along with Luis Larrodera and to sing in it.

On 22 January 2022, Ana Guerra performed at the legendary Teatro de la Maestranza in Seville, as part of her tour Lo que nunca te dije.

On 15 December 2023, the new EP titled "Érase una vez" was published, a collection of four songs accompanied by a personalized folder signed by the singer. This is an album dedicated to her fans. It is an album divided into two, the second part was proposed for release in 2024. In August of that year, the title of the second part of this album, "Sin final", was announced, as well as the date of its release, 27 September.

On 21 September, she shared the stage with singer Isabel Pantoja as part of the latter's Gira 50 Aniversario (50th Anniversary Tour), at the Centro Internacional de Ferias y Congresos de Tenerife.

In April 2026, she performed at the OModa Global Music Festival, an international music and culture event held in the city of Wuhu (China).

== Influences ==
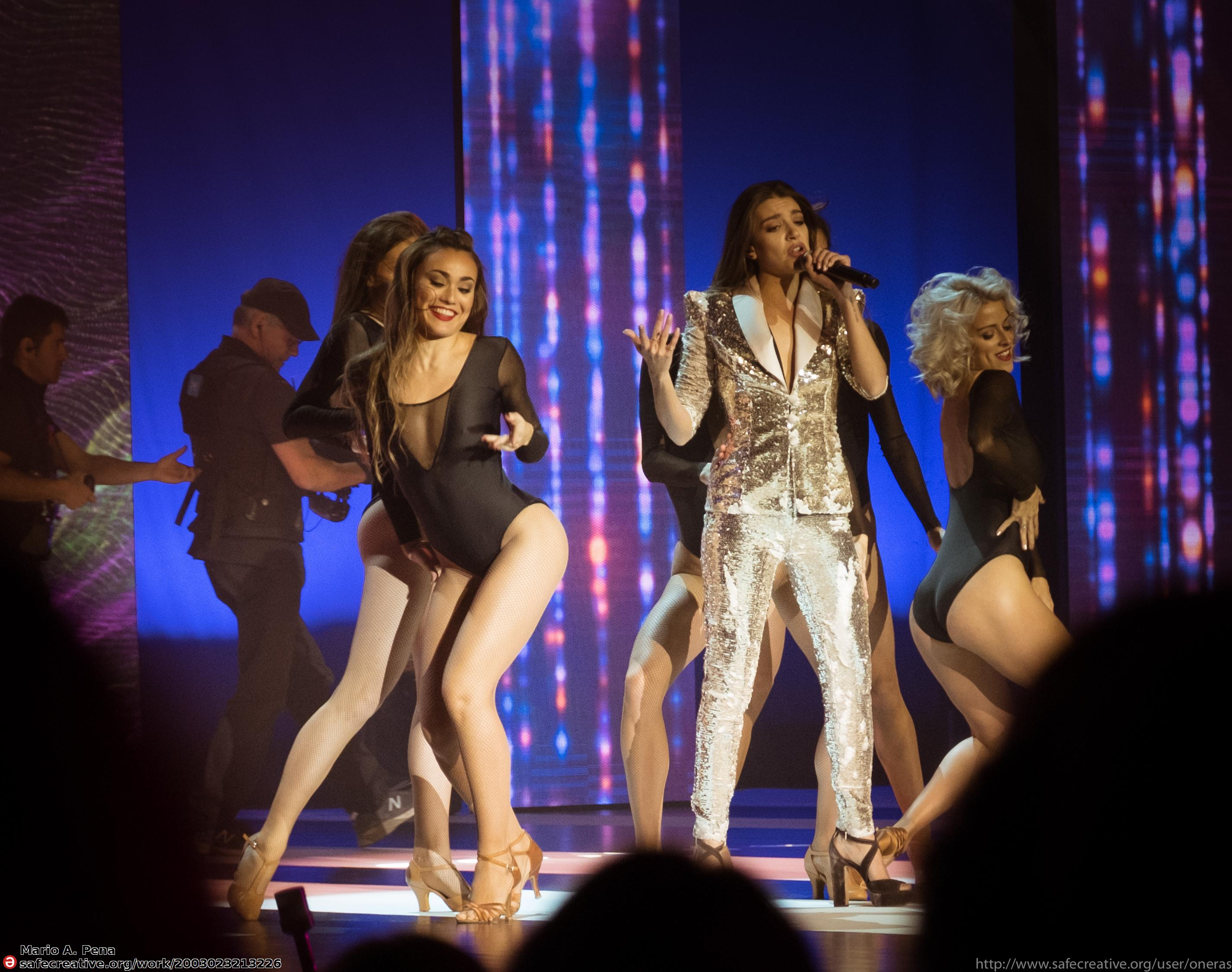
Ana Guerra during her performance at the 2019 Forqué Awards, in Zaragoza.

Guerra cites Juan Luis Guerra, Michael Bublé and Luis Miguel as her influences. Ana also plays the Western concert flute. On 31 December 2018 it was said she will present the Twelve Grapes with Cristina Pedroche and Brays Efe, but finally it was not carried out. She performed with Aitana and Greeicy the song Lo malo during Premio Lo Nuestro 2019 in Miami. Finally, in November 2020 it was announced that Ana Guerra will present the New Year's bells from Santa Cruz de Tenerife live for all of Spain accompanied by Roberto Herrera, presenter of the television network TVE Canarias. The event was followed by 4,734,000 viewers with a 27.2% audience share.

== Personal life ==
Ana Guerra is bisexual.

From 2014 to June 2018, Guerra was in a relationship with the singer, Javier Luis Delgado, better known as Jadel, who won the talent show El Número Uno in 2012.

From 2018 to 2020, Guerra was in a relationship with the actor, Miguel Ángel Muñoz.

Since 2021, Guerra is in a relationship with the actor, singer, musician and musical director, Víctor Elías. In February 2024 they announced their wedding, which would take place on 31 October of that year, being held at the Prados Moros estate, in the Sierra de Guadarrama range in Madrid. The wedding was attended by more than 300 guests, including several personalities from the world of music and television in Spain, and the ceremony was officiated by actor Fran Perea, a friend of the couple. The event was hailed as the wedding of the year by several media outlets. The religious ceremony took place the day before, this one much more intimate than the civil one. It took place in the Chapel of the Virgen del Puerto of Madrid, near the Almudena Cathedral.

== Advertising and other projects ==
In March 2018, after his departure from the program, he recorded the song Fugitiva, which is the header of the series of the same name on TVE.

Ana became the image of the Spanish cosmetic brand Camaleón Cosmetic in June 2018. Months later she would be the promotional image for the Skechers España brand.

She sang with Aitana, Lola Índigo, Raoul Vázquez and Agoney for the Coca-Cola advertising campaign for Christmas.

In September 2019, Guerra was announced as the face of a 2020 collection from the wedding dress company Pronovias.

In September 2020, Ana covers the song by Raffaella Carrà entitled En el amor todo es empezar, and which was the soundtrack of the Spanish film Explota, explota. In November of that year she performed the theme song for a Disney Christmas short film entitled Historias que nos unen.

In early 2021, he collaborated on the video clip for the song Es lo que hay by the singer and fellow OT 2017 member Ricky Merino. This video clip also had the participation of Roi Méndez. On 8 January 2022, Ana Guerra was one of the singers participating in the solidarity concert Más fuerte que el volcán, which was organized by Televisión Española in order to raise funds for those affected by the 2021 Cumbre Vieja volcanic eruption. For her part, on 8 March, Ana participated in the charity concert Mujeres cantan a Rocío Jurado, coinciding with International Women's Day.

In September 2022, he promoted Rakuten TV's adventure reality show Discovering Canary Islands at the San Sebastián Film Festival. It is a program in which the contestants explore various corners of the Canary Islands.

In January 2023, she became a contestant on the third edition of El desafío on Antena 3. For her part, that same month she was confirmed as one of the presenters of the new RTVE musical talent called Cover night, along with Ruth Lorenzo and Abraham Mateo. In April of that year, for its part, it was the image of the Cerveceros de España campaign.

At the end of that year, Ana covered the theme song from the new Disney movie Wish, titled Mi deseo. A song that is the Spanish version of "This Wish", performed by the singer Ariana DeBose in its original version in English. This is the second time that the Canarian singer collaborates with Disney, since in 2020 she already performed the musical theme of a Christmas short film for said entity.

On 23 November 2023, Ana Guerra starred in the Christmas lighting of Madrid from Puerta del Sol. The next day, Ana also participated in the Christmas lighting of her city, San Cristóbal de La Laguna.

Ana Guerra was one of the guests at the eleventh edition of the 11th Platino Awards, held on the night of 20 April 2024, in the Riviera Maya in Mexico. During the gala, Ana sang in three voices with Mariaca Semprún and Majida Issa. On 7 August of that year, he performed at the Casa de España of the Spanish Olympic Committee in Paris (France), to express his support for the national delegation at the 2024 Summer Olympics.

On 3 September, 2024, Ana Guerra was confirmed as the person in charge of musically opening the opening gala of the nineteenth edition of the Telecinco reality show Gran Hermano, after seven years without broadcast.

== Discography ==
=== EP ===
- Reflexión (2019)
- Érase una vez (2023)

=== Studio albums ===
- Sus Canciones (Operación Triunfo 2017)
- La Luz del Martes (2021)
- Sin Final (2024)

== Filmography ==
=== Television ===
Year	Program	Channel	Notes
2002	Lluvia de estrellas	Antena 3	Contestant
2002	Veo veo	La 1	Contestant
2017-2018	Operación Triunfo	La 1	Contestant
2018	Tu cara me suena	Antena 3	Join Lola Índigo as Becky G
2018	Rosana y amigos	La 1	Collaborator
2018	Pasapalabra	Telecinco	Guest
2018	Viva la vida	Telecinco	Guest
2018	Aquí la Tierra	La 1	Guest
2018	Lo siguiente	La 1	Guest
2018	El Hormiguero	Antena 3	Guest
2019	Corazón	La 1	Guest
2019	El Hormiguero	Antena 3	Guest
2019	The Resistance	Movistar+	Guest
2020	Zapeando	LaSexta	Guest
2020	Cocina al punto con Peña y Tamara	La 1	Guest
2020	El Hormiguero	Antena 3	Guest
2020	The Resistance	Movistar+	Guest
2020-2021	Campanadas de fin de año	RTVE	Host
2021	El desafío	Antena 3	Special Guest
2021	La noche D	La 1	Guest
2021	El Hormiguero	Antena 3	Guest
2021	The Resistance	Movistar+	Guest
2022	Fuera del mapa	LaSexta	Guest
2022	Martínez y Hermanos	Movistar+	Guest
2023	El desafío	Antena 3	Contestant, winner
2023	Cover night	RTVE	Presenter
2023	That’s My Jam España	Movistar+	Guest
2023	La tarde, aquí y ahora	Canal Sur	Guest
2024	Baila como puedas	RTVE	Contestant, runner-up
2024	Ilustres ignorantes	Movistar+	Guest
2024	Grand Prix	RTVE	Guest
2024	Gran Hermano	Telecinco	Guest
2024	Gala 25 aniversario de Televisión Canaria	Televisión Canaria	Guest
2024	Gala 60 aniversario de TVE Canarias	RTVE Canarias	Presenter
2025	Hay una cosa que te quiero decir	Telecinco	Guest
2025	Tu cara me suena	Telecinco	Contestant
2025	Pasa sin llamar	RTVE	Guest

=== Television series ===
Year	Program	Channel	Role
2018	Fugitiva (voice of the soundtrack)	TVE	Herself
2025	La agencia	Telecinco	Herself

=== Cinema ===
Year	Program	Channel	Role
2020	Historias que nos unen	Disney Channel	Herself
2023	Wish (voice in the Spanish version)	Disney Channel	Herself

== Awards and nominations ==
=== LOS40 Music Awards ===
Year	Ceremony	Category	Work	Result	Ref.
2018	LOS40 Music Awards	Best Spanish Act	Ana Guerra and Aitana	Won	
2018	LOS40 Music Awards	Song of the Year (for "Lo malo")	Herself	Nominated	

Year	Ceremony	Category	Work	Result	Ref.
2019	LOS40 Music Awards	Herself	Artist from 40 to 1	Nominated	

=== Odeon Awards ===
Year	Ceremony	Category	Work	Result	Ref.
2020	Odeon Awards	Artist Odeon Revelation 2020	Herself	Nominated	
2020	Odeon Awards	Female Odeon Artist 2020	Herself	Nominated	

=== Other awards ===
Year	Ceremony	Category	Work	Result	Ref.
2018	Cosmo Awards	Girl Gang	Aitana, Amaia Romero and Miriam Rodríguez	Won	
2018	Radio Disney Music Awards	Brightest Spanish Star	Ana Guerra and Aitana	Won	
2021	Premios Dial	Best Artist of the Year	Herself	Won	
2021	X Premio Nacional El Suplemento	Artist of the Year	Herself	Won	
2022	XVII Galardones La Alcazaba	Female Musical Talent	Herself	Won	
2024	Premios Dial	Premio Cadena Dial 2024	Herself	Won	
2025	Top 50 Music Awards 2025	Best Artist or Group	Herself	Nominated	
