= Tu cara me suena (Spanish TV series) =

Spanish talent television show

- Genre: Reality competition
- Presented by: Manel Fuentes
- Judges: List: Ángel Llácer; Carlos Latre; Carolina Cerezuela; Mónica Naranjo; Marta Sánchez; Shaila Dúrcal; Lolita Flores; Chenoa; Florentino Fernández
- Country of origin: Spain
- Original language: Spanish
- No. of seasons: 13
- No. of episodes: 205 (+10 specials)

Production
- Production companies: Gestmusic; Atresmedia

Original release
- Network: Antena 3
- Release: 28 September 2011 – 17 July 2026

Related
- Tu cara me suena mini; Tu cara no me suena todavía

Tu cara me suena is a Spanish talent television competition where celebrity contestants impersonate singers, that premiered on Antena 3 on 28 September 2011. It is the original version of the Your Face Sounds Familiar franchise that spans many broadcasters around the world adapting its format. The show is hosted by Manel Fuentes.

The series had two spin-offs that only lasted one season each. In 2014, the kid's version Tu cara me suena mini was released, and in 2017 the talent version with anonymous contestants Tu cara no me suena todavía.

== Format ==
The show challenges celebrities to perform as different iconic music artists every week, which are chosen by the show's "Randomiser". Each celebrity becomes transformed into a different singer each week, and performs an iconic song and dance routine by that particular singer. They receive points from the judges based on how closely their performance resembled the original. The celebrity with the most points will be declared the winner of the night and receive a monetary prize for the charity he/she represent. Points accumulate throughout the season and the overall winner will receive a large monetary prize for his charity at the end of the season.

== Seasons ==
Season	Episodes	Originally released		Avg. viewers (millions)	Avg. share
Season	Episodes	First released	Last released	Avg. viewers (millions)	Avg. share
1	10	28 September 2011	30 November 2011	2.915	18.9%
2	16	1 October 2012	11 February 2013	3.355	22.0%
3	19	24 October 2013	27 March 2014	2.809	19.9%
4	17	18 September 2015	29 January 2016	3.215	22.3%
5	18	7 October 2016	3 March 2017	3.288	23.6%
6	20	29 September 2017	2 March 2018	2.198	16.9%
7	15	28 September 2018	8 February 2019	2.610	20.2%
8	17	10 January 2020	8 January 2021	2.547	19.0%
9	15	5 November 2021	4 March 2022	2.378	21.0%
10	16	24 March 2023	21 July 2023	1.794	19.1%
11	14	12 April 2024	19 July 2024	1.673	19.6%
12	14	4 April 2025	11 July 2025	1.743	21.7%
13	14	10 April 2026	17 July 2026	1.428	19.5%

== Participants ==
S.	Winner	Runner-up	Third place	Fourth place	Fifth place	Sixth place	Seventh place	Eighth place	Ninth place
1	Angy Fernández	Santiago Segura	Julio Iglesias Jr.	Sylvia Pantoja	Toñi Salazar	Josema Yuste	Carolina Ferre	Francisco	—N/a
2	Roko	Daniel Diges	Arturo Valls	María del Monte	Santiago Segura	Anna Simon	Ángeles Muñoz	Javier Herrero	—N/a
3	Edurne	Melody	Xuso Jones	Llum Barrera	Florentino Fernández	Los Chunguitos (Note: Brothers Juan Salazar and José Salazar participated together as one single act.)	Santi Rodríguez	José Manuel Soto	Ángela Carrasco
4	Ruth Lorenzo	Edu Soto	Pablo Puyol	Ana Morgade	Adrián Rodríguez	Falete	Silvia Abril	El Sevilla	Vicky Larraz
5	Blas Cantó	Rosa López	Lorena Gómez	Beatriz Luengo	Canco Rodríguez	Esther Arroyo	Juan Muñoz	David Guapo	Yolanda Ramos
6	Miquel Fernández	Lucía Gil	Fran Dieli	Diana Navarro	Raúl Pérez	Pepa Aniorte	Lucía Jiménez	La Terremoto de Alcorcón	David Amor
7	María Villalón	Carlos Baute	Soraya Arnelas	Mimi Doblas	Jordi Coll	Brays Efe	Anabel Alonso	Manu Sánchez	José Corbacho
8	Jorge González	Nerea Rodríguez	Cristina Ramos	Gemeliers (Note: Brothers Daniel Oviedo and Jesús Oviedo participated together as one single act.)	Rocío Madrid	María Isabel	Belinda Washington	Mario Vaquerizo	El Monaguillo
9	Agoney	Nia	María Peláe	Eva Soriano	Rasel	Loles León	Lydia Bosch	David Fernández	Los Morancos (Note: Brothers César Cadaval and Jorge Cadaval participated together as one single act.)
10	Miriam Rodríguez	Andrea Guasch	Merche	Jadel	Alfred García	Anne Igartiburu	Josie	Susi Caramelo	Agustín Jiménez
11	David Bustamante	Raoul Vázquez	Julia Medina	Supremme de Luxe	Conchita	Raquel Sánchez Silva	Juanra Bonet	Miguel Lago	Valeria Ros
12	Melani García	Esperansa Grasia	Mikel Herzog Jr.	Ana Guerra	Gisela	Bertín Osborne	Yenesi	Manu Baqueiro	Goyo Jiménez
13	J Kbello	María Parrado	Martín Savi	Cristina Castaño	Paula Koops	Sole Giménez	Aníbal Gómez	Jesulín de Ubrique	Leonor Lavado

== Judges ==
Judges	Seasons												
Judges	1	2	3	4	5	6	7	8	9	10	11	12	13
Carolina Cerezuela													
Chenoa													
Shaila Dúrcal													
Florentino Fernández													
Lolita Flores													
Carlos Latre													
Ángel Llácer													
Mónica Naranjo													
Marta Sánchez													
