= 99 lugares donde pasar miedo =

- Presented by: Lorenzo Fernández Bueno
- Country of origin: Europe
- Original language: Spanish
- No. of seasons: 1
- No. of episodes: 3

Original release
- Release: 27 April – 10 May 2019

99 lugares donde pasar miedo is a Spanish TV program hosted by Lorenzo Fernández Bueno on Discovery MAX, about mystery and terror stories in Europe. The contestants are Spanish celebrities. It is shot in Czech Republic, Slovakia, Eastern Europe and Scotland.

The first episode aired on 27 April 2019 with Dani Rovira and Tomás García. The second episode aired on 4 May 2019 with Roi Méndez and Ana Guerra, where they visited the Loch Ness, Comlongon Castle and Greyfriars Kirkyard. The third episode was shot in Romania discovering the history of vampirism with the actor Fernando Tejero.
