= Manos Vacías =

Single by Miguel Bosé featuring Rafa Sánchez

from the album Los Chicos No Lloran
- Released: 1990
- Genre: Pop
- Length: 4:43
- Songwriter(s): Emilio Cid Climent; Luis Bolín Domecq
- Producer(s): Miguel Bosé; Enzo Feliciati

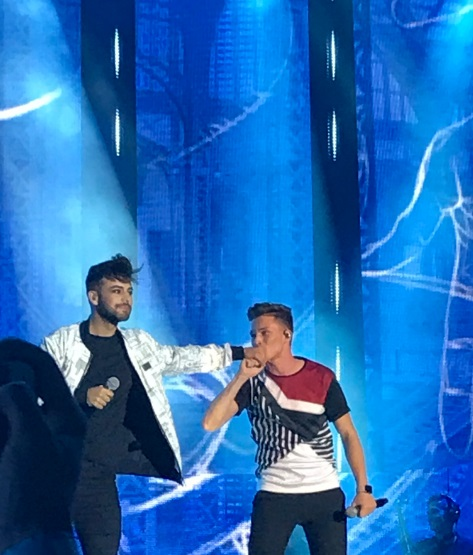
Raoul and Agoney singing "Manos Vacías" in Valencia, June 15, 2018

"Manos Vacías" (English: Empty Handed) is a song written by Emilio Cid Climent and Luis Bolín Domecq. As performed by Spanish singers Miguel Bosé and Rafa Sánchez, it was included on Bosé's studio album Los Chicos No Lloran in 1990 and later included on the special edition of his album Papito. It was also sung by Raoul Vázquez and Agoney Hernández in the talent show Operación Triunfo in 2017.
