= Operación Triunfo series 9 =

Operación Triunfo
- Series 9
- Hosted by: Roberto Leal
- Judges: Mónica Naranjo; Joe Pérez-Orive; Manuel Martos
- Winner: Amaia Romero
- Runner-up: Aitana Ocaña
- Location: Parc Audiovisual de Catalunya, Terrassa, Barcelona

Release
- Original network: La 1
- Original release: 23 October 2017 – 5 February 2018

Series chronology
- ← Previous; Series 8 Next → Series 10

The ninth series of Operación Triunfo, also known as Operación Triunfo 2017, aired on La 1 from 23 October 2017 to 5 February 2018, presented by Roberto Leal. It was the first season broadcast by Radiotelevisión Española (RTVE), which aired the first three seasons, in thirteen years. Seasons 4–8 of Operación Triunfo aired on Telecinco, which discontinued the series in 2011 due to declining ratings. RTVE approved to revive the series with a budget of 10.2 million euros.

In addition to the Galas or weekly live shows on La 1, daily recap shows aired on Clan, and the side show El Chat aired on La 1 after each weekly Gala, hosted by Noemí Galera. The activities of the contestants at "The Academy" or La Academia were streamed live via YouTube and the subscription platform Sky España.

Amaia Romero was announced the winner on 5 February 2018. Aitana Ocaña came second. Miriam Rodríguez ranked third, Alfred García fourth and fifth place went to Ana Guerra.

On 4 December 2017, during sixth week's live show or "Gala 6", it was announced that the series would serve as the platform to select the Spanish entrant at the Eurovision Song Contest 2018. On 20 December 2017, TVE announced that the five contestants that would succeed in advancing to the series' final would also be the five candidates to represent Spain at Eurovision. The live show that selected the Spanish entrant and song for Eurovision took place on 29 January 2018. Alfred García and Amaia Romero were selected with the song "Tu canción".

The ninth series turned into a media success in Spain, which was compared to the success of the original series of Operación Triunfo sixteen years before. Some of the contestants from this series such as Amaia Romero, Alfred García, Aitana, Miriam Rodríguez, Ana Guerra, Cepeda, Agoney, Mimi Doblas, Roi Méndez, Raoul Vázquez or Mireya Bravo went on to launch solo projects.

== Headmaster, judges and presenter ==
On 18 July 2017, Noemí Galera, who had appeared as a member of the jury panel on previous seasons, was announced as the new "headmaster" of the Academy. On 28 August 2017, it was revealed that the jury panel would consist of three regular judges and a fourth guest judge. The three regular judges were singer, songwriter and producer Mónica Naranjo, marketing director Joe Pérez-Orive and music executive and producer Manuel Martos, who were accompanied every week by a guest panelist from the music industry. On 30 August 2017, it was announced that Roberto Leal would debut as host of Operación Triunfo.

== Auditions ==
Open casting auditions began on 14 June 2017 in Barcelona and concluded on 18 July 2017 in Madrid. The minimum age to audition was 18.

Summary of open auditions
Location	Date	Venue
Barcelona	14 June 2017	Palau Sant Jordi
Las Palmas	21 June 2017	Auditorio Alfredo Kraus
Palma	26 June 2017	Auditorium de Palma de Mallorca
Valencia	28 June 2017	City of Arts and Sciences
Santiago de Compostela	3 July 2017	Palacio de Congresos e Exposicións de Galicia
Bilbao	5 July 2017	Bilbao Exhibition Centre
Granada	10 July 2017	Palacio de Congresos de Granada
Seville	13 July 2017	Fibes
Madrid	18 July 2017	ETS de Ingeniería Agronómica, Alimentaria y de Biosistemas

After the open auditions, 81 candidates were called for a closed-door audition on 20 and 21 September 2017. 18 candidates advanced to the introduction live show or Gala 0, where the 16 official contestants who entered the Academy were selected.

== Contestants ==
The 18 contestants that would appear on the introduction live show or Gala 0 were announced on 20 October 2017.

Contestant	Age	Residence	Episode of eviction	Place finished
Amaia	18	Pamplona	Final Gala	Winner
Aitana	18	Sant Climent de Llobregat	Final Gala	Runner-up
Miriam	21	Pontedeume	Final Gala	3rd
Alfred	20	El Prat de Llobregat	Final Gala	4th
Ana Guerra	23	San Cristóbal de La Laguna	Final Gala	5th
Agoney	21	Adeje	Gala 12	6th
Roi	24	Santiago de Compostela	Gala 11	7th
Nerea	18	Gavà	Gala 10	8th
Cepeda	28	Ourense	Gala 9	9th
Raoul	20	Montgat	Gala 8	10th
Mireya	20	Alhaurín de la Torre	Gala 7	11th
Ricky	31	Palma	Gala 6	12th
Marina	19	Montequinto (Dos Hermanas)	Gala 5	13th
Thalía	18	Malpartida de Plasencia	Gala 4	14th
Juan Antonio	23	Bilbao	Gala 3	15th
Mimi	25	Huétor-Tájar	Gala 2	16th
João	21	Madrid	Gala 0	Not selected
Mario	21	Madrid	Gala 0	Not selected

== Galas ==
The Galas or live shows began on 23 October 2017. In the introduction live show or Gala 0, 18 candidates were presented to enter the "Academy." Each contestant performed a cover version of a popular song of their choice, and two of the candidates were eliminated. For the regular galas, the contestants are assigned a popular song to perform in a duet or solo. The audience votes for their favourite performer, and the contestant with the most votes is exempt for nominations. The jury panel comments on the performances and nominates four contestants for eviction. The Academy's staff meeting saves one of the nominees, and the safe contestants save another of the nominees. The two remaining nominees prepare the performance of a song of their choice each for next week's live show, where one of the contestants will be saved by the audience via televote, sms and app voting. Each gala features a guest judge and guest performers.

=== Results summary ===
Colour key

–	The contestant was the weekly public's favourite and was exempt for nominations.
–	The contestant was up for the nomination but was saved by the teachers.
–	The contestant was up for the nomination but was saved by the contestants.
–	The contestant was nominated to leave the academy.
–	The contestant was up for the eviction but was immediately saved by the public votes.

	Gala 0	Gala 1	Gala 2	Gala 3	Gala 4	Gala 5	Gala 6	Gala 7	Gala 8	Gala 9	Gala 10	Gala 11	Gala 12	Final
Amaia	Saved	Saved	Favourite	Favourite	Saved	Saved	Favourite	Saved	Saved	Saved	Saved	Saved; Mark: 10	Finalist	Winner
Aitana	Saved	Favourite	Saved	Saved	Saved	Saved	Saved	Saved	Saved	Favourite	Saved	Saved; Mark: 8.5	Finalist	Runner-up
Miriam	Saved	Saved	Saved	Saved	Saved	Saved	Saved	Saved	Saved	Saved	Saved	Saved; Mark: 9	Finalist	3rd Place
Alfred	Saved	Saved	Saved	Saved	Favourite	Favourite	Saved	Saved	Saved	Saved	Saved	Saved; Mark: 8.75	Finalist	4th Place
Ana	Saved	Saved	Saved	Saved	Saved	Saved	Saved	Saved	Favourite	Saved	Nominated	Nominated; Mark: 7.25	Finalist	5th Place
Agoney	Saved	Saved	Saved	Saved	Saved	Saved	Saved	Saved	Saved	Nominated	Saved	Nominated; Mark: 8.25	Eliminated	
Roi	Saved	Saved	Nominated	Saved	Saved	Saved	Saved	Favourite	Nominated	Saved	Nominated	Eliminated		
Nerea	Saved	Saved	Saved	Saved	Saved	Saved	Saved	Saved	Saved	Nominated	Eliminated			
Cepeda	Saved	Saved	Saved	Nominated	Saved	Nominated	Nominated	Nominated	Nominated	Eliminated				
Raoul	Saved	Saved	Saved	Saved	Saved	Saved	Saved	Nominated	Eliminated					
Mireya	Saved	Saved	Saved	Saved	Nominated	Saved	Nominated	Eliminated						
Ricky	Saved	Nominated	Saved	Saved	Saved	Nominated	Eliminated							
Marina	Saved	Saved	Saved	Saved	Nominated	Eliminated								
Thalía	Saved	Saved	Saved	Nominated	Eliminated									
Juan Antonio	Saved	Saved	Nominated	Eliminated										
Mimi	Saved	Nominated	Eliminated											
João	Eliminated													
Mario	Eliminated													
Up for elimination	Amaia; Joao; Mario; Mimi; Thalía	Ana; Mimi; Ricky; Roi	Aitana; Ana; Juan Antonio; Roi	Cepeda; Marina; Nerea; Thalía	Marina; Mireya; Miriam; Ricky	Agoney; Cepeda; Miriam; Ricky	Cepeda; Mireya; Miriam; Roi	Alfred; Ana; Cepeda; Raoul	Agoney; Alfred; Cepeda; Roi	Agoney; Alfred; Miriam; Nerea	Aitana; Alfred; Ana; Roi	Aitana; Agoney; Ana	None	Amaia; 46% to win (out of 3)
Saved by the teachers	Thalía; Amaia	Ana	Aitana	Nerea	Miriam	Agoney	Roi	Alfred	Agoney	Miriam	Alfred	Aitana	None	Amaia; 46% to win (out of 3)
Saved by the contestants	None	Roi; 7 of 13 votes to save	Ana; 7 of 12 votes to save	Marina; 6 of 11 votes to save	Ricky; 7 of 10 votes to save	Miriam; 5 of 9 votes to save	Miriam; 4 of 8 votes to save	Ana; 3* of 7 votes to save	Alfred; 4 of 6 votes to save	Alfred; 4 of 5 votes to save	Aitana; 2 of 4 votes to save	None	None	Aitana; 42% to win (out of 3)
Saved by public vote	Mimi; 45% to save	None	Ricky; 53% to save	Roi; 91% to save	Cepeda; 69% to save	Mireya; 63% to save	Cepeda; 53% to save	Cepeda; 53% to save	Cepeda; 54% to save	Roi; 73% to save	Agoney; 53% to save	Ana; 51% to save	Ana; 50.3% to save	Miriam; 12% to win (out of 3)
Evicted	Joao; 39% to save	None	Mimi; 47% to save	Juan Antonio; 9% to save	Thalía; 31% to save	Marina; 37% to save	Ricky; 47% to save	Mireya; 47% to save	Raoul; 46% to save	Cepeda; 27% to save	Nerea; 47% to save	Roi; 49% to save	Agoney; 49.7% to save	Alfred; 8% to win (out of 5)
Evicted	Mario; 16% to save	None	Mimi; 47% to save	Juan Antonio; 9% to save	Thalía; 31% to save	Marina; 37% to save	Ricky; 47% to save	Mireya; 47% to save	Raoul; 46% to save	Cepeda; 27% to save	Nerea; 47% to save	Roi; 49% to save	Agoney; 49.7% to save	Ana; 7% to win (out of 5)

=== Gala 0 ===
- Musical guests:
  - Mónica Naranjo ("Solo se vive una vez")
  - Rosa López ("Ahora sé quién soy")

Gala 0 – 23 October 2017
R/O	Contestant	Song	Result
1	Aitana	"Bang Bang"	Saved by the jury
2	Mario	"Sofia"	Proposed by the jury Evicted by the public
3	Miriam	"No te pude retener"	Saved by the jury
4	Agoney	"Purple Rain"	Saved by the jury
5	Alfred	"Georgia on My Mind"	Saved by the jury
6	Mimi	"Don't Cha"	Proposed by the jury Saved by the public
7	Juan Antonio	"Pasos de cero"	Saved by the jury
8	Thalía	"Break Free"	Proposed by the jury Saved by the teachers
9	Cepeda	"Tú me obligaste"	Saved by the jury
10	Marina	"Girl on Fire"	Saved by the jury
11	Ricky	"Adventure of a Lifetime"	Saved by the jury
12	Mireya	"Hoy"	Saved by the jury
13	Raoul	"Catch & Release"	Saved by the jury
14	João	"Stand by Me"	Proposed by the jury Evicted by the public
15	Nerea	"Qué hay más allá"	Saved by the jury
16	Amaia	"Starman"	Proposed by the jury Saved by the teachers
17	Ana Guerra	"Cómo te atreves"	Saved by the jury
18	Roi	"Don't Worry"	Saved by the jury

=== Gala 1 ===
- Musical guest: Becky G ("Mayores")
- Guest judge: David Bustamante

Gala 1 – 30 October 2017
R/O	Contestant	Song	Result
1	Miriam	"Runnin' (Lose It All)"	Saved by the jury
1	Agoney	"Runnin' (Lose It All)"	Saved by the jury
2	Cepeda	"No puedo vivir sin ti"	Saved by the jury
2	Aitana	"No puedo vivir sin ti"	Public's favourite
3	Roi	"Tu enemigo"	Proposed by the jury Saved by the contestants
3	Ricky	"Tu enemigo"	Proposed by the jury Nominated
4	Raoul	"Cake by the Ocean"	Saved by the jury
4	Thalía	"Cake by the Ocean"	Saved by the jury
5	Nerea	"Las cuatro y diez"	Saved by the jury
5	Amaia	"Las cuatro y diez"	Saved by the jury
6	Ana Guerra	"Don't You Worry 'bout a Thing"	Proposed by the jury Saved by the teachers
6	Mimi	"Don't You Worry 'bout a Thing"	Proposed by the jury Nominated
7	Mireya	"¡Corre!"	Saved by the jury
7	Juan Antonio	"¡Corre!"	Saved by the jury
8	Marina	"Don't Dream It's Over"	Saved by the jury
8	Alfred	"Don't Dream It's Over"	Saved by the jury

=== Gala 2 ===
- Group performance: "Te quiero"
- Musical guest: Morat ("Yo contigo, tú conmigo") (with Cepeda)
- Guest judge: Wally López

Gala 2 – 6 November 2017
R/O	Contestant	Song	Result
Up for eviction
1	Mimi	"A-Yo"	Evicted by the public
2	Ricky	"One Song Glory"	Saved by the public Saved by the jury
Regular performances
3	Ana Guerra	"Todas las flores"	Proposed by the jury Saved by the contestants
3	Amaia	"Todas las flores"	Public's favourite
4	Miriam	"Malibu"	Saved by the jury
4	Roi	"Malibu"	Proposed by the jury Nominated
5	Mireya	"Sentir"	Saved by the jury
5	Marina	"Sentir"	Saved by the jury
6	Aitana	"Can't Stop the Feeling!"	Proposed by the jury Saved by the teachers
6	Agoney	"Can't Stop the Feeling!"	Saved by the jury
7	Nerea	"Will You Love Me Tomorrow"	Saved by the jury
7	Thalía	"Will You Love Me Tomorrow"	Saved by the jury
8	Cepeda	"Reggaetón Lento (Bailemos)"	Saved by the jury
8	Juan Antonio	"Reggaetón Lento (Bailemos)"	Proposed by the jury Nominated
9	Alfred	"Everytime You Go Away"	Saved by the jury
9	Raoul	"Everytime You Go Away"	Saved by the jury

=== Gala 3 ===
- Group performance: "I'm Still Standing"
- Musical guests:
  - Blas Cantó ("In Your Bed")
  - India Martínez ("Aguasanta")
- Guest judge: Julia Gómez Cora

Gala 3 – 13 November 2017
R/O	Contestant	Song	Result
Up for eviction
1	Juan Antonio	"A Puro Dolor"	Evicted by the public
2	Roi	"When We Were Young"	Saved by the public Saved by the jury
Regular performances
3	Mireya	"La quiero a morir"	Saved by the jury
3	Raoul	"La quiero a morir"	Saved by the jury
4	Aitana	"Issues"	Saved by the jury
5	Agoney	"Mientes"	Saved by the jury
5	Ricky	"Mientes"	Saved by the jury
6	Nerea	"Cuídate"	Proposed by the jury Saved by the teachers
6	Ana Guerra	"Cuídate"	Saved by the jury
7	Thalía	"Euphoria"	Proposed by the jury Nominated
7	Miriam	"Euphoria"	Saved by the jury
8	Marina	"Complicidad"	Proposed by the jury Saved by the contestants
8	Cepeda	"Complicidad"	Proposed by the jury Nominated
9	Amaia	"City of Stars"	Public's favourite
9	Alfred	"City of Stars"	Saved by the jury

=== Gala 4 ===
- Group performance: "Eres tú"
- Musical guests:
  - Ruth Lorenzo ("Good Girls Don't Lie")
  - Maldita Nerea ("Cuando todas las historias se acaban") (with Ana Guerra)
- Guest judge: Alejandro Parreño

Gala 4 – 20 November 2017
R/O	Contestant	Song	Result
Up for eviction
1	Cepeda	"Dancing On My Own"	Saved by the public Saved by the jury
2	Thalía	"Cenizas"	Evicted by the public
Regular performances
3	Aitana	"Con las ganas"	Saved by the jury
3	Amaia	"Con las ganas"	Saved by the jury
4	Agoney	"Symphony"	Saved by the jury
4	Nerea	"Symphony"	Saved by the jury
5	Miriam	"La media vuelta"	Proposed by the jury Saved by the teachers
6	Raoul	"Dancing in the Moonlight"	Saved by the jury
6	Marina	"Dancing in the Moonlight"	Proposed by the jury Nominated
7	Ricky	"Madre Tierra"	Proposed by the jury Saved by the contestants
7	Mireya	"Madre Tierra"	Proposed by the jury Nominated
8	Roi	"There's Nothing Holdin' Me Back"	Saved by the jury
8	Ana Guerra	"There's Nothing Holdin' Me Back"	Saved by the jury
9	Alfred	"Amar pelos dois"	Public's favourite

=== Gala 5 ===
- Group performance: "La revolución sexual"
- Musical guests:
  - Romeo Santos ("Imitadora")
  - Beatriz Luengo ("Más que suerte") (with Agoney)
- Guest judge: Tony Aguilar

Gala 5 – 27 November 2017
R/O	Contestant	Song	Result
Up for eviction
1	Marina	"The Voice Within"	Evicted by the public
2	Mireya	"Cuando nadie me ve"	Saved by the public Saved by the jury
Regular performances
3	Alfred	"El mismo sol"	Public's favourite
3	Aitana	"El mismo sol"	Saved by the jury
4	Miriam	"Estoy hecho de pedacitos de ti"	Proposed by the jury Saved by the contestants
4	Cepeda	"Estoy hecho de pedacitos de ti"	Proposed by the jury Nominated
5	Agoney	"Rise like a Phoenix"	Proposed by the jury Saved by the teachers
6	Nerea	"(I've Had) The Time of My Life"	Saved by the jury
6	Ricky	"(I've Had) The Time of My Life"	Proposed by the jury Nominated
7	Ana Guerra	"La Bikina"	Saved by the jury
8	Amaia	"Shape of You"	Saved by the jury
8	Roi	"Shape of You"	Saved by the jury
9	Raoul	"Million Reasons"	Saved by the jury

=== Gala 6 ===
- Group performance: "Ain't No Mountain High Enough"
- Musical guests:
  - Taburete ("Sirenas")
  - Pastora Soler ("La tormenta")
- Guest judge: David Bustamante

Gala 6 – 4 December 2017
R/O	Contestant	Song	Result
Up for eviction
1	Ricky	"Let Me Entertain You"	Evicted by the public
2	Cepeda	"Quién"	Saved by the public Proposed by the jury Nominated
Regular performances
3	Aitana	"Let Me Love You"	Saved by the jury
3	Raoul	"Let Me Love You"	Saved by the jury
4	Nerea	"Quédate conmigo"	Saved by the jury
5	Alfred	"The Lady Is a Tramp"	Saved by the jury
5	Agoney	"The Lady Is a Tramp"	Saved by the jury
6	Miriam	"Que te quería"	Proposed by the jury Saved by the contestants
7	Ana Guerra	"Comiéndote a besos"	Saved by the jury
7	Mireya	"Comiéndote a besos"	Proposed by the jury Nominated
8	Roi	"La llamada"	Proposed by the jury Saved by the teachers
9	Amaia	"So What"	Public's favourite

=== Gala 7 ===
- Group performance: "¿A quién le importa?"
- Musical guests:
  - Lorena Gómez ("Vulnerable a ti")
  - Vanesa Martín ("Hábito de ti")
- Guest judge: Sole Giménez

Gala 7 – 11 December 2017
R/O	Contestant	Song	Result
Up for eviction
1	Cepeda	"Mi héroe"	Saved by the public Proposed by the jury Nominated
2	Mireya	"Ni un paso atrás"	Evicted by the public
Regular performances
3	Ana Guerra	"Lágrimas negras"	Proposed by the jury Saved by the contestants
4	Roi	"OK"	Public's favourite
5	Nerea	"Cómo hablar"	Saved by the jury
5	Miriam	"Cómo hablar"	Saved by the jury
6	Aitana	"New Rules"	Saved by the jury
7	Amaia	"Across the Universe"	Saved by the jury
8	Agoney	"Manos vacías"	Saved by the jury
8	Raoul	"Manos vacías"	Proposed by the jury Nominated
9	Alfred	"Rock with You"	Proposed by the jury Saved by the teachers

=== Gala 8 ===
- Group performance: "Shake It Off"
- Musical guests:
  - Sergio Dalma ("Este amor no se toca")
  - La Oreja de Van Gogh ("Estoy contigo")
- Guest judge: Javier Llano

Gala 8 – 18 December 2017
R/O	Contestant	Song	Result
Up for eviction
1	Cepeda	"Vencer al amor"	Saved by the public Proposed by the jury Nominated
2	Raoul	"Every Breath You Take"	Evicted by the public
Regular performances
3	Ana Guerra	"Sax"	Public's favourite
4	Alfred	"Vete de mí"	Proposed by the jury Saved by the contestants
5	Aitana	"Chasing Pavements"	Saved by the jury
6	Nerea	"Superstar"	Saved by the jury
7	Amaia	"Me conformo"	Saved by the jury
8	Miriam	"I Wanna Dance with Somebody (Who Loves Me)"	Saved by the jury
9	Agoney	"Je suis venu te dire que je m'en vais"	Proposed by the jury Saved by the teachers
10	Roi	"Versace on the Floor"	Proposed by the jury Nominated

=== Gala 9 ===
- Group performance: "Hoy puede ser un gran día"
- Musical guest: Carlos Baute ("Vamo' a la calle")
- Guest judge: Wally López

Gala 9 – 2 January 2018
R/O	Contestant	Song	Result
Up for eviction
1	Roi	"When I Was Your Man"	Saved by the public Saved by the jury
2	Cepeda	"Say You Won't Let Go"	Evicted by the public
Regular performances
3	Aitana	"¡Chas! y aparezco a tu lado"	Public's favourite
4	Agoney	"Without You"	Proposed by the jury Nominated
5	Alfred	"Insurrección"	Proposed by the jury Saved by the contestants
6	Nerea	"Out Here on My Own"	Proposed by the jury Nominated
7	Miriam	"Dramas y comedias"	Proposed by the jury Saved by the teachers
8	Amaia	"Shake It Out"	Saved by the jury
9	Ana Guerra	"Cabaret"	Saved by the jury

=== Gala 10 ===
From this week, voting for the favourite of the audience was put on hold for the final stretch of the series, and no contestant was exempt for nominations.

- Group performance: "Resistiré"
- Musical guest: Pablo López ("El patio")
- Guest judge: Carlos Jean

Gala 10 – 8 January 2018
R/O	Contestant	Solo Song	R/O	Trio Song	Result
Up for eviction
1	Agoney	"Somebody to Love"	—N/a		Saved by the public Saved by the jury
2	Nerea	"Listen"	—N/a		Evicted by the public
Regular performances
4	Aitana	"Cheap Thrills"	7	"Solo si es contigo"	Proposed by the jury Saved by the contestants
5	Ana Guerra	"La negra tiene tumbao"	7	"Solo si es contigo"	Proposed by the jury Nominated
10	Alfred	"Get It Together"	7	"Solo si es contigo"	Proposed by the jury Saved by the teachers
6	Roi	"Demons"	3	"Robarte un beso"	Proposed by the jury Nominated
8	Miriam	"Quisiera ser"	3	"Robarte un beso"	Saved by the jury
9	Amaia	"Soñar contigo"	3	"Robarte un beso"	Saved by the jury

=== Gala 11 ===
This episode determined the first four contestants that qualified for the final. Each of the four members of the jury panel gave marks to the contestants (from 5 to 10). The three contestants with the highest score were saved. The Academy's staff saved a fourth contestant. The two remaining contestants were up for elimination.

- Group performance: "País Tropical"
- Musical guest: Abraham Mateo ("Loco Enamorado")
- Guest judge: Julia Gómez Cora

Gala 11 – 15 January 2018
R/O	Contestant	Solo Song	R/O	Duo/Trio Song	Result
Up for eviction
1	Ana Guerra	"Por debajo de la mesa"	—N/a		Saved by the public Nominated
2	Roi	"Heaven"	—N/a		Evicted by the public
Regular performances
4	Alfred	"Sign of the Times"	6	"Cuando duermes"	Finalist
8	Miriam	"What About Us"	6	"Cuando duermes"	Finalist
5	Aitana	"Procuro olvidarte"	3	"Lucha de gigantes"	Saved by the teachers Finalist
7	Agoney	"Eloise"	3	"Lucha de gigantes"	Nominated
9	Amaia	"Love on the Brain"	3	"Lucha de gigantes"	Finalist

Detailed Jury Marks
Contestant	M. Martos	M. Naranjo	J. Pérez-Orive	J. Gómez Cora	Total
Ana Guerra	8	7	8	6	29
Alfred	9	8	10	8	35
Miriam	8	9	10	9	36
Aitana	9	8	8	9	34
Agoney	8	9	7	9	33
Amaia	10	10	10	10	40

=== Gala 12 ===
- Group performance: "Cuéntame"
- Musical guests:
  - Rozalén ("La puerta violeta")
  - Sebastián Yatra ("Sutra")
- Guest judge: Javier Llano

Gala 12 – 22 January 2018
R/O	Contestant	Solo Song	R/O	Duo Song	Result
Up for eviction
1	Ana Guerra	"Havana"	—N/a		Saved by the public Finalist
2	Agoney	"Where Have You Been"	—N/a		Evicted by the public
Regular performances
3	Alfred	"Maldita dulzura"	8	"Todo mi amor eres tú"	Finalists
6	Amaia	"Te recuerdo Amanda"	8	"Todo mi amor eres tú"	Finalists
5	Miriam	"Recuérdame"	4	"Valerie"	Finalists
7	Aitana	"Instruction"	4	"Valerie"	Finalists

=== Final Gala ===
In the final, the winner of the series was decided by public vote. Each finalist performed a popular song of their choice, and after that, the first round of voting ended. The two finalists with the fewest votes were eliminated. A second round of voting began to determine the winner of the series, and the three remaining finalists performed the song they had sung on "Gala 0".

- Group performances:
  - "Mi gran noche" (with Raphael)
  - "Camina" (all sixteen contestants)
- Musical guests:
  - Raphael ("Mi gran noche")
  - Pablo Alborán ("Prometo")
  - David Bisbal ("Mi princesa")
- Guest judge: Rosa López

Final Gala – 5 February 2018
R/O	Contestant	Final Song	R/O	Gala 0 Song	Result
1	Alfred	"Don't Stop the Music"	—N/a		4th Place
2	Ana Guerra	"Volver"	—N/a		5th Place
3	Aitana	"Chandelier"	6	"Bang Bang"	Runner-Up
4	Amaia	"Miedo"	7	"Starman"	Winner
5	Miriam	"Invisible"	8	"No te pude retener"	3rd Place

== Specials ==
=== Christmas Gala ===
On 25 December 2017 a Christmas special aired on La 1, where the sixteen official contestants of the series performed together with some of the contestants from the original series of Operación Triunfo.

- Group performances:
  - "Mi música es tu voz"
  - "Camina"

Christmas Gala – 25 December 2017
R/O	Contestant	Series 1 partner	Song
1	Ana Guerra	Gisela; Verónica Romero	"Lady Marmalade"
1	Mimi	Gisela; Verónica Romero	"Lady Marmalade"
2	Alfred	Naím Thomas	"Adoro"
3	Aitana	Natalia	"Walking on Sunshine"
4	Nerea	Àlex Casademunt	"Vivo por ella"
5	Raoul	Alejandro Parreño	"Don't Let the Sun Go Down on Me"
6	Cepeda	Manu Tenorio	"Lucía"
7	Agoney	Gisela	"Somebody Else's Guy"
8	Juan Antonio	Àlex Casademunt; Javián	"Corazón espinado"
8	Ricky	Àlex Casademunt; Javián	"Corazón espinado"
9	Mireya	Nuria Fergó	"Noches de bohemia"
10	Roi	Verónica Romero	"I Finally Found Someone"
11	Marina	Geno Machado; Natalia	"Déjame soñar"
11	Thalía	Geno Machado; Natalia	"Déjame soñar"
12	Miriam	Javián	"Te quiero, te quiero"
13	Amaia	Rosa López	"Gracias por la música"

=== Eurovision Gala ===
The five finalists performed original songs (written by music publishers and internally chosen by the Spanish broadcaster) with the goal of representing Spain at the Eurovision Song Contest 2018. Each finalist was allocated a song to be performed solo, three songs were allocated to duet combinations which included the sixth-placed contestant Agoney, and "Camina" was a candidate song performed by the five finalists. The Spanish entry for Eurovision was decided by public vote. After a first round of voting, the three entries with the most votes from the public advanced to a second round of voting. In the second round, the Spanish entry was selected by public vote.

- Group performance:
  - "La, la, la" (Cepeda, Juan Antonio, Mimi, Mireya and Thalía)
  - "Vivo cantando" (Marina, Nerea, Ricky, Raoul and Roi)
- Musical guests:
  - Luísa Sobral ("Cupido")
  - Conchita Wurst ("Rise like a Phoenix")
  - J Balvin ("Machika" and "Mi gente")
- Guest judges (along with Manuel Martos):
  - Víctor Escudero
  - Luísa Sobral
  - Julia Varela

Eurovision Gala – 29 January 2018
R/O	Contestant	Song	Result	
R/O	Contestant	Song	Round One	Round Two
1	Aitana, Alfred, Amaia, Ana Guerra, and Miriam	"Camina"	Eliminated (1%)	
2	Aitana	"Arde"	Advanced	2nd (31%)
3	Agoney & Miriam	"Magia"	Eliminated (7%)	
4	Alfred	"Que nos sigan las luces"	Eliminated (3%)	
5	Aitana and Ana Guerra	"Lo malo"	Advanced	3rd (26%)
6	Amaia	"Al cantar"	Eliminated (4%)	
7	Miriam	"Lejos de tu piel"	Eliminated (8%)	
8	Ana Guerra	"El remedio"	Eliminated (5%)	
9	Alfred and Amaia	"Tu canción"	Advanced	1st (43%)

=== Special Gala: OT, la fiesta ===
An extra special live show aired on 13 February 2018, with the audience's favourite performances of the five finalists, three group performances, and previously unaired moments of the contestants.

OT, la fiesta – 13 February 2018
R/O	Song	Contestant
1	"Camina"	All
2	"Runnin' (Lose It All)"	Miriam
2	"Runnin' (Lose It All)"	Agoney
3	"Issues"	Aitana
4	"¿A quién le importa?"	All
5	"Don't Dream It's Over"	Alfred
5	"Don't Dream It's Over"	Marina
6	"What About Us"	Miriam
7	"Don't You Worry 'bout a Thing"	Ana Guerra
7	"Don't You Worry 'bout a Thing"	Mimi
8	"Shake It Out"	Amaia
9	"Lo malo"	Aitana
9	"Lo malo"	Ana Guerra
10	"Shape of You"	Amaia
10	"Shape of You"	Roi
11	"No puedo vivir sin ti"	Aitana
11	"No puedo vivir sin ti"	Cepeda
12	"La revolución sexual"	All
13	"Tu canción"	Alfred
13	"Tu canción"	Amaia
14	"City of Stars"	Alfred
14	"City of Stars"	Amaia

== Tour ==
Following the finale, all 16 contestants reunited for a tour across arenas and stadiums in Spain, performing live to sell out audiences. A DVD+CD of the first concert of the tour in Barcelona was released in June 2018.

Dates of the Operación Triunfo 2017 tour
Date	Venue	Attendance
3 March 2018	Palau Sant Jordi, Barcelona	17,000
16 March 2018	Palacio Vistalegre, Madrid	15,000
29 May 2018	Gran Canaria Arena's Parking Lot, Las Palmas	6,000
30 May 2018	Parque Marítimo Palmetum, Santa Cruz	4,000
1 June 2018	Auditorio Municipal, Málaga	12,000
2 June 2018	La Cartuja Stadium, Seville	20,000
8 June 2018	Coliseum da Coruña, A Coruña	11,000
9 June 2018	Antigua Hípica Militar, Valladolid	12,000
15 June 2018	Auditorio Marina Sur, Valencia	18,000
20 June 2018	Poliesportiu Municipal Mateu Cañellas, Inca	11,000
23 June 2018	Plaza de Toros, Pamplona	17,000
24 June 2018	Bizkaia Arena, Bilbao	14,000
29 June 2018	Santiago Bernabéu Stadium, Madrid	60,000
6 July 2018	Estadio Nueva Condomina, Murcia	14,000
29 July 2018 (Note: The 29 July 2018 in Gijón was a part of the Gijón Life festival.)	Parque de los Hermanos Castro, Gijón	10,000
4 August 2018	Guillermo Amor Stadium, Benidorm	8,000
15 August 2018 (Note: The 15 August 2018 in Pineda de Mar was a part of the Festival ARTS d'Estiu.)	Complejo Deportivo Can Xaubet, Pineda de Mar	1,200
25 August 2018	Recinto de Conciertos de Verano, Almería	7,500
27 December 2018	Palau Sant Jordi, Barcelona	36,000
28 December 2018	Palau Sant Jordi, Barcelona	36,000

== Ratings ==
Operación Triunfo 2017 consolidated viewership and adjusted position Colour key: – Highest rating during the season (nominal) – Lowest rating during the season (nominal)
Episode	Original airdate	Timeslot	Viewers (millions)	Share	Night Rank	Source
"Gala 0"	23 October 2017	Monday 10:15 pm	2.56	19.0%	#1	
"Gala 1"	30 October 2017	Monday 10:35 pm	2.05	15.9%	#2	
"Gala 2"	6 November 2017	Monday 10:35 pm	1.86	15.5%	#2	
"Gala 3"	13 November 2017	Monday 10:35 pm	1.94	15.9%	#2	
"Gala 4"	20 November 2017	Monday 10:35 pm	2.04	17.2%	#2	
"Gala 5"	27 November 2017	Monday 10:35 pm	2.03	17.6%	#2	
"Gala 6"	4 December 2017	Monday 10:35 pm	2.14	17.8%	#2	
"Gala 7"	11 December 2017	Monday 10:35 pm	2.31	18.5%	#2	
"Gala 8"	18 December 2017	Monday 10:35 pm	2.37	18.8%	#2	
"Christmas Gala"	25 December 2017	Monday 10:15 pm	2.33	14.7%	#1	
"Gala 9"	2 January 2018	Tuesday 10:35 pm	2.57	18.3%	#1	
"Gala 10"	8 January 2018	Monday 10:35 pm	2.61	19.5%	#1	
"Gala 11"	15 January 2018	Monday 10:35 pm	2.51	19.5%	#1	
"Gala 12"	22 January 2018	Monday 10:35 pm	2.76	21.7%	#1	
"Eurovision Gala"	29 January 2018	Monday 10:35 pm	3.09	23.6%	#1	
"Final Gala"	5 February 2018	Monday 10:35 pm	3.93	30.8%	#1	
"Special Gala"	13 February 2018	Tuesday 10:35 pm	2.25	16.7%	#3	
