= Belinda Washington =

Actress and TV presenter

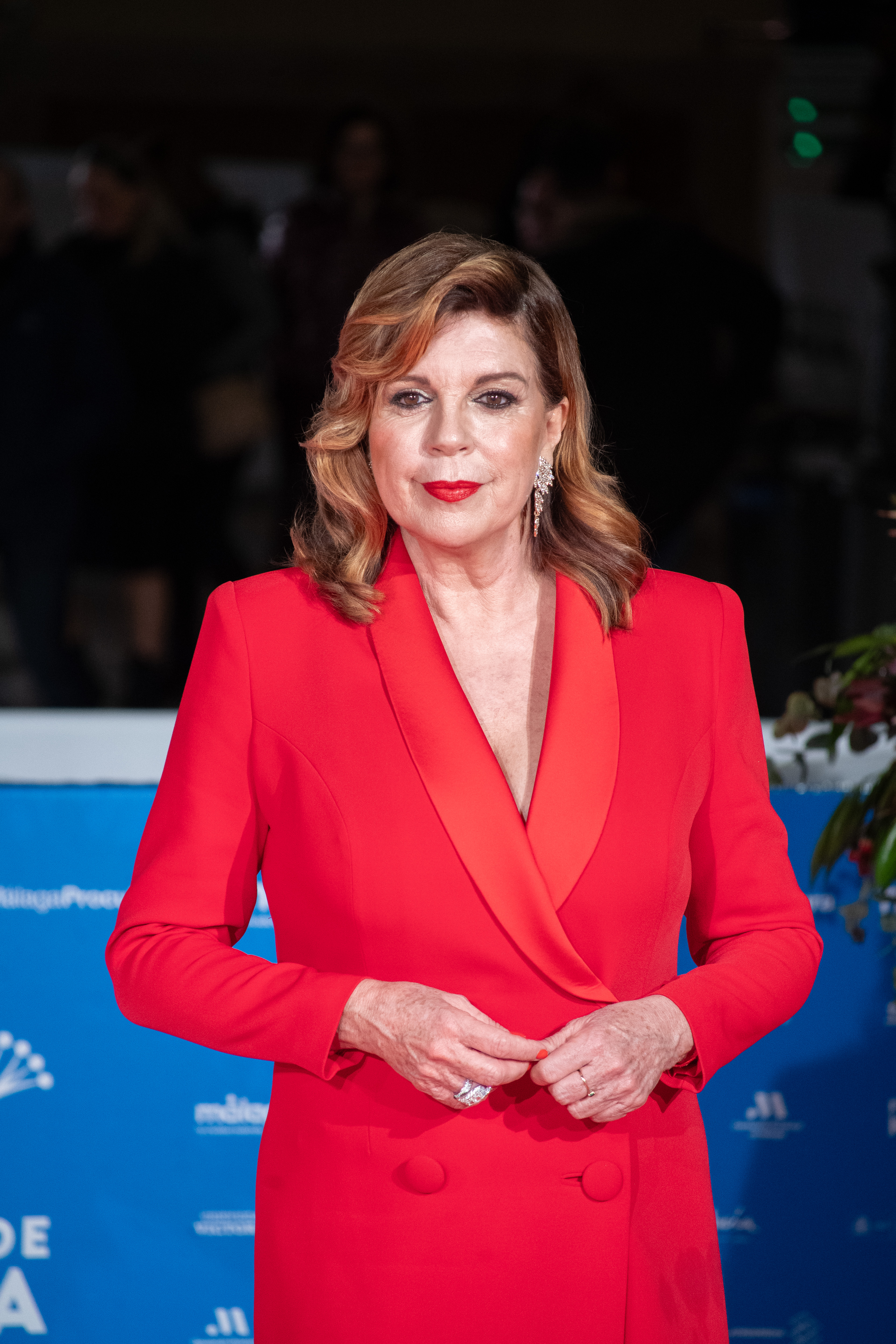
- Washington in 2024
- Born: Belinda María Washington Baca; August 29, 1963 (age 62); Altrincham, Cheshire, England
- Citizenship: Spain; United Kingdom
- Years active: 1991-present
- Known for: Television presenter, actress
- Spouse: Luis Miguel Lázaro (married 1991–present)
- Children: 2

Belinda María Washington Baca (born 29 August 1963) is a British-Spanish actress, former television presenter and singer.

== Biography ==
After studying law, Media and Drama she started her television career in 1991 with Jesús Hermida on Antena 3's topical magazine show El programa de Hermida.

After this first appearance in front of the cameras, she started her acting career in 1994 on Antena 3's Hermanos de leche with José Coronado. she came to fame on Telecinco where she presented ¡Qué me dices! with José Antonio Botella and the successful variety show De domingo a domingo from 1997 until 1998. Later she stood in for Carmen Sevilla on Telecupón before returning to Antena 3 to host the flop La trituradora. She also presented Grandiosas with Rosa Villacastín and Lolita Flores, and also TVE reality documentaries about parenting such as El planeta de los niños and Padres en apuros. She also stood in for Inés Ballester on hypnosis show Flashback: Regreso al pasado.

She continued her acting career on Antena 3's La casa de los líos in 2000, TVE's Con dos tacones in 2006 and Telecinco's Hermanos y detectives two years later. In 2006 she appeared on ¡Mira quién baila! and finished third. And in 2011, 2017 and 2018, she appeared on Tu cara me suena. In 2022 she returned to acting in Señor, dame paciencia and took part in the Telecinco reality game show Eso lo hago yo.

== Television career ==
Cinema acting
Year	Series	Character
1999	Manolito Gafotas	Madre Orejones
2000	¡Ja me maaten...!	Susan
2013	Caminante (short film)	Mara

Television acting
Year	Series	Channel	Character	Notes
1994	Vecinos	Antena 3	Ágata	19 episodes
1994	Farmacia de guardia	Antena 3	Clienta	1 episode
1994	Hermanos de leche	Antena 3	Emi	7 episodes
1996	Médico de familia	Telecinco	"Belinda"	1 episode
2000	La casa de los líos	Antena 3	Teresa	3 episodes
2003	El comisario	Telecinco	Elena Barrios	1 episode
2004	Mis adorables vecinos	Antena 3	Elena	1 episode
2006	Con dos tacones	TVE 1	Mari Mar	5 episodes
2007	Hospital central	Telecinco	Journalist	2 episodes
2008	Lex	Antena 3	Woman	1 episode
2008-09	Hermanos y detectives	Telecinco	Inés Altolaguirre	12 episodes
2009	Somos complices	Antena 3	Susana González-Avilés	2 episodes
2010	Valientes	Cuatro	Alicia Varela	45 episodes
2011	Homicidios	Telecinco	Paulina	1 episode
2012	Carmina	Telecinco	Pilar Lezcano	1 episode
2013	Niños robados	Telecinco	Dolores del Prat	2 episodes
2014	Ciega a citas	Cuatro	Piluca Aranda	137 episodes
2015	Algo que celebrar	Antena 3	"Felicidad"	2 episodes
2015-16, 2018	Yo quisiera	Divinity	Asunta	86 episodes
2016	Lo que escondían sus ojos	Telecinco	Pura Huétor	4 episodes
2016-19	Paquita Salas	Netflix	Herself	5 episodes
2018-19	Pasionaria millennial	Instagram	Lola Cascón	10 episodes
2020	Rubí	Televisa (Mexico)	Queen of Spain	2 episodes
2022	Señor, dame paciencia	Antena 3	Candela	8 episodes
2022	La que se avecina	Amazon Prime Video	Elisabeth "Elisa" Nevado	1 episode

Television presenting
Year	Series	Channel	Notes
1991-92	El programa de Hermida	Antena 3	
1995-98	¡Qué me dices!	Telecinco	
1997	Moros y cristianos	Telecinco	
1997-98	De domingo a domingo	Telecinco	
1997-2001	Telecupón	Telecinco	
1999	La trituradora	Antena 3	
2000	Grandiosas	Telecinco	
2002	La corriente alterna	Telecinco	
2002-03	El planeta de los niños	TVE 1	
2002-03	Flashback: Regreso al pasado	Canal Sur	
2003-04	Padres en apuros	TVE 2	
2004	Abierto por la mañana	Telemadrid	
2006	Plaza mayor	CMM	
2006	¡Mira quién baila!	TVE 1	
2011	¡Qué tiempo tan feliz!	Telecinco	
2011	Tu cara me suena	Antena 3	Contestant
2016	Amigas y conocidas	La 1	
2017	Me lo dices o me lo cantas	Telecinco	Contestant; winner
2018	Tu cara me suena	Antena 3	Contestant
2019	Adivina qué hago esta noche	Cuatro	Celebrity contestant
2019	Ven a cenar conmigo: Gourmet edición	Telecinco	
2020	1, 2, 3... hipnotízame	Antena 3	
2020-21	Tu cara me suena	Antena 3	
2022	Esta noche gano yo	Telecinco	
2023	Tu cara me suena	Antena 3	Duet with Agustín Jiménez

== Personal life ==
Belinda was born to a Scottish father and mother from Málaga. She also enjoys painting and opened an exhibition called "Paseando el silencio" ('Silence passing') in Madrid in 2020, before it shut due to the COVID-19 pandemic. It reopened in 2022.

She married Luis Miguel Lázaro in 1991, and the couple have two daughters, Andrea and Daniela. Andrea studied Fine Arts and Design and often attends art shows with her mother.
