= Chapel of the Virgen del Puerto (Madrid) =

- Ermita de la Virgen del Puerto (Spanish)
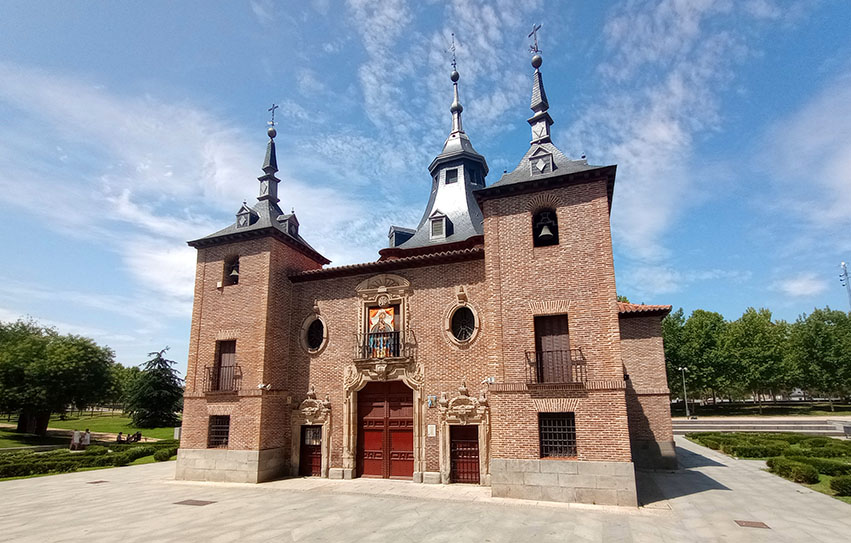

- Location within Spain
- 40.415511°N 3.721271°W
- Location: Madrid, Spain

Spanish Cultural Heritage
- Official name: Ermita de la Virgen del Puerto
- Type: Non-movable
- Criteria: Monument
- Designated: 1946
- Reference no.: RI-51-0001174

The Chapel of the Virgen del Puerto (Spanish: Ermita de la Virgen del Puerto) is a chapel located in Madrid, Spain. It was declared Bien de Interés Cultural in 1946.
