= Luis Cepeda =

Spanish singer-songwriter (born 1989)

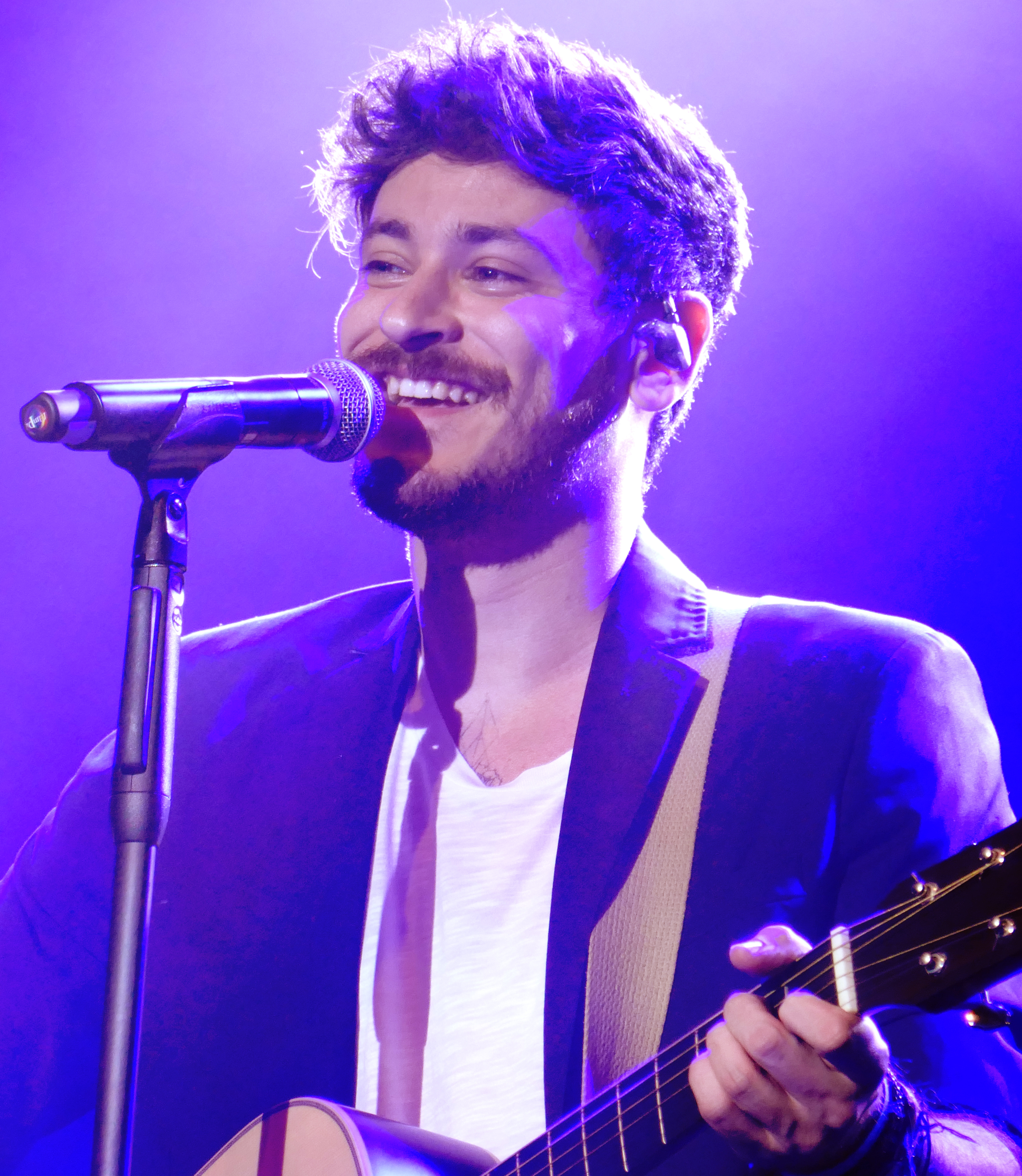
- Luis Cepeda live in Figueres (2020)

Background information
- Also known as: Cepeda
- Born: Luis Cepeda Fernández; 26 August 1989 (age 37); Ourense, Galicia
- Genres: Pop; pop rock
- Occupations: Singer-songwriter; composer
- Instrument: Guitar
- Years active: 2015–present
- Label: Universal Music (2018–present)
- Website: Official website

Luis Cepeda Fernández (born 26 August 1989), also known as Cepeda, is a Spanish singer and songwriter.

== Early life ==
Luis Cepeda was born in Province of Ourense, Galicia on 26 August 1989 to Encarna Fernández, a teacher, and Luis Cepeda, an architect and luthier. He grew up without a TV, surrounded by music, radio stations and newspapers. He was an autodidact, and started playing the guitar looking at his father and online tutorials.

Cepeda was linked to the music and arts through his family careers. His uncle was Alberto Cepeda, bandmate of the rock band, Desmadre 75, a very popular group in Spain in the 1970s.

He started to pursue a musical career after leaving home for his studies. Cepeda went to University of A Coruña, where he stayed for three architecture courses. He later moved to Madrid to study technical engineering and industrial design at Alfonso X El Sabio University. At this point, he also pursued one of his passions, basketball, playing for the institution teams. In Madrid, still trying to pursue a musical career, he started to work for an NGO, meeting people at the street singing.

== Career ==
=== 2015–2016: La Voz ===
In 2015, he joined the auditions for La Voz, looking to improve his musical skills at the talent show. He started singing Wherever You Will Go, by The Calling, and, after three of the show coaches turn around – Antonio Orozco, Laura Pausini and Malú -, he choose Malú. At his first battle on the show, singing "Wake Me Up" from Avicii, he went out of the competition.

=== 2017–2018: Operación Triunfo ===
In 2017 he entered Spanish talent show Operación Triunfo. During the show, he was selected to sing with Colombian band Morat their song "Yo contigo, tú conmigo" at the second live show. In the contest, he sang cover songs of "No puedo vivir sin ti" (Los Ronaldos), "Reggaetón lento (Bailemos)" (CNCO), "Complicidad" (Vanesa Martín), "Dancing on My Own" (Calum Scott), "Pedacitos de ti" (Antonio Orozco), "Quien" (Pablo Alborán), "Mi héroe" (Antonio Orozco) "Vencer al amor" (India Martínez), and "Say you won't let go" (James Arthur). He end up in ninth place, as one of the most saved contestans of all time, gaining a loyal fanbase like all of his showmates.

After the show, he embarked on a successful tour with his Operación Triunfo showmates from March to December 2019, combining the group live concerts with the start of his solo career.

He was one of the group representatives at Premios Dial, a music Award organized by Cadena Dial radio station for Spanish-speaking artists, to receive a special Award as the Music Phenomenon of the Year in Spain in 2018.

=== 2018–2020: Principios ===
After leaving Operación Triunfo in January 2018, he signed a record contract with Universal Music Group and started the songwriting process of his first album, meeting other songwriters like Andrés Suárez and David Santisteban. Santisteban was also the producer of his first album. In March 2018, Cepeda released a few second of his first original unknown song, "Por ti estaré".

On 1 June 2018 he launched his first original song, "Esta vez", reaching number 1 on the Spanish official musical charts for that week. The song was certified platinum. Two days after the single, Cepeda announced that his first album would be available on 29 June 2018. On 22 June 2018 he launched "Llegas tú", a song he started to write at Operación Triunfo, as a digital pre-sale gift. One week later, his first album, Principios, was released. He also announced record signing events and the first live concerts of his solo tour. The album was a success in Spain and was certified gold on its first week, topping the Spanish record chart five weeks in a row.

He was the guest singer on a number of Spanish singers concerts such as Antonio José, David Otero and Antonio Orozco.

On 10 October 2018 his solo tour, Gira Principios, began in Zaragoza. More than 40 concerts later, the tour ended on 25 January 2020 in Figueres.

After the success of his first album, on 14 June 2019 a re-released version was launched, named Nuestros Principios, with nine additional songs. Adding the two version sales, it was certified platinum on its first week on the market; on 24 March 2019, the first single of the new release was launched, "Mi reino". The album includes two featuring songs with Antonio José and India Martínez.

On 28 September 2019 he started a joint tour with former Operación Triunfo cast member Ana Guerra, "Gira imginBank". It ended on 21 January 2020 after 16 concerts.

=== 2020–present: Con Los Pies en el Suelo ===
In 2020, Cepeda announced his second album, Con Los Pies en el Suelo (Keeping Both Feet on the Ground). Due to the COVID-19 pandemic, the initial release planning was changed.

"Gentleman", the first single from the album, was released on 13 March 2020, and met with positive reviews.

On 24 July 2020 "Si tú existieras" was chosen as the second single from the album. It is a ballad inspired by the works of British singer James Arthur and British band Coldplay.

On 15 August 2020 Cepeda sang "Acordes Menores" at his concert at La Santa Market in Girona. He later released "2007", a duet with David Otero that was included on the album.

On 9 October 2020 the album was released alongside its third single, the title track "Con Los Pies en el Suelo".

== Discography ==
Albums

- Principios (2018)
- Con Los Pies en el Suelo (2020)
- Sempiterno (2022)
