= Raoul Vázquez =

Spanish singer, songwriter, and musician (born 1997)

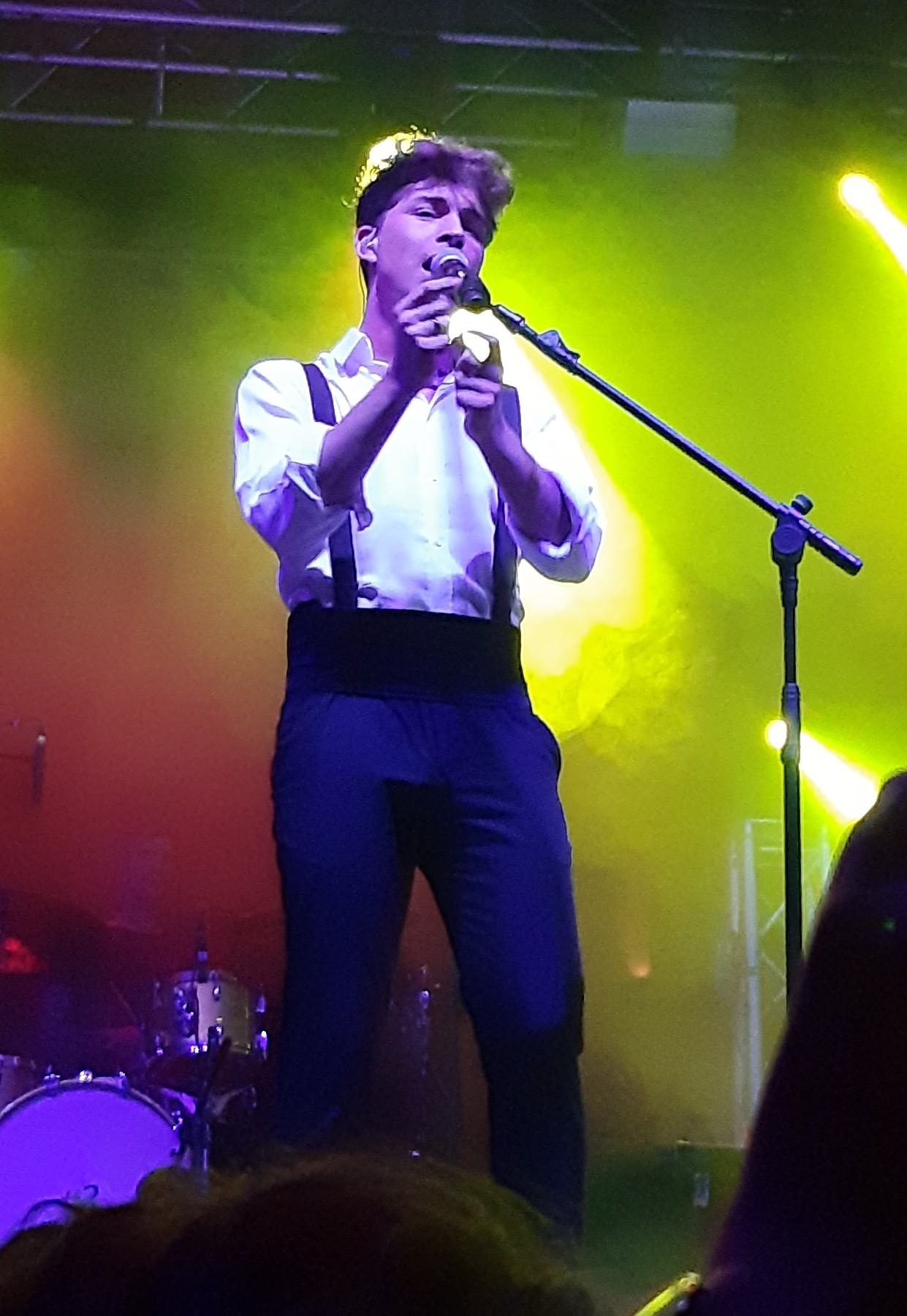

Background information
- Born: Raoul Vázquez García; 19 March 1997 (age 29); Montgat (Barcelona), Spain
- Genre: Pop
- Occupation: Singer
- Instruments: Vocals; Piano
- Years active: 2017–present

Raoul Vázquez García (born 19 March 1997 in Montgat, Barcelona, Spain) is a Spanish singer, songwriter and musician. He began to gain renown at the end of 2016 when he competed in the fourth edition in Spain of the talent show The Voice. However, his launch to fame came a year later, on the last trimester of 2017, following his participation in the ninth edition of Spanish talent Operación Triunfo 2017. In December 2018 he made a musical collaboration with Belén Aguilera with a song that became his first published work, “Tus monstruos” (Your monsters). After that, in June 2019, he released his first solo single, “Estaré ahí” (I'll be there).

== Early life ==
Raoul was born in Barcelona (Spain) and is the second son of Susana García and Manuel Vázquez. His older brother is the renowned football player Álvaro Vázquez. Due to his brother's work, Raoul had to move to Swansea (Wales) when he was fourteen years old. Although he always wanted to become a singer, it wasn't until he was 16 that a teacher encouraged him to take singing and interpretation lessons and to participate in different castings. He then embarked in his musical education and commenced vocal technique lessons, which he later continued once he was back in Spain.

== Career ==
=== 2016: Musical beginnings and The Voice ===
To make himself known while he improving his musical abilities, Raoul started publishing videos of his song covers to Instagram while working as a bartender. In October he was selected to perform at the “blind auditions” of the talent show The Voice, which was broadcast by Telecinco in Spain. He performed “Jar of Hearts” by Christina Perri and managed to get a chair turn from Melendi, who signed him up in his Team. Afterwards, Raoul battled his teammate Job Navarrete performing the song “Impossible” by James Arthur and succeeded in beating his fellow and moved to the next stage of the contest. He was finally defeated just before the quarter-finals with his performance of “I’m not the only one” by Sam Smith. In spite of being eliminated, Melendi asked Universal Music to transfer him Raoul's publishing rights so he could help him launching his first recordwork.

=== 2017: Operación Triunfo ===
In Spring 2017, while he worked as a bellboy and singer in a hotel in Ibiza, he attended the castings for Operación Triunfo 2017, a reality talent show that is the original Spanish version of the Star Academy franchise. After a long selection process, in October, Raoul was chosen to enter the academy following his live performance of “Catch and Release” by Matt Simons during the OT 2017 Edition's First Gala. During this edition of the contest Raoul stood out with his outstanding version of “Million Reasons” by Lady Gaga. Raoul was the seventh expelled contestant of the program with a 46% of the votes against the 54% of his fellow Cepeda. Once Operación Triunfo was over, the sixteen contestants began a national tour of twenty five concerts celebrated all across Spain, between March and December 2018, including emblematic places like the Santiago Bernabéu Stadium (where they performed in front of 60.000 people, or three times in the Palau Sant Jordi in front of 51.000 people). In those concerts Raoul performed coral songs with all the rest of his fellows, “Million Reasons” by himself and “Manos Vacías” (Empty Hands) by Miguel Bosé alongside his partner Agoney, a song that became a motto in the fight against homophobia.

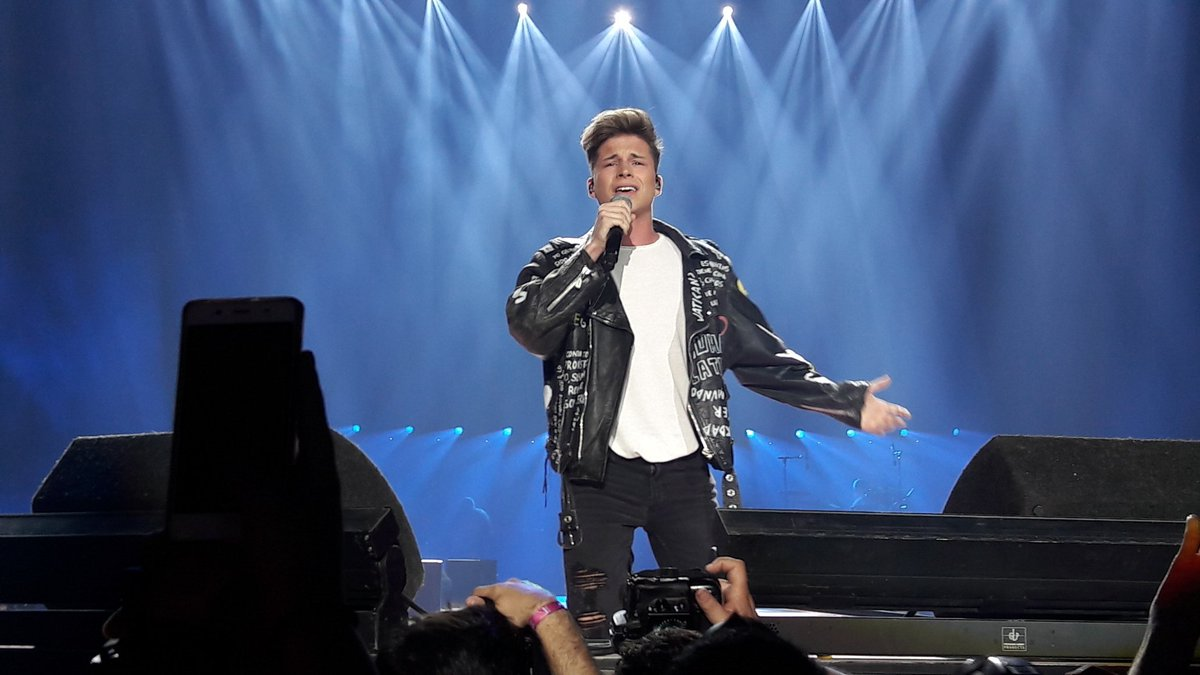
Raoul Vázquez at the Wizink Center in Madrid, CCME 2018

=== 2018–present: After Operación Triunfo ===
After Operación Triunfo, Raoul signed a contract with Universal Music for the launching of his career as a singer. During 2018's first semester he worked with three of his Operación Triunfo fellows - Mimi Doblas, Nerea Rodríguez and Agoney – considering the establishment of a band named “Delta”, a project that was discarded and eventually each one of them undertook a solo career.

In October 2018 Raoul took part in the Coca-Cola Music Experience Festival, celebrated at the WiZink Center in Madrid, where he presented in front of 15.000 people a first version of a song that later on was launched as his first single, “Estaré ahí”. Besides, that month he signed with Javier Calvo and Javier Ambrossi in the musical “La Llamada” (Holy Camp!), staged in the Lara Theater, in order to play the role of God. He has been performing in numerous occasions, since then and to the present day, and has participated as well in the national tour of "La LLamada" during 2019. In December 2018 Raoul presented “Tus monstruos” with his fellow in The Voice, Belén Aguilera. In June 2019, Raoul finally launched “Estaré ahí”, his first single, a melodic ballad of which he is singer, writer and co-producer and is based on his own personal experiences. The video clip was seen by more than 200.000 people in YouTube during the first day after his launching, and the song was #1 in all digital sale platforms.

At the beginning of 2020 Raoul made a 4-concert tour with his Operación Triunfo fellows Nerea Rodríguez and Ricky Merino. They made concerts in Barcelona, Bilbao, Málaga y Madrid. In February 2020, Raoul participated as Nerea Rodríguez's guest in the contest Tu cara me suena (Your Face Sounds Familiar) imitating with her, the performance of “Señorita” by Shawn Mendes and Camila Cabello. In September 2020, he collaborated with Spanish singer and friend Mireya Bravo on the duet song "Pídeme", it was #1 in iTunes Spain and Amazon music. In June 2021 Raoul released the single "Caníbales" with the collaboration of DJ Hektor Mass, the song was #1 in iTunes Spain and Argentina.

== Discography ==
See also: Operación Triunfo 2017 Discography

Year	Title	Details
2018	"Tus monstruos"	with Belén Aguilera
2018	"El mundo entero" (The Whole World)	Single with Aitana, Agoney, Ana Guerra and Lola índigo
2019	"Por ti" (For you)	Original Motion Picture Soundtrack with Nerea Rodríguez
2019	"Estaré ahí" (I'll be there)	First solo single
2020	"Pídeme"	with Mireya Bravo
2021	"Caníbales"	with Hektor Mass
2023	"El niño"	-
2023	"Prisionero"	-
2023	"Un Ganador"	with Javi Calvo
2023	"Interludio I"	with Loles León
2023	"Su Principe"	-
2023	"Lobo Feroz"	-
2023	"Interludio II"	-
2023	"Ansiedad"	-
2023	"Lo que debe pasar"	-
2023	"Nunca Imaginaría"	-
2023	"Por Pecados Como Tu "	-
2023	"Chicos de oro.mp3"	-

== Filmography ==
On 2016, Raoul acted in the short film “Jóvenes sin libertad” (Youngsters with no freedom), based on real-life events and depicting a situation about school bullying on a young transsexual. Raoul played the role of Héctor.

On 2018, he recorded alongside his Operación Triunfo fellows Aitana Ocaña, Ana Guerra, Mimi Doblas and Agoney Herández and the Canarian rap artist Maikel Delacalle the single and TV commercial for Coca-Cola, titled “El mundo entero” (The Whole World).

On 2019 the French animation film “Terra Willy: Planeta Desconocido” (Terra Willy: An Unknown Planet) was released and Raoul was the Spanish and Catalan dubber for Buck, one of the main characters of the movie.

Year	Program	Channel	Notes
2016	“The Voice”	Telecinco	Participant
2017–2018	“Operación Triunfo”	TVE	Contestant
2019	“La mejor canción jamás cantada”	TVE	Guest
2020	“Tu cara me suena”	Antena 3	Guest
2024	"Tu cara me suena"	Antena 3	Contestant
