= Agoney =

Spanish singer (born 1995)

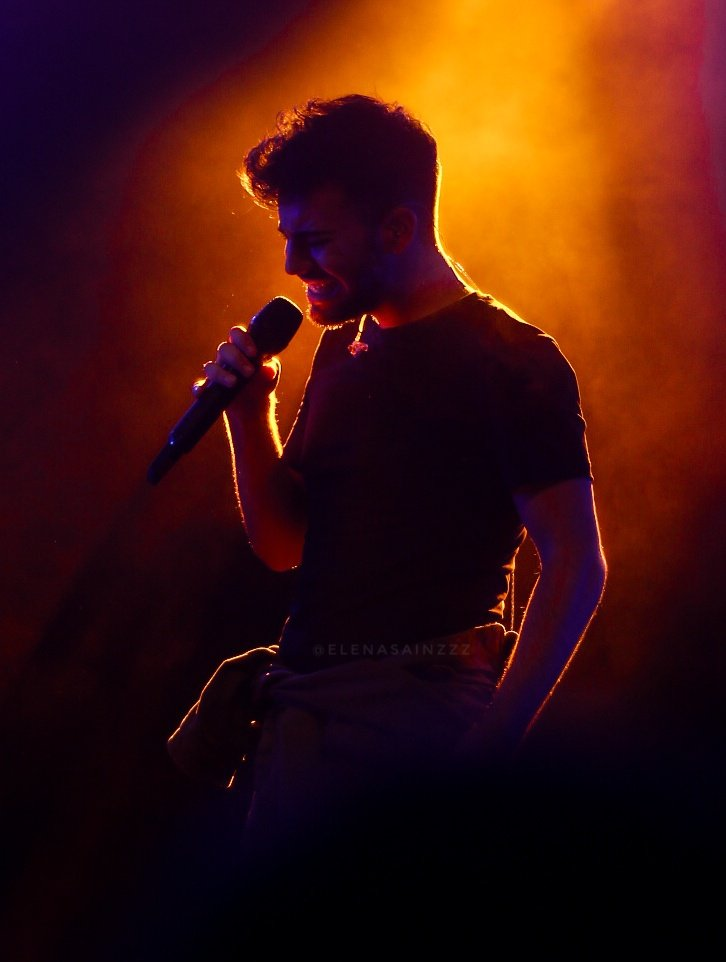
- Agoney during a concert in 2018.

Background information
- Born: Agoney Hernández Morales; 18 October 1995 (age 30); Adeje (Tenerife), Spain
- Genres: Pop; Indie pop; R&B
- Occupation: Singer
- Instruments: Vocals; piano; trumpet
- Years active: 2017–present
- Label: Universal Music
- Website: agoneyoficial.com

Agoney Hernández Morales (Adeje, Tenerife, Spain, 18 October 1995), also known as Agoney, is a Spanish singer, composer and performer who rose to fame from his participation on the Operación Triunfo 2017 programme. Due to his great vocal potential and the versatility of his voice—and in reference to his home of the Canary Islands—he has been nicknamed "the Canary with the golden voice".

== Early life ==
Agoney Hernández Morales was born on 18 October 1995 in Adeje, Santa Cruz de Tenerife. At the age of six, he began to play the trumpet in a band, and later continued studying music in Tenerife. He attended a performing arts high school and before entering Operación Triunfo, he worked as a singer at a hotel in Tenerife.

== Career ==
=== Operación Triunfo 2017 ===
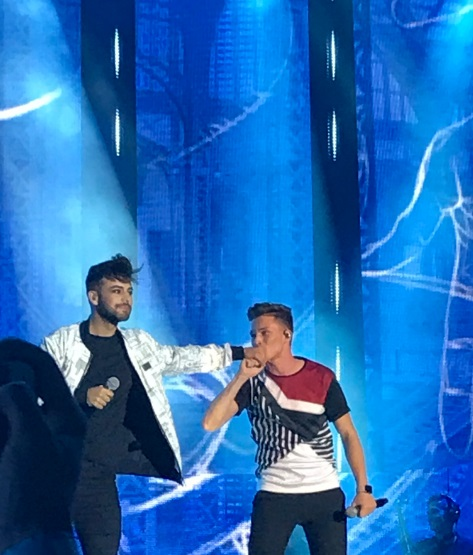
Agoney in Concert in Valencia with his partner Raoul Vázquez singing "Manos Vacías"

In 2017, Agoney appeared at the casting of Operación Triunfo 2017, a reality talent show that is the original Spanish version of the Star Academy franchise. Agoney was chosen as one of the 16 participants of the talent show. He was eliminated in gala 12 after a very close vote against fellow contestant Ana Guerra who won with 50.3% of the two million votes. Once finished in the contest, Agoney was part of the Spanish Operación Triunfo tour, performing in such notable venues as the Palau Sant Jordi in Barcelona, the Olympic Stadium in La Cartuja in Seville, the Bizkaia Arena in Bilbao, and the Santiago Bernabéu Stadium in Madrid.

=== 2018–2019: After Operación Triunfo ===
After finishing the tour of Operación Triunfo 2017, Agoney's solo career began. On 31 August 2018 he released his debut single, "Quizás" (Spanish for "maybe"). The song's lyrics are aimed at those who did not believe in him. Musically "Quizás" has been compared to artists such as Mika, Troye Sivan and Adam Lambert. "Quizás" received rave reviews and reached number one on the Spanish iTunes singles chart. The music video for the song reached one million views on YouTube in less than 48 hours. In December 2018 he sang with Ana Guerra, Lola Índigo, Raoul and Aitana for the Coca-Cola advertising campaign for Christmas.

After passing through Operation Triunfo, Agoney has become an icon of the LGBT community. He was one of the opening speakers at LGTBI+ Pride of Madrid 2018.

Agoney appeared at the 2019 Gran Canaria Drag Queen Contest, where he performed a dance remix of his single "Quizás" as part of the interval show.

In March 2019, Agoney competed on the Spanish music television series La mejor canción jamás cantada (The Best Song Ever Sung). He won the 2010s episode with his performance of Pastora Soler's Eurovision 2012 entry "Quédate conmigo" and placed second in the grand final with his performance of David Bisbal's 2001 single "Ave María".

In August 2019, Agoney released his second solo single, "Black". The song was written by Agoney and gives commentary on modern society and the pressures of social media. It was accompanied by a music video directed by Frankie De Leonardis. In November of that year, Agoney made his first musical tour outside of Spain visiting Argentina.

=== 2020-2023: Libertad and Benidorm Fest ===
In 2020, Agoney released the singles "Libertad", "MÁS" and "Edén", along with his debut album Libertad. The album debuted at No.1 on the Spanish albums chart.

The same year Agoney also released the single "Strangers", a collaboration with the producer Brian Cross and he was part of Rosana Arbelo's charity single "Sin miedo 2020". He sang as part of "Piensa en positivo", the official anthem of Madrid Pride 2020.

In 2021, Agoney released a cover of Erasure's "A Little Respect" as part of the soundtrack of the Spanish film El Cover. He also made a cameo appearance in the film. Later that year, he released the single "¿Quién pide al cielo por ti?", co-written with Alberto Jiménez of the indie-pop group Miss Caffeina.

Agoney was confirmed as one of the competing acts in the ninth series (2021/2022) of the Spanish celebrity impersonation show Tu cara me suena. He went on to win the series after picking up 53% of the vote following his grand final imitation of Dimash Kudaibergen singing "SOS d'un terrien en détresse". Coinciding with the show's grand final, Agoney also released his single "Bangover", which became Number 1 on iTunes in Spain, Chile and Argentina.

On July 14, 2022, Agoney released a new single titled "Cachito".

On October 26, 2022, his participation in the Benidorm Fest 2023 was announced, an event held to select the representative candidacy of Spain in the Eurovision Song Contest that year. On December 19, Agoney published on his social networks the song "Quiero arder", his entry for the Benidorm Fest 2023, starting as the great favorite of the public. He competed in the first semi-final on January 31, 2023, and placed first with 161 points, winning the expert jury vote and televote, and thus qualifying for the final. Agoney went on to place second in the final overall with a total of 145 points.

=== 2023-Actuality: After Benidorm Fest and Dicotomía ===
On July 14, 2023, he published his new single "Intacto", which incorporates elements of contemporary music fused with pop melodies, with a very personal and differentiating sound. The song refers to people who hide behind social networks to send hate messages. After its publication, "Intacto" became No. 1 on iTunes in Spain.

On 14 June, 2024, he presents "Redención", a new preview of his second album, a conceptual melody that mixes pop and electronic rhythms with lyrics that talk about the importance of self-acceptance.

At the end of that month, the title of his next album, "Dicotomía," was announced, which went on pre-sale on 28 June. The album was released on September 20 of that year.

== Personal life ==
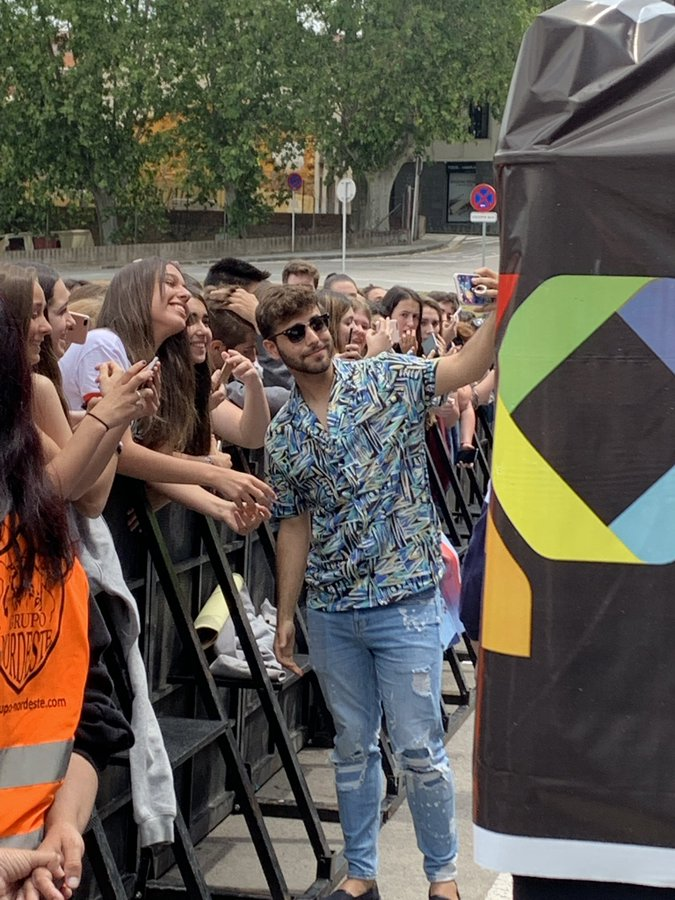
Agoney with his fans at a LOS40 event in 2019

Agoney is influenced by Queen, Whitney Houston, Rachelle Ferrell and Muse.

He is openly gay, having defended the visibility and rights of the LGBT community during Operación Triunfo and the national tour after it. Agoney was selected as one of the speakers at the opening ceremony of Madrid Pride 2018 and was featured on the cover of the winter 2018/2019 issue of the Spanish LGBT travel magazine Shangay Voyager. He is in a relationship with Spanish dancer Marc Montojo since 2022. They made their relationship public by sharing a kiss after Agoney's victory on Tu cara me suena.

=== Philanthropy ===
Agoney is an ambassador of Fundación Canaria Carrera por la Vida (the Canary Islands Walk For Life Foundation), a Canary Islands charity which supports and raises awareness of breast cancer. He appeared as the August photo in the 2019 charity calendar for the organisation.

In November 2019, Agoney joined the TV presenter Emma García and actress Eva Isanta to front a humorous campaign to encourage early HIV testing in Spain. In May 2020, he sang as part of Rosana Arbelo's charity single "Sin miedo 2020", in aid of the Spanish Red Cross. Agoney was also part of the official anthem of Madrid Pride 2020, a cover of Fangoria's "Piensa en positivo". In April 2022, together with other artists from the Spanish national scene, he participated in the benefit concert "Unidos por la paz: Ucrania en el corazón", organized by Radio Televisión Española in order to raise funds for the victims of the Ukrainian War.

On December 15, 2023, Agoney was one of the guest artists who participated in the charity concert called "Juntos por los Montes de Tenerife", an event held to raise funds for those affected by the 2023 Tenerife wildfire, held in Santa Cruz de Tenerife.

In 2024, he was a preacher of the activities on the occasion of Pride Day in Adeje, his hometown.

== Discography ==
=== Albums ===
Title	Details	Peak chart positions
Title	Details	SPA
Libertad	Released: 28 August 2020; Formats: CD, digital download, LP; Label: Universal Music Spain	1
Dicotomía	Released: 20 September 2024; Formats: CD, digital download, LP; Label: Universal Music Spain	4

==== Live albums ====
Title	Details	Peak chart positions
Title	Details	SPA
Libertad Tour	Released: 15 December 2022; Formats: CD, digital download, LP; Label: Universal Music Spain	43

=== Singles ===
==== As lead artist ====
Title	Year	Peak chart positions	Album
Title	Year	SPA	Album
"Quizás"	2018	18	Libertad
"Black"	2019	82	Libertad
"Libertad"	2020	—	Libertad
"Strangers" (with Brian Cross)	2020	—	Non-album single
"MÁS"	2020	—	Libertad
"Edén"	2020	—	Libertad
"¿Quién pide al cielo por ti?"	2021	—	Non-album single
"Bangover"	2022	—	Non-album single
"Cachito"	2022	—	Non-album single
"Quiero arder"	2022	—	Dicotomía
"Intacto"	2023	—	Non-album single
"Tormenta"	2024	—	Dicotomía
"Redención"	2024	—	Dicotomía
"Éxtasis"	2024	—	Dicotomía
"—" denotes a single that did not chart or has not yet been released.

==== Other appearances ====
Title	Year	Peak chart positions	Album
Title	Year	SPA	Album
"Magia" (with Miriam Rodríguez)	2018	65	Miriam: Sus Canciones
"El mundo entero" (with Aitana, Ana Guerra, Lola Indigo and Raoul Vázquez feat. Maikel Delacalle)	2018	—	Non-album single
"Sin miedo 2020" (with Rosana)	2020	—	Non-album single
"Piensa en positivo" (with Various artists)	2020	—	Non-album single
"Más besos" (with Barei, Rozalén and Various artists)	2021	—	Non-album single
"—" denotes a single that did not chart or has not yet been released.

=== Music videos ===
Song	Year	Director
"Quizás"	2018	Nacho Mohedano
"Black"	2019	Frankie de Leonardis
"Libertad"	2020	Agoney Hernández Morales
"MÁS"	2020	Saot St
"Edén"	2020	Agoney Hernández Morales
"A Little Respect"	2021	TBA
"¿Quién pide al cielo por ti?"	2021	Salva Musté
"A Little Respect"	2022	TBA
"Bangover"	2022	TBA
"Cachito"	2022	TBA

== Awards and nominations ==
=== Premios El Suplemento ===
Year	Category	Ceremony	Result	Ref.
2020	National revelation artist	IX Premio Nacional El Suplemento	Winner	

=== Actuality Awards ===
Year	Category	Ceremony	Result	Ref.
2020	Best album - National category	Actuality Awards 2020	Nominated	

=== Other awards ===
Year	Category	Ceremony	Result	Ref.
2022	Solidarity award	Héroes y heroínas LGTB+ Togaytherland 2022	Winner	
2022	Premio Diversa a la Música	Premio Diversa	Winner	
2025	Top 50 Music Awards 2025	Best Artist or Group	Nominated	

== Filmography ==
=== Film ===
Year	Title	Role	Notes
2021	El Cover	Himself	Performed "A Little Respect"

=== Television ===
Year	Title	Role	Notes
2017–2018	Operación Triunfo 2017	Himself	Placed sixth
2018	Tu cara me suena	Himself	Episode 6 (guest performer)
2018	Operación Triunfo 2018	Himself	Guest
2019	La mejor canción jamás cantada	Himself	Episode 7 (guest performer), episode 8 (heat winner), episode 9 (series runner-up)
2019	Trabajo temporal	Himself	Episode 8
2020	Viajeros Cuatro: Tenerife	Himself	Episode 12 (third season)
2020	Cocina al punto con Peña y Tamara	Himself	Episode 65 (first season)
2021–2022	Tu cara me suena	Himself	Contestant of the 9th season. Winner.
2022	Dúos increíbles	Himself	Series runner-up
2023	Tu cara me suenaː Gala de Reyes	Himself	Special episode runner-up
2023	Benidorm Fest 2023	Himself	Song contest runner-up
2024	Gala 60 aniversario de TVE Canarias	Himself	Guest
