= Gemeliers =

Spanish sibling duo

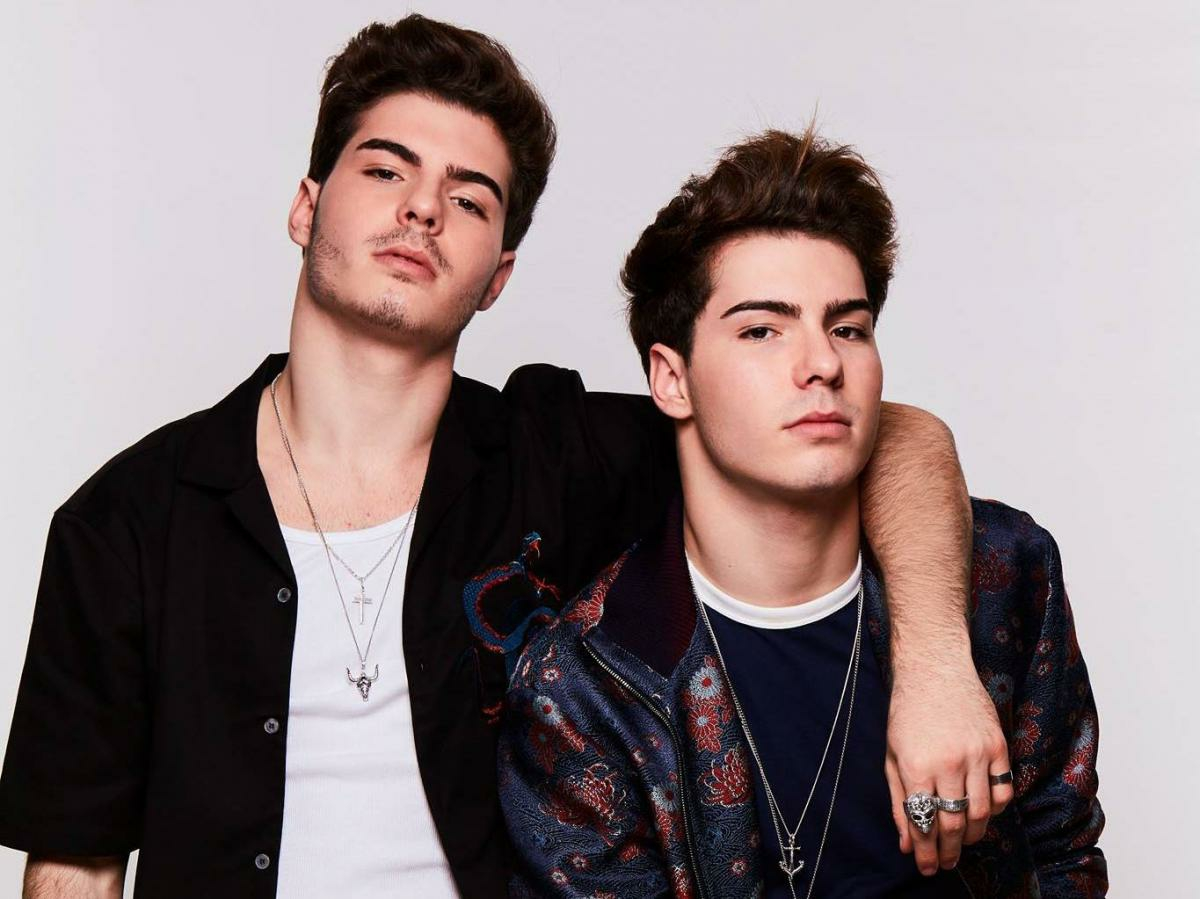
Jesús and Daniel, members of Gemeliers.

Gemeliers is a Spanish music group who rose to fame as La Voz Kids contestants in 2014. Up to now, they have achieved four number-one albums in Spain, with their most recent being the album Stereo on 28 June 2018. They were also nominated for "Favorite Italian Singer" in the 2017 Kids' Choice Awards.

== Discography ==
=== Albums ===
Title	Details	Peak chart positions
Title	Details	SPA
Lo mejor está por venir	Released: 2014	1
Mil y una noches	Released: 2015	1
Gracias (as Gmlrs)	Released: 2016	1
Stereo	Released: 2018	1
