= Miriam Rodríguez =

Spanish singer

- Born: Miriam Rodríguez Gallego; 30 September 1996 (age 29); Pontedeume, A Coruña, Spain
- Genres: Pop · pop rock
- Occupation: Singer
- Instruments: Voice, guitar, ukulele
- Years active: 2013–present
- Label: Universal Music

Miriam Rodríguez Gallego is a Spanish singer best known for taking part in the ninth series of Operación Triunfo, in which she finished in third place behind runner-up Aitana and winner Amaia. After the show ended, she was signed alongside the other contestants by Universal Music.

== Career ==
=== Early years ===
Miriam started out as a wedding singer and performing concerts in small halls and bars in Galicia. She took part in several local and regional talent contests across Galicia, including the 2013 edition of Canta Ferrol, which she won. In 2016, she released her debut single, Me cansé de esperar, with Chechu Salgado, and also played a small part in TVG series Serramoura.

=== Operación Triunfo and Eurovision Song Contest bid (2017-2018) ===
In October 2017, she was announced as one of the 18 selected contestants for the opening gala of the ninth series of Operación Triunfo. After performing No te pude retener (originally by Vanesa Martín) she was among the 16 contestants granted a spot in the show's academy. Throughout the series' run, the jury nominated her to leave the academy four times, but she would be saved either by the academy staff or the other contestants' vote, meaning she never was directly up for elimination. In the final, held on 5 February 2018, Miriam performed Malú's Invisible to advance to the second round, in which the top 3 contestants (herself, Aitana and Amaia) had to reprise their respective Gala 0 songs. After the voting window closed, it was announced that she had finished in third place after receiving only 12% of the votes from the viewers.

==== Performances on Operación Triunfo ====
Operación Triunfo performances and results
Week	Song	Result
Gala 0	"No te pude retener"	Saved by the jury
Gala 1	"Runnin' (Lose It All)" (with Agoney)	Saved by the jury
Gala 2	"Malibu" (with Roi Méndez)	Saved by the jury
Gala 3	"Euphoria" (with Thalía Garrido)	Saved by the jury
Gala 4	"La media vuelta"	Nominated by the jury, saved by the Academy staff
Gala 5	"Estoy hecho de pedacitos de ti" (with Cepeda)	Nominated by the jury; saved by contestants
Gala 6	"Que te Quería"	Nominated by the jury; saved by contestants
Gala 7	"Cómo hablar" (with Nerea Rodríguez)	Saved by the jury
Gala 8	"I Wanna Dance with Somebody (Who Loves Me)"	Saved by the jury
Gala 9	"Dramas y comedias"	Nominated by the jury, saved by the Academy staff
Gala 10	"Robarte un beso" (with Roi Méndez & Amaia)	Saved by the jury
Gala 10	"Quisiera ser"	Saved by the jury
Gala 11	"Cuando duermes" (with Alfred García)	Saved by the jury; qualified for the final
Gala 11	"What About Us"	Saved by the jury; qualified for the final
Gala 12	"Recuérdame"	Already qualified
Gala 12	"Valerie" (with Aitana)	Already qualified
Gala Final	"Invisible"	Advanced to second round
Gala Final	"No te pude retener"	3rd place

==== Eurovision Song Contest national final ====
All five Operación Triunfo finalists were designated as candidates to represent Spain in the Eurovision Song Contest 2018. She was allocated three songs: Camina, a group song with the rest of the finalists, Magia, a duet with Agoney (which turned him into the only non-finalist in the running), and solo track Lejos de tu piel. None of her entries made it past the first voting round in the national final, held on 29 January 2018.

=== After Operación Triunfo (2018-present) ===
In April 2018, she released her first post-OT single, Hay algo en mí, which would be featured in the soundtrack of the third season of Fox series Vis a vis. In 2019, she made a cameo in the series' fourth and final season. In 2019, she was confirmed as adviser to Pablo López for the Knockout and Final Battle rounds of the sixth series of La Voz.

== Discography ==
=== Studio albums ===
Title	Details	Peak chart position	Certifications
Sus Canciones	Release date: 26 March 2018; Label: Universal Music	5	
Cicatrices	Release date: 23 November 2018; Label: Universal Music	1	SPA: Gold
La Dirección De Tu Suerte	Release date: 3 April 2020; Label: Universal Music	2	
Línas Rojas	Release date: 23 March 2024; Label: Universal Music	2	

=== Singles ===
Year	Title	Peak chart position	Certifications	Album
2018	Lejos de tu piel	35		OT Gala Eurovisión
2018	Magia (Miriam Rodríguez & Agoney)	65		OT Gala Eurovisión
2018	Hay algo en mí	23	SPA: Gold	Cicatrices
2018	Mejor sin miedo	—		Cicatrices
2018	No! (Miriam Rodríguez & Pablo López)	38	SPA: Gold	Cicatrices
2019	"La Diferencia"	—		non-album singles
2019	"Más de lo que ves"	—		non-album singles
2020	"Desperté"	—		La Dirección De Tu Suerte
2020	"No Vuelvas"	—		La Dirección De Tu Suerte
2020	"Dos Extraños en la Ciudad"	—		La Dirección De Tu Suerte

== Filmography ==
=== Television ===
Year	Title	Character	Channel	Notes
2016	Serramoura	Isabel	TVG	3 episodes
2017-2018	Operación Triunfo 2017	Herself - Contestant	La 1	17 episodes
2018	Lo siguiente	Herself - Guest	La 1	1 episode
2018	Operación Triunfo 2018	Herself - Musical Guest	La 1	2 episodes
2019	Vis a vis	Inmate	Fox	1 episode
2019	La Voz	Herself - Adviser	Antena 3	9 episodes
