= Álvaro Soler discography =

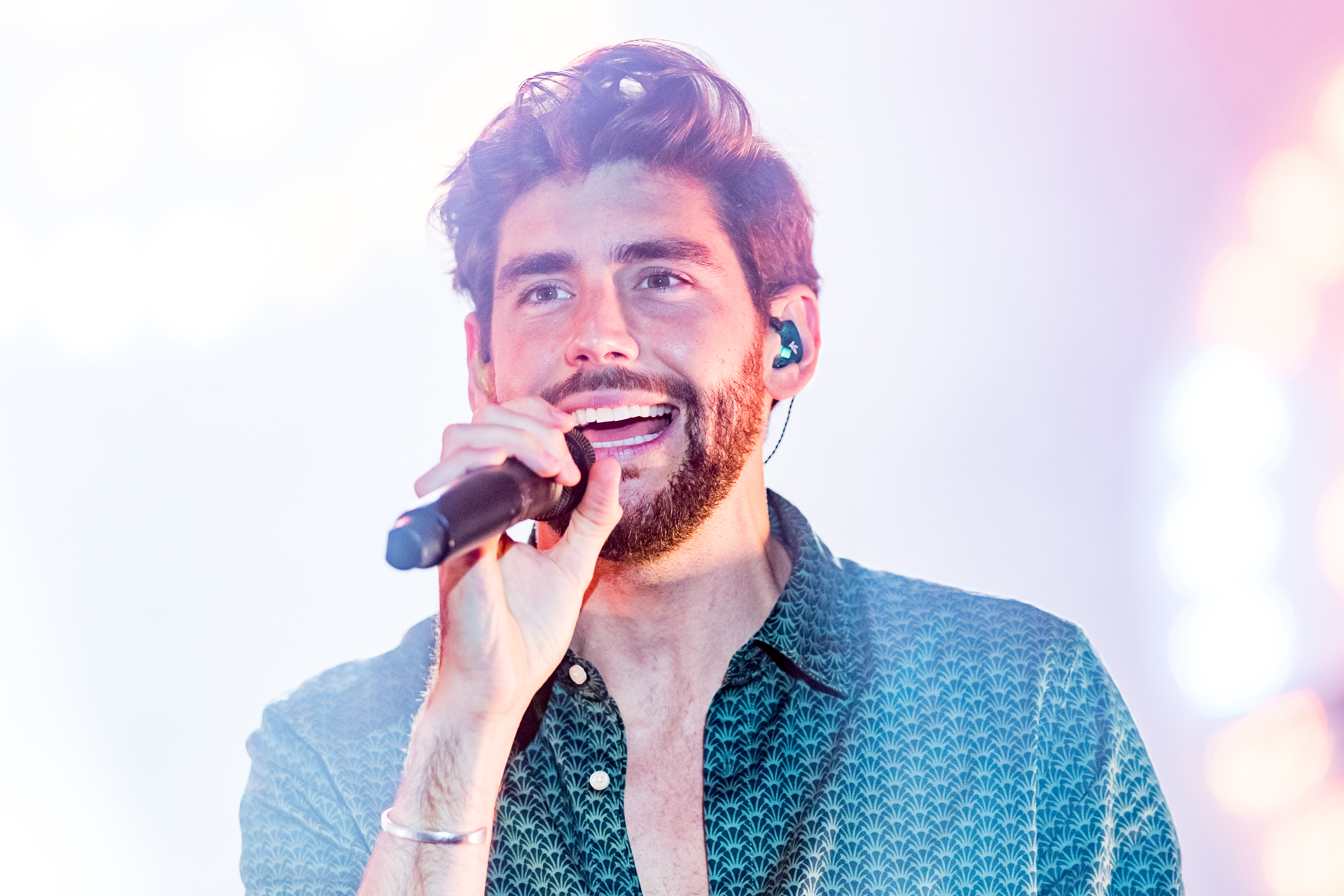
- Soler at the Zeltfestival Rhein Neckar in Mannheim in 2021.
- Studio albums: 4
- EPs: 2
- Compilation albums: 1
- Singles: 39

Spanish recording artist Álvaro Soler has released four studio albums, one compilation album, two extended plays, and more than two dozens singles as a lead artist. One of the best-selling European latin pop artists to emerge in the 2010s, he has sold over two million records, generated more than five billion combined audio and video streams, and received over 150 gold and platinum awards.

Soler recorded his debut album, Eterno agosto, in Germany under Universal Music's Airforce 1 Records imprint. Released in June 2015, it became a number-one success in Italy, Poland and Switzerland and reached Gold status in Austria, Germany, and Switzerland, while also being certified platinum by the Federazione Industria Musicale Italiana (FIMI) and diamond by the Polish Society of the Phonographic Industry (ZPAV), respectively. Sales were significantly boosted by the success of lead single "El mismo sol," which topped the charts in Italy, Poland, and Switzerland. A remix featuring American singer Jennifer Lopez also reached number one on the US Latin Airplay chart. Soler's third single "Sofia" from the deluxe version of Eterno agosto also was a major chart success, becoming a number-one hit in Belgium, Italy, Poland, and Switzerland. It has since reached 8× Platinum status in Italy.

Mar de colores, Soler's second studio album, was released in September 2018. Although it failed to match the major commercial success of its predecessor, the album reached the top ten in several countries and earned a gold certification in Austria, Germany, and Italy, as well as platinum in Poland. "La cintura," the album's lead single, became his biggest hit since "Sofia," reaching the top in Austria, Belgium, Germany, Italy, Poland, Spain, and Switzerland. Magia, Soler's third studio album, was issued in July 2021. A top five success in Austria, Germany, and Switzerland, it achieved less commercial success, though its same-titled first single went gold in Austria, Germany, and Italy and reached platinum status in Spain. In 2022, Soler's first compilation album, The Best of 2015–2022, was released. Marking his final release with Airforce 1, it became a top ten success in Germany and Switzerland. El Camino, his fourth studio album, was released on 10 October 2025 through Lavadero Records.

== Albums ==
=== Studio albums ===
List of albums, with selected chart positions and certifications
Title	Details	Peak chart positions								Certifications
Title	Details	SPA	AUT	BEL (Fl)	FRA	GER	ITA	POL	SWI	Certifications
Eterno agosto	Released: 26 June 2015; Label: Airforce 1; Formats: CD, download, streaming	25	6	38	79	5	1	1	1	BVMI: Gold; FIMI: Platinum; IFPI AUT: Gold; IFPI SWI: Gold; ZPAV: Diamond
Mar de colores	Released: 7 September 2018; Label: Airforce 1; Formats: CD, download, streaming	9	8	26	86	8	10	2	4	BVMI: Gold; IFPI AUT: Gold; FIMI: Gold; ZPAV: Platinum
Magia	Released: 9 July 2021; Label: Airforce 1; Formats: CD, download, streaming	29	4	67	—	3	32	12	2	
El Camino	Released: 10 October 2025; Label: Lavadero; Formats: CD, download, streaming	—	28	—	—	18	—	—	62	

=== Compilation albums ===
List of albums, with selected chart positions
Title	Details	Peak chart positions		
Title	Details	AUT	GER	SWI
The Best of 2015–2022	Released: 26 August 2022; Label: Airforce 1; Formats: CD, digital download, streaming	19	10	8

== Extended plays ==
List of extended plays
Title	Details
Summer Vibes 2021	Released: 11 June 2021; Label: Universal Music; Formats: Digital download, streaming
Barcelona Session	Released: 22 July 2022; Label: Airforce 1; Formats: Digital download, streaming

== Singles ==
List of singles, with selected chart positions and certifications, showing year released and album name
Title	Year	Peak positions										Certifications	Album
Title	Year	SPA	AUT	BEL (Fl)	FRA	GER	ITA	NLD	POL	SWI	US Latin	Certifications	Album
"El mismo sol" (solo or featuring Jennifer Lopez)	2015	6	6	8	31	20	1	16	1	1	11	PROMUSICAE: 2× Platinum; BEA: Gold; BVMI: Gold; FIMI: 6× Platinum; IFPI AUT: Gold; IFPI SWI: Platinum; ZPAV: 3× Platinum	Eterno agosto
"Agosto"	2015	—	—	— (Note: "Agosto" did not enter the Ultratop 50 Flanders, but peaked at number 54 on the Ultratip chart.)	—	—	—	—	1	—	—	ZPAV: Platinum	Eterno agosto
"Sofia"	2016	7	3	1	9	23	1	19	1	1	—	PROMUSICAE: 2× Platinum; BEA: Platinum; BVMI: 3× Gold; FIMI: 8× Platinum; IFPI AUT: Platinum; IFPI SWI: 2× Platinum; SNEP: Gold; ZPAV: Diamond	Eterno agosto
"Libre" (featuring Monika Lewczuk or Emma)	2016	—	—	—	—	—	26	—	1	—	—	FIMI: Platinum; ZPAV: Platinum	Eterno agosto
"Animal"	2017	—	—	— (Note: "Animal" did not enter the Ultratop 50 Flanders, but peaked at number 22 on the Ultratip chart.)	—	—	—	—	7	—	—		Eterno agosto
"Yo contigo, tú conmigo (The Gong Gong Song)" (with Morat)	2017	18	—	—	—	—	29	—	15	—	—	FIMI: Platinum; PROMUSICAE: Platinum	Mar de colores
"La cintura" (solo or featuring Flo Rida and TINI)	2018	3	4	3	82	7	2	22	3	4	46	BVMI: Gold; BEA: Gold; FIMI: 3× Platinum; IFPI AUT: Platinum; PROMUSICAE: 3× Platinum; SNEP: Platinum; ZPAV: 2× Platinum	Mar de colores
"Lo mismo" (with Maître Gims)	2018	—	—	—	—	—	—	—	—	—	—		Ceinture noire & Mar de colores
"Loca"	2019	—	—	21	—	—	—	57	12	95	—	ZPAV: Gold	Mar de Colores (Versión Extendida)
"La libertad"	2019	—	51	28	—	62	67	—	18	65	— (Note: "La Libertad" did not enter the Billboard Hot Latin Songs chart, but peaked at number 31 on the Latin Pop Songs chart.)	FIMI: Gold; ZPAV: Gold; PROMUSICAE: Gold	Mar de Colores (Versión Extendida)
"Magia"	2021	100	21	18	—	28	57	—	13	29	—	BVMI: Gold; FIMI: Gold; IFPI AUT: Gold; PROMUSICAE: Platinum	Magia
"Si te vas"	2021	—	—	—	—	—	—	—	—	—	—		Magia
"Mañana" (with Cali y El Dandee)	2021	—	—	—	—	98	76	—	43	53	—	PROMUSICAE: Gold	Magia
"Manila" (with Ray Dalton)	2021	—	15	—	—	23	—	—	37	19	—	IFPI AUT: 2x Platinum; BVMI: Gold; IFPI SWI: Gold	Non-album singles
"A contracorriente" (with David Bisbal)	2022	43	—	—	—	—	—	—	—	—	—	PROMUSICAE: 2x Platinum	Non-album singles
"Solo para ti" (with Topic)	2022	—	65	6	—	57	—	62	—	52	—	IFPI SWI: Gold	Non-album singles
"Candela" (with Nico Santos)	2022	—	—	—	—	—	—	—	—	—	—		The Best of 2015–2022
"Muero"	2023	—	—	10	—	—	—	—	—	—	—		Non-album singles
"Para vivirla"	2023	—	—	—	—	—	—	—	—	—	—		Non-album singles
"Oxígeno"	2023	—	—	—	—	—	—	—	—	—	—		Non-album singles
"Ya a ti nadie te quiere" (with Conchita)	2023	—	—	—	—	—	—	—	—	—	—		Non-album singles
"Hot Like Summer" (with Margaret)	2024	—	—	—	—	—	—	—	—	—	—		Siniaki i cekiny
"Te imaginaba"	2024	—	—	—	—	—	—	—	—	—	—		El camino
"Cero" (featuring Namayana Women's Choir)	2024	—	—	—	—	—	—	—	—	—	—		El camino
"Dicen"	2024	—	—	—	—	—	—	—	—	—	—		El camino
"Con calma"	2025	—	—	—	—	—	—	—	—	—	—		El camino
"Estrella" (with Alfred García)	2025	—	—	—	—	—	—	—	—	—	—		T'estimo es te quiero
"Regalo"	2025	—	—	—	—	—	—	—	—	—	—		El camino
"Lo que pasó, pasó" (with Marta Santos)	2025	—	—	—	—	—	—	—	—	—	—		El camino
"Apágame"	2025	—	—	—	—	—	—	—	—	—	—		El camino
"Adiós" (with Lavinia)	2026	—	—	—	—	—	—	—	—	—	—		Non-album single
"—" denotes a recording that did not chart or was not released in that territory.

== Other appearances ==
Title	Year	Album
"Die schnellste Maus von Mexiko"	2016	Giraffenaffen 5
"Sie lässt mich allein" (Farzin Javadi featuring Álvaro Soler)	2017	Dein Song 2017

=== Songwriter ===
Title	Year	Artist	Album
"Felsenfest"	2015	Wolkenfrei	Wachgeküsst
