= The Best of 2015–2022 =

Studio album by Álvaro Soler
- Released: 26 August 2022
- Length: 63:13
- Label: Airforce1

Álvaro Soler chronology
Magia (2021)	The Best of 2015–2022 (2022)	El Camino (2025)

Singles from Magia
- 1. "Candela" Released: 26 August 2022

The Best of 2015–2022 is the first compilation album by Spanish-German singer Álvaro Soler. It was released on 26 August 2022 by Airforce1 Records.

== Track listing ==
The Best of 2015–2022 track listing
No.	Title	Writer(s)	Producer(s)	Length
1.	"Sofia"	Álvaro Soler; Simon Triebel; Ali Zuckowski; Nadir Khayat; Jakke Erixson	RedOne; T.I. Jakke; Triebel^{[a]}; Zuckowski^{[a]}	3:30
2.	"Solo para ti" (with Topic)	Soler; Triebel; Zuckowski; Tobi Topic; Alexander Tidebrink	Topic	3:18
3.	"Candela" (with Nico Santos)	Soler; Santos; Erixson		2:28
4.	"La cintura"	Soler; Triebel; Zuckowski; Khayat; Erixson	RedOne; Jakke; Triebel^{[a]}; Zuckowski^{[a]}	3:25
5.	"Magia"	Soler; Triebel; Zuckowski; Erixson	Jakke; Triebel^{[a]}; Zuckowski^{[a]}	3:12
6.	"El mismo sol"	Soler; Triebel; Zuckowski	Triebel; Zuckowski	3:00
7.	"La libertad"	Soler; Triebel; Zuckowski; Erixson	Jakke; Tricot^{[a]}	3:16
8.	"A contracorriente" (with David Bisbal)	Soler; Triebel; Zuckowski; Erixson; Bisbal	Jakke; Tricot	3:14
9.	"Manila"	Soler; Ray Dalton; Sebastian Arman; Joacim Persson		2:24
10.	"Yo contigo, tú conmigo (The Gong Gong Song)" (with Morat)	Soler; Triebel; Zuckowski; Juan Pablo Villamil; Juan Pablo Isaza; Simón Vargas; Martín Vargas	Triebel; Zuckowski; David Jürgens^{[a]}	3:00
11.	"Mañana" (featuring Cali y El Dandee)	Soler; Triebel; Zuckowski; Santos; Jürgens; Andrés Torres; Alejandro Rengifo; Mauricio Rengifo	Tricot; Kalli	3:32
12.	"Volar"	Soler; Triebel; Zuckowski	Triebel; Zuckowski	3:00
13.	"Loca"	Soler; Triebel; Zuckowski; Erixson; Rabitt	Jakke; Tricot^{[a]}	3:11
14.	"Si te vas"	Soler; Triebel; Zuckowski; Antonina Armato; Tim James	Rock Mafia; Tricot	2:44
15.	"Animal"	Soler; Triebel; Zuckowski; Rune Westberg	Westberg; Triebel; Zuckowski	3:54
16.	"Ella"	Soler; Triebel; Zuckowski; Chris Chil; Max Alexander Bernard	Tricot	3:33
17.	"Libre" (Italian version with Emma Marrone)	Soler; Triebel; Zuckowski; David Julca; Jonathan Julca; Marrone; Mario Cianchi	Triebel; Zuckowski; Julca Brothers^{[a]}	3:50
18.	"Alma de luz"	Soler; Triebel; Zuckowski	Tricot; Jürgens	2:35
19.	"La cintura" (remix featuring Flo Rida and Tini)	Soler; Triebel; Zuckowski; Khayat; Erixson; Tramar Dillard	RedOne; Jakke; Triebel^{[a]}; Zuckowski^{[a]}	2:58
20.	"El mismo sol (Under the Same Sun)" (with Jennifer Lopez)	Soler; Triebel; Zuckowski; Lopez; Lisa Green; Marcus Lomax; Stefan Johnson; Jordan Johnson; Clarence Coffee, Jr.	The Monsters & Strangerz; Triebel; Zuckowski	3:08
Total length:				63:13

Notes

- ^{^[a]} denotes co-producer(s)

== Charts ==
Weekly chart performance for The Best of 2015–2022
Chart (2021)	Peak position
Austrian Albums (Ö3 Austria)	19
German Albums (Offizielle Top 100)	10
Swiss Albums (Schweizer Hitparade)	8

== Release history ==
The Best of 2015–2022 release history
Region	Date	Format	Label	Ref(s)
Various	26 August 2022	CD; download; streaming	Airforce1 Records	
