= Balas perdidas =

Studio album by Morat
- Released: October 26, 2018
- Recorded: 2017–2018
- Genre: Latin pop
- Producer: Universal Music Spain

Morat chronology
Sobre el amor y sus efectos secundarios (2016)	Balas perdidas (2018)	¿A dónde vamos? (2021)

Balas perdidas (transl. Stray Bullets) is the second studio album by the Colombian band Morat. The album was released on October 26, 2018. The re-issue version was released on May 10, 2019, and includes the song "Presiento" in collaboration with Aitana.

== Background ==
In 2015, Morat began to gain international attention as a result of their 2015 hit single "Mi Nuevo Vicio" in collaboration with Paulina Rubio. The single was certified Platinum.

In 2016, Morat released their first studio album Sobre el amor y sus efectos secundarios. The album was certified 4× Platinum and the band received a Latin Grammy award nomination for "Cómo te atreves".

In 2017, Morat produced the single "Yo Contigo, Tú Conmigo (The Gong Gong Song)" in collaboration with Álvaro Soler as the theme music of Despicable Me 3. The single peaked at No.9 on Billboard on August 19, 2017 and won the "Song of the Year" award in LOS40 Music Awards 2017.

== Composition ==
Juan Pablo Villamil, one of the band's four members, said that they wanted to "do some experimentation" in this album. He described this album as "more of a solid album", saying that it is very different due to their recording experience in one trip to Los Angeles. He believed that in this album "there's more like one sound and it sounds more like an album", unlike the first album, which he thought "the songs sound very different one from another" as "it was recorded song by song throughout many years".

In regards to "No se va", one of the singles in this album, Juan Pablo Villamil admitted that this song is "quite different from the others", describing it as "more of a dancing type of song". He said that they wanted to "do something more upbeat" in this song.

== Release and Promotion ==
On November 3, 2017, Morat released "Besos en guerra" in collaboration with Juanes. On June 8, 2018, 7 months after "Besos en guerra", Morat released the second single of the album, "Cuando nadie ve". On July 6, 2018, the third single of the album, "Punto y aparte", was released. On September 13, 2018, Morat released the fourth single of the album, "El embrujo", in collaboration with Antonio Carmona and Josemi Carmona. Finally, on October 26, 2018, the album was released with the title "Balas perdidas". On the same day, the fifth single of the album, "Yo no merezco volver", was released.

On March 7, 2019, Morat released the sixth single of the album, "No se va", which hit almost 2 million visits on YouTube in less than a week.

On April 4, 2019, Morat performed in San Francisco, kicking off their first-ever US tour, with the title "Balas perdidas" to promote their album. The tour ended in Orlando on May 5, 2019, with performance in other cities such as Los Angeles, Chicago, and New York.

On May 10, 2019, the re-issue of Balas perdidas, Balas perdidas (Edición especial), was released, which includes "Presiento" in collaboration with Aitana and three other songs.

On December 15, 2019, Morat ended their Spain tour with the last performance at the WiZink Center in Madrid. Antonio José, Aitana, Cali y El Dandee, and Cami were also invited to perform at this concert. Up to this show, Morat has held more than 80 concerts in 13 different countries.

== Reception ==
On Billboard, the second single "Cuando nadie ve" peaked at No.1 on August 18, 2018, and the single "Presiento" peaked at No.3 on July 20, 2019.

The single "Presiento" received more than 600,000 streams in Spotify in its first 24 hours. After that period of time, "Presiento" became the song with the highest debut in Spain, with more than 230,000 streams there, beating Rosalía and J Balvin's 2019 track "Con altura".

The album was nominated for the 2019 Latin Grammy Award for Best Contemporary Pop Vocal Album.

== Track listing ==
Balas perdidas
No.	Title	Length
1.	"Otras se pierden"	3:54
2.	"Acuérdate de mí"	3:41
3.	"Besos en guerra" (with Juanes)	3:51
4.	"Cuando el amor se escapa"	2:56
5.	"No se va"	3:36
6.	"Mi vida entera"	3:34
7.	"El embrujo" (feat. Antonio Carmona and Josemi Carmona)	3:58
8.	"Yo no merezco volver"	3:40
9.	"Maldita costumbre"	2:45
10.	"Cuando nadie ve"	3:39
11.	"Punto y aparte"	3:31
12.	"11 besos"	1:58

Balas perdidas (Edición especial)
No.	Title	Length
1.	"Otras se pierden"	3:54
2.	"Acuérdate de mí"	3:41
3.	"Besos en guerra" (with Juanes)	3:51
4.	"Cuando el amor se escapa"	2:56
5.	"No se va"	3:36
6.	"Mi vida entera"	3:34
7.	"El embrujo" (feat. Antonio Carmona and Josemi Carmona)	3:58
8.	"Yo no merezco volver"	3:40
9.	"Maldita costumbre"	2:45
10.	"Cuando nadie ve"	3:39
11.	"Punto y aparte"	3:31
12.	"11 besos"	1:58
13.	"Causa perdida"	3:40
14.	"¿Qué ganas?"	3:32
15.	"Mi suerte"	3:33
16.	"Presiento" (with Aitana)	2:54

== Charts ==
=== Weekly charts ===
Weekly chart performance for Balas perdidas
Chart (2018–2024)	Peak position
Spanish Albums (PROMUSICAE)	1
US Latin Pop Albums (Billboard)	24

=== Year-end charts ===
Year-end chart performance for Balas perdidas
Chart (2018)	Position
Spanish Albums (PROMUSICAE)	58
Chart (2019)	Position
Spanish Albums (PROMUSICAE)	38
Chart (2020)	Position
Spanish Albums (PROMUSICAE)	41
Chart (2021)	Position
Spanish Albums (PROMUSICAE)	92

== Certifications ==
Certifications for "Balas perdidas"
Region	Certification	Certified units/sales
Mexico (AMPROFON)	Diamond+2× Platinum+Gold	450,000^{‡}
Spain (PROMUSICAE)	Platinum	40,000^{‡}
United States (RIAA)	Platinum (Latin)	60,000^{‡}
^{‡} Sales+streaming figures based on certification alone.
