= Sobre el amor y sus efectos secundarios =

Studio album by Morat
- Released: June 17, 2016
- Recorded: 2014–2016
- Genre: Latin pop
- Producer: Universal Music Group

Morat chronology
Sobre el amor y sus efectos secundarios (2016)	Balas perdidas (2018)

Sobre El Amor Y Sus Efectos Secundarios (transl. Regarding Love and Its Side Effects) is the first studio album by the Colombian band Morat. The album was released on June 17, 2016.

== Composition ==
Juan Pablo described this album as a story of songs connecting one after another "that talk about different stages of love that any young person can go through, from the beginning of a relationship to the end, and the feeling of self-esteem of feeling good without that person".

== Promotion ==
On November 29, 2016, Morat performed Sobre el amor y sus efectos secundarios in Bataplan Disco in San Sebastián, Spain, with highlights on "Mi nuevo vicio" and "Cómo te atreves". This performance was organized by Cadena 100 as part of their 'Club 100' meetings. The invitations to attend this performance were sold out in the first day.

On March 9, 2017, Morat presented this album at a concert in Industrial Copera in Granada, Spain.

== Reception ==
The single "Mi Nuevo Vicio" in collaboration with Paulina Rubio achieved great success, and peaked at No.4 on Billboard on June 6, 2015. The third single "Cómo te atreves" also peaked at No.6 on Billboard on February 18, 2017. The song "Aprender A Quererte" is best known in Mexico as the theme song of the soap opera "Hijas de la luna". In addition, Morat obtained 4× Platinum Record as well as a Latin Grammy award nomination for "Cómo te atreves", and Golden Record for "Cuánto me duele".

In collaboration with Álvaro Soler, the single "Yo Contigo, Tú Conmigo (The Gong Gong Song)" was produced as the theme music of Despicable Me 3 in 2017, which was included in the re-issue of Sobre el amor y sus efectos secundarios. The single reached No.1 on radio in Spain and won the "Song of the Year" award in LOS40 Music Awards 2017.

== Track listing ==
First Edition
No.	Title	Length
1.	"Mi nuevo vicio"	3:57
2.	"En un solo día"	3:22
3.	"Aprender a quererte"	3:49
4.	"Yo más te adoro"	3:22
5.	"Di que no te vas"	3:58
6.	"Cómo te atreves"	4:00
7.	"Una vez más"	4:01
8.	"Mil tormentas (with Cali y El Dandee)"	3:53
9.	"Ahora que no puedo hablar"	4:24
10.	"Cuánto me duele"	3:50
11.	"Ya no estás tú"	3:19
12.	"Mi nuevo vicio (with Paulina Rubio)"	4:02

Second Edition
No.	Title	Length
1.	"Mi nuevo vicio"	3:57
2.	"En un solo día"	3:22
3.	"Aprender a quererte"	3:49
4.	"Yo más te adoro"	3:22
5.	"Di que no te vas"	3:58
6.	"Ladrona"	4:16
7.	"Cómo te atreves"	4:00
8.	"Una vez más"	4:01
9.	"Mil tormentas (with Cali y El Dandee)"	3:53
10.	"Ahora que no puedo hablar"	4:24
11.	"Amor con hielo"	3:23
12.	"Cuánto me duele"	3:50
13.	"Ya no estás tú"	3:19
14.	"La última vez"	3:38
15.	"Mi nuevo vicio (with Paulina Rubio)"	4:02

Sobre el amor y sus efectos secundarios... y unas cuantas cosas más (Edición especial)
No.	Title	Length
1.	"Mi nuevo vicio"	3:57
2.	"En un solo día"	3:22
3.	"Aprender a quererte"	3:49
4.	"Yo más te adoro"	3:22
5.	"Di que no te vas"	3:58
6.	"Ladrona"	4:16
7.	"Cómo te atreves"	4:00
8.	"Una vez más"	4:01
9.	"Mil tormentas (with Cali y El Dandee)"	3:53
10.	"Ahora que no puedo hablar"	4:24
11.	"Amor con hielo"	3:23
12.	"Cuánto me duele"	3:50
13.	"Ya no estás tú"	3:19
14.	"La última vez"	3:38
15.	"Del estadio al cielo"	3:54
16.	"Eres tú"	3:25
17.	"Mi nuevo vicio (with Paulina Rubio)"	4:02
18.	"Yo contigo, tú conmigo (The Gong Gong Song) - (with Álvaro Soler)"	2:57
19.	"Cómo te atreves (acoustic)"	3:51

== Charts ==
=== Weekly charts ===
Weekly chart performance for Sobre el amor y sus efectos secundarios
Chart (2016)	Peak position
Spanish Albums (PROMUSICAE)	5

=== Year-end charts ===
Year-end chart performance for Sobre el amor y sus efectos secundarios
Chart (2016)	Position
Spanish Albums (PROMUSICAE)	47
Chart (2017)	Position
Spanish Albums (PROMUSICAE)	29
Chart (2018)	Position
Spanish Albums (PROMUSICAE)	61

== Certifications ==
Region	Certification	Certified units/sales
Mexico (AMPROFON)	Diamond+Gold	330,000^{‡}
Spain (PROMUSICAE)	Gold	20,000^{‡}
United States (RIAA)	Gold (Latin)	30,000^{‡}
^{‡} Sales+streaming figures based on certification alone.
