= No Se Va =

2019 single by Morat

Single by Morat

from the album Balas perdidas
- English title: "Don’t Go"
- Released: 7 March 2019
- Length: 3:36
- Label: Universal Music
- Songwriters: Andrés Torres; Mauricio Rengifo; Morat
- Producers: Andrés Torres; Mauricio Rengifo

Morat singles chronology
"Yo No Merezco Volver" (2018)	"No Se Va" (2019)	"Presiento" (2019)

Music video
- "No Se Va" on YouTube

"No Se Va" (transl. "It Doesn't Go Away") is a song by Colombian band Morat. It was released on 7 March 2019 as the sixth single from their album Balas perdidas (2018). Its official music video was released on the same day. Though it did not chart by its release, it would eventually go viral after a cover of the song published by regional Mexican band Grupo Frontera went viral on TikTok. It reached chart positions in Bolivia and Peru in 2022, as well as later certifications in Mexico, Spain, and the United States.

== Background ==
In an interview with AXS, Juan Pablo Villamil of the band said that "No Se Va" is different from the other songs off their album Balas perdidas, and is more of an upbeat and danceable song.

== Charts ==
Chart performance for "No Se Va"
Chart (2022)	Peak position
Bolivia (Billboard)	11
Peru (Billboard)	19

== Certifications ==
Certifications for "No Se Va"
Region	Certification	Certified units/sales
Mexico (AMPROFON)	Diamond+3× Platinum+Gold	510,000^{‡}
Spain (Promusicae)	Platinum	60,000^{‡}
United States (RIAA)	4× Platinum (Latin)	240,000^{‡}
^{‡} Sales+streaming figures based on certification alone.

== Grupo Frontera version ==
"No Se Va"
- Single and EP cover

Single by Grupo Frontera

from the album El Comienzo
- English title: "It Doesn't Go Away"
- Released: 28 April 2022
- Genre: Norteño cumbia
- Length: 3:13
- Songwriters: Andrés Torres; Mauricio Rengifo; Juan Pablo Isaza; Juan Pablo Villamil; Martin Vargas; Simon Vargas
- Producer: Grupo Frontera

Grupo Frontera singles chronology
"La Plata" (2022)	"No Se Va" (2022)	"No Te Arrepentiras" (2022)

American norteño band Grupo Frontera self-released a live cover of "No Se Va", on 28 April 2022, as the lead single and title track of the EP of the same name (alternatively titled No Se Va (En Vivo)). It follows the band's debut En Vivo, Vol. 1. It is also the lead single and first track from the band's debut studio album El Comienzo (2023), as its lead single and first track.

"No Se Va" began its virality around September 2022, and it led to the song becoming the fifth regional Mexican song to appear on the Billboard Hot 100, peaking at number 57. It also reached chart positions and was trending in several countries.

=== Background and composition ===
In an interview with Billboard, the band said while in the recording process of the No Se Va EP, they wanted to focus on "timeless" pop songs. They also said that they practiced the song for 16 hours before recording it. It is a norteño song, and incorporates elements of Tejano music and cumbias.

The cover song originally became trending on TikTok after a video showing a couple dancing to the song went viral. The song was used in a dance style called "el pasito satevo," and was covered by several users on the platform.

=== Commercial performance ===
Following a surge in popularity, "No Se Va" debuted at number 99 on the Billboard Hot 100, marking the band's first appearance on the chart. It later peaked at number 57 on the chart.

=== Music video ===
Its music video was released on 28 April 2022, which is a live performance. By October 2022, the video reached over 50 million views on YouTube. It would reach 100 million views a month later.

=== Charts ===
==== Weekly charts ====
Weekly chart performance for Grupo Frontera version
Chart (2022–2023)	Peak position
Bolivia (Billboard)	2
Global 200 (Billboard)	31
Mexico (Billboard)	1
US Billboard Hot 100	57
US Hot Latin Songs (Billboard)	3
US Latin Airplay (Billboard)	10
US Regional Mexican Airplay (Billboard)	2

==== Year-end charts ====
Year-end chart performance for Grupo Frontera version
Chart (2023)	Position
Global 200 (Billboard)	141
US Hot Latin Songs (Billboard)	31
