= Agosto (song) =

Single by Álvaro Soler

from the album Eterno agosto
- Released: November 2, 2015
- Length: 2:59
- Label: Airforce1; Universal Music
- Songwriters: Álvaro Soler; Simon Triebel; Ali Zuchowski
- Producers: Simon Triebel; Ali Zuchowski

Álvaro Soler singles chronology
"El mismo sol" (2015)	"Agosto" (2015)	"Sofia" (2016)

"Agosto" (from Spanish: August) is a song by Spanish singer-songwriter Álvaro Soler. It was written by Soler along with Ali Zuchowski and Simon Triebel for his 2015 debut studio album Eterno agosto, while production was helmed by Zuchowski and Triebel. Released as the album's second single in November 2015 following the Europe-wide success of "El mismo sol", the mid-tempo song became his second consecutive song to top the Polish Airplay Top 100 chart. Elsewhere, "Agosto" failed to chart, though it reached number 54 on the Ultratip Bubbling Under in the Flemish Region of Belgium. Its release was accompanied by a lyric video which was released through Soler's YouTube channel.

== Track listing ==
Digital download

1. "Agosto" – 2:59

== Charts ==
Chart (2015)	Peak position
Poland Airplay (ZPAV)	1

== Certifications ==
Region	Certification	Certified units/sales
Poland (ZPAV)	Platinum	20,000^{‡}
^{‡} Sales+streaming figures based on certification alone.
