= Mar de colores =

Studio album by Álvaro Soler
- Released: 7 September 2018
- Genres: Pop; folk
- Length: 56:28
- Labels: Airforce 1; Universal Music
- Producers: B-Case; FNSHRS; T.I. Jakke; David Jürgens; William Larsen; Kalli; George Noriega; RedOne; Stengaard; Tricot

Álvaro Soler chronology
Eterno agosto (2015)	Mar de colores (2018)	Magia (2021)

Singles from Mar de colores
- 1. "La cintura" Released: 29 March 2018; 2. "Loca" Released: 25 January 2019; 3. "La libertad" Released: 10 May 2019

Mar de colores (English: Sea of Colors) is the second studio album by Spanish-German singer-songwriter Álvaro Soler. It was released on 7 September 2018 by Airforce1 Records and Universal Music.

An expanded version of the deluxe edition of the album, subtitled Versión extendida, was released on 10 May 2019. It features three new songs, "Loca", "La libertad" and "Taro".

== Critical reception ==
Professional ratings
Review scores
Source	Rating
Damian Moskal	4.5/5 stars
laut.de	1/5 stars

Laura Hernández from the Spanish radio station Happy FM wrote in a praising review that Mar de Colores features a huge variety of musical registers, and pointed out that in spite of this diversity, Soler has managed to stay true to his identity. In addition, Hernández praised the catchy rhythms and positive messages of Mar de Colores, and its capacity to convey different emotions: "Hence the fitting title of 'Mar de Colores'. This collection of songs showcases the wide range of musical styles that Álvaro Soler possesses. And the best part? He never loses his essence. A simple but meticulously crafted foundation, a catchy rhythm, and a profoundly positive message. You ride the waves of emotion it evokes, but you always return to it to find happiness. There's nothing more beautiful than finding an artist who manages to transmit all those values to an entire generation." In this review, she described the album as "a splendid work" and "a sea of emotions".

In a review published on September 8 2018, one day after its worldwide release, the Polish critic Damian Moskal pointed out that the well-known problem of the "risky sophomore album" definitely didn't affect Soler, and rated the album 4,5 out of 5 stars.

Hannes Huß from laut.de found that the album was suffering from "cliché overload" and added: "Every song feels like a paint-by-numbers exercise, never like an original work of art. As a result, there's no emotional spark while listening — each track just drifts by without leaving a trace. A few rough edges to rub against would have done the music a world of good. As it is, the aftertaste is that of an instant tomato sauce, which has about as much in common with real tomatoes as Alvaro Soler’s music has with summer — or an all-inclusive resort in Ibiza with Spain itself." He rated the album one out of five stars.

== Track listing ==
Mar de colores – Standard edition
No.	Title	Writer(s)	Producers	Length
1.	"La cintura"	Soler; Zuckowski; Erixson; Nadir Khayat; Triebel	Zuckowski; RedOne; Triebel; T.I. Jakke	3:24
2.	"Histérico"	Soler; Zuckowski; Giencarlos Rivera; Jonathan Carlo Rivera; Triebel	Pascal Reinhard; Tricot	2:58
3.	"Te quiero lento"	Soler; Zuckowski; Andrew Wells; Triebel	Wells; Tricot	3:13
4.	"Ella"	Soler; Zuckowski; Cris Chil; Max Bernard; Triebel	Tricot	3:32
5.	"Puebla"	Soler; Zuckowski; Triebel; William Wiik Larsen	Tricot; Larsen	3:10
6.	"Au Au Au"	Soler; Zuckowski; Bruno Valverde; George Noriega; Paul Irizarry; Triebel	Noriega; Tricot	2:50
7.	"Fuego" (feat. Nico Santos)	Soler; Santos; Zuckowski; Andrew Goldstein; Triebel; Tom Peyton	Thomas Stengaard; Tricot	2:58
8.	"Veneno"	Soler; Zuckowski; Triebel	B-Case; Tricot	3:14
9.	"Bonita"	Soler; Zuckowski; Gregori Tauchert Soler; Javi Marinello; Triebel	FNSHRS; Tricot	2:39
10.	"No te vayas"	Soler; Zuckowski; Arbise González; Descemer Bueno; Triebel	David Jürgens; Tricot	2:44
11.	"Niño perdido"	Soler; Zuckowski; Triebel	Tricot	3:08
Total length:				33:50

Bonus tracks
No.	Title	Writer(s)	Producer(s)	Length
12.	"Yo contigo, tú conmigo (The Gong Gong Song)" (with Morat)	Soler; Juan Pablo Isaza; Juan Pablo Villamil; Martin Vargas; Simon Vargas; Zuckowski; Triebel	Zuckowski; David Jürgens; Triebel	2:59
13.	"La cintura (Latin Remix)" (feat. Flo Rida and Tini)	Soler; Tramar Dillard; Zuckowski; Erixson; Khayat; Triebel	Zuckowski; RedOne; Triebel; T.I. Jakke	2:58
14.	"Let It All Go" (with Birdy)	David Rhodes; Jasmine Bogaerde	Rhodes; Birdy	4:40
15.	"Lo mismo" (with Maître Gims)	Gims; Soler; Vianney	Jugglerz; Renaud Rebillaud	3:22
Total length:				47:49

Mar de colores – Versión Extendida
No.	Title	Writer(s)	Producer(s)	Length
1.	"La libertad"	Soler; Ali Zuckowski; Jakke Erixson; Simon Triebel	T.I. Jakke; Tricot	3:12
2.	"Loca"	Soler; Zuckowski; Erixson; Rabitt; Triebel	T.I. Jakke; Tricot	3:10
3.	"La cintura"	Soler; Zuckowski; Erixson; Nadir Khayat; Triebel	Zuckowski; RedOne; Triebel; T.I. Jakke	3:24
4.	"Histérico"	Soler; Zuckowski; Giencarlos Rivera; Jonathan Carlo Rivera; Triebel	Pascal Reinhard; Tricot	2:58
5.	"Te quiero lento"	Soler; Zuckowski; Andrew Wells; Triebel	Wells; Tricot	3:13
6.	"Ella"	Soler; Zuckowski; Cris Chil; Max Bernard; Triebel	Tricot	3:32
7.	"Puebla"	Soler; Zuckowski; Triebel; William Wiik Larsen	Tricot; Larsen	3:10
8.	"Au Au Au"	Soler; Zuckowski; Bruno Valverde; George Noriega; Paul Irizarry; Triebel	Noriega; Tricot	2:50
9.	"Fuego" (feat. Nico Santos)	Soler; Santos; Zuckowski; Andrew Goldstein; Triebel; Tom Peyton	Thomas Stengaard; Tricot	2:58
10.	"Veneno"	Soler; Zuckowski; Triebel	B-Case; Tricot	3:14
11.	"Bonita"	Soler; Zuckowski; Gregori Tauchert Soler; Javi Marinello; Triebel	FNSHRS; Tricot	2:39
12.	"No te vayas"	Soler; Zuckowski; Arbise González; Descemer Bueno; Triebel	David Jürgens; Tricot	2:44
13.	"Niño perdido"	Soler; Zuckowski; Triebel	Tricot	3:08
14.	"Taro"	Soler; Zuckowski; Triebel	Tricot	2:17
15.	"Yo Contigo, Tú Conmigo (The Gong Gong Song)" (with Morat)	Soler; Juan Pablo Isaza; Juan Pablo Villamil; Martin Vargas; Simon Vargas; Zuckowski; Triebel	Zuckowski; David Jürgens; Triebel	2:59
16.	"La cintura (Latin Remix)" (feat. Flo Rida and Tini)	Soler; Tramar Dillard; Zuckowski; Erixson; Khayat; Triebel	Zuckowski; RedOne; Triebel; T.I. Jakke	2:58
17.	"Let It All Go" (with Birdy)	David Rhodes; Jasmine Bogaerde	Rhodes; Birdy	4:40
18.	"Lo mismo" (with Maître Gims)	Gims; Soler; Vianney	Jugglerz; Renaud Rebillaud	3:22
Total length:				56:28

== Charts ==
=== Weekly charts ===
Weekly chart performance for Mar de colores
Chart (2018–19)	Peak position
Austrian Albums (Ö3 Austria)	8
Belgian Albums (Ultratop Flanders)	26
Belgian Albums (Ultratop Wallonia)	167
Czech Albums (ČNS IFPI)	10
Dutch Albums (Album Top 100)	81
French Albums (SNEP)	86
German Albums (Offizielle Top 100)	8
Italian Albums (FIMI)	10
Polish Albums (ZPAV)	2
Spanish Albums (Promusicae)	9
Swiss Albums (Schweizer Hitparade)	4

=== Year-end charts ===
2018 year-end chart performance for Mar de colores
Chart (2018)	Position
Swiss Albums (Schweizer Hitparade)	51

2019 year-end chart performance for Mar de colores
Chart (2019)	Position
Polish Albums (ZPAV)	77

== Certifications ==
Region	Certification	Certified units/sales
Austria (IFPI Austria)	Gold	7,500^{‡}
Germany (BVMI)	Gold	100,000^{‡}
Italy (FIMI)	Gold	25,000^{‡}
Poland (ZPAV)	Platinum	20,000^{‡}
^{‡} Sales+streaming figures based on certification alone.
