= Animal (Álvaro Soler song) =

Single by Álvaro Soler

from the album Eterno agosto
- Released: February 3, 2017
- Length: 3:04
- Label: Airforce1; Universal Music
- Songwriters: Álvaro Soler; Simon Triebel; Rune Westberg; Ali Zuchowski
- Producers: Simon Triebel; Rune Westberg; Ali Zuchowski

Álvaro Soler singles chronology
"Libre" (2016)	"Animal" (2017)	"Yo contigo, tú conmigo" (2017)

"Animal" is a song by Spanish singer-songwriter Álvaro Soler. It was written by Soler, Simon Triebel, Rune Westberg and Rune Westberg for the reissue of his debut studio album Eterno agosto (2015). Production was overseen by Triebel, Westberg, and Zuchowski. Released as the album's fifth and final single in February 2017, it reached number seven on the Polish Airplay Top 100, while peaking at number 22 on the Ultratip Bubbling Under in the Flemish Region of Belgium.

== Track listings ==
Acoustic single
No.	Title	Length
1.	"Animal" (Acoustic Version)	3:39

Remix EP
No.	Title	Length
1.	"Animal" (DJ Katch Remix)	3:35
2.	"Animal" (Nando Pro Remix)	3:52
3.	"Animal" (WBM Remix)	3:40
4.	"Animal" (Calyre Remix)	3:43
5.	"Animal" (Ramon Esteve Remix)	3:05

== Charts ==
Chart (2017–19)	Peak position
Bulgaria (PROPHON)	6
Hungary (Single Top 40)	36
Poland Airplay (ZPAV)	7
Ukraine Airplay (TopHit)	26
