= Mañana (Álvaro Soler and Cali y El Dandee song) =

Single by Álvaro Soler and Cali y El Dandee

from the album Magia
- Released: July 2, 2021
- Length: 3:32
- Label: Triebel & Zuckowski (Sony)
- Songwriters: Alexander Zuckowski; Simon Triebel; David Jürgens; Mauricio Rengifo; Alejandro Rengifo; Álvaro Tauchert Soler; Nico Wellenbrink
- Producers: Tricot; Kalli

Álvaro Soler singles chronology
"Si te vas" (2021)	"Mañana" (2021)	"Non dire una parola" (2021)

Cali y El Dandee singles chronology
"Locura" (2020)	"Mañana" (2021)	"Yo No Te Olvido" (2021)

Music video
- "Mañana" on YouTube

"Mañana" is the third single of Álvaro Soler and Cali y El Dandee from Álvaro Soler album Magia after the title track "Magia" and "Si te vas". The single was released on 2 July 2021. Written by Alexander Zuckowski, Simon Triebel, David Jürgens, Mauricio Rengifo, Alejandro Rengifo, Nico Wellenbrink and the singer himself Álvaro Tauchert Soler, it charted in a number of European charts.

== Track listing ==
1. "Mañana" - Álvaro Soler & Cali y El Dandee - 3:32
2. "Alma de luz" - Alvaro Soler - 2:35

== Charts ==
=== Weekly charts ===
Weekly chart performance for "Mañana"
Chart (2021)	Peak position
Czech Republic Airplay (ČNS IFPI)	36
Germany (GfK)	98
Italy (FIMI)	76
Poland (Polish Airplay Top 100)	43
Russia Airplay (TopHit)	4
San Marino (SMRRTV Top 50)	48
Switzerland (Schweizer Hitparade)	53

=== Year-end charts ===
Year-end chart performance for "Mañana"
Chart (2021)	Position
Russia Airplay (TopHit)	49

== Certifications ==
Certifications for "Mañana"
Region	Certification	Certified units/sales
Spain (PROMUSICAE)	Gold	30,000^{‡}
^{‡} Sales+streaming figures based on certification alone.
