= Loca (Álvaro Soler song) =

Single by Álvaro Soler

from the album Mar de colores
- Language: Spanish
- English title: Crazy
- Released: 25 January 2019
- Recorded: 2019
- Length: 3:11
- Label: Airforce1; Universal Music
- Songwriters: Ali Zuckowski; Álvaro Soler; Jakke Erixson; Rabitt; Simon Triebel
- Producers: T.I. Jakke; tricot

Álvaro Soler singles chronology
"La cintura" (2018)	"Loca" (2019)	"La libertad" (2019)

Music video
- "Loca" on YouTube

"Loca" (English: Crazy) is a song by Spanish singer-songwriter Álvaro Soler. It was released on 25 January 2019 as a non-album single. The song was written by Soler, Ali Zuckowski, Jakke Erixson, Rabitt and Simon Triebel.

== Music video ==
The music video for "Loca" was released on Álvaro Soler's YouTube channel on 25 January 2019. It features Soler singing the song in Tokyo, Japan, a city in which he lived for seven years. As of 8 March 2019, the video has over 9 million views.

== Charts ==
=== Weekly charts ===
Chart (2019)	Peak position
Belgium (Ultratop 50 Flanders)	21
Netherlands (Dutch Top 40)	16
Netherlands (Single Top 100)	57
Poland Airplay (ZPAV)	12
Switzerland (Schweizer Hitparade)	95

=== Year-end charts ===
Chart (2019)	Position
Belgium (Ultratop Flanders)	82
Netherlands (Dutch Top 40)	75

== Certifications ==
Region	Certification	Certified units/sales
Netherlands (NVPI)	Gold	40,000^{‡}
Poland (ZPAV)	Gold	25,000^{‡}
^{‡} Sales+streaming figures based on certification alone.
