= Rompiendo Fronteras =

Studio album by Alejandro Fernández
- Released: February 10, 2017
- Recorded: 2016
- Genres: Latin pop, regional Mexican
- Length: 36:15
- Label: Universal Music Group
- Producers: Áureo Baqueiro, Mario Domm

Alejandro Fernández chronology
Confidencias (2013)	Rompiendo Fronteras (2017)	Hecho en México (2020)

Rompiendo Fronteras ("Breaking borders") is the sixteenth studio album by Mexican singer Alejandro Fernández. It was released on February 10, 2017 under Universal Music Group. The album, Fernández's first in four years, combines the traditional sounds from his earliest repertoire with Latin pop, in particular the collaboration with Colombian band Morat. The album also featured Mexican songwriters Mario Domm and Leonel García. According to AMPROFON, the album sold 60,000 copies in its first week in Mexico, thus certifying it platinum.

== Track listing ==
=== CD ===
No.	Title	Writer(s)	Length
1.	"Quiero que vuelvas"	Joss Favela	2:37
2.	"Tienes que entender"	Leonel García, Gustavo Cuauhtémoc	3:34
3.	"Sé que te duele" (duet with Morat)	Juan Pablo Isaza, Juan Pablo Villamil, Andrés Torres, Mauricio Rengifo	3:48
4.	"Agridulce"	Mario Domm	3:52
5.	"Pude"	Joss Favela	3:00
6.	"Inocente"	Joss Favela	3:06
7.	"En lo correcto"	Joss Favela	2:18
8.	"Cuando más te amaba"	Pablo Preciado	3:27
9.	"No pude"	Fernando Osorio	3:20
10.	"Un beso a medias"	Gianmarco	3:55
11.	"Cuando gane la distancia"	Mónica Vélez, Lauren Evans, Mario Domm	3:18

== Charts ==
=== Weekly charts ===
Weekly chart performance for Rompiendo Fronteras
Chart (2017)	Peak position
Spanish Albums (Promusicae)	1
US Billboard 200	123
US Top Latin Albums (Billboard)	1
US Latin Pop Albums (Billboard)	1

=== Year-end charts ===
Year-end chart performance for Rompiendo Fronteras
Chart (2017)	Position
Spanish Albums (PROMUSICAE)	26
Chart (2018)	Position
Spanish Albums (PROMUSICAE)	93

== Certifications ==
Certifications for Rompiendo Fronteras
Region	Certification	Certified units/sales
Mexico (AMPROFON)	2× Platinum+Gold	150,000^{‡}
Spain (Promusicae)	Gold	20,000^{‡}
^{‡} Sales+streaming figures based on certification alone.
