= La Libertad (song) =

"La libertad"
- Marcus Layton Remix cover

Single by Álvaro Soler

from the album Mar de colores
- Language: Spanish
- English title: The Freedom
- Released: 10 May 2019
- Recorded: 2019
- Length: 3:12
- Label: Airforce1; Universal Music
- Songwriters: Ali Zuckowski; Álvaro Soler; Jakke Erixson; Simon Triebel
- Producers: T.I. Jakke; Tricot

Álvaro Soler singles chronology
"Loca" (2018)	"La libertad" (2019)	"Magia" (2021)

Music video
- "La Libertad" on YouTube

"La libertad" ('Freedom') is a song by Spanish singer-songwriter Álvaro Soler. It was released on 10 May 2019, as the third single from his second studio album, Mar de colores (2018), serving as the second single from its Versión Extendida reissue. The song was written by Soler, Ali Zuckowski, Jakke Erixson and Simon Triebel.

== Music video ==
The music video for "La libertad" was released on Álvaro Soler's YouTube channel on 10 May 2019. As of 10 May 2023, the video has over 54 million views.

== Charts ==
Chart (2019)	Peak position
Austria (Ö3 Austria Top 40)	51
Belgium (Ultratop 50 Flanders)	28
Belgium (Ultratop 50 Wallonia)	28
Czech Republic Airplay (ČNS IFPI)	1
Germany (GfK)	62
Hungary (Rádiós Top 40)	13
Hungary (Single Top 40)	24
Italy (FIMI)	67
Poland Airplay (ZPAV)	18
Puerto Rico (Monitor Latino)	15
San Marino (SMRRTV Top 50)	35
Slovakia Airplay (ČNS IFPI)	4
Slovenia (SloTop50)	9
Switzerland (Schweizer Hitparade)	65

== Certifications ==
Region	Certification	Certified units/sales
Italy (FIMI)	Gold	25,000^{‡}
Poland (ZPAV)	Gold	25,000^{‡}
^{‡} Sales+streaming figures based on certification alone.
