= Magia (Álvaro Soler album) =

Studio album by Álvaro Soler
- Released: 9 July 2021
- Genres: Latin pop; folk pop; pop rock
- Length: 38:04
- Label: Airforce1

Álvaro Soler chronology
Mar de Colores (2018)	Magia (2021)	The Best of 2015–2022 (2022)

Singles from Magia
- 1. "Magia" Released: 5 March 2021; 2. "Si te vas" Released: 21 May 2021; 3. "Mañana" Released: 2 July 2021

Magia (English: Magic) is the third studio album by Spanish-German singer-songwriter Álvaro Soler. It was released on 9 July 2021 by Airforce1 Records and Universal Music.

== Critical reception ==
Professional ratings
Review scores
Source	Rating
WHAT A TUNE	4/5 stars
laut.de	1/5 stars

In a positive review, Xenia Evans from WHAT A TUNE awarded Magia four out of five stars, praising its optimistic atmosphere, Latin American instrumentation and catchy melodies. She described Magia as an album that "radiates summer warmth, hope and infectious optimism". She particularly highlighted "Mañana" as a standout dance floor banger and commended the folk-inspiring closing song "Alma de Luz", describing it as a "beautifully written folk song about people's fear of the foreigners, and the loneliness that comes from an international upbringing".

Dominik Lippe from laut.de wrote about Magia: Even allowing for the compromises inevitably required by the language barrier, the music ultimately reveals a lack of personality. Yet the singer lived in Tokyo for seven years and speaks six languages. Someone who moves so easily between worlds ought to offer more than passing off a flat open-air vibe as intimacy." He rated the album one out of five stars.

== Track listing ==
Magia track listing
No.	Title	Writer(s)	Producer(s)	Length
1.	"Magia"	Álvaro Soler; Simon Triebel; Ali Zuckowski; Jakke Erixson	Jakke; Triebel^{[a]}; Zuckowski^{[a]}	3:11
2.	"Despiertos"	Álvaro Soler; Simon Triebel; Ali Zuckowski; Jakke Erixson	Tricot; David Jürgens; Soler	3:01
3.	"Mañana" (featuring Cali y El Dandee)	Soler; Triebel; Zuckowski; Nico Santos; Jürgens; Andrés Torres; Alejandro Rengifo; Mauricio Rengifo	Tricot; Kalli	3:32
4.	"Tipo normal"	Soler; Triebel; Zuckowski; Antonio Cortés; Servando Primera	Tricot; Kalli	2:50
5.	"Si te vas"	Soler; Triebel; Zuckowski; Antonina Armato; Tim James	Rock Mafia; Tricot	2:44
6.	"Déjala que baile"	Soler; Triebel; Zuckowski; Sofía Lecubarri Ruigómez	Tricot; David Jürgens; Soler	2:40
7.	"Amor para llevar"	Soler; Triebel; Zuckowski; Erixson	Jakke; Triebel^{[a]}; Zuckowski^{[a]}	2:39
8.	"Te busqué"	Soler; Triebel; Zuckowski; Pascal Reinhardt; Cortés; Molly Irvine	Kalli; Tricot^{[a]}	2:45
9.	"En tu piel"	Soler; Triebel; Zuckowski; Reinhardt	Tricot; Jürgens; Soler	4:08
10.	"Hawaii"	Soler; Triebel; Zuckowski; Reinhardt	Tricot; Jürgens; Soler	2:45
11.	"Diferente" (featuring Greg Taro)	Soler; Triebel; Zuckowski; Gregory Tauchert; Ender Thomas; Andrés Castro	Beatgees; Tricot^{[a]}	2:18
12.	"No te entiendo"	Soler; Triebel; Zuckowski; Erixson; Ramon Mañas	Jakke; Tricot	2:52
13.	"Alma de luz"	Soler; Triebel; Zuckowski	Tricot; Jürgens	2:35
Total length:				38:04

== Charts ==
=== Weekly charts ===
Weekly chart performance for Magia
Chart (2021)	Peak position
Austrian Albums (Ö3 Austria)	4
Belgian Albums (Ultratop Flanders)	67
Czech Albums (ČNS IFPI)	25
German Albums (Offizielle Top 100)	3
Italian Albums (FIMI)	32
Polish Albums (ZPAV)	12
Spanish Albums (Promusicae)	29
Swiss Albums (Schweizer Hitparade)	2

=== Year-end charts ===
Year-end chart performance for Magia
Chart (2021)	Position
Swiss Albums (Schweizer Hitparade)	58

== Release history ==
Magia release history
Region	Date	Format	Label	Ref(s)
Various	9 July 2021	CD; download; streaming	Airforce1	
