= El Camino (Álvaro Soler album) =

Studio album by Álvaro Soler
- Released: 10 October 2025
- Length: 39:56
- Labels: Lavadero; Epic

Álvaro Soler chronology
The Best of 2015–2022 (2022)	El Camino (2025)

El Camino (English: The Road) is the fourth studio album by Spanish-German singer-songwriter Álvaro Soler. It was released on 10 October 2025 by Lavadero and Epic Records.

== Critical reception ==
Professional ratings
Review scores
Source	Rating
Musicserver	4/5 stars
laut.de	3/5 stars

Kerstin Kratochwill from laut.de described El Camino as "music that doesn’t hurt anyone – songs that wrap listeners up in a soft beach towel. Objecting to them would be like scolding a puppy for being cute. You can simply acknowledge the record with a smile or ignore it and go whistling on your way." She rated the album three out of five stars. Radio Herne noted that "Soler’s new album brims with personal moments and unexpected sounds from around the world." The Czech website Musicserver called El Camino a successful album, "in which you can discover more and more new elements with each subsequent listen" and stated that "it delivers the perfect soundtrack for your travels", rating the album four out of five stars.

== Commercial performance ==
In Germany, El Camino opened at number 18 on the German Albums Chart, while in Austria, it debuted at 28 on the Austrian Albums Chart. It marked Soler's first album to miss the top ten on both charts. In Switzerland, the album opened at number 62. It was a considerable decline from his previous efforts, all of which had reached the top five of the Swiss Albums Chart. El Camino failed to chart in Spain.

== Track listing ==
El Camino track listing
No.	Title	Writer(s)	Producer(s)	Length
1.	"Intro"			0:19
2.	"Distancia"	Álvaro Tauchert Soler; Guy Nicholas Langley; Lael Bar-Kochva Goldberg	Soler; GXL	2:13
3.	"Apágame"	Soler; David Lemaitre; Michael Burek	Soler; Lemaitre; Burek; Dogukan "Dokii" Yoltay	3:04
4.	"Te imaginaba"	Soler; Andy Clay; Oscarcito; Omar Koonze; Joel Iglesias	Soler; Clay Dokii	2:38
5.	"Santa alegria"	Soler; Lemaitre; Dokii	Soler; Lemaitre; Dokii	2:49
6.	"Regalo"	Soler; Lemaitre; Dokii	Soler; Lemaitre; Dokii	3:05
7.	"Lo que pasó, pasó" (featuring Marta Santos)	Soler; Santos; Antonio Barullo; Pablo Rouss; Joan Josep Monserrat Riutort; Alejandro Manuel Bejarano Lora; Carlos Almazán Fuentes	Soler; Rouss; Dokii; Monserrat	2:42
8.	"Mejor que yo"	Soler; Lemaitre; Dokii	Soler; Lemaitre; Dokii	2:11
9.	"Artificial"	Soler; Rick Parkhouse; George Tizzard	Soler; Lemaitre; Burek	3:22
10.	"Con calma"	Soler; Triebel; Zuckowski; Reinhardt	Soler; Red Triangle; FriendsFromCollege	2:36
11.	"Cero" (featuring Namayana Women's Choir)	Soler; Lemaitre	Soler; Lemaitre; Burek	3:03
12.	"Dicen"	Soler	Soler	2:35
13.	"Buena vida"	Soler; Louis Schoorl; Lemaitre; Nick Bradley	Soler; Schoorl; Lemaitre; Dokii; Bradley	2:43
14.	"Electricidad"	Soler; Jakke Erixson; Lemaitre; Tor Eimon	Soler; Erixson; Lemaitre; Dokii; Eimon	3:01
15.	"Jardín de los recuerdos"	Soler; Marek Pompetzki; Cecil Remmler; Lemaitre; Dokii	Soler; Lemaitre; Dokii	3:19
16.	"Outro"			0:12
Total length:				39:56

== Charts ==
Weekly chart performance for El Camino
Chart (2025)	Peak position
Austrian Albums (Ö3 Austria)	28
German Albums (Offizielle Top 100)	18
Swiss Albums (Schweizer Hitparade)	62

== Release history ==
El Camino release history
Region	Date	Format	Label	Ref(s)
Various	10 October 2025	CD; download; streaming	Lavadero	
