= Eterno agosto =

Studio album by Álvaro Soler
- Released: June 26, 2015
- Length: 40:09
- Label: Airforce 1; Universal Music
- Producer: Simon Triebel

Álvaro Soler chronology
Eterno agosto (2015)	Mar de colores (2018)

Singles from Eterno agosto
- 1. "El mismo sol" Released: April 24, 2015; 2. "Agosto" Released: August 31, 2015; 3. "Sofia" Released: April 8, 2016; 4. "Libre" Released: September 9, 2016; 5. "Animal" Released: February 3, 2017

Eterno agosto (English: Eternal August) is the debut studio album by Spanish singer-songwriter Álvaro Soler, first released on June 26, 2015 by Universal Music. Conceived along with musicians Alexander Zuckowski und Simon Triebel, it was mostly recorded in Berlin and features elements of latin pop and folk pop. Preceded by its number-one hit lead single "El mismo sol," Eterno agosto was released to positive reviews from music critics and became a commercial success, peaking atop the album charts in Italy, Poland, and Switzerland. The album also reached the top ten in Austria and Germany.

A major seller, Eterno agosto was certified Diamond by the Polish Society of the Phonographic Industry (ZPAV) and Platinum by the Federazione Industria Musicale Italiana (FIMI), while reaching gold status in Austria, Germany and Switzerland. The album was reissued in 2016, including a Spanglish version of "El mismo sol" featuring vocals by Jennifer Lopez and its previously unreleased third single "Sofia," produced by RedOne, which became Soler's second number-one hit in Italy and Switzerland.

== Background ==
According to Soler, the title of the album is not meant to suggest that he wishes for an eternal August or an endless summer. In an interview with German website dance-charts.de, he commented: "It's more about the positive feelings that are often associated with summer. You can experience those feelings in winter or at any time of the year, really — I believe it's more of a mindset, a way of approaching life."

== Critical reception ==
Professional ratings
Review scores
Source	Rating
laut.de	1/5 stars
mix1.de	7/8

German newspaper SauerlandKurier found that on Eterno agosto Soler "combines Spanish lyrics with fresh, folkloric melodies. The influences he gathered from around the world are clearly noticeable. Berlin also contributes its typically contemporary vibes. All instruments were recorded live, creating an authentic sound that feels dynamic and organic." Less impressed, Alex Klug from laut.de called Eterno agosto a "total crash between clapping tirades and Casio ukulele sounds. A shower of champagne instead of a waterfall. On top of that, there’s accordion and squeaky trumpets. Incredible what computers can do these days. And here come Marquess, running in from the beach, delighted to meet a real half-Spaniard. Rarely has one been more grateful not to understand Spanish."

== Commercial performance ==
Eterno agosto became a number-one success in Italy, Poland and Switzerland and reached the top ten in Austria and Germany. It reached Gold status in Austria, Germany, and Switzerland, and was eventually certified Platinum by the Federazione Industria Musicale Italiana (FIMI) and Diamond by the Polish Society of the Phonographic Industry (ZPAV) based on sales and streaming figueres in excess of 50,000 and 100,000 units, respectively.""

== Track listing ==
All tracks are written by Simon Triebel, Ali Zuckowski and Álvaro Soler, except where noted; all songs produced by Triebel, except where noted.

Eterno Agosto – Standard edition
No.	Title	Length
1.	"El mismo sol"	2:59
2.	"Tengo un sentimiento"	3:04
3.	"Agosto"	2:59
4.	"Mi corazón"	3:11
5.	"Volar"	3:01
6.	"Esta noche"	2:49
7.	"Esperándote"	3:18
8.	"Lucía"	3:28
9.	"La vida seguirá"	2:47
10.	"Si no te tengo a ti"	2:56
11.	"¿Qué pasa?"	3:12
12.	"¿Cuándo volverás?"	3:18
13.	"El camino"	3:07

Eterno Agosto – Deluxe edition
No.	Title	Producer(s)	Length
14.	"El mismo sol" (featuring Jennifer Lopez)	Triebel; The Monsters and the Strangerz	3:08
15.	"El mismo sol (Under the Same Sun)" (featuring Jennifer Lopez)	Triebel; The Monsters and the Strangerz	3:08

Eterno Agosto – International reissue edition
No.	Title	Writer(s)	Producer(s)	Length
1.	"Sofia"	Triebel; Zuckowski; Soler; Nadir Khayat; Jakke Erixson	RedOne; T.I. Jakke	3:30
2.	"Animal"	Triebel; Zuckowski; Soler; Rune Westberg	Triebel; Zuckowski; Westberg	3:04
3.	"Libre" (featuring Emma Marrone)	Triebel; Zuckowski; Soler; David Julca; Jonathan Julca	Triebel; Zuckowski	3:51
4.	"El mismo sol"			2:59
5.	"Tengo un sentimiento"			3:04
6.	"Agosto"			2:59
7.	"Mi corazón"			3:11
8.	"Volar"			3:01
9.	"Esta noche"			2:49
10.	"Esperándote"			3:18
11.	"Lucía"			3:28
12.	"La vida seguirà"			2:47
13.	"Si no te tengo a ti"			2:56
14.	"Que pasa"			3:12
15.	"Cuando volverás"			3:18
16.	"El camino"			3:07
17.	"El mismo sol" (featuring Jennifer Lopez)		Triebel; The Monsters and the Strangerz	3:08
18.	"El mismo sol (Under the Same Sun)" (featuring Jennifer Lopez)		Triebel; The Monsters and the Strangerz	3:08

== Charts ==
=== Weekly charts ===
Weekly chart performance for Eterno agosto
Chart (2015–17)	Peak position
Austrian Albums (Ö3 Austria)	6
Belgian Albums (Ultratop Flanders)	38
Dutch Albums (Album Top 100)	36
Finnish Albums (Suomen virallinen lista)	43
French Albums (SNEP)	79
German Albums (Offizielle Top 100)	5
Italian Albums (FIMI)	1
Polish Albums (ZPAV)	1
Spanish Albums (PROMUSICAE)	25
Swiss Albums (Schweizer Hitparade)	1

=== Year-end charts ===
2006 year-end chart performance for Eterno agosto
Chart (2016)	Position
Belgian Albums (Ultratop Flanders)	195
Swiss Albums (Schweizer Hitparade)	17

2007 year-end chart performance for Eterno agosto
Chart (2017)	Position
Swiss Albums (Schweizer Hitparade)	39

== Certifications ==
Certifications for Eterno agosto
Region	Certification	Certified units/sales
Austria (IFPI Austria)	Gold	7,500^{*}
Germany (BVMI)	Gold	100,000^{‡}
Italy (FIMI)	Platinum	50,000^{*}
Poland (ZPAV)	Diamond	100,000^{‡}
Switzerland (IFPI Switzerland)	Gold	10,000^{^}
^{*} Sales figures based on certification alone.^{^} Shipments figures based on certification alone.^{‡} Sales+streaming figures based on certification alone.
