= La cintura (song) =

Single by Álvaro Soler

from the album Mar de colores
- Released: 29 March 2018
- Length: 3:25
- Label: Airforce1; Universal Music
- Songwriters: Álvaro Soler; Jakob Erixson; Nadir Khayat; Simon Triebel; Ali Zuchowski
- Producers: T.I. Jakke; RedOne; Simon Triebel; Rune Westberg

Álvaro Soler singles chronology
| "Yo contigo, tú conmigo" (2017) | "La cintura" (2018) | "Loca" (2019) |

Music video
- "La Cintura" on YouTube

"La cintura" (English: The Waist) is a song by Spanish singer-songwriter Álvaro Soler. It was released on 29 March 2018, as the lead single from his second studio album, Mar de colores (2018). A "Latin Remix" featuring Flo Rida and TINI is included in the album as a bonus track. The song was written by Soler, Jakob Erixson, Nadir Khayat, Simon Triebel, and Ali Zuckowski, and produced by T.I. Jakke, RedOne, Zuckowski, and Rune Westberg, all of whom had previously worked on his number-one hit single "Sofia" (2016). The song became a European success, reaching the top 10 in Austria, Belgium, Germany, Italy, Poland, Spain, and Switzerland (number-one in Romandie, the French-speaking part of Switzerland).

== Music video ==
The music video for "La cintura" was released on Álvaro Soler's YouTube channel on 29 March 2018. Shot in Havana, Cuba, it features Soler and a group of people dancing around and having fun. As of May 2021, the video has over 187 million views.

A music video was also released for the remix featuring Flo Rida and TINI on July 26, 2018. Soler filmed scenes with Flo Rida in Miami while TINI filmed her scenes in Madrid. The remix music video has been seen over 123 million times as of March 2023.

== Live performances ==
Álvaro performed the song at Gala 4 during the tenth season of Operación Triunfo (series 10) on October 17, 2018, along with the contestants.

Soler, Flo Rida, and TINI performed the song together at the 4th Annual Latin American Music Awards on October 25, 2018, at the Dolby Theatre in Los Angeles, California.

== Track listings ==
Digital download
| No. | Title | Length |
|---|---|---|
| 1. | "La cintura" | 3:25 |

Digital download – acoustic version
| No. | Title | Length |
|---|---|---|
| 1. | "La cintura (Acoustic Live Version)" | 3:24 |

Digital download – remix version
| No. | Title | Length |
|---|---|---|
| 1. | "La cintura (Remix)" (featuring Flo Rida and TINI) | 2:57 |

== Charts ==
=== Weekly charts ===
Original version
| Chart (2018) | Peak position |
|---|---|
| Argentina (Monitor Latino) | 11 |
| Austria (Ö3 Austria Top 40) | 8 |
| Belarus Airplay (Eurofest) | 13 |
| Belgium (Ultratop 50 Flanders) | 3 |
| Belgium (Ultratop 50 Wallonia) | 3 |
| Colombia (National-Report) | 27 |
| Croatia Airplay (HRT) | 17 |
| Czech Republic Airplay (ČNS IFPI) | 1 |
| Czech Republic Singles Digital (ČNS IFPI) | 38 |
| Denmark (Tracklisten) | 40 |
| Ecuador (National-Report) | 20 |
| Finland (Suomen virallinen lista) | 12 |
| France (SNEP) | 27 |
| Germany (GfK) | 7 |
| Hungary (Dance Top 40) | 3 |
| Hungary (Rádiós Top 40) | 31 |
| Hungary (Single Top 40) | 5 |
| Hungary (Stream Top 40) | 27 |
| Italy (FIMI) | 2 |
| Netherlands (Dutch Top 40) | 7 |
| Netherlands (Single Top 100) | 22 |
| Norway (VG-lista) | 36 |
| Poland Airplay (ZPAV) | 3 |
| Portugal (AFP) | 54 |
| Russia (Tophit) | 3 |
| Slovakia Airplay (ČNS IFPI) | 1 |
| Slovakia Singles Digital (ČNS IFPI) | 23 |
| Slovenia (SloTop50) | 1 |
| Spain (PROMUSICAE) | 3 |
| Sweden (Sverigetopplistan) | 25 |
| Switzerland (Schweizer Hitparade) | 4 |
| Switzerland (Media Control Romandy) | 1 |
| Ukraine Airplay (Tophit) | 64 |
| US Hot Latin Songs (Billboard) | 46 |
| Venezuela (National-Report) | 9 |

Version featuring Flo Rida and TINI
| Chart (2018) | Peak position |
|---|---|
| Argentina (Argentina Hot 100) | 72 |
| Poland Dance (ZPAV) | 4 |

=== Year-end charts ===
| Chart (2018) | Position |
|---|---|
| Austria (Ö3 Austria Top 40) | 28 |
| Argentina (Monitor Latino) | 41 |
| Belgium (Ultratop Flanders) | 19 |
| Belgium (Ultratop Wallonia) | 19 |
| CIS (Tophit) | 33 |
| Germany (Official German Charts) | 28 |
| Hungary (Dance Top 40) | 17 |
| Hungary (Single Top 40) | 95 |
| Italy (FIMI) | 7 |
| Netherlands (Dutch Top 40) | 56 |
| Poland (ZPAV) | 28 |
| Russia Airplay (Tophit) | 25 |
| Slovenia (SloTop50) | 8 |
| Spain (PROMUSICAE) | 11 |
| Switzerland (Schweizer Hitparade) | 7 |
| Chart (2019) | Position |
| CIS (Tophit) | 177 |
| Hungary (Dance Top 40) | 13 |
| Ukraine Airplay (Tophit) | 113 |
| Chart (2020) | Position |
| Hungary (Dance Top 40) | 41 |

== Certifications ==
| Region | Certification | Certified units/sales |
|---|---|---|
| Austria (IFPI Austria) | Platinum | 30,000^{‡} |
| Belgium (BRMA) | Gold | 20,000^{‡} |
| Brazil (Pro-Música Brasil) | Gold | 20,000^{‡} |
| Denmark (IFPI Danmark) | Gold | 45,000^{‡} |
| France (SNEP) | Platinum | 200,000^{‡} |
| Germany (BVMI) | Platinum | 400,000^{‡} |
| Italy (FIMI) | 3× Platinum | 150,000^{‡} |
| Mexico (AMPROFON) | Platinum | 60,000^{‡} |
| Poland (ZPAV) | 2× Platinum | 100,000^{‡} |
| Spain (Promusicae) | 4× Platinum | 240,000^{‡} |
Streaming
| Sweden (GLF) | Platinum | 8,000,000^{†} |
^{‡} Sales+streaming figures based on certification alone.^{†} Streaming-only figures based on certification alone.
