= Libre (Álvaro Soler song) =

Single by Álvaro Soler, ft. Monika Lewczuk

from the album Eterno agosto
- Released: September 9, 2016
- Genre: Latin pop
- Length: 2:59
- Label: Airforce1; Universal Music
- Songwriters: David Julca; Jonathan Julca; Álvaro Soler; Emma Marrone; Simon Triebel; Ali Zuckowski
- Producers: Simon Triebel; Ali Zuckowski

Álvaro Soler singles chronology
"Sofia" (2016)	"Libre" (2016)	"Animal" (2017)

"Libre" (English: Free) is a song by Spanish singer-songwriter Álvaro Soler. It was written by Soler, Ali Zuckowski, Simon Triebel, David Julca, and Jonathan Julca for the international reissue of his debut studio album Eterno agosto (2015) and features guest vocals from Mexican singer Paty Cantú. Production was handled by Zuckowski and Triebel. The pop song was released as the reissue's second and Eterno agosto's overall fourth single in 2016, with Monika Lewczuk and Emma Marrone providing vocals for the Polish and Italian single releases respectively. Another chart success, it became Soler's fourth consecutive song to top the Polish Airplay Top 100 chart and reached the top thirty of the Italian Singles Chart.

== Track listing ==
Digital download (Italian Version)

1. "Libre" (featuring Emma Marrone) – 3:51

== Charts ==
Chart (2016–17)	Peak position
Italy (FIMI)	26
Poland Airplay (ZPAV)	1
Italy (airplay)	3
Italy (airplay TV)	4

== Certifications ==
Region	Certification	Certified units/sales
Italy (FIMI) Italian version	Platinum	50,000^{‡}
Poland (ZPAV)	Platinum	50,000^{‡}
^{‡} Sales+streaming figures based on certification alone.
