= Monika Lewczuk =

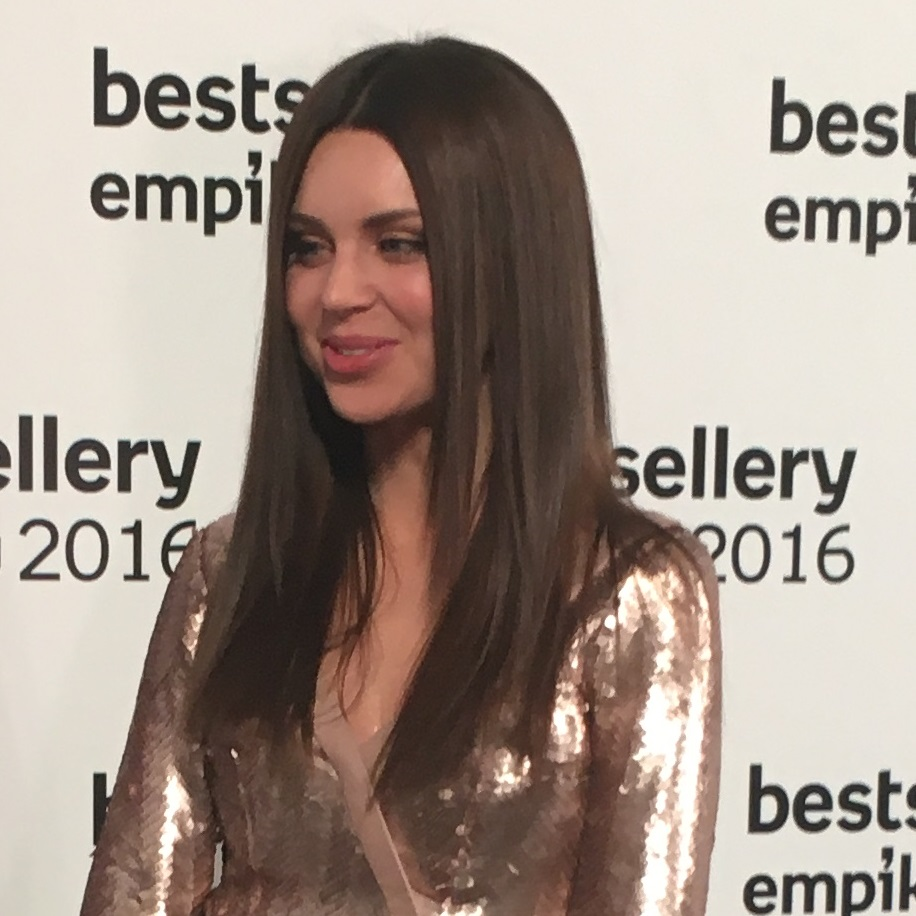
- Lewczuk in 2017
- Born: Monika Lewczuk; 10 June 1988 (age 38); Łomża, Poland
- Occupations: Singer; songwriter; model
- Height: 177 cm (5 ft 9 1/2 in)
- Musical career
- Genres: Pop
- Instrument: Vocals
- Label: Universal Music

Monika Lewczuk (born 10 June 1988) is a Polish singer, songwriter, former model and beauty queen who was crowned Miss Supranational 2011.

== Career ==
=== Early career ===
At the beginning of her career, she worked as a model. She took part in many beauty contests, such as Miss Polski 2009 Miss Globe International 2009, and winning Miss Supranational 2011.

=== 2014–present ===
In 2014, she participated in the fifth season of The Voice of Poland, being a member of Team Marek Piekarczyk. She was dropped in the Battle rounds. Soon after, she signed to Universal Music.

In July 2015, her debut single, "#Tam tam", was released. The song was certified gold by the Polish Society of the Phonographic Industry (ZPAV). Her second single, "Zabiorę cię stąd", was released in second half of the same year and peaked at number eleven on the Polish Airplay Chart.

Her debut studio album #1 was released in June 2016 and was certified gold in Poland by the ZPAV. The singer co-wrote the album with the likes of Rafał Malicki and Sarsa. In the same time, the album's third single, "Ty i Ja", was released. The single reached number three on the Polish Airplay Chart and received a triple platinum certification from the ZPAV. In the summer, artist was nominated for Best Radio Debut at the Eska Music Awards. In the second half of the 2016, she collaborated with Spanish singer Álvaro Soler, recording a song "Libre", which topped the chart in Poland.

== Discography ==
=== Studio albums ===
Title	Album details	Certifications
#1	Released: 17 June 2016; Label: Universal Music Poland; Formats: CD, digital download	ZPAV: Gold

=== EPs ===
Title	EP details
#Być tam	Released: 11 September 2015; Label: Universal Music Poland; Formats: digital download

=== Singles ===
==== As lead artist ====
Title	Year	Peak chart positions	Certifications	Album
Title	Year	POL	Certifications	Album
"#Tam tam"	2015	33	ZPAV: Gold	#1
"Zabiorę cię stąd"	2015	11		#1
"Ty i Ja"	2016	3	ZPAV: 3× Platinum	#1
"Biegnę" (featuring Antek Smykiewicz)	2017	24		#1
"Namieszałeś"	2017	—		Non-album single
"Brak tchu"	2018	—		Non-album single
"Z tobą lub bez ciebie"	2019	—		Non-album single
"Na pół"	2020	—		Non-album single
"Loving on Your Brain"	2020	—		Non-album single
"Pierwszy raz"	2021	—		Non-album single
"Lekko"	2024	—		Non-album single
"To już nie ja"	2024	—		Non-album single
"—" denotes a recording that did not chart or was not released in that territory.

==== As featured artist ====
Title	Year	Peak chart positions	Certifications	Album
Title	Year	POL	Certifications	Album
"Spokój" (2sty featuring Monika Lewczuk)	2014	—		Stej Flaj
"Wild" (FIVER featuring Monika Lewczuk)	2015	—		Non-album single
"Libre" (Álvaro Soler featuring Monika Lewczuk)	2016	1	ZPAV: Platinum	#1
"—" denotes a recording that did not chart or was not released in that territory.

== Awards and nominations ==
Year	Award	Nomination	Work	Result
2016	Eska Music Awards	Best Radio Debut	Herself	Nominated
2017	Eska Music Awards	Best Female Artist	Herself	Nominated
2017	Eska Music Awards	Best Hit	"Ty i Ja"	Nominated
2017	2017 MTV Europe Music Awards	Best Polish Act	Herself	Nominated

Awards and achievements
Preceded by (Panama) Karina Pinilla	Miss Supranational; 2011	Succeeded by (Belarus) Katsiaryna Buraya
Preceded by Anna Jamróz	Miss Supranational Poland; 2011	Succeeded by Agnieszka Karasiewicz
