= Morat (band) =

Colombian folk-pop Band

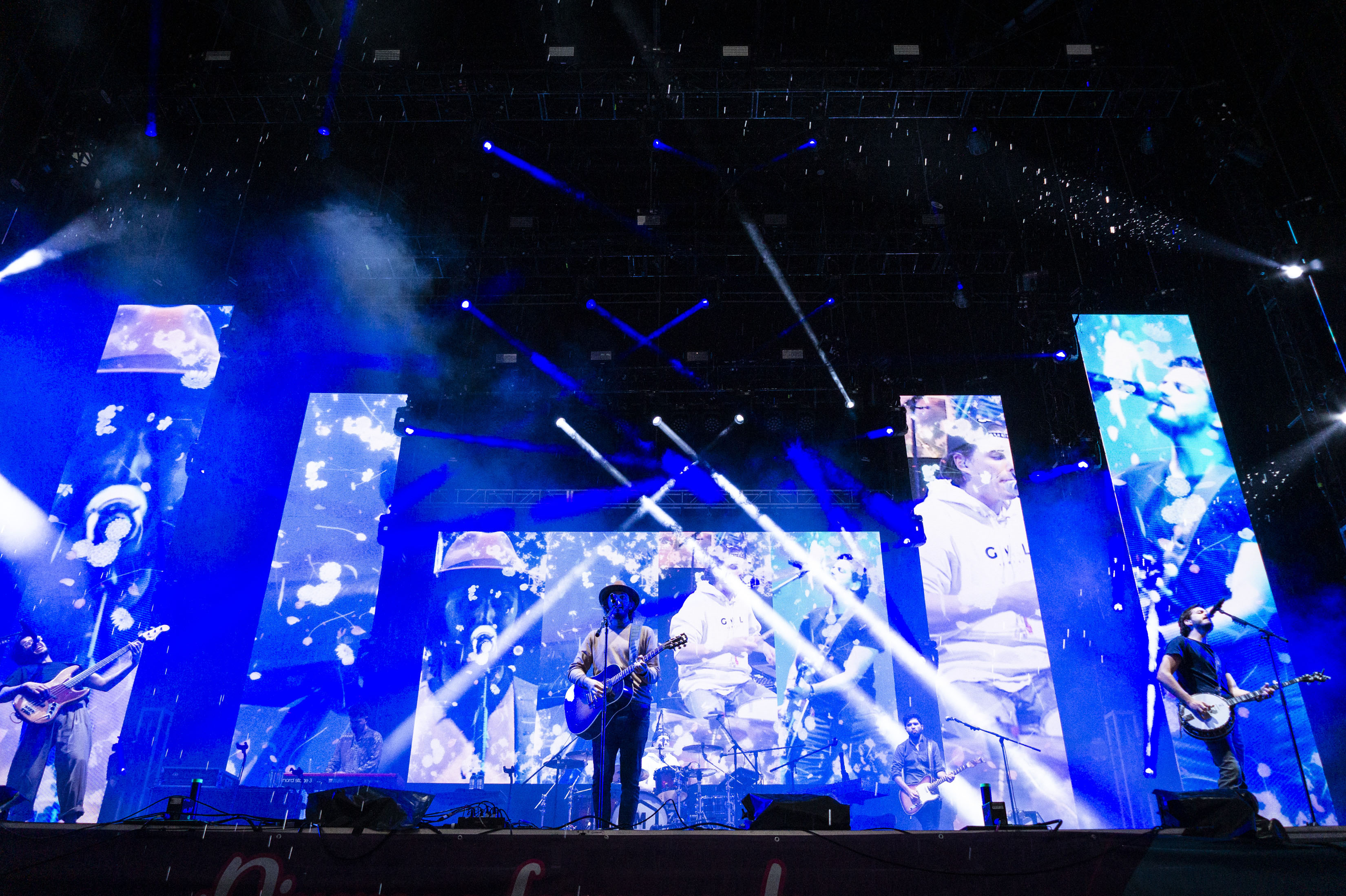

Background information
- Also known as: Malta
- Origin: Bogotá, Colombia
- Genres: Latin pop; Latin folk rock
- Years active: 2015–present
- Label: Universal Music Group
- Members: Juan Pablo Villamil; Juan Pablo Isaza; Simón Vargas; Martín Vargas
- Past members: Alejandro Posada
- Website: www.moratoficial.com

Morat is a Colombian Latin pop rock band formed in the country's capital city, Bogotá. The band is made up of Juan Pablo Isaza (guitars and vocals), Juan Pablo Villamil (banjo and vocals), and the brothers Simón Vargas (bass and choruses) and Martín Vargas (percussion and choirs). Drummer Alejandro Posada was also a founding member of the band, but left in 2016 and was replaced by Martín Vargas.

== History ==
=== Formation ===
The members of Morat have known each other since they were five years old in Colombia and have since shared a love for music. The band was initially formed by Juan Pablo Isaza, Juan Pablo Villamil, Simón Vargas, Martín Vargas, and Alejandro Posada. They all attended the same school so it was easier for them to combine their friendships with music. As teenagers, they began playing the music of their favorite artists in their free time for fun. After high school, they formalized their musical meetings by forming a band. After trying different sounds and genres, they started writing their own songs.

Originally, the band was called "Malta", but years later, they decided to change it to "Morat." This name was born after putting together two ideas: the surname of Alejandro Posada’s family member and the name of the place where they played music for the first time, known as "La Morat." Their inspiration began with their love of Colombian music but expanded to artists such as Joaquín Sabina, the group Bacilos, and the rock band Coldplay.

Juan Pablo Isaza and Juan Pablo Villamil became the vocalists and instrumentalists, while Simón Vargas and Martín Vargas took on bass and percussion. Another percussionist, Alejandro Posada, departed from the band in 2016.

=== 2014–2017: Sobre el amor y sus efectos secundarios ===
Morat saw their first turning point when the singer Paulina Rubio showed interest in their composition "Mi Nuevo Vicio" and wanted them to turn it into a single. In 2015, it was released under the collaboration of Paulina Rubio and Morat, achieving international success. The single rose to No.12 on the Billboard Latin Pop Airplay chart, and reached No.1 in Spain. The single was also certified Platinum Record.

At the end of 2015, they received another international success with the new single, "Cómo te atreves", topping iTunes and bringing them to fame in Spain. In June 2016, Morat released their first studio album Sobre el amor y sus efectos secundarios through Universal Music Spain. The album debuted at No.1 in several Hispanic countries, including Colombia, Mexico and Spain. The album was certified 4× Platinum, and the band received a Latin Grammy award nomination for "Cómo te atreves". After the release of this album, Alejandro Posada left the band and was replaced by Simón Vargas' brother Martín.

In 2017, Morat produced the single "Yo Contigo, Tú Conmigo" in collaboration with Álvaro Soler as the theme music of Despicable Me 3. The single peaked at No.9 on Billboard on 19 August 2017 and won the "Song of the Year" award in LOS40 Music Awards 2017. This single was later included in the re-issue of Sobre el amor y sus efectos secundarios, which also contains the acoustic version of "Cómo te atreves".

=== 2017–2019: Balas perdidas ===
In 2018, Morat released their second studio album, Balas perdidas. The single "Cuando nadie ve" peaked at No.1 on Billboard on 18 August 2018, and the single "No se va", released on 7 March 2019, hit almost 2 million visits on YouTube in less than a week.

Following the release, Morat kicked off their first US tour to promote their album in 2019, with the first performance in San Francisco on 4 April 2019. The tour ended in Orlando on 5 May 2019, with performances in other cities such as Los Angeles, Chicago, and New York.

In April 2019, Morat released a song with Aitana called "Presiento". "Presiento" was later included in the re-issue of Balas perdidas, Balas perdidas (Edición especial), on 10 May 2019, together with three other songs.

On 15 December 2019, Morat ended their Spain tour with the last performance at the WiZink Center in Madrid. Antonio José, Aitana, Cali y El Dandee, and Cami were also invited to perform at this concert. Up to this show, Morat had held more than 80 concerts in 13 countries.

=== 2019–2021: ¿A dónde vamos? ===
On 13 December 2019, Morat released the single "Enamórate de alguien más", the second single from their third album cycle (following the title track).

On 6 March 2020, Morat released "No Termino", the third single and the first of 2020. On 2 April, "Nunca te olvide", the fourth single was released. On 22 May, "Bajo la mesa", along with Sebastián Yatra, was released, the fifth single from the third album and the first collaboration. On 11 June, the band released a collaboration with Reik titled "La Bella y la Bestia." On 30 July they released "Más de lo que aposté"—their second collaboration with Aitana—and on 6 August they released "Labios Rotos", which is a tribute to the Mexican band Zoé.

On 7 November, after more than 5 months without playing on stage, Morat played a virtual concert through Rappi called "Echando un cuento." On 13 November, "Al aire" was released, the sixth single from their third album, with its respective music video, which was recorded in the municipality of Guasca, Cundinamarca. On 3 June 2021, they released a collaboration with Danna Paola. On 15 July 2021, Morat released their third studio album, ¿A dónde vamos?. The album was influenced by the band's experience during the COVID-19 pandemic.

=== 2022–present: Si ayer fuera hoy ===
On November 4, 2022, Morat released their fourth studio album, Si ayer fuera hoy. It was inspired by nostalgic songs from the early 2000s for its characteristic folk-pop style, which captivated millions of listeners around the world. They began their new tour that covered cities in Latin America and Europe, the Si Ayer Fuera Hoy Tour. In 2023, they announced a stadium tour called Los Estadios Tour, which was closed through Disney Plus.

At the beginning of 2025, their new song “Cuarto de Hotel” became part of the film El secreto del orfebre by Mario Casas. In March, they collaborated for the first time with Camilo creating "Me toca a mí". This was the start of their upcoming and 5th album titled M5 which was expected to the end of 2025.

== Members ==
=== Current ===
==== Juan Pablo Isaza Piñeros – songwriter, guitar, piano, ukulele, lead vocals ====
He was born on August 9, 1994, in Bogotá, Colombia. From his childhood, he cultivated his love for music by learning to play multiple instruments such as guitar and piano. Years later he studied music production allowing him in the future to become the main composer and be of great help in the formation of the band's sound. As a composer, among his most outstanding creations are: "Cómo te atreves", "Besós en guerra" y "No término". He has also collaborated in the writing of songs for singers such as Sebastián Yatra and Aitana.

==== Juan Pablo Villamil Cortez – banjo, lead vocals, guitar, songwriter ====
He was born on September 1, 1994, in Bogotá, Colombia. Before devoting himself fully to music, he pursued a career in engineering. He has stood out as the vocalist of the band and has made a great contribution by adding the banjo to the musical themes, which is an unusual instrument in Latin American songs. Together with Isaza's voice, he has transmitted warmth and love to their songs, creating a great impact on her audience and Spanish-speaking music. In addition, he has helped in the composition of some of the band's songs and has stood out as a literary writer by publishing his first book “Las canciones que no escribimos”.

==== Simón Vargas Morales – bass guitar, backup vocals, songwriter ====
He was born on October 24, 1993, in Bogotá, Colombia. He is Morat's bassist and backing vocalist, known for his energetic stage presence. Beyond bass, he co-writes songs, contributing ideas and lyrics that shape the band's emotionally driven music. Like Villamil, he has a deep love for literature, reflected in his published novel titled A la orilla de la Luz. Among the band's members, he maintains the most active presence on social media, engaging closely with fans.

==== Martín Vargas Morales – percussion, backup vocals ====
He was born on July 25, 1996 in Bogotá, Colombia. He joined the band in 2016 just after Alejandro Posada's departure, becoming the youngest member. Before being part of Morat, I studied music while playing drums in local bands. His drumming gives life to Morat's signature sound after mixing folk, pop, and Latin music. In addition to being a drummer and percussionist, he often contributes vocals by constantly adding different sounds to songs.

=== Past Members ===
==== Alejandro Posada – percussion, backup vocals (2011–2016) ====
Alejandro Posada was one of the founding members of Morat and the original drummer. However, in 2016, he decided to leave the band to focus on personal projects and other professional opportunities. His departure made Martín Vargas the new drummer of Morat. Despite leaving the group, Posada remains close friends with the band members.

== Discography ==
=== Studio albums ===
List of studio albums, with selected chart positions and certifications
Title	Album details	Peak chart positions		Certifications
Title	Album details	MEX	SPA	Certifications
Sobre el amor y sus efectos secundarios	Released: 17 June 2016; Label: Universal Music Spain; Formats: CD, digital download	—	5	AMPROFON: Diamond+Gold; PROMUSICAE: Gold; RIAA: Gold (Latin)
Balas perdidas	Released: 26 October 2018; Label: Universal Music Spain; Formats: CD, digital download	1	1	AMPROFON: Diamond+2× Platinum+Gold; PROMUSICAE: Platinum; RIAA: Platinum (Latin)
¿A dónde vamos?	Released: 16 July 2021; Label: Universal Music Spain; Formats: CD, digital download	—	1	AMPROFON: 2× Platinum; PROMUSICAE: Gold; RIAA: Gold (Latin)
Si ayer fuera hoy	Released: 4 November 2022; Label: Universal Music Spain; Formats: CD, digital download	—	2	PROMUSICAE: Gold; RIAA: Gold (Latin)

=== Extended plays ===
List of extended plays with selected details
Title	Extended play details
Grabado en Madera	Released: 24 July 2015; Label: Universal Music Spain; Format: Digital downloading

=== Singles ===
==== As lead artist ====
List of singles as lead artist, with selected chart positions and certifications, showing year released and album name
Title	Year	Peak chart positions							Certifications	Album
Title	Year	COL	ARG	ECU	ITA	MEX	POL	SPA	Certifications	Album
"Cuánto me duele"	2015	—	—	—	—	—	—	53	PROMUSICAE: Gold	Sobre el amor y sus efectos secundarios
"Cómo te atreves"	2015	—	—	—	—	23	—	2	AMPROFON: 2× Platinum; PROMUSICAE: 5× Platinum; RIAA: Platinum (Latin)	Sobre el amor y sus efectos secundarios
"Del estadio al cielo"	2016	—	—	—	—	—	—	—		Sobre el amor y sus efectos secundarios
"Amor con hielo"	2017	—	—	16	—	24	—	50	AMPROFON: Gold; PROMUSICAE: Gold	Sobre el amor y sus efectos secundarios
"Yo contigo, tú conmigo" (with Álvaro Soler)	2017	—	—	76	29	—	15	18	FIMI: Platinum; PROMUSICAE: Platinum	Sobre el amor y sus efectos secundarios... y unas cuantas cosas más (Edición especial) and Mar de Colores
"Besos en guerra" (with Juanes)	2017	78	—	2	—	34	—	22	AMPROFON: 4× Platinum; PROMUSICAE: 2× Platinum; RIAA: Platinum (Latin)	Balas perdidas
"Para que nadie se entere"	2018	—	—	—	—	—	—	—		Non-album singles
"Antes de los veinte"	2018	—	—	—	—	—	—	—		Non-album singles
"¿A dónde vamos a parar?" (with Paty Cantú)	2018	—	—	—	—	—	—	—		Non-album singles
"La correcta" (with Nabález)	2018	—	—	—	—	—	—	42		Non-album singles
"Cuando nadie ve"	2018	—	43	—	—	2	—	21	AMPROFON: 4× Platinum; PROMUSICAE: 2× Platinum; RIAA: Platinum (Latin)	Balas perdidas
"Punto y aparte"	2018	—	—	—	—	—	—	—	AMPROFON: Platinum	Balas perdidas
"Una y otra vez" (with Santiago Cruz)	2018	59	85	—	—	—	—	—		Elementales
"El embrujo" (feat. Antonio Carmona & Josemi Carmona)	2018	—	—	—	—	—	—	—	AMPROFON: Gold	Balas perdidas
"Yo no merezco volver"	2018	—	—	—	—	—	—	88		Balas perdidas
"No se va"	2019	—	—	—	—	—	—	—	AMPROFON: Diamond+3× Platinum+Gold; PROMUSICAE: Platinum; RIAA: 4× Platinum (Latin)	Balas perdidas
"Presiento" (with Aitana)	2019	—	—	—	—	10	—	9	AMPROFON: Platinum; PROMUSICAE: 2× Platinum	Balas perdidas (Edición especial)
"Déjame ir" (with Andrés Cepeda)	2019	16	—	—	—	—	—	—		Non-album singles
"Mejores amigos" (with Yera)	2019	—	—	—	—	—	—	—		Non-album singles
"A dónde vamos"	2019	—	—	—	—	—	—	31	PROMUSICAE: Platinum	¿A Donde Vamos?
"Enamórate de alguien más"	2019	—	—	15	—	—	—	61		¿A Donde Vamos?
"No termino"	2020	—	—	13	—	—	—	83		¿A Donde Vamos?
"Nunca te olvidé"	2020	—	—	—	—	—	—	72		¿A Donde Vamos?
"Princesas"	2020	—	—	—	—	—	—	—		Non-album singles
"Bajo la mesa" (with Sebastián Yatra)	2020	—	—	—	—	—	—	52		¿A Donde Vamos?
"La bella y la bestia" (with Reik)	2020	—	78	—	—	—	—	—	* AMPROFON: Gold	¿A Donde Vamos?
"506" (with Juanes)	2022	—	—	—	—	—	—	77		Si Ayer Fuera Hoy
"Salir Con Vida" (with Feid)	2022	—	—	—	—	—	—	39		Si Ayer Fuera Hoy

==== As featured artist ====
List of singles as featured artist, with selected chart positions and certifications, showing year released and album name
Title	Year	Peak chart positions							Certifications	Album
Title	Year	COL	ARG	ECU	MEX	SPA	US Latin	VEN	Certifications	Album
"Mi nuevo vicio" (Paulina Rubio feat. Morat)	2015	—	—	—	22	2	—	—	AMPROFON: Gold; PROMUSICAE: 2× Platinum	Deseo and Sobre el amor y sus efectos secundarios
"Sé que te duele" (Alejandro Fernández feat. Morat)	2017	25	—	1	2	29	49	—	AMPROFON: 2× Platinum; PROMUSICAE: Platinum	Rompiendo Fronteras
"Consejo de Amor" (TINI feat. Morat)	2018	—	33	65	—	—	—	58	CUD: Gold	Quiero Volver
"Más de lo que aposté" (Aitana feat. Morat)	2020	—	—	—	—	21	—	—	PROMUSICAE: Gold	Non-album single

== Awards and nominations ==
Latin Grammy Award
Year	Nominee / Work	Award	Result	Ref.
2016	Morat	Best New Artist	Nominated	
2019	Balas perdidas	Best Contemporary Pop Vocal Album	Nominated	
2025	Ya Es Mañana	Best Pop/Rock Album	Won	

LOS40 Music Awards
Year	Nominee / Work	Award	Result	Ref.
2016	Morat	New Artist of the Year	Won	
2016	"Cómo Te Atreves"	Song of the Year	Nominated	
2016	Morat	Lo + 40 Artist Award	Nominated	
2017	"Yo Contigo, Tú Conmigo" (with Álvaro Soler)	Song of the Year	Won	
2018	Morat	Best Latin Artist	Won	
2019	Morat	Del 40 al 1 Artist Award	Nominated	
