= Magia (Álvaro Soler song) =

Single by Álvaro Soler

from the album Magia
- Released: 5 March 2021
- Genre: Folk pop
- Length: 3:12
- Label: Triebel & Zuckowski (Sony)
- Songwriters: Alexander Zuckowski; Simon Triebel; Jakke Erixson; Álvaro Tauchert Soler
- Producer: T.I. Jakke

Álvaro Soler singles chronology
"La libertad" (2019)	"Magia" (2021)	"Si te vas" (2021)

Music video
- "Magia" on YouTube

"Magia" is the first single of Álvaro Soler from his similarly titled album Magia. The single was released on 5 March 2021. Written by Alexander Zuckowski, Simon Triebel, Jakke Erixson and the singer himself Álvaro Tauchert Soler, it charted in a number of European charts.

== Charts ==
=== Weekly charts ===
Weekly chart performance for "Magia"
Chart (2021)	Peak position
Austria (Ö3 Austria Top 40)	21
Belgium (Ultratop 50 Flanders)	18
Belgium (Ultratop 50 Wallonia)	12
Finland (Suomen virallinen radiolista)	6
Germany (GfK)	28
Italy (FIMI)	57
Poland (Polish Airplay Top 100)	13
San Marino (SMRRTV Top 50)	22
Slovakia Airplay (ČNS IFPI)	9
Spain (PROMUSICAE)	100
Switzerland (Schweizer Hitparade)	29

=== Year-end charts ===
Year-end chart performance for "Magia"
Chart (2021)	Position
Belgium (Ultratop Flanders)	79
Belgium (Ultratop Wallonia)	93
Germany (Official German Charts)	76
Poland (ZPAV)	76

== Certifications ==
Certifications for "Magia"
Region	Certification	Certified units/sales
Austria (IFPI Austria)	Gold	15,000^{‡}
Germany (BVMI)	Gold	200,000^{‡}
Italy (FIMI)	Gold	35,000^{‡}
Spain (PROMUSICAE)	Platinum	60,000^{‡}
^{‡} Sales+streaming figures based on certification alone.
