= Sofia (Álvaro Soler song) =

Single by Álvaro Soler

from the album Eterno agosto
- Released: April 15, 2016
- Genre: Folk pop; Latin pop
- Length: 3:30
- Label: Airforce 1, Universal Music, Sony
- Songwriters: Simon Triebel; Ali Zuckowski; Nadir Khayat; Jakke Erixson; Álvaro Tauchert Soler
- Producers: RedOne; T.I. Jakke

Álvaro Soler singles chronology
"Agosto" (2015)	"Sofia" (2016)	"Libre" (2016)

Music video
- "Sofia" on YouTube

"Sofia" is a single by Spanish singer-songwriter Álvaro Soler. The song was released as a separate single after "El mismo sol" and "Agosto". "Sofia" was not included in Soler's original debut album, Eterno agosto, in 2015, nor in the 2015 Italian and Spanish deluxe editions, but it did appear on the album's international edition and its Italian reissue, both in 2016.

The song was a hit in Italy first, climbing in three weeks after release to the top of the FIMI chart and the Italian Airplay chart. It proved to be a pan-European and international hit, peaking at No 9 on the French Singles Chart in September 2016. The music video was shot in Havana, Cuba. The single went eight times platinum in Italy and two times platinum in Spain.

== Formats and track listings ==
Digital download

1. "Sofia" – 3:30

CD single

1. "Sofia" – 3:30
2. "Volar" – 3:01

Remix

1. "Sofia" (B-Case Remix) – 3:16
2. "Sofia" (Oovee Remix) – 3:44
3. "Sofia" (Robin Grubert Remix) – 3:21

== Charts ==
=== Weekly charts ===
Chart (2016–2018)	Peak position
Austria (Ö3 Austria Top 40)	3
Belgium (Ultratop 50 Flanders)	1
Belgium (Ultratop 50 Wallonia)	16
Czech Republic Airplay (ČNS IFPI)	1
Czech Republic Singles Digital (ČNS IFPI)	19
Ecuador (National-Report)	3
Finland (Suomen virallinen lista)	15
France (SNEP)	9
Germany (GfK)	23
Hungary (Dance Top 40)	2
Hungary (Rádiós Top 40)	2
Hungary (Single Top 40)	2
Italy (FIMI)	1
Italy Airplay (EarOne)	1
Netherlands (Dutch Top 40)	11
Netherlands (Single Top 100)	19
Poland Airplay (ZPAV)	1
Poland Dance (ZPAV)	2
Slovakia Airplay (ČNS IFPI)	1
Slovakia Singles Digital (ČNS IFPI)	15
Slovenia (SloTop50)	5
Spain (Promusicae)	3
Switzerland (Schweizer Hitparade)	1

=== Year-end charts ===
Chart (2016)	Position
Austria (Ö3 Austria Top 40)	28
Belgium (Ultratop Flanders)	34
Germany (Official German Charts)	80
Hungary (Dance Top 40)	88
Hungary (Single Top 40)	24
Italy (Federazione Industria Musicale Italiana)	3
Netherlands (Dutch Top 40)	50
Netherlands (Single Top 100)	78
Poland (ZPAV)	18
Slovenia (SloTop50)	38
Spain (PROMUSICAE)	36
Switzerland (Schweizer Hitparade)	11
Chart (2017)	Position
Hungary (Dance Top 40)	2
Hungary (Rádiós Top 40)	94
Hungary (Single Top 40)	9
Slovenia (SloTop50)	18
Switzerland (Schweizer Hitparade)	63
Chart (2018)	Position
Hungary (Dance Top 40)	7
Hungary (Single Top 40)	97
Chart (2019)	Position
Hungary (Dance Top 40)	21
Chart (2020)	Position
Hungary (Dance Top 40)	44
Chart (2021)	Position
Hungary (Dance Top 40)	49
Chart (2022)	Position
Hungary (Dance Top 40)	40
Chart (2023)	Position
Hungary (Dance Top 40)	52
Chart (2024)	Position
Hungary (Dance Top 40)	66
Chart (2025)	Position
Hungary (Dance Top 40)	67

== Certifications ==
Region	Certification	Certified units/sales
Austria (IFPI Austria)	Platinum	30,000^{‡}
Belgium (BRMA)	Platinum	20,000^{‡}
Denmark (IFPI Danmark)	Gold	45,000^{‡}
France (SNEP)	Platinum	200,000^{‡}
Germany (BVMI)	3× Gold	600,000^{‡}
Italy (FIMI)	8× Platinum	400,000^{‡}
Netherlands (NVPI)	Platinum	40,000^{‡}
Poland (ZPAV)	Diamond	100,000^{‡}
Spain (Promusicae)	3× Platinum	180,000^{‡}
Switzerland (IFPI Switzerland)	2× Platinum	60,000^{‡}
^{‡} Sales+streaming figures based on certification alone.
