= El mismo sol =

2015 single by Álvaro Soler

Single by Álvaro Soler

from the album Eterno agosto
- Released: April 24, 2015
- Length: 2:59
- Label: Airforce1; Universal Music
- Songwriters: Simon Triebel; Ali Zuckowski; Álvaro Tauchert Soler
- Producers: Simon Triebel; Ali Zuckowski

Álvaro Soler singles chronology
"El mismo sol" (2015)	"Agosto" (2015)

Music video
- "El Mismo Sol" on YouTube

"El mismo sol" (English: The Same Sun) is the debut single by Spanish singer-songwriter Álvaro Soler. It was written by Soler along with Simon Triebel and Ali Zuchowski for his debut studio album Eterno agosto (2015). The song was recorded in Berlin where Soler resides and was published first on the personal YouTube channel of the singer. Based on the success of the video, Soler was signed to Universal Music and the single made available on iTunes on May 8, 2015, serving as his debut.

An instant success, "El mismo sol" became one of the summer hits of 2015. It peaked atop the Italian, Polish, and Swiss Singles Charts and reached top thirty on the majority of the charts it appeared on. After the success of the original version in Spanish, a special Spanglish version was released for the US and UK markets featuring additional lyrics in English and vocals by American entertainer Jennifer Lopez. This version charted in various Billboard charts and peaked at number one on the Billboard's Latin Airplay chart for the week of December 19, 2015. Lopez also invited Soler to perform the song together at iHeart Radio event in 2015.

In mid-2016, yet another version featuring Jennifer Lopez was made available as "El mismo sol (Under The Same Sun)".

== Music video ==
A music video of the song was released April 24, 2015, on the singer's Vevo channel. The video follows the adventures of the singer, exploring various cities and landscapes on his motorcycle or going backpacking in nature or relating to various people. The scenes were shot in various locations in Andalusia, Frigiliana, Málaga, Guadix and Tabernas Desert. The lyrics convey an intense will to enjoy and love life, have fun, and travel.

== Track listing ==
Digital download

1. "El Mismo Sol" – 2:59

CD single

1. "El Mismo Sol" – 3:00
2. "El Mismo Sol" (Radio edit) – 3:08

Remix EP

1. "El Mismo Sol" (Moonboy Inc Remix) – 3:05
2. "El Mismo Sol" (Why So Loco Club Remix) – 5:45
3. "El Mismo Sol" (Why So Loco Remix) – 3:34
4. "El Mismo Sol" (Colorido Remix) – 3:07
5. "El Mismo Sol" (Supermans Feinde Remix) – 3:14
6. "El Mismo Sol" (Jan Leyk Remix) – 3:32

DJ Ross & Max Savietto Remix

1. "El Mismo Sol" (DJ Ross & Max Savietto Remix) – 2:53

== Charts ==
=== Weekly charts ===
Chart (2015)	Peak position
Austria (Ö3 Austria Top 40)	6
Belgium (Ultratop 50 Flanders)	8
Belgium (Ultratop 50 Wallonia)	9
France (SNEP)	31
Germany (GfK)	20
Hungary (Single Top 40)	27
Italy (FIMI)	1
Mexico Top 20 Inglés (Monitor Latino)	7
Netherlands (Dutch Top 40)	12
Netherlands (Single Top 100)	16
Poland Airplay (ZPAV)	1
Poland Dance (ZPAV)	1
Russia Airplay (Tophit)	132
Slovakia Airplay (ČNS IFPI)	4
Slovenia (SloTop50)	12
Spain (Promusicae)	6
Switzerland (Schweizer Hitparade)	1
Switzerland (Media Control Romandy)	3

=== Year-end charts ===
Chart (2015)	Position
Austria (Ö3 Austria Top 40)	50
Belgium (Ultratop Flanders)	45
Germany (Official German Charts)	91
Italy (FIMI)	6
Netherlands (Dutch Top 40)	56
Netherlands (Single Top 100)	91
Poland (ZPAV)	25
Spain (PROMUSICAE)	55
Switzerland (Schweizer Hitparade)	26

Chart (2016)	Position
Spain (PROMUSICAE)	74

== Certifications ==
Region	Certification	Certified units/sales
Austria (IFPI Austria)	Gold	15,000^{‡}
Belgium (BRMA)	Gold	15,000^{*}
Germany (BVMI)	Gold	200,000^{‡}
Italy (FIMI)	6× Platinum	300,000^{‡}
Netherlands (NVPI)	Gold	15,000^{‡}
Poland (ZPAV)	3× Platinum	60,000^{‡}
Spain (Promusicae)	2× Platinum	80,000^{‡}
Switzerland (IFPI Switzerland)	Platinum	30,000^{‡}
^{*} Sales figures based on certification alone.^{‡} Sales+streaming figures based on certification alone.

== Álvaro Soler featuring Jennifer Lopez version ==
"El Mismo Sol / El Mismo Sol (Under the Same Sun)"

Single by Álvaro Soler featuring Jennifer Lopez
- Released: August 21, 2015
- Genre: Latin
- Length: 3:08
- Label: Airforce1 Records, Universal Music
- Songwriters: Simon Triebel; Ali Zuchowski; Álvaro Tauchert Soler; Jordan Johnson; Jennifer Lopez; Marcus Lomax; Lisa Greene; Stefan Johnson; Clarence Coffee
- Producers: Simon Triebel; The Monsters and the Strangerz

Álvaro Soler singles chronology
"El Mismo Sol / El Mismo Sol (Under the Same Sun)" (2015)	"Agosto" (2015)

Jennifer Lopez singles chronology
"Back It Up" (2015)	"El Mismo Sol" (2015)	"Try Me" (2015)

Music video
- "El Mismo Sol (Under The Same Sun) [B-Case Remix]" on YouTube

During her 46th birthday party on July 25 at 1 OAK Southampton club, American singer and actress Jennifer Lopez premiered a special new version of the song with her vocals. This Spanglish version serves as the international version to launch the song into the American and British market.

"El mismo sol" with the extra vocals of Jennifer Lopez and a Spanglish version of the song titled "El mismo sol (Under the Same Sun)" was released on August 21, 2015.

=== Music video ===
The official music video of "El mismo sol (Under the Same Sun)" was shot in Brooklyn in August 2015, but is yet to be released. A lyric video of the song was released on October 30, 2015, on Soler's Vevo channel.

On January 15, 2016, however, a music video of the new remix version of the song entitled El Mismo Sol (Under The Same Sun) [B-Case Remix] was released through Álvaro Soler's Vevo channel.

=== Live performances ===
Soler and Lopez first performed "El mismo sol (Under the Same Sun)" during Lopez' set at the iHeartRadio Music Festival on September 19, 2015. They performed again the song at the iHeartRadio Fiesta Latina on November 8, 2015.

=== Track listing ===
CD single: "El Mismo Sol (Under the Same Sun)"

1. "El Mismo Sol" feat. Jennifer Lopez – 3:08
2. "El Mismo Sol (Under the Same Sun)" feat. Jennifer Lopez – 3:07
3. "El Mismo Sol" – 3:00
4. "El Mismo Sol" (Radio edit) – 3:08

Digital download: "El Mismo Sol (Under the Same Sun)"

1. "El Mismo Sol" feat. Jennifer Lopez – 3:08
2. "El Mismo Sol (Under the Same Sun)" feat. Jennifer Lopez – 3:07

=== Charts and certifications ===
==== Charts ====
Chart (2015–16)	Peak position
Finland Download (Latauslista)	5
Mexico Espanol Airplay (Billboard)	24
Mexico Top 20 Inglés (Monitor Latino)	1
US Hot Latin Songs (Billboard) remix	11
US Latin Airplay (Billboard) remix	1
US Latin Pop Airplay (Billboard) remix	3

==== Year-end charts ====
Chart (2016)	Position
US Hot Latin Songs (Billboard)	97

== See also ==
- List of Billboard number-one Latin songs of 2015
