= LOS40 Music Awards 2017 =

Spanish music awards ceremony

- Date: November 10, 2017
- Location: WiZink Center
- Presented by: Los 40
- Hosted by: Santi Millán
- Website: los40.com/tag/los40_music_awards/a/

Television/radio coverage
- Network: Divinity

The LOS40 Music Awards 2017 were the twelfth edition of the LOS40 Music Awards, the annual awards organized by Spanish radio station Los 40. It was held on November 10, 2017 in the WiZink Center in Madrid, Spain.

== Performances ==
Artist(s)	Song(s)
Luis Fonsi	"Despacito"
Leiva	"La llamada"
Camila Cabello	"Havana"
Malú	"Invisible"
Thirty Seconds to Mars	"Walk on Water"
Pablo Alborán	"Saturno" "No vaya a ser"
Portugal. The Man	"Feel It Still"
Rag'n'Bone Man	"Skin" "Human"
Morat; Álvaro Soler	"Yo contigo, tú conmigo"
Alejandro Sanz	"¿Lo ves?"
Anne-Marie	"Ciao Adios" "Rockabye"
Vanesa Martín; Leiva	"Complicidad"
C. Tangana	"Mala mujer"
Kygo	"Stargazing" (with Justin Jesso) "Firestone" (with Conrad Sewell)

== Awards and nominations ==
The nominations were revealed on September 14, 2017.

=== Artist of the Year ===
- David Bisbal
- Dani Martín
- Leiva
- Vanesa Martín
- Manuel Carrasco

=== New Artist of the Year ===
- Bombai
- Blas Cantó
- Taburete
- C. Tangana
- Bromas Aparte

=== Album of the Year ===
- David Bisbal - Hijos del mar
- Vanesa Martín - Munay
- David Otero - David Otero
- Joaquín Sabina - Lo niego todo
- Taburete - Dr. Charas

=== Song of the Year ===
- Bombai feat. Bebe - Solo si es contigo
- Leiva - La lluvia en los zapatos
- Álvaro Soler & Morat - Yo contigo, tú conmigo
- Vanesa Martín - Complicidad
- David Bisbal - Antes que no

=== Video of the Year ===
- David Bisbal - Antes que no
- Leiva - La lluvia en los zapatos
- C. Tangana - Mala mujer
- Blas Cantó - In Your Bed
- Various artists - Y, ¿si fuera ella?

=== International Artist of the Year ===
- Ed Sheeran
- Shawn Mendes
- Kygo
- Bruno Mars
- Charlie Puth

=== International New Artist of the Year ===
- Rag'n'Bone Man
- Kaleo
- Julia Michaels
- Harry Styles
- Bebe Rexha

=== International Album of the Year ===
- Ed Sheeran - ÷
- Harry Styles - Harry Styles
- Calvin Harris - Funk Wav Bounces Vol. 1
- Bruno Mars - 24K Magic
- Imagine Dragons - Evolve

=== International Song of the Year ===
- Ed Sheeran - Shape of You
- Luis Fonsi & Daddy Yankee feat. Justin Bieber - Despacito
- Clean Bandit feat. Sean Paul & Anne-Marie - Rockabye
- Rag'n'Bone Man - Human
- The Chainsmokers & Coldplay - Something Just Like This

=== International Video of the Year ===
- Katy Perry feat. Skip Marley - Chained to the Rhythm
- Ed Sheeran - Shape of You
- Kygo & Selena Gomez - It Ain't Me
- Luis Fonsi feat. Daddy Yankee - Despacito
- Bruno Mars - That's What I Like

=== Best Latin Artist ===
- J Balvin
- Shakira
- Maluma
- Luis Fonsi
- Juanes

=== Tour of the Year ===
- Bruno Mars - 24K Magic World Tour
- Ed Sheeran - ÷ Tour
- Leiva - Gira Monstruos
- U2 - The Joshua Tree Tour 2017
- Maluma - Pretty Boy Dirty Boy World Tour

=== Lo + 40 Artist Award ===
- Ariana Grande
- Charlie Puth
- Harry Styles
- Camila Cabello
- Shawn Mendes

=== LOS40 Trending Artist Award ===
- L.A.
- Arcade Fire
- Rayden
- Monarchy
- The xx

=== Golden Music Awards ===
- U2
- Alejandro Sanz
- Luis Fonsi & Daddy Yankee feat. Justin Bieber - Despacito

=== LOS40 Global Show Award ===
- Luis Fonsi feat. Daddy Yankee - Despacito
- Maluma - Felices los 4
- Shakira - Me enamoré
- J Balvin & Willy William - Mi gente
- Enrique Iglesias feat. Descemer Bueno & Zion & Lennox - Súbeme la radio

=== LOS40 Blackjack Artist Award ===
- Sofi Tukker
- Royal Blood
- Haim
- Portugal. The Man
- Bleachers
