= Yo contigo, tú conmigo (The Gong Gong Song) =

"Yo Contigo, Tú Conmigo (The Gong Gong Song)"

Single by Morat and Álvaro Soler
- Released: June 16, 2017
- Length: 2:59
- Label: Universal Music

"Yo Contigo, Tú Conmigo (The Gong Gong Song)" ([ˈɟʝo konˈtiɣo ˈtu komˈmiɣo], "me with you, you with me") is a single by Colombian band Morat and the Spanish singer-songwriter Álvaro Soler. The single was produced as the theme song for the film Despicable Me 3, and was released on June 16, 2017. It won the "Song of the Year" award at the LOS40 Music Awards 2017.

== Charts ==
Weekly chart performance for "Yo contigo, tú conmigo"
Chart (2017)	Peak position
Italy (FIMI)	29
Spain (Promusicae)	18

=== Year-end charts ===
2017 year-end chart performance for "Yo contigo, tú conmigo"
Chart (2017)	Position
Spain (PROMUSICAE)	60

== Certifications ==
Region	Certification	Certified units/sales
Italy (FIMI)	Platinum	50,000^{‡}
Spain (Promusicae)	Platinum	40,000^{‡}
^{‡} Sales+streaming figures based on certification alone.
