= Álvaro Soler =

Spanish pop singer (born 1991)

Álvaro Soler Alvaro Tauchert Soler
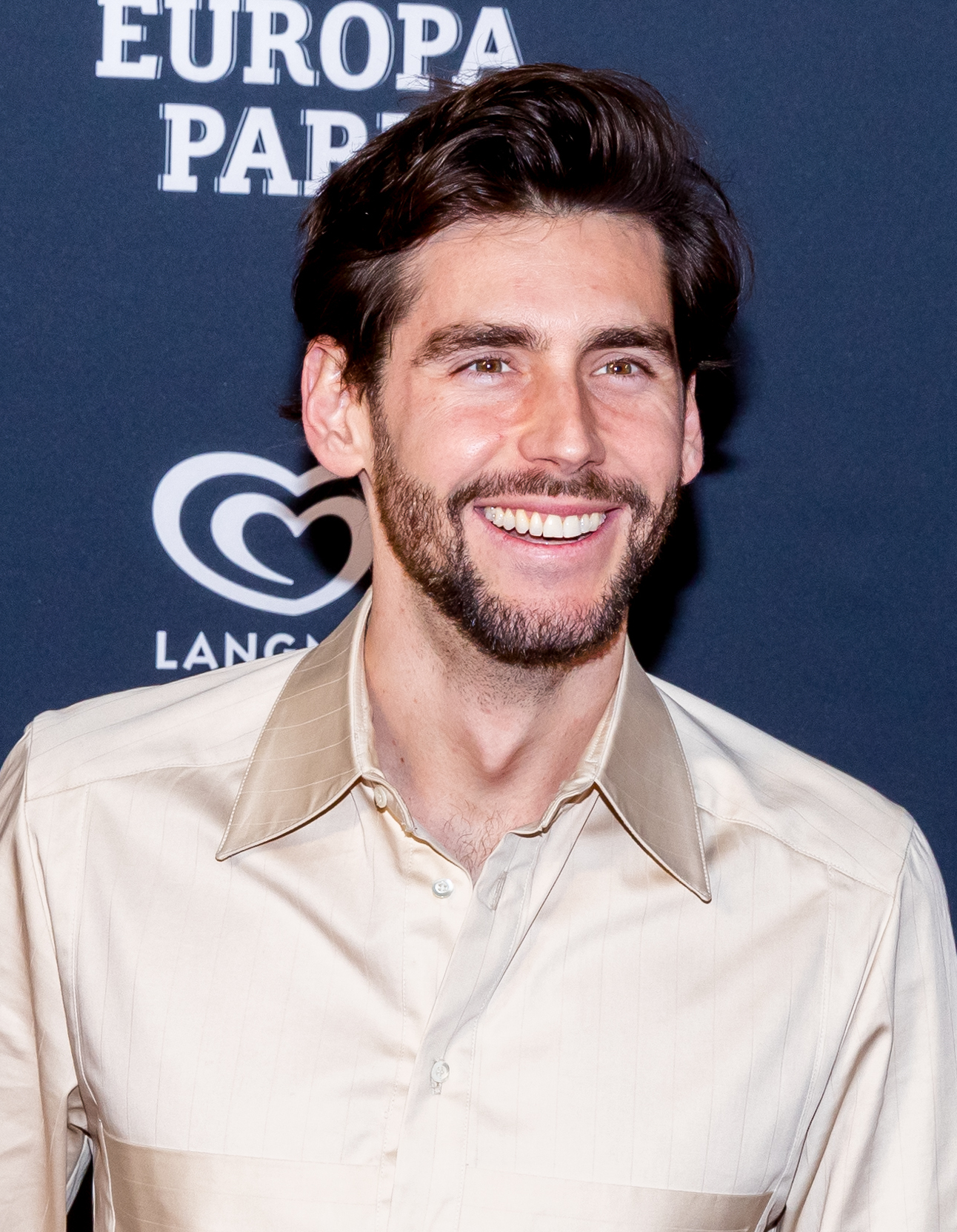
- Soler in 2024

Background information
- Born: Alvaro Tauchert Soler; 9 January 1991 (age 35); Sant Cugat del Vallès, Catalonia, Spain
- Origin: Barcelona, Catalonia, Spain
- Genres: Latin pop; folk pop
- Occupations: Singer; songwriter
- Years active: 2015–present
- Labels: Universal; Sony
- Spouse: Melanie Kroll (m. 2023)
- Website: alvarosoler.com

Álvaro Tauchert Soler (Note: Spanish: [ˈalβaɾo soˈleɾ], Catalan: [suˈle]; German: [ˈtaʊxɐt]) (Note: In this Spanish name, the first or paternal surname is Tauchert and the second or maternal family name is Soler.) (born 9 January 1991) is a Spanish-German singer. He rose to prominence across Europe and Latin America with his 2015 hit "El mismo sol", primarily achieving success in Italy, Switzerland and Mexico. A special bilingual Spanish-English version of "El mismo sol", featuring Jennifer Lopez, was also recorded for international release in the United States, in the United Kingdom, and worldwide. His follow up single "Sofia" in 2016 also achieved chart success in European countries, reaching number 1 in Poland, Italy, the Czech Republic, Slovakia, Belgium and Switzerland; and it is the most-viewed video on his YouTube channel. Soler has released four studio albums, Eterno agosto in 2015, Mar de colores in 2018, Magia in 2021 and El camino in 2025. His single "La cintura" taken from his second album has become a pan-European hit for him.

== Early life ==
Born in Sant Cugat del Vallès to a German father and to a Spanish-Belgian mother, he became multilingual at a young age. He moved with his parents to Japan at age 10, staying there until age 17. He took piano lessons very early there.

== Career ==
Returning to Barcelona, in 2010 he established the musical band Urban Lights alongside his brother and some friends. The band continued performing music described as a mixture of British pop, indie pop and electronic music, building a following locally. They won a university music contest and the band appeared in 2013 on the Spanish music casting contest ¡Tú sí que vales! reaching the Final 8. They released some materials and self-produced albums. Soler also pursued studies in industrial design at Escuela de Grafismo Elisava.

Soler decided to drop the Urban Lights band in 2014 to go solo, establishing himself as a musical artist based in Germany. Based in Berlin, he released his single "El mismo sol" co-written by Soler, Yasmin Gabriel, Ali Zuckowski, Simon Triebel and John Speaks (from the band Juli) and produced by Triebel. The song, released on 24 April 2015, initially became a huge hit in Italy, reaching number one on the Italian FIMI and certified double platinum. It also made it to number one on the Swiss Hitparade singles chart.

Based on this success, Soler released his debut solo album Eterno agosto on 23 June 2015 with Universal Music. In 2016, Soler was chosen as a judge on the tenth series of the Italian talent show X Factor. Alongside being nominated for awards, Soler performed his recently released single on the Latin American Music Awards on 6 October 2016 alongside Mexican actress/singer Lucero.

Soler released a version of his song "Libre" in 3 language versions with Mexican singer Paty Cantú, Polish singer Monika Lewczuk and Italian singer Emma Marrone. He also collaborated with Morat, performing in the song "Yo contigo, tú conmigo" for the film Despicable Me 3. The videoclip was released on 16 June 2017.

Soler was also the voice of Camilo Madrigal in the Italian and German-dubbed versions of the 2021 Disney film Encanto. Soler was featured as a coach on The Voice Kids from season 9 (2021) to season 12 (2024), and again in season 14 (2026).

== Personal life ==
Soler is a polyglot and speaks Catalan, Spanish, German, English, Italian, French and Japanese.

Soler had a five-year long relationship with British-Spanish singer Sofia Ellar. On 23 May 2023, he married German model Melanie Kroll (born 1998). The couple have a daughter, born in July 2024.

== Discography ==
Studio albums

- Eterno agosto (2015)
- Mar de colores (2018)
- Magia (2021)
- El Camino (2025)

== Filmography ==
Year	Title	Role	Notes	Ref.
2021	Encanto	Camilo Madrigal	Feature film; German- and Italian-language dubbing versions	

== Awards and nominations ==
Year	Award	Nomination	Work	Result
2015	Los Premios 40 Principales	Best Spanish New Artist	—N/a	Won
2016	European Border Breakers Award	Best Emerging Artist – Spain	—N/a	Won
2016	MTV Europe Music Awards	Best Spanish Act	—N/a	Nominated
2016	Latin American Music Awards	Xfinity New Artist of the Year	—N/a	Nominated
2016	Latin American Music Awards	Favorite Pop/Rock New Artist	—N/a	Nominated
2016	Latin American Music Awards	Favorite Pop/Rock Song	"El mismo sol" (featuring Jennifer Lopez)	Nominated
2017	Die Eins der Besten	Video-Hit of the Year	"Sofia"	Won
2017	Swiss Music Awards	Best Breaking Act International	—N/a	Won
2017	LOS40 Music Awards	Song of the Year	"Yo contigo, tú conmigo" (with Morat)	Won
2018	LOS40 Music Awards	Artist of the Year	—N/a	Nominated
2018	LOS40 Music Awards	Video of the Year	"La cintura"	Nominated
2019	Die Eins der Besten	Hit of the Year	"La cintura"	Won
2021	MTV Europe Music Awards	Best German Act	—N/a	Nominated
