= Cuarto Azul World Tour =

2026 concert tour by Aitana

- Tour by Aitana
- Location: Europe; North America; Latin America
- Associated album: Cuarto azul
- Start date: May 9, 2026
- End date: February 20, 2027
- Legs: 4
- No. of shows: 42
- Supporting acts: Alexia Naomi; Candu Dominguez; Chiara Oliver; Gale; Gara Duran; Ganges; Luzía; Olivia Wald
- Producer: Global Talent Services; Live Nation

Aitana concert chronology
- Metamorfosis Season (2025); Cuarto Azul World Tour (2026-2027)

The Cuarto Azul World Tour (also known as the Cuarto Azul Aitana World Tour) is the fourth concert tour by Spanish singer-songwriter Aitana, in support of her fourth studio album, Cuarto Azul. Led by Global Talent Services, the tour was officially announced on July 31, 2025. The tour began on May 9, 2026, at Estadio Municipal Antonio Peroles in Roquetas de Mar and will conclude on February 20, 2027 in Paris, consisting of 42 shows.

== Background ==
Aitana released her fourth studio album Cuarto azul on May 30, 2025. The electropop album became Aitana's first major LP release after Alpha. It was a commercial success, debuting with 7.5 million streams on its first day, including 4.9 million in Spain alone.

On July 31, 2025, at the end of her concert as part of the Metamorfosis Season mini-tour, Aitana announced her new Cuarto Azul World Tour and revealed a list of 24 cities across Europe and America that she will visit in 2026. Confirmed stops include Madrid, Barcelona, Mexico City, Buenos Aires, Miami, London and Paris, among others. A dedicated page was launched on her official website where fans can register to receive updates and gain early access to ticket sales. Aitana revealed the first confirmed dates on October 13, 2025.

On April 7, 2026, Aitana announced new dates in Latin America, North America, and Europe.

On September 1, 2026, Aitana announced Gale, Ganges, and Luzía as opening acts in Barcelona, and Chiara Oliver, Gale and Gara Durán in Madrid. Alexia Naomi was later announced for the Santiago show.

== Critical reception ==
Billboard’s Franchesca Guims praised the opening night of Aitana’s show in Almería, highlighting its ambitious production, emotional storytelling and immersive stage design. El País, in a review by Carlos Pérez de Ziriza, described Aitana’s Roig Arena concert in Valencia as a "flawless and highly competent show", highlighting her artistic progression, strong stage production and the emotional connection with a predominantly female audience.

== Commercial performance ==
=== Ticket sales ===
After all available presale tickets sold out on October 20, new dates in Barcelona and Madrid were announced due to high demand. Later, on October 23, after the general sale for the Spanish dates had sold out, additional shows were added in Barcelona, Bilbao, Madrid, Seville, and Valencia.

On April 18, 2026, following the general sale, a second date in Buenos Aires was added due to high demand. Later, on April 25, a second Mexico City date was added after the first one sold out within minutes. On August, new dates in Mexico City and Buenos Aires were added due to high demand. On November 5, 2026, a second date in London was added due to demand.

== Set list ==
This set list is from the May 9, 2026, concert in Roquetas de Mar. It is not intended to represent all concerts for the tour.

1. "6 de febrero"
2. "Segundo intento"
3. "Duele un montón despedirme de ti"
4. "+ (Más)"
5. "No te has ido y ya te extraño"
6. "Trankis"
7. "Cuarto azul"
8. "Cuando hables con él"
9. "Los ángeles"
10. "Miamor" (includes elements of Britney Spears' "Toxic")
11. "AQYNE"
12. "24 Rosas"
13. "Gran Vía"
14. "Desde que ya no hablamos"
15. "Música en el cielo"
16. "Vas a quedarte"
17. "Formentera"
18. "Mon amour"
19. "Las babys"
20. "En el centro de la cama"
21. "Ex ex ex"
22. "Lia"
23. "La chica perfecta"
24. "Conexión psíquica"

Encore

25. "Superestrella" (includes elements of Rihanna and Calvin Harris' "We Found Love")

=== Notes ===
- During the second show in Valencia, Aitana performed an acoustic snippet of "Con La Miel En Los Labios" after "Gran Vía".
- During the first show in Sevilla, Aitana performed an acoustic snippet of "Con La Miel En Los Labios" after "Gran Vía".
- During the second show in Sevilla, Aitana performed "= (Igual)" after "Gran Vía".
- Durante the show in Calvià, "+ (Más)", "No te has ido y ya te extraño", "24 Rosas", "Desde que ya no hablamos", "Música en el cielo", "Formentera", "Ex Ex Ex" or "Lia" were not performed. However Aitana, performed a snippet of "Con La Miel En Los Labios" after "Gran Vía".
- During the show in Fuengirola, "24 Rosas" was not performed. However Aitana, performed a snippet of "= (Igual)" after "Gran Vía".
- During the show in Las Palmas, "No te has ido y ya te extraño", "Cuarto azul", "24 rosas", "Desde que ya no hablamos", "Música en el cielo", "Formentera", "Ex Ex Ex", "Lia" and "La chica perfecta" were not performed.
- During the show in Cádiz, Aitana performed "= (Igual)" after "Gran Vía".
- Starting on July 18, "Formentera" was removed from the set list.
- During the show in Bogotá, "24 rosas", "Las Babys", "Ex Ex Ex", and "La chica perfecta" were not performed.
- During the second show in Buenos Aires, Aitana performed "Con la miel en los labios" after "Gran Vía".
- During the third show in Buenos Aires, Aitana performed "Si no vas a volver" after "Gran Vía".
- Starting on October 28, "Las Babys" was removed from the set list.
- During the shows in Monterrey, Zapopan and Querétaro, "La chica perfecta" was not performed.

=== Special guests ===
- July 4: Aitana performed "Gran Vía" with Quevedo.
- September 11: Aitana performed "Duele un montón despedirme de ti" with Jay Wheeler.
- September 14: Aitana performed "Cuando hables con él" with Chiara Oliver.
- October 22: Aitana performed "Trankis” with Barry B.

== Dates ==
List of 2026 concerts
Date (2026)	City	Country	Venue	Opening act	Attendance	Revenue
May 9	Roquetas de Mar	Spain	Estadio Municipal Antonio Peroles	—N/a	16,778 / 16,778	$1,392,752
May 15	Murcia	Spain	Plaza de Toros	—N/a	8,344 / 8,344	$777,077
May 21	Valencia	Spain	Roig Arena	—N/a	32,096 / 32,096	$2,454,514
May 22	Valencia	Spain	Roig Arena	—N/a	32,096 / 32,096	$2,454,514
May 29	Albacete	Spain	Estadio José Copete	—N/a	13,359 / 13,359	$1,119,902
June 4	Seville	Spain	Plaza de España	—N/a	33,837 / 33,837	$2,565,168
June 5	Seville	Spain	Plaza de España	—N/a	33,837 / 33,837	$2,565,168
June 13 (Note: The concert on June at the Mallorca Live in Calviá, is part of the Mallorca Live Fest.)	Calvià (Note: Labelled as Palma de Mallorca in promotional material.)	Spain	Mallorca Live	—N/a	—N/a	
June 19	Fuengirola	Spain	Recinto Marenostrum-Sohail Castle	—N/a	17,024 / 17,024	$1,296,873
June 26	Avilés	Spain	Exterior Pabellón de la Magdalena	—N/a	18,962 / 18,962	$1,486,589
July 4 (Note: The concert on July 4 at the Gran Canaria Stadium in Las Palmas, is part of the Granca Live Fest.)	Las Palmas	Spain	Gran Canaria Stadium	—N/a	38,000 / 38,000	—N/a
July 10	Zaragoza	Spain	Pabellón Príncipe Felipe	—N/a	7,699 / 7,699	$634,305
July 12	Cádiz	Spain	Nuevo Mirandilla	—N/a	23,071 / 23,071	$1,824,671
July 18	Úbeda	Spain	Recinto Ferial	—N/a	10,706 / 10,706	$861,941
July 22	A Coruña	Spain	Coliseum	—N/a	7,537 / 7,537	$654,000
September 4	Barcelona	Spain	Palau Sant Jordi	Gale	—	—
September 5	Barcelona	Spain	Palau Sant Jordi	Gale	—	—
September 7	Barcelona	Spain	Palau Sant Jordi	Ganges	—	—
September 8	Barcelona	Spain	Palau Sant Jordi	Luzía	—	—
September 11	Madrid	Spain	Movistar Arena	Gale	60,661 / 60,661	$12,747,881
September 12	Madrid	Spain	Movistar Arena	Gale	60,661 / 60,661	$12,747,881
September 14	Madrid	Spain	Movistar Arena	Chiara Oliver	60,661 / 60,661	$12,747,881
September 15	Madrid	Spain	Movistar Arena	Gara Durán	60,661 / 60,661	$12,747,881
September 18	Barakaldo (Note: Labelled as Bilbao in promotional material.)	Spain	Bizkaia Arena	—N/a	—	—
September 19	Barakaldo	Spain	Bizkaia Arena	—N/a	—	—
October 16	Bogotá	Colombia	Movistar Arena	—N/a	5,791 / 6,437	$477,728
October 19	Santiago	Chile	Santander Arena	Alexia Naomi	—	—
October 21	Buenos Aires	Argentina	Movistar Arena	Olivia Wald	—	—
October 22	Buenos Aires	Argentina	Movistar Arena	Olivia Wald	—	—
October 23	Buenos Aires	Argentina	Movistar Arena	Candu Dominguez	—	—
October 28	Monterrey	Mexico	Auditorio Banamex	—N/a	—	—
October 30	Zapopan (Note: Labelled as Guadalajara in promotional material.)	Mexico	Telmex Auditorium	—N/a	—	—
October 31	Querétaro	Mexico	Auditorio Josefa Ortiz	—N/a	—	—
November 5	Mexico City	Mexico	Auditorio Nacional	—N/a	—	—
November 6	Mexico City	Mexico	Auditorio Nacional	—N/a	—	—
November 7	Mexico City	Mexico	Auditorio Nacional	—N/a	—	—
November 27	Brooklyn (Note: Labelled as New York City in promotional material.)	United States	Brooklyn Paramount	—N/a	—	—
November 29	Miami Beach (Note: Labelled as Miami in promotional material.)	United States	The Fillmore Miami Beach	—N/a	—	—

List of 2027 concerts
Date (2027)	City	Country	Venue	Attendance	Revenue
February 6	Lisbon	Portugal	Sagres Campo Pequeno	—	—
February 12	London	United Kingdom	London Palladium	—	—
February 13	London	United Kingdom	London Palladium	—	—
February 20	Paris	France	Salle Pleyel	—	—

=== Cancelled shows ===
List of cancelled shows
Date	City	Country	Venue	Reason
November 4, 2026	Puebla	Mexico	Auditorio GNP Seguros	Logistics conflicts
