= Cuarto Azul =

Cuarto azul

Studio album by Aitana
- Released: May 30, 2025
- Studios: Los Angeles; Miami (home studio recorded)
- Genres: Pop; synth-pop; electropop
- Length: 57:54
- Language: Spanish
- Label: Universal Music Spain
- Producers: Andrés Torres; Casta; DallasK; Kuinvi; Manu Lara; Mauricio Rengifo; Nico Cotton; SpreadLof
- Compiler: Aitana (herself)

Aitana chronology
Alpha (2023)	Cuarto azul (2025)

Singles from Cuarto azul
- 1. "Segundo intento" Released: January 24, 2025; 2. "Sentimiento natural" Released: March 13, 2025; 3. "6 de febrero" Released: May 6, 2025; 4. "Cuando Hables con Él" Released: May 30, 2025; 5. "Superestrella" Released: October 31, 2025; 6. "Conexión Psíquica" Released: September 14, 2026

Cuarto azul (Note: In this Spanish-language name the album title only keeps one capital letter at the beginning of the title according to Royal Spanish Academy of the Spanish Language.) (English: Blue Bedroom) is the fourth studio album by Spanish singer Aitana. It was released through Universal Music Spain on May 30, 2025. The album was produced by Nico Cotton.

Upon release, Cuarto azul debuted atop PROMUSICAE's Top 100 Álbumes chart and was certified gold after surpassing 20,000 combined units in its first week on the chart. All the songs from the album debuted on the PROMUSICAE Top 100 Canciones chart following its release. That week, both "Segundo intento" and "Sentimiento natural" re-entered the Top 50, and "6 de febrero" climbed from number 9 to 8. In Argentina, following the album’s success, "6 de febrero" also peaked at number 27 at the Argentina Hot 100.

Following Metamorfosis Season concert series in July, the album returned to peak position for a fourth week atop the Top 100 Álbumes chart and was certified platinum after surpassing 40,000 units sold in Spain.

Cuarto azul received a nomination for the Best Contemporary Pop Album and a win for Best Recording Package at the 26th Annual Latin Grammy Awards, marking Aitana's first career win at the ceremony.

== Background ==
In 2024, Aitana confirmed that her fourth studio album was in production.

In January 2025, the singer published a teaser on her social media platforms that featured a blue bedroom under the title "Nuevo año, nueva era." Which is translated to, ("New year, new era"). During that same month, Aitana started publishing encrypted messages through her official social media. On May 8, 2025, the singer announced the release date of the album.

== Recording ==
Cuarto azul is an electropop album, influenced by synth-pop, new wave, Spanish pop and power ballads. The record adopts a slow, ballad-like style, marking a departure from the singer’s previous album, Alpha. The tracks of Cuarto azul are generally slower and address more mature themes than the aforementioned previous album.

The album was recorded in Los Angeles and Miami, alongside the recording of Aitana's Netflix documentary, Metamorfosis. Cuarto Azul received production from Andrés Torres, Casta and DallasK, Kuinvi, Manu Lara, Nico Cotton, SpreadLof and Mauricio Rengifo. It also includes collaborations with Jay Wheeler, Ela Taubert, Barry B, Myke Towers, Kenia Os, Daniel Ocean and Alaska.

== Concept ==
Aitana presents her fourth album as an emotional journey that begins in darkness, shaped by resentment, frustration, anxiety, and depression, an atmosphere reflected that is reflected in the opening tracks. As the record unfolds, that darkness gradually gives way to light. This shift takes form with the arrival of the interlude and a voice note to her friends, which serve as a turning point in the album's narrative.

For the artist, blue represents a safe space, as her childhood bedroom was entirely painted in Klein Blue. During the creative process, she went through a particularly difficult personal period, and Cuarto azul became a way to reconnect with herself by symbolically returning to the place where she grew up and felt most like herself. That connection to her past allowed her to confront feelings of being lost from a space of familiarity and comfort.

The album is divided into two parts. The first half is marked by an emotionally dark tone. In contrast, the second half conveys a sense of healing and the recovery of emotions that had begun to fade. This emotional transition is marked by the interlude "Luz de la mañana (interlude)", which acts as a bridge between the two sides of the project.

== Release and promotion ==
Universal Music released the album on May 30, 2025. It became available on streaming platforms, digital download, CD, LP, cassette, and as part of a special box set. The box set included a figurine of Aitana listening to music in her blue room, a CD, and a signed card from the singer. Pre-orders, which were exclusive to fans, began on Friday, May 9, just one day after the album’s release was officially announced.

=== Singles ===
"Segundo Intento" (Spanish for "Second try") was the first song released from the album. It serves as the lead single. It was released on January 23, 2025. The song follows the electropop sound from Aitana's previous work Alpha, drawing comparison to "Enola Gay" by Orchestral Manoeuvres in the Dark and "Blinding Lights" by The Weeknd. Following its release, the song entered and peaked at number eighteen on PROMUSICAE's Top 100 Canciones.

"Sentimiento natural" (Spanish for "Natural feeling") was released on March 13, 2025 as the second single from Cuarto Azul. Featuring Puerto Rican rapper and singer Myke Towers, the song marked a departure from the previous single by incorporating more tropical sounds. In its first week, the song debuted at number seven on the Top 100 Canciones chart, becoming the first top 10 hit from Cuarto Azul.

"6 de febrero" (Spanish for "February 6") was released on May 5, 2025, as the third single from Cuarto Azul. A Spanish New wave pop ballad, the song became a commercial success in Spain. It entered the Spanish weekly Spotify streaming chart at number eleven with 1,616,894 on-demand streams, despite having only three days of availability. In its first full tracking week "6 de febrero" jumped to number two, accumulating 2,879,617 new streams, and became the second top 10 streaming hit from Cuarto Azul, following "Sentimiento natural". On PROMUSICAE's Top 100 Canciones chart, it debuted at number eight, becoming the album's second top 10 and second-highest debut, also based on only three days of tracking. The following week, it rose to number two, marking Aitana's first top three single from the album and third top 10 overall. It also became her highest-charting single since the Quevedo collaboration, "Gran Vía", which spent three weeks at number one. Following the release of Cuarto Azul, the song saw a resurgence in chart points and climbed from number nine to number eight.

=== Marketing ===
The full track list of the album was not revealed immediately. Instead, in the video Aitana shared to announce the project, it was shown that the album would feature 19 songs, including the singles "Segundo Intento", "Sentimiento Natural", and "6 de febrero". On May 14, Aitana officially revealed the song titles. That same day, she also launched a daily countdown series in collaboration with Spotify, releasing one short clip per day leading up to the album’s release on May 30. On May 22, she shared a preview on Instagram featuring snippets of four tracks: "Desde que ya no hablamos", "En el centro de la cama", "Superestrella", and "Ex ex ex".

A few days later, on May 27, Aitana held a listening party at the Movistar Arena in Madrid, where all 19 tracks of the album were presented exclusively for the first time. During that same week, she promoted Cuarto Azul across various music media outlets and appeared on the Spanish TV show El Hormiguero. On June 6, an "immersive listening experience" of the album took place at Casa Seat in Barcelona.

=== Tour ===
On July 31, Aitana announced 24 cities across Europe, the United States, and Latin America where she will perform in 2026 as part of the Cuarto Azul World Tour.

== Critical reception ==
Professional ratings
Review scores
Source	Rating
Jenesaispop	6.8/10

Julieta Chávez of Rolling Stone referred to the album as Aitana's most personal project, noting its intimate and direct lyrical style."

Jessica Roiz, writing for Billboard, commented on the album's lyrical approach and discussed its themes of personal reflection.

In a review for Jenesaispop, Sebas E. Alonso identified synth-pop as a prominent feature and highlighted the 1980s influence on several tracks. Alonso commented that, the album's ballads lacked originality and also questioned the decision to include 19 tracks. He noted the album's focus on personal experiences.

== Accolades ==
Cuarto azul received a nomination for the Best Contemporary Pop Album and a win for Best Recording Package at the 26th Annual Latin Grammy Awards, marking Aitana's first career win at the ceremony.

Awards and nominations for Cuarto azul
Year	Organization	Award	Result	Ref.
2025	Los 40 Music Awards	Best Spanish Album	Nominated	
2025	Latin Grammy Awards	Best Contemporary Pop Album	Nominated	
2025	Latin Grammy Awards	Best Recording Package	Won	
2026	Lo Nuestro Awards	Pop - Album of The Year	Nominated	
2026	Premios de la Academia de Música	Best Pop Album	Nominated	
2026	Premios Odeón	Best Pop Album	Won	
2026	Premios Juventud	Best Pop Album	Won	

== Commercial performance ==
In the week of its release, Cuarto azul accumulated 7.49 million on-demand streams on Spotify. Of those, 4.5 million came from Aitana’s home country, Spain, marking the singer’s best streaming debut to date.

== Track listing ==
Credits adapted from Tidal.

Cuarto Azul track listing
No.	Title	Writer(s)	Producer(s)	Length
1.	"6 de Febrero"	Aitana Ocaña; Andrés Torres; Mauricio Rengifo	Andrés Torres; Mauricio Rengifo	2:55
2.	"Duele un Montón Despedirme de Ti" (with Jay Wheeler)	Ocaña; José Ángel López Martínez; Nicolás Cotton; Carolina Isabel Colón Juarbe; Andy Clay; Kevin Omar Ortiz Bones; Damián Ortega Bonilla	Nico Cotton	3:00
3.	"Segundo Intento"	Ocaña; Cotton; Colón Juarbe	Cotton	3:11
4.	"¿Para Qué Volver?" (with Ela Taubert)	Ocaña; Manuela Pardo Taubert; Cotton; Colón Juarbe; Kevin Aguirre	Cotton	2:21
5.	"Cuarto Azul"	Ocaña; Cotton; Colón Juarbe	Cotton	3:20
6.	"Desde Que Ya No Hablamos"	Ocaña; Cotton; Valentina López; Colón Juarbe; Manuel Lorente Freire	Cotton; Kuinvi	2:53
7.	"De 1 Beso a 2 Besos"	Ocaña; Luis Miguel Gómez Castaño; Lorente Freire; Vicente Jiménez Gómez del Barco	Casta; SpreadLof	3:17
8.	"Trankis" (with Barry B)	Ocaña; Gabriel Barriuso; Cotton	Cotton	3:18
9.	"Música en el Cielo"	Ocaña; Manuel Lara; Lorente Freire; Pablo César Rodríguez; Andry José Leal Matheus	Manu Lara	3:50
10.	"Cuando Hables con Él"	Ocaña; Torres; Rengifo	Torres; Rengifo	3:05
11.	"Luz de la Mañana" (Interlude)	Ocaña; Lara	Lara	0:42
12.	"En el Centro de la Cama"	Ocaña; Lara; López; Lorente Freire; César Rodríguez; Jiménez Gómez del Barco	Lara; Kuinvi	3:44
13.	"Sentimiento Natural" (with Myke Towers)	Ocaña; Michael A. Torres Monge; Torres; Rengifo; Orlando J. Cepeda Matos; Julio Emmanuel Batista Santos	Torres; Rengifo	3:13
14.	"Conexión Psíquica"	Ocaña; Dallas Koehlke; Colón Juarbe	DallasK	3:40
15.	"Superestrella"	Ocaña; Cotton; Colón Juarbe	Cotton	3:03
16.	"Ex Ex Ex" (with Kenia Os)	Ocaña; Kenia Guadalupe Flores Osuna; Cotton; Colón Juarbe; Mechi Pieretti	Cotton	3:01
17.	"Hoy Es Tu Cumpleaños" (with Danny Ocean)	Ocaña; Daniel Alejandro Morales Reyes; Lara; Lorente Freire; César Rodríguez	Lara	3:22
18.	"Lía"	Ocaña; Torres; Rengifo; Sebastián Obando Giraldo	Torres; Rengifo	2:48
19.	"La Chica Perfecta" (with Alaska)	Ocaña; Cotton; Colón Juarbe	Cotton	3:11
Total length:				57:54

=== Notes ===
- All track titles are stylized in all caps.
- Alaska is credited as Fangoria in the last track on digital platforms.

== Charts ==
Weekly chart performance for Cuarto azul
Chart (2025–2026)	Peak position
Spanish Albums (Promusicae)	1
Portuguese Albums (AFP)	150
US Latin Pop Albums (Billboard)	12

== Certifications and sales ==
Certifications for Cuarto azul
Region	Certification	Certified units/sales
Spain (Promusicae)	4× Platinum	160,000^{‡}
^{‡} Sales+streaming figures based on certification alone.
