= Metamorfosis Season =

2025 concert tour by Aitana

- Tour by Aitana
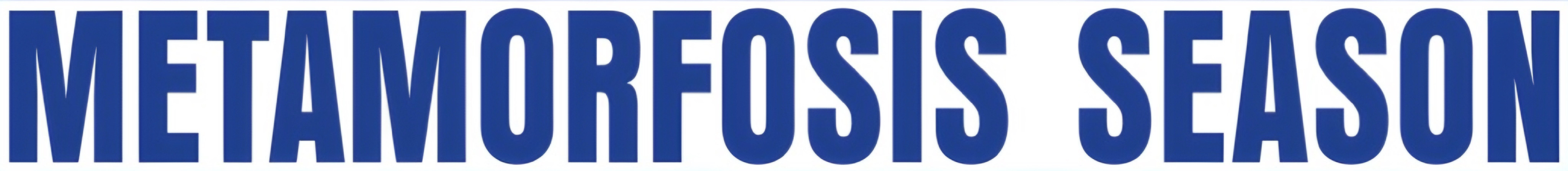
- Location: Europe
- Associated album: Various
- Start date: 19 July 2025
- End date: 31 July 2025
- No. of shows: 3
- Producer: Global Talent Services
- Attendance: 160,000 (3 shows)

Aitana concert chronology
- Alpha Tour (2023–2024); Metamorfosis Season (2025); Cuarto Azul World Tour (2026-2027)

Metamorfosis Season is a concert series by Spanish singer, songwriter, and actress Aitana, supporting her discography. It drew a total audience of 160,000 people, with all three shows selling out.

== Announcements ==
On 5 December 2023, Aitana announced that she would be performing a "special concert" at the Santiago Bernabéu Stadium in Madrid as a closure of her Alpha Tour in December 2024. A second show was added on 14 May 2024 due to "phenomenal demand". After concerts by Taylor Swift, Luis Miguel, Duki and Karol G manifested discomfort from local residents due to the stadium's soundproof after renovations, doubts around the question of performing concerts at Santiago Bernabéu arose. In September 2024, Real Madrid announced that all concerts scheduled to happen at the stadium would be put on hold until, at least, March 2025. Aitana's concerts were moved to 27 and 28 June 2025, coinciding with the singer's 26th birthday. Later, in an interview with Los40, Aitana described the concerts as "a compilation of everything we’ve lived through", moving away from the idea of holding these performances as encores for the Alpha Tour.

On 19 February 2025, during an appearance on La Revuelta, Aitana announced that after her Madrid concerts, she would perform at the Estadi Olímpic Lluís Companys in Barcelona. On 16 March, Aitana confirmed that the Bernabéu concerts were still scheduled. The following day, she revealed the name of the tour and the Barcelona concert date.

On April 7, Aitana announced that the concerts at Santiago Bernabéu would be moved to the Riyadh Air Metropolitano Stadium, and rescheduled to 30 and 31 July. On July 3, 2025, Julieta was announced as the opening act for the Barcelona concert on July 19. Then, on July 22, 2025, it was confirmed that Gale would open the first Madrid concert, scheduled for July 30. The following day, Ela Taubert was announced as the opening act for the second night in Madrid.

== Setlist ==
This setlist includes all the songs performed, except for musical surprises and variations specific to each city.

1. "6 de febrero"
2. "Superestrella"
3. "Teléfono"
4. "Popcorn"
5. "Lo malo" (includes elements of Usher's "Yeah!")
6. "Presiento" / "Más de lo que aposté"
7. "Con la miel en los labios"
8. "Vas a quedarte"
9. "Sentimiento natural"
10. "11 razones"
11. "Si no vas a volver" / "= (Igual)" / "No te has ido y ya te extraño"
12. "Tu foto del DNI" (includes elements of Avril Lavigne's "Girlfriend")
13. "Cuando te fuiste"
14. "+ (Más)"
15. "Mon Amour"
16. "Duele un montón despedirme de ti"
17. "Música en el cielo"
18. "Los Ángeles" (includes elements of "Dararí" and ABBA's "Gimme! Gimme! Gimme! (A Man After Midnight)", "Voulez-Vous" and "Dancing Queen")
19. "Miamor"
20. "2 Extraños" (includes elements of Madonna's "Vogue")
21. "En el coche" (includes elements of Haddaway's "What Is Love" and Crystal Waters' "Gypsy Woman (She's Homeless)")
22. "AQYNE"
23. "Gran Vía"
24. "24 rosas"
25. "Cuando hables con él"
26. "Pensando en ti" (includes elements of Eurythmics' "Sweet Dreams (Are Made of This)" and Pont Aeri's "Flying Free")
27. "Mariposas"
28. "Formentera"
29. "Las babys"
30. "Segundo intento"
31. "La chica perfecta"
32. "Conexión psíquica"

=== Notes ===
- At the July 19 show in Barcelona, Aitana performed "Lo malo" with Ana Guerra. She also sang "La gent que estimo" with Josep Montero after "Con la miel en los labios", and performed "Boig per tu" with Pep Sala after "Cuando hables con él".
- At the July 30 show in Madrid, Aitana performed "Si tú la quieres" and "Mi princesa" with David Bisbal after "Lo malo", "Devuélveme a mi chica" with Hombres G after "+ (Más)" and "La canción que no quiero cantarte" with Amaia after "Pensando en ti". Starting with this show, "Presiento" and "Más de lo que aposté" were removed from the repertoire.
- At the July 31 show in Madrid, Aitana performed "¿Para qué volver?" with Ela Taubert after "Vas a quedarte" and "Marta, Sebas, Guille y los demás" with Amaral after "Pensando en ti".

== Dates ==
List of 2025 concerts
Date	City	Country	Venue	Opening acts	Attendance	Revenue
July 19	Barcelona	Spain	Estadi Olímpic Lluís Companys	Julieta	50,493 / 50,493	$3,438,263
July 30 (Note: The concert on 30 July 2025 was previously scheduled for 28 December 2024, and 27 June 2025 at Santiago Bernabéu Stadium, being rescheduled due to concerns about the stadium's soundproof.)	Madrid	Spain	Riyadh Air Metropolitano Stadium	Gale	51,299 / 51,299	$3,313,009
July 31 (Note: The concert on 31 July 2025 was previously scheduled for 29 December 2024, and 28 June 2025 at Santiago Bernabéu Stadium, being rescheduled due to concerns about the stadium's soundproof.)	Madrid	Spain	Riyadh Air Metropolitano Stadium	Ela Taubert	51,401 / 51,401	$3,371,447
