= Lucas Johnson (artist) =

American artist (1940 – 2002)

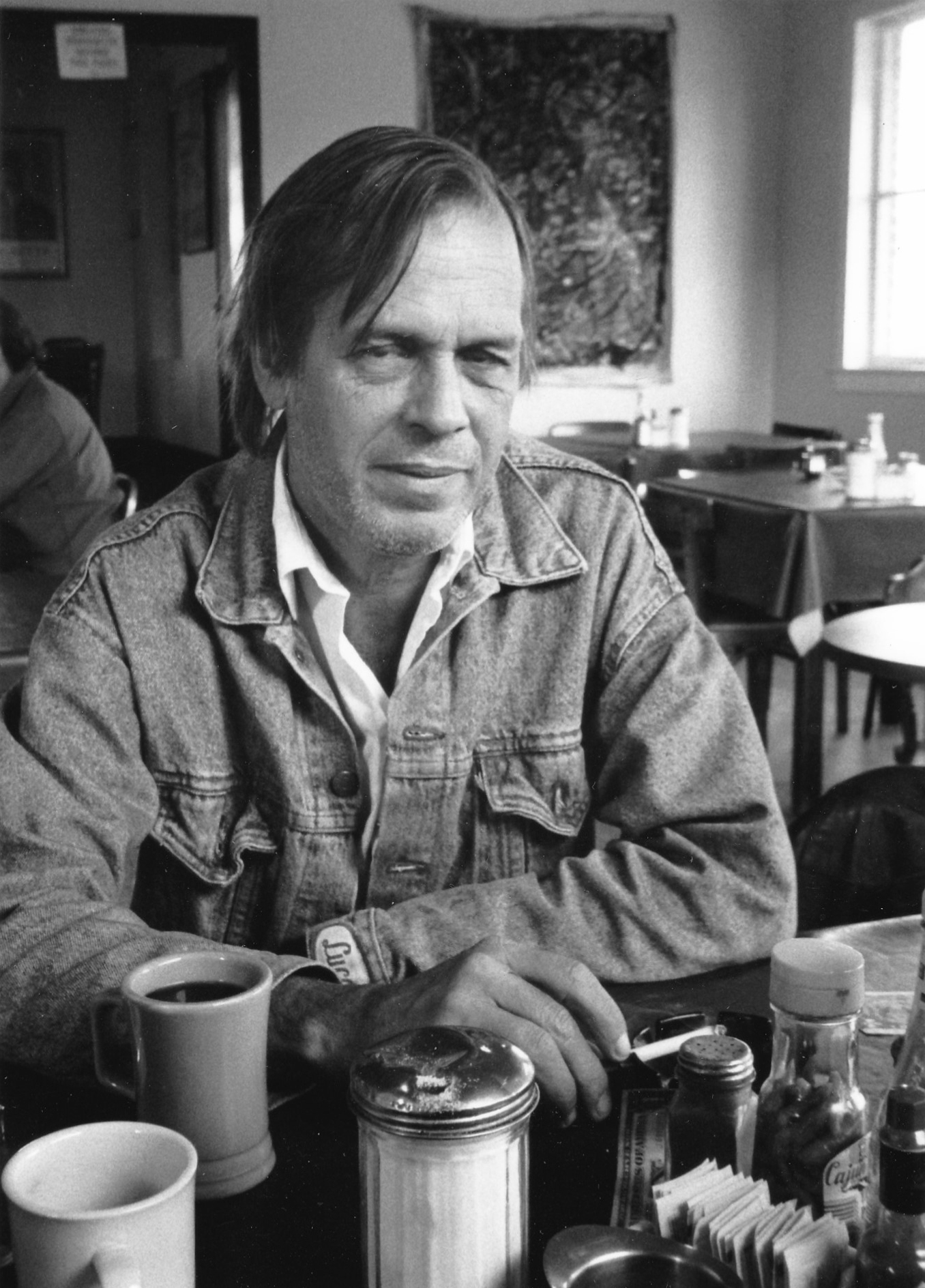
- Lucas Johnson, Houston, Texas, 1990s
- Born: Leonard Lucas Johnson Jr. October 24, 1940; Hartford, Connecticut
- Died: August 31, 2002 (aged 61); Aransas Pass, Texas
- Known for: Painting, drawing, printmaking
- Movement: Social realism, Surrealism
- Spouses: Sharon Johnston; Helen Bickham (m. 1964–1971) Patricia Covo (m. 1971–2002)

Lucas Johnson (October 24, 1940 – August 31, 2002) was an American artist and major force in the Texas art scene from the late 1960s to the early 2000s. Largely self-taught, he mastered numerous techniques, including egg tempera, pen and ink drawing, silverpoint, oil and acrylic painting, and the printmaking disciplines of aquatint, etching, lithography, serigraphy, drypoint and mezzotint. He was inspired by politics, music, fishing and the culture of Mexico, where he lived for a decade. His unique vision found expression in a wide range of subjects, from haunting, shamanic beings and quirky aquatic life to enigmatic, volcanic landscapes and still lifes of the orchid species he collected and cultivated.

== Early life ==
Johnson was born in Hartford, Connecticut on October 24, 1940. At the age of seven, his family relocated to San Gabriel, California. At some point in elementary school, the youngster visited the Huntington Library on a class field trip. This first encounter with serious art, specifically Thomas Gainsborough's The Blue Boy, would shape Johnson's life.

After graduating high school, Johnson enrolled at the University of California-Los Angeles to pursue a degree in marine biology. But, realizing his true calling as that of an artist, he dropped out before his junior year. Johnson traveled widely as a young man, working his way across the country with a series of odd jobs. He taught skiing, herded cattle and harvested wheat, before landing in New Orleans in 1960. By studying books, he taught himself basic art techniques, and then honed his craft making paintings for tourists in Jackson Square. During his stay in New Orleans, Johnson befriended figurative artist George Tooker, who encouraged the young painter to try his hand at egg tempera, Tooker's medium of choice.

Johnson left New Orleans for New York, where he met a group of writers that included poet and editor Daniel Halpern, and the poet Joel Cohen. In 1962, at Cohen's invitation, Johnson accompanied the writer to Mexico City. When Cohen returned to the U.S., Johnson cashed in his return ticket and stayed in Mexico. He would live there for the next ten years.

== Career ==
In Mexico, Johnson immersed himself in the country's humanist and socio-political art traditions, eventually becoming a first-rate artist. His circle of friends included Mexican and expatriate writers, artists, musicians and actors, including poet Margaret Randall, composer Conlon Nancarrow, Surrealist painter Leonora Carrington, Sculptor Naomi Siegmann, and humanist draftsman José Luis Cuevas. At the time, Mexico City's avant garde art community was rebelling against its predecessors, the "Big Three" of the mural movement, Diego Rivera, José Clemente Orozco and David Alfaro Siqueiros. Painters of the new generation were looking to widen their horizons by embracing European and American artistic influences. Within a year of his arrival, Johnson was exhibiting in galleries and other venues alongside leading Mexican artists.

Among the sites showcasing his work were the Galeria Sagitario, a co-op, of sorts, and the Galeria de Arte Misrachi, a venue specializing in Mexican "Old Masters." Initially, Johnson exhibited only drawings, which were lauded as the product of a consummate draftsman. He would start showing his paintings in 1967. They were received with similar enthusiasm.

In the mid-1960s, Johnson made the acquaintance of Dorman and Diane David, a Houston-based brother and sister who owned a rare bookstore and art gallery. Dorman frequently visited Mexico in search of historical documents and Texana. From 1964 until it closed in 1972, David Gallery regularly featured Johnson's paintings and drawings in solo shows.

In 1972, Johnson and his third wife Patricia Covo, a native Mexican of European heritage, returned to the U.S., first to New Mexico and then to Houston, Texas. In Houston's vibrant art scene of the era, Johnson's reputation grew and he rapidly developed a following. Covo Johnson founded a gallery, Covo de Iongh, in 1975. She represented her husband's work, and that of Mexican artists, until the gallery ceased operations in 1978. Johnson signed on with Moody Gallery in 1975. He exhibited there until his death; the gallery still handles his work.

== Work ==
Johnson's oeuvre has been characterized as "imagist", a term that usually refers to a short-lived, early-20th century poetic style. Related to Surrealism, Imagism was advanced by T.S. Eliot, Ezra Pound and H.D. (Hilda Doolittle), among others. Similar to Surrealism, Imagist art, whether written or visual, employs recognizable figures, locations and objects, but juxtaposes them in fantastic or unreal ways, as metaphors.

Mysterious figures, landscapes, as well as aquatic and plant life were all source material and subject matter for Johnson's work. He would focus on one subject for a time, and then move on to the next. Strange characters engaged in ritual or ceremony populated the early paintings. Fantastic marine life, real and imagined, inspired him in the mid-1980s, when he created the Gulf Coast Estuary series. Volcanoes, which he thought of as self-portraits, also surfaced in the pieces of the 1980s. Ten years later, he produced a series of dark symbolic dreamscapes known as Drawings from the Underworld. His final body of work stemmed from a lifelong interest in plant forms, orchids, in particular.

While the meticulous and frequently delicate drawings are rendered in black and gray tones, Johnson's paintings burst with vivid colors: reds, oranges, blues and greens.

== Personal life ==
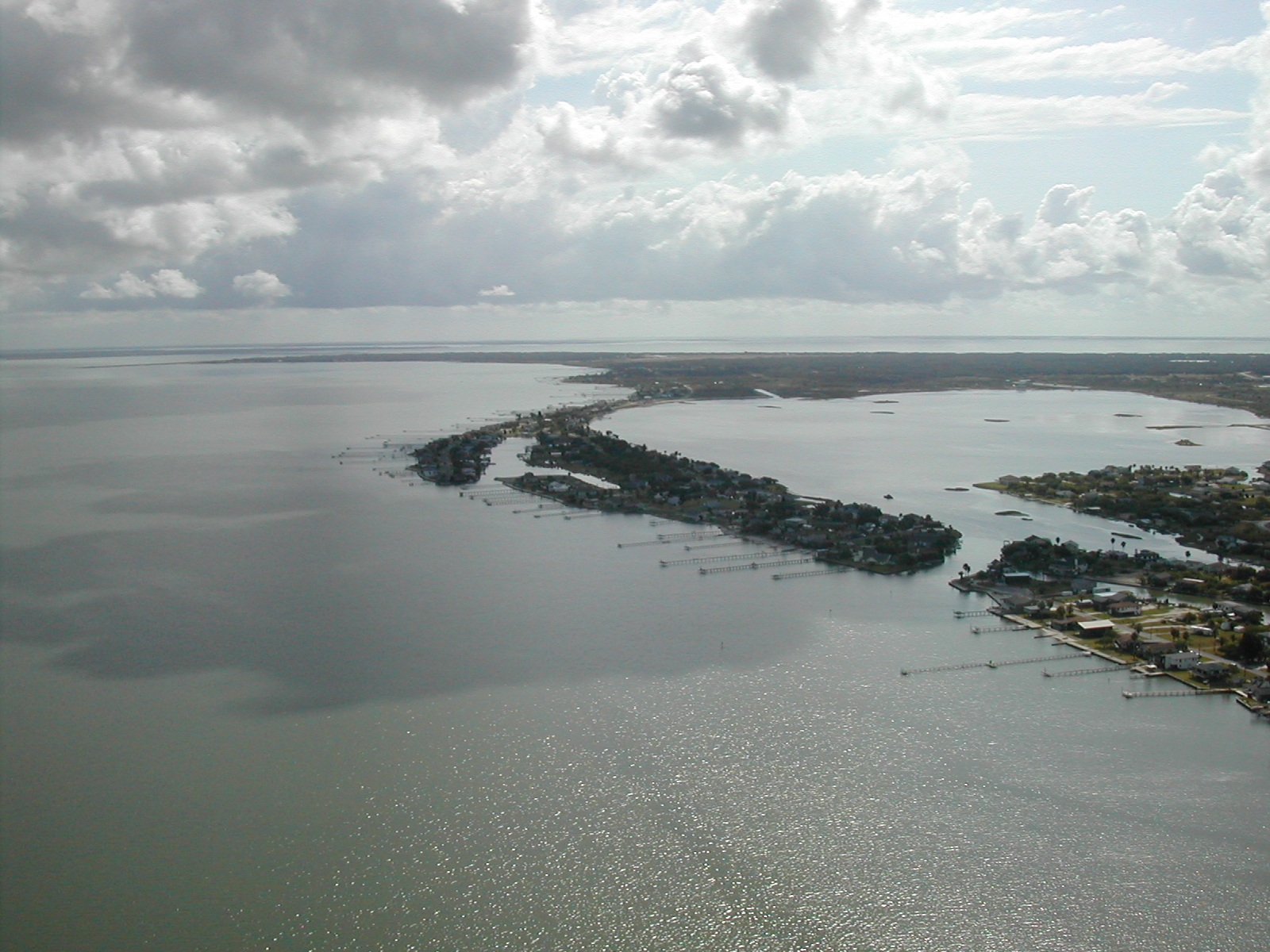
Copano Bay, Aransas County, Texas

Johnson married three times. The marriage to first wife, Sharon Johnston, his high school sweetheart, lasted for less than a year and ended before his cross-country trek. His second wife, artist Helen Bickham, was teaching English at Mexico City's Instituto Politécnico Nacional when she and Johnson met. They married in 1964 and divorced in 1971. He met his third wife, former gallerist and Houston Chronicle art critic, Patricia Covo, while she was managing the Galeria de Arte Misrachi in Mexico City. They wed in November 1971. At the time of his death, they had been married nearly 31 years.

Johnson maintained studios in Houston's Montrose neighborhood and then on Columbia Street in Houston Heights. In 1997, the Johnsons bought commercial property in Rockport, Texas, where Lucas intended to build a new primary studio.

He died unexpectedly of heart failure at the age of 61 while fishing with Art Guy Jack Massing at Aransas Pass.

Johnson's ashes were scattered on Copano Bay. A plaque dedicated to his memory is installed on the observation deck at Aransas National Wildlife Refuge. It reads, "Lucas Johnson, October 24, 1940-August 31, 2002. Artist, angler, birder, and friend."

== Achievements and legacy ==
=== Collections ===
Johnson's work is in the permanent collections of many museums, including:

- Art Museum of Southeast Texas, Beaumont, Texas
- Houston Airport System, Houston, Texas
- Museum of Fine Arts, Houston, Houston, Texas
- Menil Collection, Houston, Texas
- San Antonio Museum of Art, San Antonio, Texas
- Art Museum of South Texas, Corpus Christi, Texas
- Jose Luis Cuevas Museum of Drawings, Mexico City, Mexico
- Museum of Modern Art, Tel Aviv, Israel
- Toledo Museum, Oaxaca, Mexico
- National Museum, Warsaw, Poland
- Brooklyn Museum, Brooklyn, New York
- Los Angeles County Museum of Art, Los Angeles, California
- San Francisco Museum of Modern Art, San Francisco, California
- Delgado Museum of Art, New Orleans, Louisiana
- Greenville County Museum of Art, Greenville, South Carolina
- Massachusetts Institute of Technology, Cambridge, Massachusetts
- Smithsonian Institution, American Graphics Collection, Washington, D.C.
- United States Embassy Permanent Collection, Mexico, D.F.
- Brooklyn Library, Brooklyn, New York
- Blanton Museum of Art, University of Texas, Austin, Texas
- University of Houston Print Collection, Houston, Texas
- Museo de Arte de Ponce, Ponce, Puerto Rico
- Mexican Museum, San Francisco, California
- Santa Cruz Museum of Art and History, Santa Cruz, California
- Amarillo Art Center, Amarillo, Texas
- Instituto Mexicano-Norteamericano, Mexico, D.F.
- University of Southern Illinois, Carbondale, Illinois
- Wichita Falls Museum, Wichita Falls, Texas
- Museum of Fine Arts at the Museum of New Mexico, Santa Fe, New Mexico
- Museo Jose Luis Cuevas, Mexico City, Mexico
- Memphis Brooks Museum of Art, Memphis, Tennessee
- Fibracel de Mexico, Mexico, D.F.
- Malone and Hyde, Memphis, Tennessee
- General Motors Foundation Permanent Traveling Collection
- Bank of the Southwest, Houston, Texas
- Wilson Industries, Houston, Texas
- Andrews and Kurth, Houston, Texas

=== Solo exhibitions ===
Johnson's solo exhibitions include the following.

2019 -	"Selected Paintings & Drawings", Moody Gallery, Houston, Texas
2016 -	Shenzhen Fine Art Institute, Shenzhen, China
2015 -	“Drawings 1987-1997”, Moody Gallery, Houston, Texas
2012 -	“Original Prints”, Moody Gallery, Houston, Texas
2009 -	“Drawings, 1971-1990”, Moody Gallery, Houston, Texas
2005 -	“Lucas Johnson”, Station Museum, Houston, Texas
2004 -	“In Memoriam: Lucas Johnson”, Rockport Center for the Arts, Rockport, Texas
2003 -	“A Selection of Paintings & Works on Paper”, Moody Gallery, Houston, Texas
2002 -	“Prints and Drawings 1966-2001”, Red Bud Gallery, Houston, Texas
2001 -	“The Orchid Paintings and Other Still Lifes”, Museum of East Texas, Lufkin, Texas
1999 -	“Laelias, Schomburgkias and Other Still Lifes”, Moody Gallery, Houston, Texas
1998 -	Fenderesky Gallery, Belfast, Northern Ireland
1996 -	“Lucas Johnson: A Survey”, University of Texas at San Antonio, San Antonio, Texas
1996 -	“Texas Artist of the Year”, Art League of Houston, Houston, Texas
1996 -	“Drawings from the Underworld”, Art Museum of South Texas, Corpus Christi, Texas
1996 -	Mulcahy Modern Gallery, Dallas, Texas
1995 -	Moody Gallery, Houston, Texas
1994 -	Moody Gallery, Houston, Texas
1994 -	“Drawings from the Underworld”, Contemporary Arts Museum, Houston, Texas
1994 -	“Drawings from the Underworld”, Galveston Arts Center, Galveston, Texas
1993 -	“Recent Etchings”, Moody Gallery, Houston, Texas
1993 -	“Recent Paintings and Works on Paper”, Houston Festival, Compass Bank, Houston, Texas
1991 -	"Recent Paintings", Moody Gallery, Houston, Texas
1990 -	"Drawings", Museo Ex -Convento del Carmen, Guadalajara, Mexico
1988 -	"Recent Drawings", Moody Gallery, Houston, Texas
1987 -	"Drawings from the Estuary Series", Serpentine Gallery, London, UK
1985 -	"Paintings and Drawings", Moody Gallery, Houston, Texas
1982 -	"Recent Paintings and Monotypes", Moody Gallery, Houston, Texas
1981 -	"Recent Paintings", Union Planters Bank Art Gallery, Memphis, Tennessee
1980 -	"Recent Paintings and Drawings", Moody Gallery, Houston, Texas
1979 -	"Iconos de Oaxaca", Moody Gallery, Houston, Texas
1979 -	Galleria Avril, Mexico, D.F.
1978 -	Covo de Iongh, Houston, Texas
1977 -	Moody Gallery, Houston, Texas
1976 -	"Drawings", University of Houston- Clear Lake, Clear Lake, Texas
1976 -	"The Louisiana Paintings", Moody Gallery, Houston, Texas
1976 -	College of the Mainland, Texas City, Texas
1974 -	Galeria de Arte Misrachi, Mexico, D.F
1972 -	Galeria de Arte Misrachi, Mexico, D.F
1971 -	David Gallery, Houston, Texas
1971 -	Gotham Gallery, New York, New York
1970 -	David Gallery, Houston, Texas
1970 -	Galeria de Arte Misrachi, Mexico, D.F
1969 -	David Gallery, Houston, Texas
1968 -	David Gallery, Houston, Texas
1967 -	Galeria Edan, Acapulco, Mexico
1967 -	Galeria Sagitario, Mexico, D.F
1967 -	Instituto Mexicano-Norteamericano, Mexico, D.F
1967 -	David Gallery, Houston, Texas
1967 -	William Sawyer Gallery, San Francisco, California
1966 -	Instituto Mexicano-Norteamericano, Mexico, D.F.
1966 -	David Gallery, Houston, Texas
1965 -	Galeria Chapultepec, Mexico, D.F.
1965 -	Instituto de Cultura Hispanica, Mexico, D.F.
1964 -	Drawings, Woodstock, New York
1964 -	Instituto Mexicano-Norteamericano, Monterrey, Mexico
1964 -	Instituto Mexicano-Norteamericano, San Luis Potosí, Mexico

=== Selected group exhibitions ===
Notable group exhibitions that featured Johnson's work include:

2007 -	“Amistad”, National Museum, Lima, Peru and Museum of Modern Art, Trujillo, Peru
2006 -	“Houston Contemporary Art”, Shanghai Art Museum, Shanghai, China
2004 -	“Perspectives @ 25: A Quarter Century of New Art in Houston”, Contemporary Arts Museum, Houston, Texas
2002 -	“Houston Works”, ARTCO Gallery, Leipzig, Germany
1999 -	“Three From Texas, USA”, Gallery of Art Shange, Chengdu, China
1996 -	“Manif II”, Unna Gallery, Seoul, Korea
1996 -	“Rediscovering the Landscape of the Americas”, Gerald Peters Gallery, Santa Fe, NM
1992 -	“New Texas Art”, Cheney Cowles Museum, Spokane, Washington and Boise Art Museum, Boise, Idaho
1986 -	"Cinq x Cinq Houston, Texas", Galerie Dario Boccara, Paris, France
1985 -	Fresh Paint: The Houston School", Museum of Fine Arts, Houston, Texas
1982 -	"Art from Houston in Norway", Stavanger Museum, Stavanger, Norway
1979 -	"Fire", Contemporary Arts Museum, Houston, Texas
1968 -	"Olympic Collective", Collection of the Mexican-American Institute, Mexico, D.F.

=== Awards ===
In 1996, The Art League of Houston named Johnson Artist of the Year. Concurrent with this celebration were three solo exhibitions of his work:

- "Texas Artist of the Year", Art League of Houston, Houston, Texas
- "Lucas Johnson: A Survey", University of Texas at San Antonio, Division of Art & Architecture Art-Gallery, San Antonio, Texas
- "Drawings from the Underworld", Art Museum of South Texas, Corpus Christi, Texas

=== Publications ===
Lucas Johnson has been the subject of numerous newspaper and magazine articles, including a rave posthumous review in the international arts monthly Artforum. In 2006, Houston Artists Fund published a 183-page hardbound book, The Art and Life of Lucas Johnson, with a preface by acclaimed museum director Walter Hopps and an illustrated chronology by Patricia Covo Johnson.

In the book's opening essay, former Kimbell Museum director Edmund P. Pillsbury sums up the artist's life, "Johnson became a painter to express himself first and foremost as a human being. At its core, his work is a metaphor for the social condition - an expression of an abiding preoccupation with what is human or, conversely, with what reveals a lack of humanity."
