= Superestrella =

2025 song by Aitana

Single by Aitana

from the album Cuarto azul
- Language: Spanish
- English title: "Superstar"
- Released: 31 October 2025
- Recorded: December 2024
- Genre: Electropop, dance pop
- Length: 3:03
- Label: Universal Music
- Songwriters: Aitana Ocaña; Nicolás Cotton; Carolina Isabel Colón
- Producer: Nicolás Cotton

Aitana singles chronology
"6 de febrero" (2025)	"Superestrella" (2025)

Music video
- "Superestrella" on YouTube

"Superestrella" (transl. "Superstar") is a song recorded by Spanish singer Aitana. Produced by Nicolás Cotton, the track was released as a single on 31 October 2025 through Universal Music as the fourth and final single from her fourth studio album Cuarto Azul, released earlier in May. The song was written by Aitana, Carolina Isabel Colón, and Nicolás Cotton. It reached number one in Ecuador, Paraguay and Uruguay. It also reached number one on the airplay charts in Colombia, Costa Rica, El Salvador and Spain.

The song debuted at number 22 on Promusicae's Top 100 Canciones chart. Months later, it reached a new peak position, at number 2 on the Spanish charts.

The song went viral again after being associated with the Spain national football team during their victorious campaign at the 2026 FIFA World Cup.

== Background and composition ==
Aitana confirmed in 2024 that she was working on her next project. In January 2025, she released the first single, "Segundo intento" (Second Attempt). It wasn't until 9 May 2025, that she announced her fourth studio album, entitled Cuarto azul, would be released on 30 May. On 14 May, she released the tracklist of the 19 songs that make up the project, including "Superestrella" (Superstar).

On 27 May 2025, Aitana held a listening party at the Movistar Arena in Madrid, where she played all the songs from the album for the first time. On 30 May, to mark the album's release, she published a visualizer for the song on YouTube.

"Superestrella" has a duration of three minutes and three seconds. Los 40 describes the song as an explosion of confidence, a moment in which the artist leaves guilt behind and reaffirms herself as someone who deserves love. Sebas Alonso, writing for Jenesaispop, criticizes the song as "less fun than it pretends to be" and describes its theme as "about fame." Aitana wrote the lyrics for the song along with Carolina Isabel Colón and Nicolás Cotton, and Cotton contributed to its composition and production. Cotton also worked on various songs on the album, including "Segundo intento," the album's lead single.

== Charts ==
=== Weekly charts ===
Weekly chart performance
Chart (2025–2026)	Peak position
Argentina (CAPIF)	9
Argentina Hot 100 (Billboard)	2
Bolivia (Billboard)	3
Central America Airplay (Monitor Latino)	4
Central America + Caribbean Airplay (BMAT)	6
Chile (Billboard)	5
Chile Airplay (Monitor Latino)	2
Colombia Hot 100 (Billboard)	8
Colombia Airplay (National-Report)	1
Costa Rica Airplay (FONOTICA)	1
Costa Rica Streaming (FONOTICA)	7
Ecuador Airplay (Monitor Latino)	1
Ecuador Streaming (Promúsica)	1
El Salvador Airplay (ASAP EGC)	1
Global 200 (Billboard)	53
Guatemala Airplay (Monitor Latino)	2
Honduras Pop Airplay (Monitor Latino)	3
Latin America Latino Airplay (Monitor Latino)	18
Mexico (Billboard)	2
Mexico Streaming (AMPROFON)	4
Panama International (PRODUCE)	9
Panama Airplay (Monitor Latino)	7
Panama Streaming (PRODUCE)	5
Paraguay (IFPI Latin America)	1
Peru Airplay (Monitor Latino)	3
Peru Streaming (Promúsica)	2
Spain (Promusicae)	2
Spain Airplay (Promusicae)	1
Uruguay (IFPI Latin America)	1
US Hot Latin Songs (Billboard)	18
US Hot Latin Pop Songs (Billboard)	1
Venezuela Airplay (Record Report)	12

=== Monthly charts ===
Monthly chart performance
Chart (2026)	Peak position
Panama Streaming (PRODUCE)	15
Paraguay Airplay (SGP)	5
Uruguay Streaming (CUD)	6

=== Year-end charts ===
Year-end chart performance
Chart (2025)	Position
Spain (Promusicae)	26

== Certifications ==
Region	Certification	Certified units/sales
Mexico (AMPROFON)	Platinum	140,000^{‡}
Spain (Promusicae)	6× Platinum	600,000^{‡}
United States (RIAA)	2× Platinum (Latin)	120,000^{‡}
^{‡} Sales+streaming figures based on certification alone.
