= 6 de febrero =

2025 song by Aitana

Single by Aitana

from the album Cuarto azul
- Language: Spanish
- English title: "6 February"
- Released: 6 May 2025
- Genre: Latin pop; synth-pop
- Length: 2:56
- Label: Universal Music
- Songwriters: Aitana Ocaña; Andrés Torres; Mauricio Rengifo
- Producers: Andrés Torres; Mauricio Rengifo; Nicolás Cotton

Aitana singles chronology
"Sentimiento natural" (2025)	"6 de febrero" (2025)	"Superestrella" (2025)

Music video
- "6 de febrero" on YouTube

"6 de febrero" (stylized in all caps; transl. "6 February") is a song recorded by Spanish singer Aitana. The song was released on 6 May 2025 through Universal Music, as the third single from her fourth studio album, Cuarto azul (2025).

== Background and composition ==
Aitana began writing the song between Los Angeles and Miami, after finishing her world tour, Alpha Tour, and the cancellation of her concerts at the Bernabéu stadium. "6 de febrero" was produced by Andrés Torres, Mauricio Rengifo, and Nicolás Cotton, with lyrics written by Aitana herself, along with Torres and Rengifo.

In the Netflix documentary, Aitana: Metamorphosis, released in February 2025, the artist herself shows the creative process and early drafts of the song, also mentioning that it was written after her second breakup with Sebastián Yatra. In one of the episodes, a clip is shown of Aitana singing the song in a car, a video that quickly went viral and became one of her most acclaimed songs. Despite its success on social media, the singer decided not to release it immediately.

It was not until 2 May 2025, that Aitana posted a promotional poster on her Instagram that read, "This year, 6th May is 6th February." This announced the song's release for Tuesday, 6 May. On the same night of the premiere, in a live video on Instagram, the artist commented that she had not planned to release it as a single from the album, but rather to make it the album's focus track.

== Music video ==
In April 2025 Aitana traveled to the Dominican Republic, where she was seen on a recording set. On 5 May 2025, three days after its official announcement, Aitana shared a teaser for the music video of "6 de febrero" on social media. The video was released on 6 May, simultaneously with the song on digital platforms. Directed by Alfonso Riera and Joaquín Luna, it features a 90s aesthetic, with images of the singer enjoying moments with friends and reflecting on her past, after an apparent breakup.

== Charts ==
Chart (2025)	Peak position
Argentina (Argentina Hot 100)	27
Argentina (Monitor Latino)	3
Honduras (Monitor Latino)	7
Paraguay (Pop Monitor Latino)	7
Peru (Pop Monitor Latino)	16
Spain (PROMUSICAE)	2
Uruguay (Monitor Latino)	15

== Certifications ==
Region	Certification	Certified units/sales
Spain (Promusicae)	2× Platinum	200,000^{‡}
^{‡} Sales+streaming figures based on certification alone.
