= Alpha (Aitana album) =

Studio album by Aitana
- Released: 22 September 2023
- Recorded: January–February 2023
- Studios: Burbank (Heavy Duty); Hollywood (Orange Grove)
- Genres: Electropop; dance; house; dance pop; pop
- Length: 39:16
- Label: Universal Spain
- Producers: Andrés Torres; Mauricio Rengifo; Big One; Mr. Naisgai; Kuinvi; Orlando Vitto; Renzo Bravo

Aitana chronology
| 11 Razones (2020) | Alpha (2023) | Cuarto azul (2025) |

Singles from Alpha
- 1. "Los Ángeles" Released: 30 March 2023; 2. "Las Babys" Released: 7 June 2023; 3. "Mi Amor" Released: 24 August 2023; 4. "AQYNE" Released: 20 October 2023

Alpha (stylized as αlpha) is the third studio album by Spanish singer Aitana. It was released on 22 September 2023 by Universal Spain, almost three years after its predecessor 11 Razones (2020). For this new project, the singer enlisted habitual producers Andrés Torres and Mauricio Rengifo, besides Big One, Mr. Naisgai, Kuinvi, Orlando Vitto and Renzo Bravo, to create an electronic and dance music-centered album that would make her explore new fields and break away from her usual pop sound without completely abandoning it. She describes Alpha as her "journey towards the light, with stories of resilience, hope, and love". Primarily an electropop record, Alpha is characterized by themes of sensuality and empowerment, and features guests vocals by Danna Paola, Nicki Nicole, and Rels B.

Three singles have been released from the album so far: "Los Ángeles", the lead single, was released on 30 March 2023, and peaked at number three on the Spanish PROMUSICAE chart. It was followed by "Las Babys", and "Mi Amor", which peaked at number six and nine respectively. Alpha also contains Aitana's 2021 standalone single "Formentera", and "En el Coche" in its standard tracklist, which served "as a bridge between the previous and the actual era" at the time. And both peaked among the Spanish top 10 singles chart.

== Background and conception ==
After the release of her highly successful sophomore pop rock album 11 Razones in late 2020, Aitana revealed to the press that she had "some ideas in mind" for her upcoming record but nothing strictly planned besides going on tour. The following year she released "Berlín", which was initially promoted as the first single of her third studio album, which was set to be released the following year. Aitana stated to Los40 that her newest album would be more reggaeton-orientated, more urbano, with little-to-no ballads, and filled with vocal collaborations. During 2022, the singer released multiple standalone singles, including "En el Coche", "Quieres", and "Otra Vez", while also participating in recorded duets with Amaia, Moderatto, Pablo Alborán, and Zzoilo among others. She also played the lead role of Candela in the Disney+ original series Our Only Chance, for which she also recorded the soundtrack.

On March 2, 2023, Aitana began teasing a new musical era, and released a trailer on YouTube one day after featuring the song "Alpha09". Three weeks later, she announced "Los Ángeles" as the lead single of her new album, an electropop song with house and techno influences that dissociated from her traditional pop sound. She premiered the song at a limited DJ-ing event in Madrid, the Alpha House, which she hosted. The event later traveled to Mexico City.

The release date and cover art for Alpha were revealed on 29 August, while the tracklist was announced on 8 September.

== Recording ==
After the release of "Los Ángeles", Aitana revealed that Alpha was recorded in "a little over the course of two months" after a trip to the city of Los Angeles in January 2023 as she "felt like the songs I had recorded didn't have a line and because of things that happen in people's lives, when I traveled to L.A. last January, I wrote a totally new album", thus discarting the material of the "more urbano-driven" album she was recording in 2021. She also stated that she "wanted to make an album that could be played in a club, something different that mainstream reggaeton, which I enjoy, but something different".

== Release and promotion ==
The singer unveiled the cover artwork of Alpha via Instagram and Twitter on 29 August 2023, as well as the album release date. Pre-order started the following day. A collection of different limited coloured vinyl LPs was sold through selected distributors. A dark green LP was sold exclusively by El Corte Inglés, a baby blue one by La Casa del Disco, a pink one by Amazon, and a standard purple one was available through her fan club. Alpha was also released as a standard black vinyl, a cassette, a CD, and a limited box set for those who purchased the 'Alpha VIP ticket' for the upcoming tour in Spain and Latin America.

During release week, Aitana previewed selected songs on TikTok, including "2 Extraños" and "Dararí". As for live performances, the singer embarked on a three-date festival tour in June 2023 that visited Madrid, Santiago de Compostela, and Santander. Aitana also offered a showcase private concert at Joy Eslava in Madrid, sponsored by Los40. She also performed a medley at the Kids' Choice Awards, in Mexico. To further promote the album, Aitana is scheduled to embark on an arena tour, the Alpha Tour, across Spain and Latin America, commencing October 2023.

== Track listing ==
Alpha track listing
| No. | Title | Writer(s) | Producer(s) | Length |
|---|---|---|---|---|
| 1. | "Alpha09" | Aitana Ocaña; Andrés Torres; Mauricio Rengifo | Andrés Torres; Mauricio Rengifo | 1:02 |
| 2. | "Los Ángeles" | Ocaña; Torres; Rengifo | Torres; Rengifo | 2:38 |
| 3. | "Las Babys" | Ocaña; Torres; Rengifo; Alfredo Pignagnoli; Davide Riva | Torres; Rengifo | 2:33 |
| 4. | "Dararí" | Ocaña; Joaquina; Valentina López | Kuinvi | 2:50 |
| 5. | "AQYNE" (with Danna Paola) | Ocaña; Torres; Rengifo; Danna Paola; Álex Hoyer | Torres; Rengifo | 3:01 |
| 6. | "Ella Bailaba" | Ocaña; Torres; Rengifo | Torres; Rengifo | 2:46 |
| 7. | "Otra Noche Sin Ti" | Ocaña; Álex Capdevila; Samantha Cámara; Luis J. González Maldonado | Mr. Naisgai | 1:34 |
| 8. | "The Killers" | Ocaña; Benjamín López Barrios; Daniel Ismael Real | Big One | 3:00 |
| 9. | "Mi Amor" (with Rels B) | Ocaña; Torres; Rengifo; Daniel Heredia | Torres; Rengifo | 2:39 |
| 10. | "Luna" | Ocaña; Lasso; Orlando Vitto; Renzo Bravo | Vitto; Bravo | 3:42 |
| 11. | "Formentera" (with Nicki Nicole) | Ocaña; Torres; Rengifo; Nicole Cucco | Torres; Rengifo | 3:26 |
| 12. | "2 Extraños" | Ocaña; Torres; Rengifo | Torres; Rengifo | 3:01 |
| 13. | "24 Rosas" | Ocaña; Torres; Rengifo | Torres; Rengifo | 2:47 |
| 14. | "En el Coche" | Ocaña; Torres; Rengifo | Torres; Rengifo | 2:04 |
| 15. | "Pensando en Ti" | Ocaña; Torres; Rengifo | Torres; Rengifo | 2:13 |
| Total length: | | | | 39:16 |

=== Notes ===
- All track titles are stylized in sentence case besides "Las Babys" and "AQYNE", which are stylized in all caps.
- "Mi Amor" is stylized as "miamor".

Sample credits

- "Las Babys" interpolates "Saturday Night" (1992), written by Larry Pignagnoli and Davide Riva, as performed by Whigfield.
- "Pensando en Ti" includes a sample of "Teléfono" (2018), performed by Altana.

== Personnel ==
Musicians

- Aitana – vocals
- Mauricio Rengifo – additional vocals, keyboards, programming (5, 6, 9, 11–15)
- Andrés Torres – guitar, keyboards, programming (5, 6, 9, 11–15)
- Danna Paola – vocals (5)
- Rels B – vocals (9)
- Nicki Nicole – vocals (11)

Technical

- Tom Norris – mastering, mixing, immersive mix engineering
- Andrés Torres – engineering (1–3, 5, 9, 11–15), recording arrangement (12, 15)
- Mauricio Rengifo – engineering (1–3, 5, 9, 11–15), recording arrangement (12, 15)
- Calina – engineering, vocal engineering (4, 6, 7, 10)
- Pamela Velez – engineering (4)
- Camila Bravo – engineering (10)
- Carlos Brandi – engineering (10)
- Orlando Vitto – engineering (10)
- Renzo Bravo – engineering (10)
- Andrés Texias – additional engineering (9)
- Camilo Aristizábal – additional engineering (9)

== Charts ==
=== Weekly charts ===
Weekly chart performance for Alpha
| Chart (2023) | Peak position |
|---|---|
| Spanish Albums (Promusicae) | 1 |

=== Year-end charts ===
Year-end chart performance for Alpha
| Chart (2023) | Position |
|---|---|
| Spanish Albums (PROMUSICAE) | 5 |
| Chart (2024) | Position |
| Spanish Albums (PROMUSICAE) | 7 |

== Certifications ==
Certifications for Alpha
| Region | Certification | Certified units/sales |
|---|---|---|
| Spain (Promusicae) | 3× Platinum | 120,000^{‡} |
^{‡} Sales+streaming figures based on certification alone.

== Release history ==
Release history and formats for Alpha
| Country | Date | Format | Label | Ref. |
|---|---|---|---|---|
| Various | 22 September 2023 | Digital download; streaming; CD; cassette; box set; LP | Universal Spain | |
