= Naomi Siegmann =

American artist

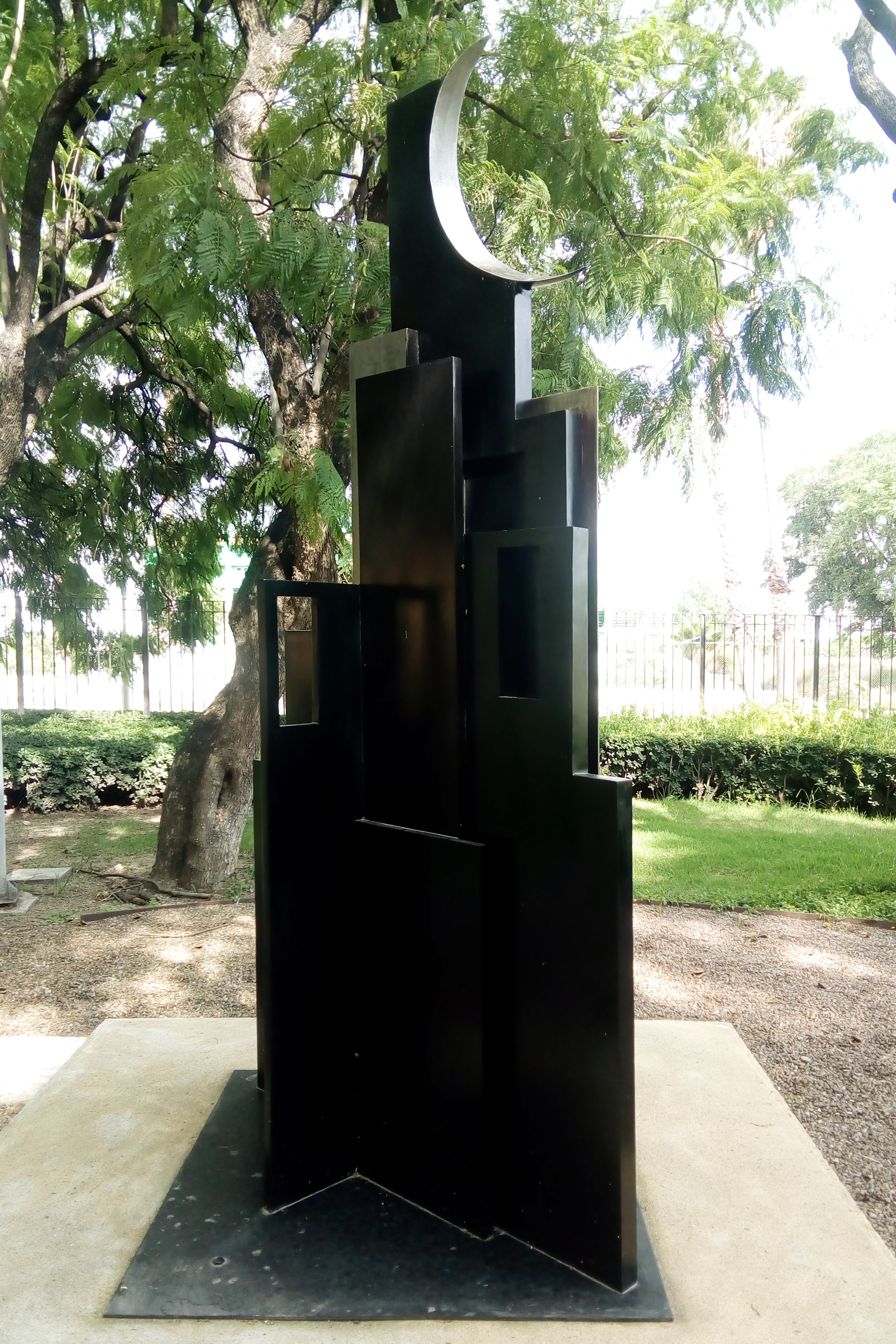
City at Night, an artwork by Siegmann in Guanajuato.

Naomi Siegmann (1933 – 28 February 2018) was an American artist who developed her career in Mexico, and was noted for her depiction of everyday objects outside their normal contexts. She began her career after she moved to Mexico with her family, learning to carve wood. She worked in this medium for about twenty years, before moving on to other materials, including recycled ones, in part due to her concerns for the environment. During her career, she had solo exhibits in Mexico and the United States, with participation in collective exhibits in these countries and Europe. She has been commissioned to create monumental works in Mexico and the United States. Her work has been recognized through membership in the Salón de la Plástica Mexicana.

== Life ==
Siegmann was born in New York in 1933. In 1960, she moved with her husband and two small children to the small town of Santa Rosa de Múzquiz in Coahuila because of her husband's work in mining. After reading many books, she decided she needed to do something with her hands, so she started as a self-taught clay modeling. Later she learned basic wood-carving procedures from her sister.

She went back to Mexico City for a 5-year contract his husband was attached to, but this would be her definitive decision because they stayed living in Mexico from then on.

Her first artistic training was in the Mexico City's workshop of sculptor Tosia Malamud, which was later complemented with a workshop with Enrique Miralda and travels to East Africa, Japan, South America and Europe. She has since lived and worked in Mexico.

She died on February 28, 2018, in Mexico City due to pneumonia complications. A few weeks before her death she had suffered a fall and a broken hip, and she could not fully recover from a lung deficiency.

== Career ==
Siegmann has developed her career mostly in Mexico. Her individual exhibits have included those at the Centro Cultural Tamaulipas (2013), the Centro Médico Nacional Siglo XXI (2013), the Centro Cultural Isidro Fabela (Casa del Risco) in Mexico City (2003/4,2011,2012), the Centro Nacional de las Artes in Mexico City (2011), the Canal Street Gallery in Houston (2010), the Instituto Cultural de México in San Antonio (2010), the Atrium of the San Francisco Church in the historic center of Mexico City (2009), the Museo Universitario Leopoldo Flores in Toluca (2009), the Centro Cultural Estación Indianilla in Mexico City (2008), the Museo Federico Silva in San Luis Potosí (2007), the Museo de Arte Contemporáneo de Yucatán in Mérida (2005), Museo de Arte Contemporáneo in Aguascalientes (1996), Museo de Arte Carrillo Gil in Mexico City (1995), the Benito Juarez Airport Gallery (1992/3), the Galería López Quiroga in Mexico City (1988, 1991), the Museo Universitario del Chopo in Mexico City (1991), Centro Cultural Mexiquense in Toluca (1990), Galería de Arte Mexicano in Mexico City (1982), Swope Gallery in Los Angeles (1982) and the Museo de Arte Moderno in Mexico City (1979). She has also participated in more than seventy-five collective exhibitions in Mexico, the United States and Europe.

From 2001 to 2006, Siegmann organized and coordinated an artistic and ecological project called El Bosque/The Forest in four cities in Mexico and four in the United States. This project was in collaboration with fourteen other sculptures to create trees from any material other than wood, to promote forestation.

In 2010 she won Puertas Caminos de la Justicia 200 Años of the Supreme Court of Justice of the Nation.

Her work can be found in the collections of the Museo de Arte Moderno, the National Autonomous University of Mexico, the Rotunda of Illustrious Persons in Mexico City, the FEMSA collection in Monterrey, Aldrich Contemporary Art Museum in Connecticut, the Museo de Arte Contemporáneo in Morelia, the Olin F. Featherstone Museum in Roswell, NM, the Whitken Gallery in New York, the Yad Vashem Museum in Jerusalem, the Cuban-Hebrew Congregation in Miami, the PepsiCo collection in New York, the Secretaría de Relaciones Exteriores of Mexico, the José Luis Cuevas Museum in Mexico City, and the Reyes Meza Museum in Nuevo Laredo. Her work has also appeared in publications such as XX Century Dictionary of Mexican Sculpture (1984), Naomi Siegmann (1985), Art News (1992), Mexico in the World of Art Collections (1994), Collection: Pay in Kind (1992–93), A Vision of México and its Artists (2002) and Naomi Siegmann (2014)

She is a member of the Salón de la Plástica Mexicana.

== Artistry ==
Siegmann began carving wood in the 1970s and worked with it for about twenty years. In the 1990s, she began to experiment with metal, working with discarded molds from a local factory along with another artist named Inmaculada Barca. The switch was not only prompted by interest in other materials, but also because she was concerned that her use of wood contributed to deforestation. Since this time she has worked with bronze, steel and paper and more recently with recycled and found materials. Much of her work since the 2000s has been working with plants and trees, stemming from thoughts about ecology and human survival.

As she developed her art in the country of Mexico, her work has absorbed Mexican colors and culture in her work, including pre-Hispanic art and history. Much of her work is a depiction of a real, everyday object, taken outside its normal context to prompt the viewer to see it differently. Her works have been called "hyper realistic" (she has also called it “abstracted realism”), with the idea that although they are static and rigid sculptures, they depict all the movement and shape of the real thing. For example, a sculpted draped towel will have all the folds of a real one, but it does not move. In a series called “Clothesline,” Mexican indigenous clothing hangs and looks as if it is blowing in a breeze.

In the new millennium she developed installations like "Realidad Alterada" ("Altered Reality" 2011), a garden made of recycled tires, or "Lluvia de jacarandas" ("Seed Rain", 2003), representing a rain of jacaranda seeds, both pieces made in measures that can be adapted to big spaces of variable dimensions.

Most of her work is life-sized but she has created monumental works in steel and bronze, along with a mural at the National Auditorium in Mexico City. These have included a welded steel dinosaur for the Papalote Children's Museum, a steel piece for the grounds of Mt. Grey High School in Williamstown, Massachusetts, and two six-meter abstract works for the ABC Hospital and the Universidad Autonoma Metropolitana Unidad Azcapotzalco in Mexico City.
