= Alpha Tour =

2023–2024 concert tour by Aitana

αlpha Tour
- Tour by Aitana
- Poster for the Spanish leg of the tour
- Location: Europe; North America; South America
- Associated album: Alpha
- Start date: October 1, 2023
- End date: August 4, 2024
- Legs: 5
- No. of shows: 33
- Supporting acts: Soulfia; Clara Cava; Agustina Giovio
- Producer: GTS Management
- Attendance: 590,000 (27 shows)

Aitana concert chronology
- 11 Razones Tour (2021–2022); Alpha Tour (2023–2024); Metamorfosis Season (2025)

Alpha Tour (stylized as αlpha Tour) was the third concert tour by Spanish singer Aitana, launched in support of her third studio album, Alpha. The tour kicked off on October 1, 2023, in Valencia, Spain, consisting of thirty-tree shows across eight countries. It concluded on August 4, 2024, in Vigo, Spain. Alpha Tour was attended by 140,000 people from only ten shows in Spain during 2023, and by 450,000 people from seventeen shows during 2024.

== Announcements ==
Aitana initially revealed the Latin American leg of the tour through a video on her social media, announcing nine concerts and launching the “αlpha Goes Global” chapter by sharing the coordinates of each city. On June 13, she announced the Spanish leg of the tour with another Instagram video, under the slogan “αlpha no es sólo un tour.” That same day, posters featuring the "αlpha" logo and a QR code appeared on the streets of the cities where she would perform. The QR code led to a page listing the concert dates. Two days later, Aitana officially posted the first set of Spanish tour dates via Instagram. On June 21, additional shows in Madrid and Barcelona were added due to high demand. On July 18, she announced a third and final date in Madrid.

On July 19, through TikTok and Twitter, Aitana announced the dress code for the first leg of the tour. Later, during her concert in Madrid on December 5, she revealed what would become the final show of the tour, set to take place at the Santiago Bernabéu Stadium.

In 2024, on March 21, she announced the festival leg of the tour, which included appearances at festivals in Mexico, Spain, and Portugal. On May 14, she announced a second date at the Bernabéu, once again due to overwhelming demand. However, on September 13, following noise complaints from local residents, all concerts at the Bernabéu Stadium were rescheduled to March 2025, with Aitana’s shows moved to June 27 and 28, 2025.

In 2025, during the airing of her Netflix documentary Metamorfosis, Aitana discussed her inability to “extend the Alpha era into 2025.” Later, on February 2, in an interview with Los40, she spoke about her upcoming Bernabéu concerts, describing them as "a compilation of everything we’ve experienced." Finally, on March 17, the Metamorfosis Season was officially announced — Aitana’s next major tour, which was supposed to include her two sold-out shows at the Bernabéu.

== Setlist ==
=== 2023 ===
This set list is from the concert in Valencia on October 1, 2023.

1. "Alpha09" (Intro)
2. "Los Ángeles"
3. "2 Extraños"
4. "Berlín"
5. "Dararí"
6. "AQYNE"
7. "En el coche"
8. "= (Igual)"
9. "No te has ido y ya te extraño"
10. "Luna"
11. "+ (Más)"
12. "Tu foto del DNI"
13. "Mon Amour (Remix)"
14. "miamor"
15. "24 Rosas" (includes elements of "Children")
16. "Ella bailaba"
17. "Quieres"
18. "Mariposas" (includes elements of "Freed from Desire")
19. "Con la miel en los labios"
20. "The Killers"
21. "Pensando en ti" (includes elements of "Sweet Dreams (Are Made of This)" and "Flying Free")
22. "Otra noche sin ti"
23. "Vas a quedarte"
24. "Las Babys"
25. "Formentera"

=== 2024 ===
This set list is from the concert in Pontevedra, July 5, 2024.

1. "Alpha09" (Intro)
2. "Los Ángeles"
3. "2 Extraños"
4. "Berlín"
5. "Dararí"
6. "AQYNE"
7. "En el coche (Remix)"
8. "= (Igual)"
9. "No te has ido y ya te extraño"
10. "+ (Más)"
11. "Tu Foto Del DNI"
12. "4TO 23"
13. "Mon Amour (Remix)"
14. "miamor"
15. "24 Rosas" (includes elements of "Children")
16. "Hermosa Casualidad"
17. "Quieres"
18. "Mariposas" (includes elements of "Freed from Desire")
19. "Vas a quedarte"
20. "Pensando en ti" (includes elements of "Sweet Dreams (Are Made of This)" and "Flying Free")
21. "Akureyri"
22. "Las Babys"
23. "Formentera"

== Dates ==
List of 2023 concerts.
Date (2023)	City	Country	Venue	Opening acts	Attendance	Revenue
October 1	Valencia	Spain	City of Arts and Sciences	—N/a	11,911 / 12,000	$763,713
October 7	Málaga	Spain	Municipal Auditorium of Málaga	—N/a	6,935 / 7,000	$484,570
October 12	Barcelona	Spain	Palau Sant Jordi	—N/a	33,793 / 33,793	$1,918,929
October 13	Barcelona	Spain	Palau Sant Jordi	—N/a	33,793 / 33,793	$1,918,929
October 20	Las Palmas	Spain	Gran Canaria Arena	—N/a	—	—
October 28	Seville	Spain	Estadio de La Cartuja	—N/a	19,205 / 19,220	$1,061,957
November 1	Bilbao	Spain	Bizkaia Arena	—N/a	14,184 / 14,500	$810,873
November 6	Madrid	Spain	Wizink Center	—N/a	30,495 / 31,566	$1,997,282
November 7	Madrid	Spain	Wizink Center	—N/a	30,495 / 31,566	$1,997,282
November 24	Mexico City	Mexico	Auditorio Nacional	—N/a	8,091 / 9,000	$435,901
November 26	Bogotá	Colombia	Movistar Arena	—N/a	3,149 / 5,772	—
November 28	Lima	Peru	Parque de la Exposición	—N/a	—	—
December 5	Madrid	Spain	Wizink Center	—N/a	15,426 / 15,783	$1,010,332
December 13	Santiago	Chile	Movistar Arena	Soulfia	—	—
December 18	Buenos Aires	Argentina	Movistar Arena	Clara Cava	8,946 / 11,684	—
December 20	Montevideo	Uruguay	Antel Arena	Agustina Giovio	2,291 / 5,123	$140,487

List of 2024 concerts.
Date (2024)	City	Country	Venue	Attendance	Revenue
March 29 (Note: This is part of Tecate Pa'l Norte festival.) (Note: Billed as alphaTour2024.)	Monterrey	Mexico	Fundidora Park	—N/a	
May 18 (Note: This is part of Tecate Emblema festival.)	Mexico City	Mexico	Autódromo Hermanos Rodríguez	—N/a	
June 7	Seville	Spain	Plaza de España	9,789 / 18,000	$576,196
June 9 (Note: This is part of Share Festival.)	Barcelona	Spain	Parc del Fòrum	—N/a	
June 15 (Note: This is part of Mallorca Live Festival.)	Calvià	Spain	Aquapark	—N/a	
June 22	Marbella	Spain	Cantera de Nagüeles Auditorium	2,714 / 3,343	$198,594
June 23 (Note: This is part of Rock in Rio Lisboa.)	Lisbon	Portugal	Tejo Park	—N/a	
June 28 (Note: This is part of Bigsound festival.)	Valencia	Spain	City of Arts and Sciences	—N/a	
July 5 (Note: This is part of Portamérica festival.)	Pontevedra	Spain	Portas Sugar Factory	—N/a	
July 12	Chiclana de la Frontera	Spain	Islote de Sancti Petri	5,764 / 6,700	$467,013
July 14	Roquetas de Mar	Spain	Municipal Antonio Peroles Stadium	8,037 / 16,700	$547,696
July 19 (Note: This is part of Cook Music Fest.)	Santa Cruz de Tenerife	Spain	Port of Santa Cruz de Tenerife	—N/a	
July 27 (Note: This is part of Morriña Fest.)	A Coruña	Spain	Port of La Coruña	—N/a	
July 29	Marbella	Spain	Cantera de Nagüeles Auditorium	2,256 / 3,343	$135,546
July 30	Marbella	Spain	Cantera de Nagüeles Auditorium	2,141 / 3,343	$110,682
August 1 (Note: This is part of Arenal Sound festival.)	Burriana	Spain	Port of Burriana	—N/a	
August 3	Vigo	Spain	Castrelos Park	—N/a	

=== Canceled shows ===
Date	City	Country	Venue	Reason
November 30, 2023	Quito	Ecuador	Casa de la Cultura Ecuatoriana	Logistics conflicts
December 15, 2023	Córdoba	Argentina	Plaza de la Música	Logistics conflicts
December 16, 2023	Rosario	Argentina	Anfiteatro Municipal Humberto de Nito	Logistics conflicts
December 28, 2024	Madrid	Spain	Santiago Bernabeu Stadium	Legal complaint over the noise
December 29, 2024	Madrid	Spain	Santiago Bernabeu Stadium	Legal complaint over the noise
