= Cuando hables con él =

2025 song by Aitana

Song by Aitana

from the album Cuarto azul
- Language: Spanish
- English title: "When you talk to him"
- Released: 30 May 2025
- Genre: Latin pop
- Length: 3:05
- Label: Universal Music
- Songwriters: Aitana Ocaña; Andrés Torres; Mauricio Rengifo
- Producers: Andrés Torres; Mauricio Rengifo; Tom Norris

Music video
- "Cuando hables con él" on YouTube

"Cuando hables con él" (transl. "When you talk to him") is a song recorded by Spanish singer Aitana. The song was released on 30 May 2025 through Universal Music, as a focus track of her fourth studio album, Cuarto azul (2025).

== Background and composition ==
Aitana first played this song during her listening party at the Movistar Arena in Madrid on 27 May 2025. That same day, she announced that this song would be the focus track of the album.

"Cuando hables con él" was written by Aitana, Andrés Torres, and Mauricio Rengifo, and produced by Torres and Rengifo. In the lyrics of the ballad, Aitana asks a third person to talk to her first love.

On 29 May 2025, she announced that the song would be accompanied by a music video directed by Jose Ocaña, which was also released on the same night as the launch of Cuarto azul.

== Music video ==
The video for "Cuando hables con él" was released on 30 May, simultaneously with the song and the rest of the album's tracks, on digital platforms. Directed by Jose Ocaña, the video depicts Aitana at different stages of her life, attempting to save a deteriorating room with leaks and fire, a metaphor for a past relationship that has been destroyed but is difficult to leave. The video concludes with the Catalan singer leaving the room accompanied by doves, symbolizing acceptance and closure of that chapter in her life.

Aitana is portrayed by Sofía Otero during her childhood, while Rocío Soria portrays her teenage version.

== Charts ==
| Chart (2025) | Peak position |
|---|---|
| Spain (PROMUSICAE) | 4 |

== Certifications ==
| Region | Certification | Certified units/sales |
|---|---|---|
| Spain (Promusicae) | Gold | 50,000^{‡} |
^{‡} Sales+streaming figures based on certification alone.
