= Centro Cultural Isidro Fabela =

Museum in Mexico City

Coordinates: 19.3448428°N 99.192153°W

La Casa del Risco, also known as Centro Cultural Isidro Fabela, is a museum located in front of the Plaza San Jacinto in San Angel neighborhood at southern Mexico City. The Centro was inaugurated on October 2, 1963, as a donation from Isidro Fabela and his wife, Doña Josefina de Fabela, on October 8, 1958. This historical building is destined to be a public museum of colonial art.

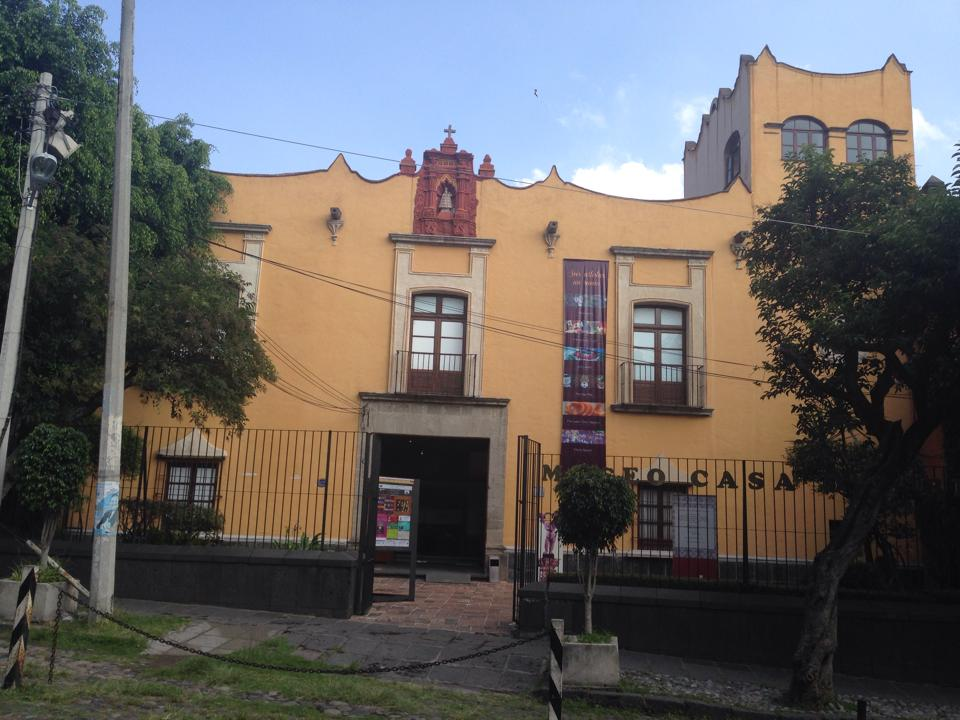
Fachada casa Risco

La Casa del Risco has Vice Royal architecture and a symmetrical façade. It is distinguished by its unique color of the 18th century, it is also decorated by a cross and a niche, which represents that it is guarded by the moon and the sun.

The interior shows the art collection that was kept by Isidro Fabela. The center has seven showrooms displaying Mexican works of art as much as other European pieces, from painting to sculptures.

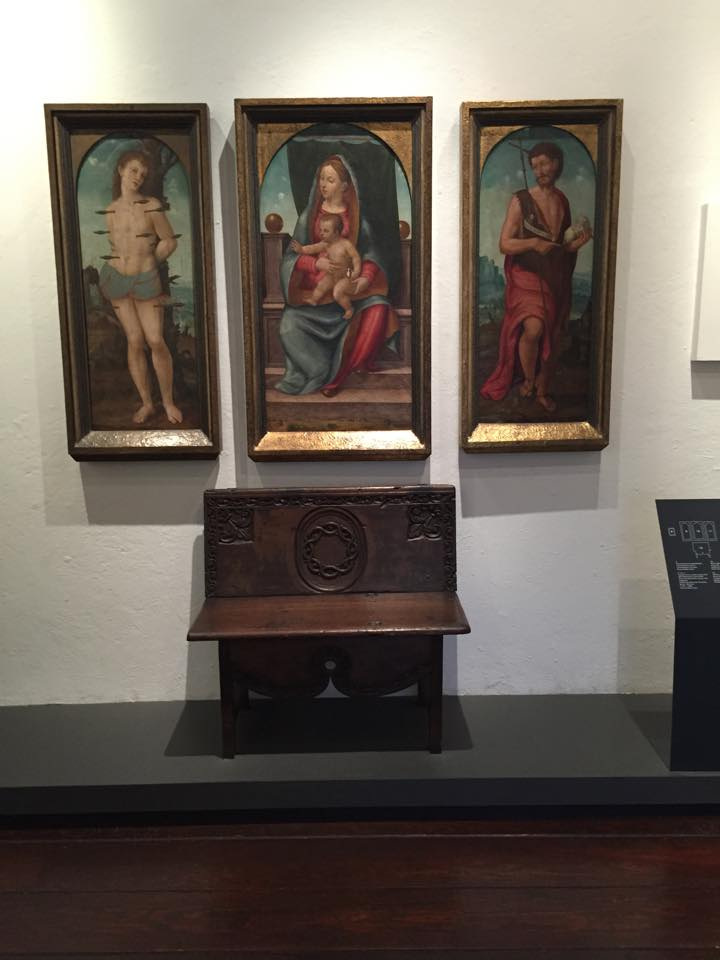
Inmuebles dentro de la exhibición

In the interior courtyard is the monumental "Fuente del Risco" from the 18th century and which author is unknown. Near "La Casa del Risco" is the library, the historical archive of the Mexican revolution, which contains Isidro's Fabela personal book collection from his post-revolution era as a politician, the photographic library and an auditorium.

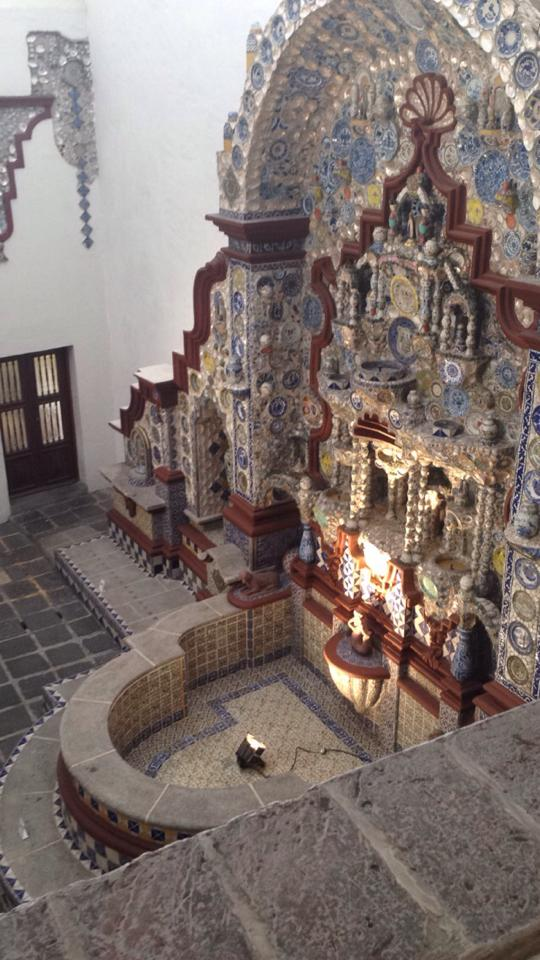
Fuente Casa Risco

== History ==
La Casa del Risco was the site of many passages throughout Mexico City history, and in some cases, participant. Its location is in center of San Ángel, its dimensions as a residence and strategic position, were some of the aspects that involved la Casa del Risco in military events like the American invasion to Mexico (1846–1848). According to the famous writer Manuel Payno, an ancient resident of this house.

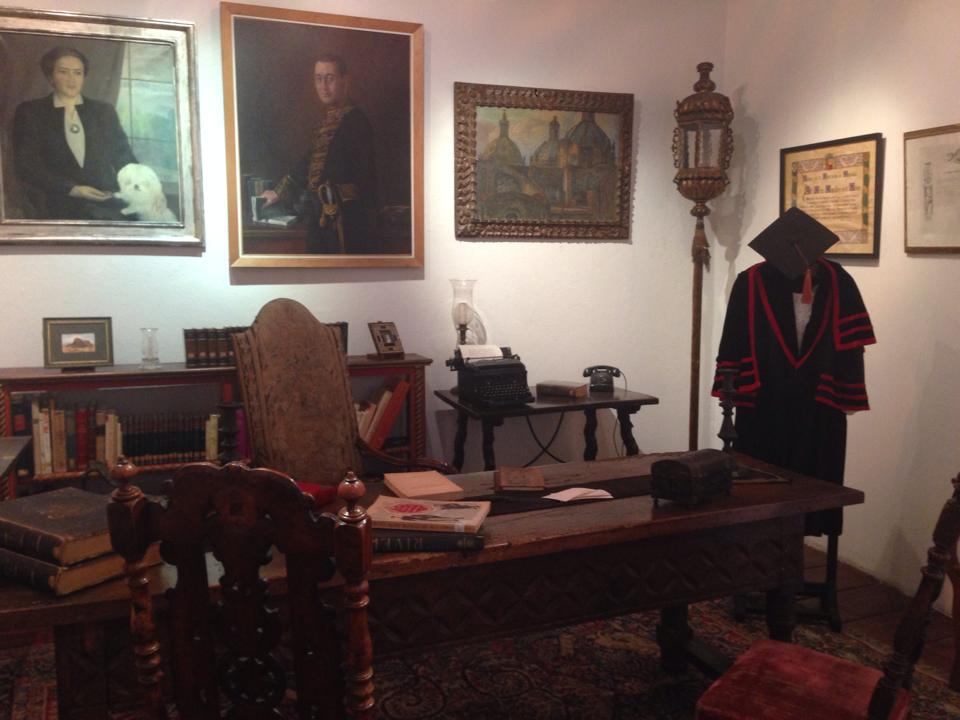
Estudio de Isidro Fabela dentro de Casa Risco

In San Angel was hosted general Antonio Lopez de Santa Anna, while the troops of general Gabriel Valencia were fighting against the American enemies which outnumbered them, while waiting for backup, even though the closeness and the fact that Santa Anna counted with the necessary resources, the General did not help, leaving them to their own luck, losing the battle. After that, in the next assault American general David Twiggs, took as a military headquarters la Casa del Risco

== Temporal Collection in 2015 ==
Among the works at Centro Cultural Isidro Fabela a collection works of artists like Julia López, Francisca de Diego and Mercedes Ortiz can be found. This exposition is intended to allow spectators to travel in different worlds and diverse expressions of colors and shapes.

=== Mercedes Ortiz Vaquero ===
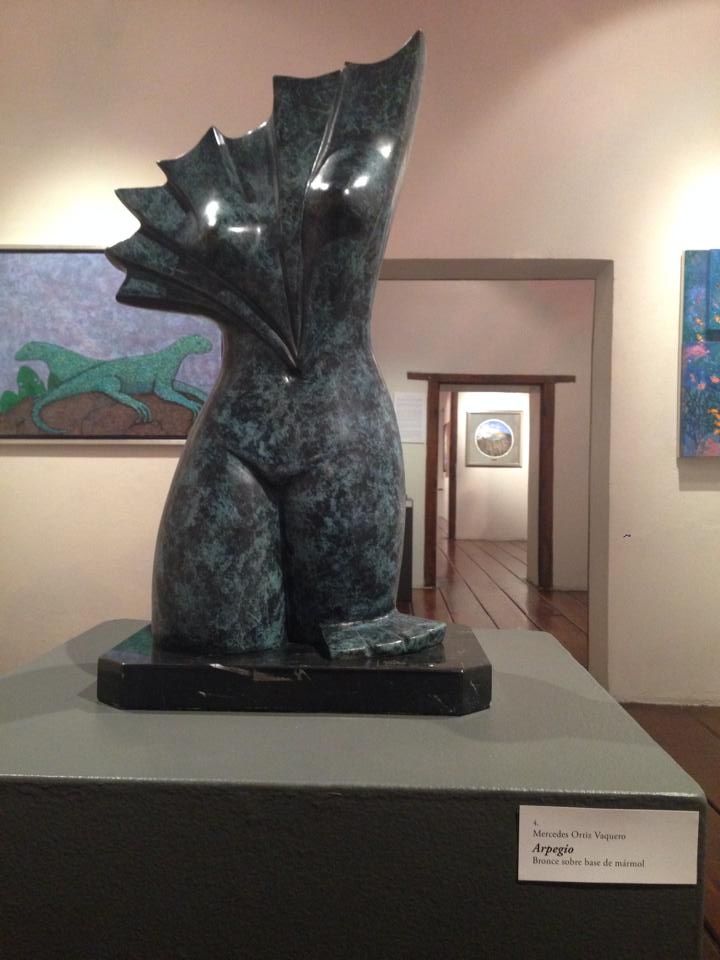
Arpegio

Mercedes Ortiz Vaquero works with different shapes, volume, texture and color. She was born in Sevilla, Spain, and emigrated to the Canary Islands after the Spanish Civil War. She arrived to Mexico around 1950 and became Mexican in 1956. Some of her artwork available in La Casa del Risco are Poesía del Mar Arpegio La Pata Tobías

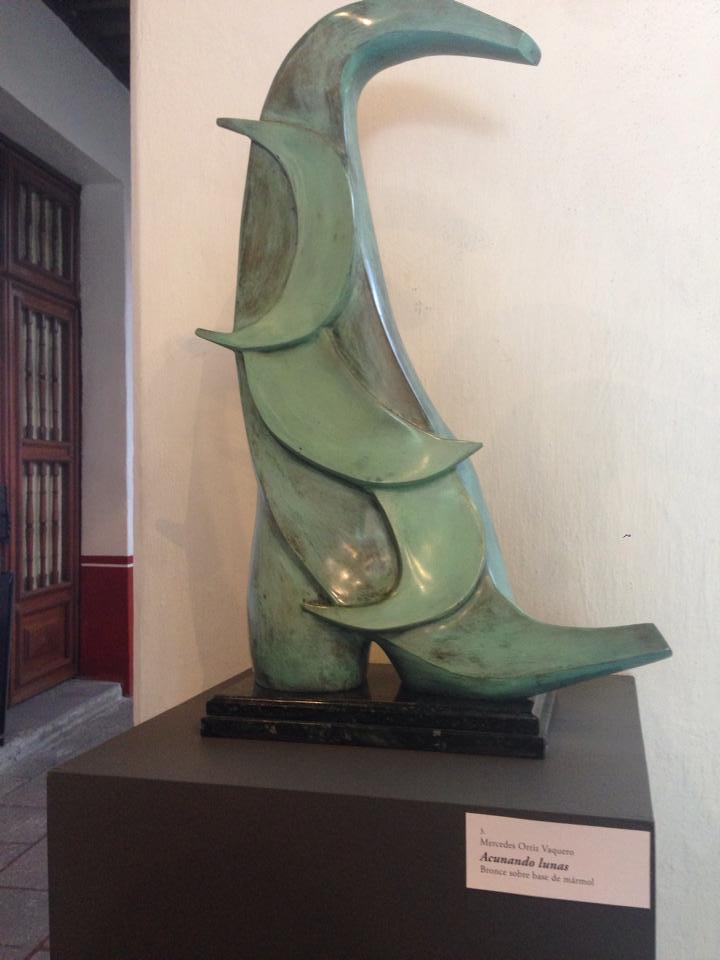
Acunando Lunas

==== Francisca de Diego ====
This artist was born in Villahermosa, Tabasco. She studied art at the Motolina University. She has more than 30 years doing paintings full of colors and cheerful shapes which move around a family context and her everyday life represented in her paintings. She has collected several awards throughout her career. Some of her work available in La Casa del Risco are:

Pueblo con Lago La Granja Pueblo Feliz Gato Rojo Lista para la foto

=== Religious European Art Showroom ===
The works of art gathered by Isidro Fabela offer a short vision of religious European art, developed in the 15th throughout 17th centuries and in which works of Corneliszen Van Oonstanen, David Tenniers, Francisco Francia are highlighted

=== Baroque Showroom ===
Vice-royal Mexican culture was soaked by Baroque art developed in the 17th century and reaching its fulfillment in the 18th, during this period the Spanish society were anxious to keep and to show their privileged status, by showing off the interior in their houses. With that same attitude Isidro Fabela and his wife gathered the collection of this showroom to enlighten la Casa del Risco.
