= Ela Taubert =

Colombian singer-songwriter (born 2000)

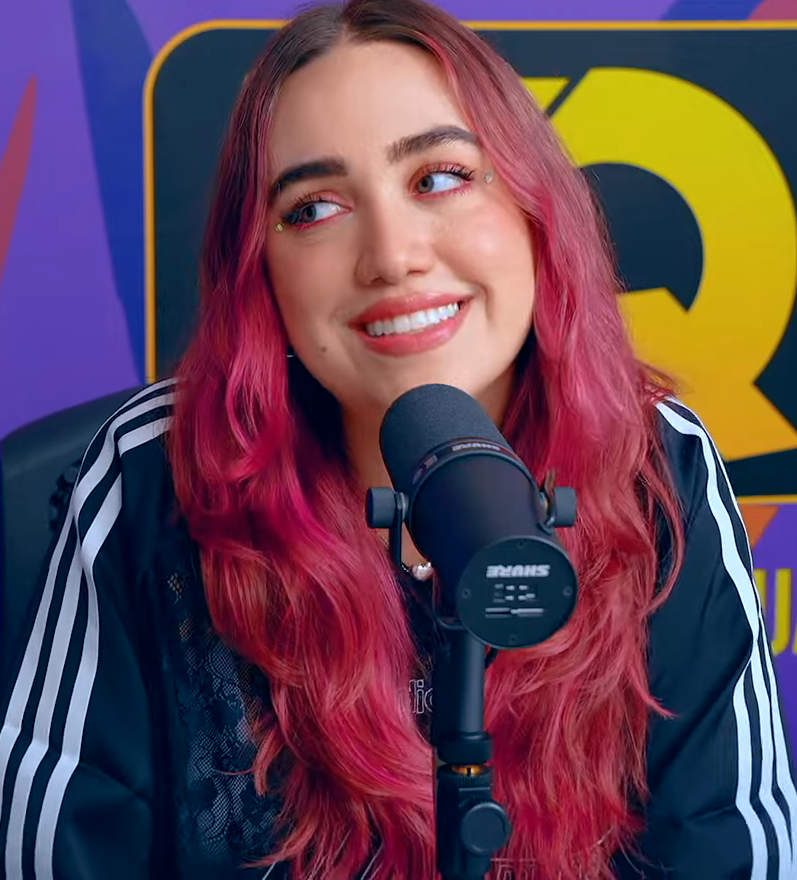
- Born: 10 September 2000 (age 25); Bogotá, Colombia
- Occupations: Singer; musician; songwriter
- Awards: Latin Grammy Award for Best New Artist 2024
- Musical career
- Genres: Latin pop
- Instruments: Vocals; piano; guitar
- Label: Universal Music Latino
- Website: www.elataubert.com

Manuela Pardo Taubert (Note: In this Spanish name, the first or paternal surname is Pardo and the second or maternal family name is Taubert.) (born 2000), known as Ela Taubert, is a Colombian singer and songwriter. Taubert won the Best New Artist award at the 25th Annual Latin Grammy Awards in 2024 and released her debut album, Preguntas a las 11:11, in 2025.

== Biography ==
Manuela Pardo Taubert was born on 10 September 2000 in Bogotá, Colombia, to Erika Taubert and Orlando Pardo.

=== Music career ===
During the COVID-19 pandemic, Taubert began sharing videos of herself covering songs on TikTok, which became popular in several Latin American countries and led to her being signed to Universal Music Latino. Taubert studied at the Abbey Road Institute in 2022 and, in 2023, released her first EP, ¿Quién dijo que era fácil?.

Taubert won the Best New Artist award at the 25th Annual Latin Grammy Awards in 2024. At the Premio Lo Nuestro 2025, Taubert won Female Pop-Rock/Urban New Artist of the Year, and her song "¿Cómo pasó?" won Pop Song of the Year. She released her debut album, Preguntas a las 11:11, in May 2025.

== Discography ==
=== Albums ===
- Preguntas a las 11:11 (2025)

=== Extended plays ===
- ¿Quién dijo que era fácil? (2023)

== Awards and nominations ==
Award ceremony	Year	Category	Work(s)	Result
Latin Grammy Awards	2024	Best New Artist	—N/a	Won
Premios Juventud	2024	The New Generation – Female	—N/a	Won
Premios Lo Nuestro	2025	Female Pop-Rock/Urban New Artist of the Year	—N/a	Won
Premios Lo Nuestro	2025	Pop Song of the Year	"¿Cómo pasó?"	Won
