= Formentera (song) =

2021 single by Aitana and Nicki Nicole

Single by Aitana and Nicki Nicole

from the album Alpha
- Language: Spanish
- Released: 3 December 2021
- Genre: Pop; dance-pop
- Length: 3:27
- Label: Universal Spain
- Songwriters: Aitana Ocaña; Nicole Cucco; Mauricio Rengifo; Andrés Torres
- Producers: Mauricio Rengifo; Andrés Torres

Aitana singles chronology
"Coldplay" (2021)	"Formentera" (2021)	"En El Coche" (2022)

Nicki Nicole singles chronology
"Otra Noche" (2021)	"Formentera" (2021)	"Entre Nosotros (Remix)" (2022)

Music video
- "Formentera" on YouTube

"Formentera" is a song by Spanish singer Aitana, in collaboration with Argentine singer Nicki Nicole, released on 3 December 2021 through Universal Music Spain. The song was later included on the track list of her third studio album, Alpha (2023), as the eleventh song on the album.

== Background ==
During an interview with Los 40 in November 2021, Nicki Nicole confirmed that she had collaborated with Aitana in a track that would be released soon. Some days later, Aitana confirmed the release date of the single and confirmed that the music video would also be dropping that same day.

== Reception ==
"The catchy melody of the song's chorus is one of the most memorable parts of the song". Soon after its release, the song was criticized by some listeners because one verse reads, "I'll fly directly to Formentera", but Formentera is an island and has no airport.

=== Commercial performance ===
The song debuted at number 76 on the Billboard Argentina Hot 100 and eventually peaked at number 57. In Spain, the song peaked at number three and was certified 5xplatinum.

== Track listing ==
Digital download
No.	Title	Length
1.	"Formentera"	3:26
Total length:		3:26

Digital download – Remixes
No.	Title	Length
1.	"Formentera" (GARABATTO RMX)	3:12
2.	"Formentera" (rusowsky rmx)	2:10
Total length:		5:22

== Charts ==
Chart (2021–2022)	Peak position
Argentina (Argentina Hot 100)	53
Argentina Airplay (Monitor Latino)	16
Bolivia (Monitor Latino)	17
Ecuador Pop (Monitor Latino)	13
Guatemala Pop (Monitor Latino)	16
Mexico Pop (Monitor Latino)	6
Panama Pop (Monitor Latino)	9
Paraguay Pop (Monitor Latino)	15
Spain (Promusicae)	3
Spain Airplay (PROMUSICAE)	1

== Certifications ==
Region	Certification	Certified units/sales
Spain (Promusicae)	7× Platinum	420,000^{‡}
^{‡} Sales+streaming figures based on certification alone.
