= Gale (singer) =

Puerto Rican singer

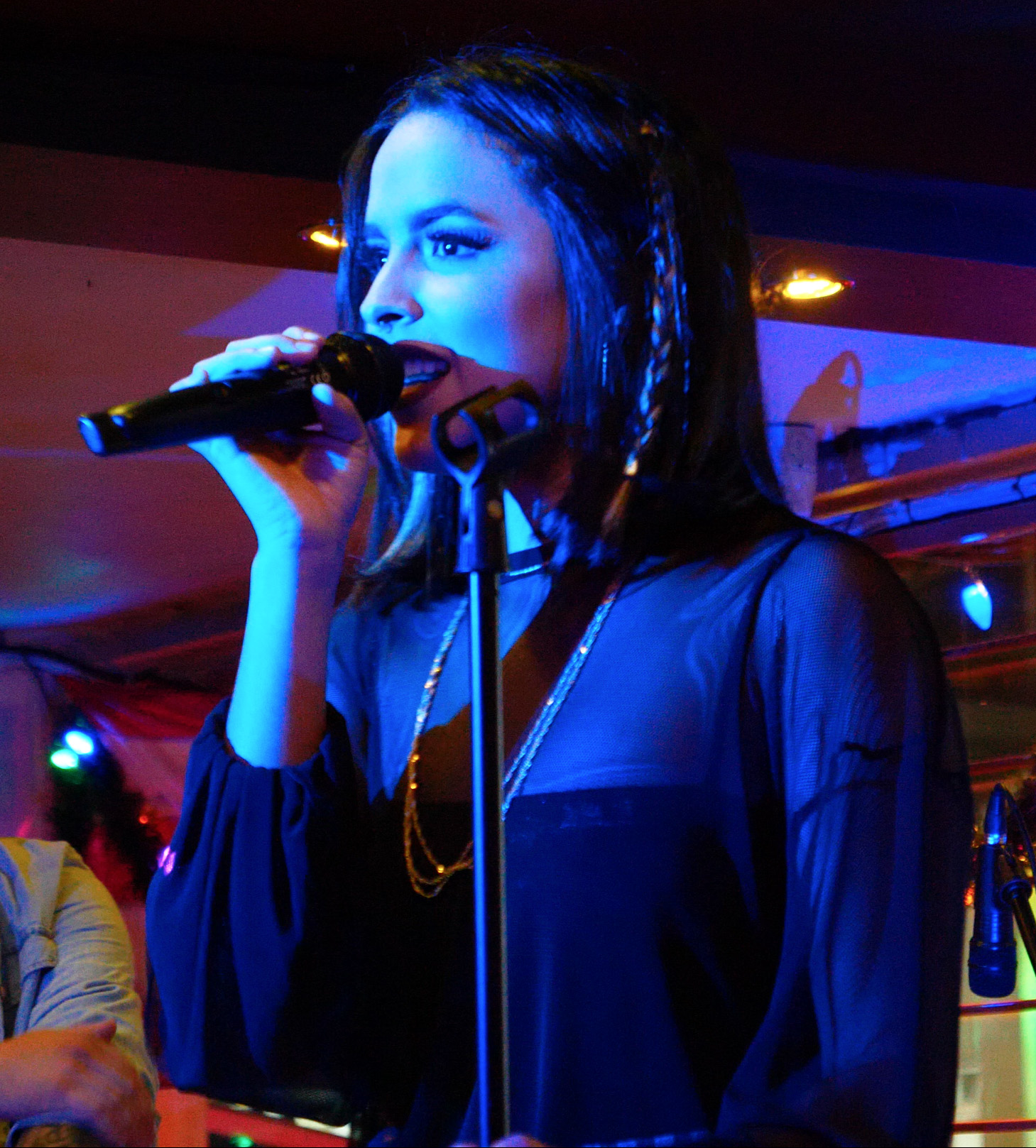
- Gale performing in 2017

Background information
- Born: Carolina Isabel Colón Juarbe; May 16, 1993 (age 33); Arecibo, Puerto Rico
- Genres: Pop; Latin pop; indie pop; blues rock
- Occupations: Singer, songwriter
- Years active: 2013–present
- Website: galeoficial.com

Carolina Isabel Colón Juarbe (born May 16, 1993), better known by her stage name Gale (pronounced gah-leh; stylized as GALE), is a Puerto Rican singer, best known for her song "Levántate", which was selected as the official song of the 2017 CONCACAF Gold Cup in Spanish by the American Spanish-language broadcast television network Univision.

== Early life and career ==
Gale was born in Arecibo, Puerto Rico on May 16, 1993, to a family of musicians. Her grandfather played the cuatro and her father is a musician and guitarist. Growing up, Gale was certain that singing and songwriting was going to be her profession in life. As a child, she imitated Christina Aguilera, Selena, and Shakira, who are some of her early musical influences, and wrote her first song at the age of 8 titled "Amor Sincero".

At the age of 12, Gale and her mother move to San Juan where she began to receive formal musical education at the Escuela Libre de Música, an academic and music school from Puerto Rico, where she specialized in guitar and classical singing and was a member of the school choir. Gale also took private lessons with locally renowned vocal coach Hilda Ramos.

During her high-school years, she begins to train in musical theatre as a member of the Black Box Theatre Workshop in Puerto Rico, later participating in the musical plays Rent, Spring Awakening, Contratiempo, and Viva Julia de Burgos. Musical theatre contributed to her stage presence and artistic development.

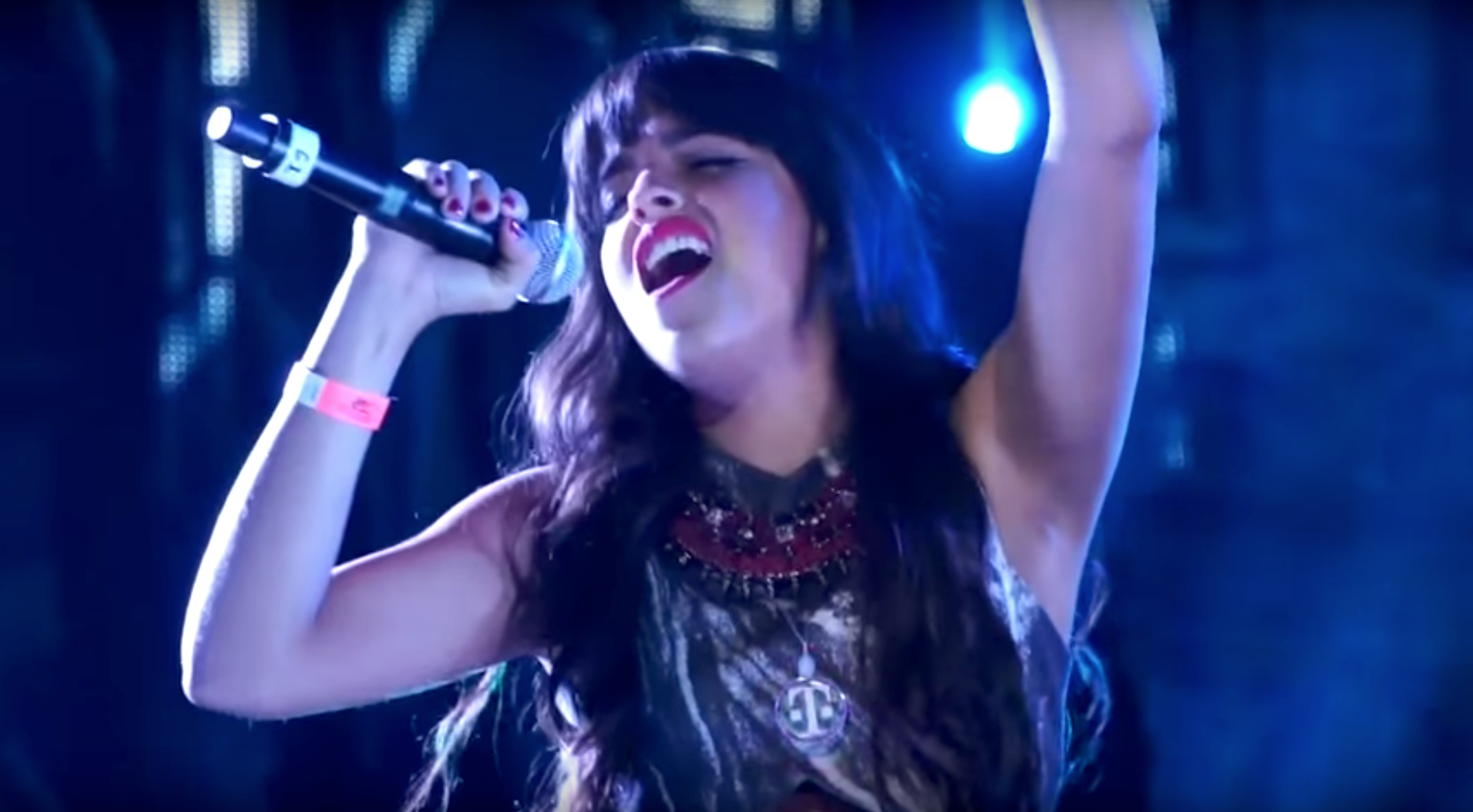
Gale sings at the Coliseo de Puerto Rico with Draco Rosa

During her college years, Gale began posting covers on her YouTube channel and singing at local gigs and festivals in Puerto Rico. One of her covers was for "Que No" a song by Puerto Rican singer Pedro Capó who, after seeing the cover, invited Gale to sing with him at one of his concerts. Gale later won a contest to sing with Draco Rosa in front of a sold-out crowd at the Coliseo de Puerto Rico.

After receiving a bachelor's degree in advertising from the University of Puerto Rico and a certification in songwriting from Berklee College of Music, Gale moved to Miami in 2016 to pursue her professional singing career and begins the production of her first single as an independent artist titled "Fantasma", an Electropop song of her composition and the production of Colombian producer Juan Andres Ceballos, a.k.a. Nito. The song was launched digitally on October 25, 2016. Soon after, she began to work on the production of her first album titled "Espirales Sin Sentido", which she funded by selling her 10-year-old SUV and an Indiegogo crowdfunding campaign.

As the album was being produced, she released two other singles of her composition: “Caramelo”, a Latin Pop track written and produced by herself and the pop ballad "Respirar" at the beginning of 2017. On June 23, 2017, Gale self-released her debut album "Espirales Sin Sentido" under her own label Blue Madness Records, a 10-song album which includes the participation of producer Juan Ceballos and Grammy Award winners Dan Warner and Felipe Tichauer.

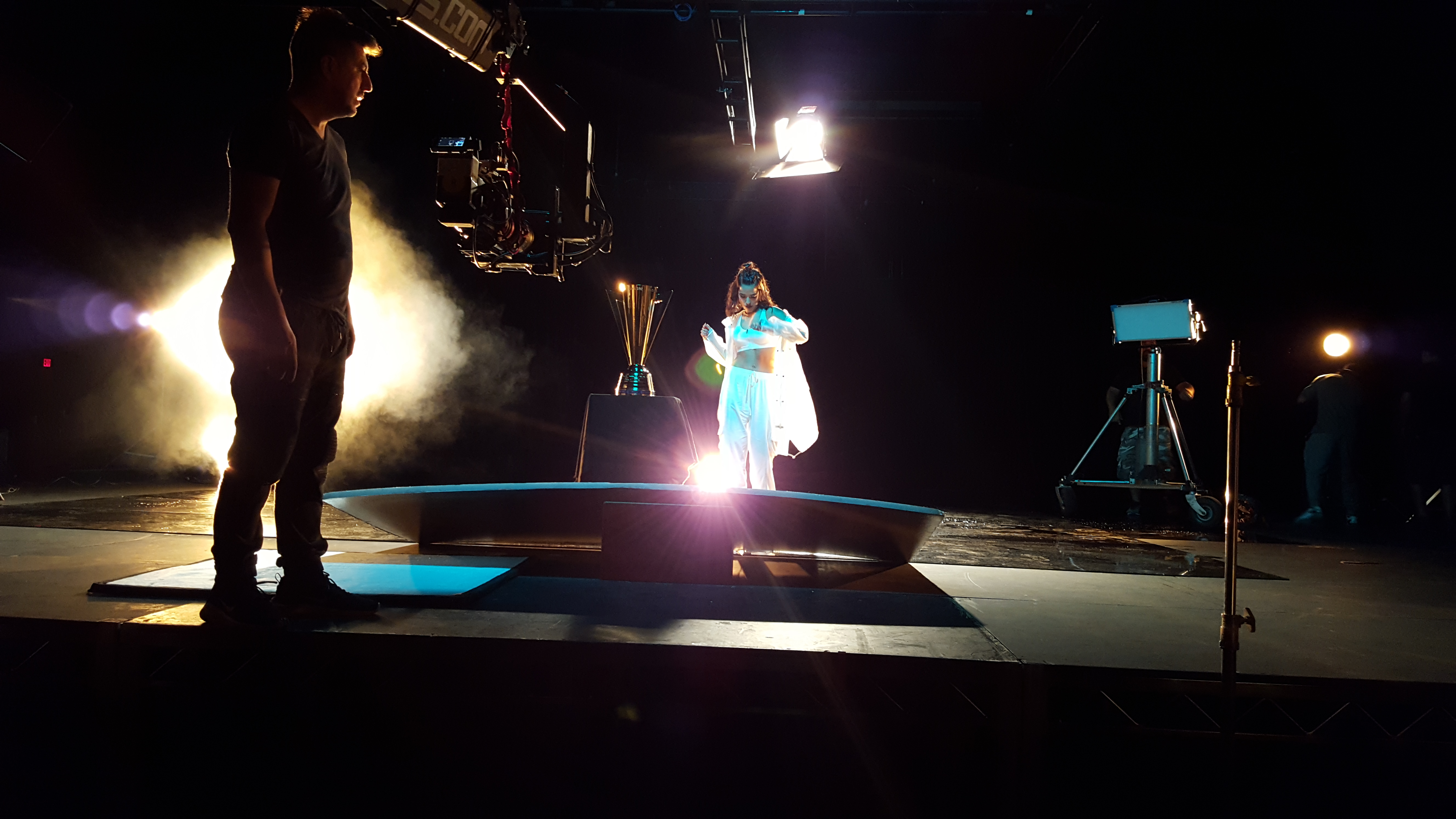
Gale at the recording of the "Levántate" music video

On June 25, 2017 Univision announced on its flagship show República Deportiva that it selected "Levántate", a dance song from the album, as the official song of the 2017 CONCACAF Gold Cup for the promotion and coverage of the soccer tournament. The song was written and produced by Gale and Juan Andres Ceballos and became the promotional single of the album during that time. Gale followed up with "Incontrolable", a dancehall infused track, later that year.

Gale's album promotion came to a halt when Hurricane Maria hit her homeland of Puerto Rico. After experiencing the devastation caused by the force of nature, Gale wrote a song for the people of Puerto Rico called "Aquí estamos" which she released on January 19, 2018.

“Como Cuando" is the latest single off of "Espirales Sin Sentido" released February 20, 2018.

In October 2026, she was announced as a participant of Benidorm Fest 2027.

== Discography ==
Albums
Year	Title	Credits
2017	Espirales sin sentido	Musician; Featured artist; Songwriter; Producer; Executive producer
2023	Lo Que No Te Dije	Musician; Featured artist; Songwriter
2025	Lo Que Puede Pasar	

Singles
Year	Title	Credits
2018	"Aquí Estamos"	Musician; Featured artist; Songwriter; Producer; Executive producer
2023	"Find Your Voice Miami Beach Episode 2: Lo Que Pasó Pasó / Nuestra Canción"	Musician; Featured artist; Songwriter
2024	"Inevitable (Shakira cover)"	Musician; Featured artist; Producer

Collaborations
Year	Title	Credits
2021	"XNilo & GALE - Fuiste Tú"	Musician; Featured artist; Songwriter
2024	"Ana Mena & Gale - La Razón"	Musician; Featured artist

== Musical, theatre and television credits ==
Plays
Year	Play	Role	Director	Company
2011	Spring Awakening	Wendla Bergman	Miguel Rosa	Black Box Theatre
2012	Broadway Bound	Anita (West Side Story); Millie (Thoroughly Modern Millie); Dancer (Chicago); Singer (Everyday Rapture)	Miguel Rosa	Black Box Theatre
2012	Rent	Mimi	Miguel Rosa	Black Box Theatre
2013	Dominique	Young Nun	Gil René	Acrópolis
2013	Viva Julia de Burgos	Young Julia	Gil René	Acrópolis
2014	Código Late	Melodía	Alex Cintrón	–
2014	Contratiempo	Laura	Miguel Rosa	Black Box Theatre

Television
Year	Program	Role
2017	Univision 2017 Gold Cup	Songwriter; Featured Artist
