= La Voz Kids (Spanish TV series) season 5 =

La Voz Kids
- Season 5
- Hosted by: Eva González; Juanra Bonet (backstage host)
- Coaches: David Bisbal; Rosario Flores; Vanesa Martín; Melendi
- Winner: Irene Gil
- Winning coach: David Bisbal
- Runner-up: Daniel García

Release
- Original network: Antena 3
- Original release: 16 September – 27 October 2019

Season chronology
- Next → Season 6

The fifth season of La Voz Kids premiered on September 16, 2019, and was the first edition of the format to be broadcast by Antena 3, after the acquisition of the rights that previously belonged to Telecinco. The program, based on the original Dutch format The Voice of Holland, was presented by Eva González. The panel of coaches for this edition consisted of veterans David Bisbal and Rosario Flores, accompanied by Melendi, in his second season, and newcomer Vanesa Martín. The winner of the season was Irene Gil, a member of David Bisbal's team, who was crowned champion in the grand finale broadcast on December 27, 2019. As a prize, she received a scholarship of 10,000 euros for musical training and the opportunity to record a single with Universal Music.

== Coaches and hosts ==
La Voz Kids Season 5 Coaches and Hosts

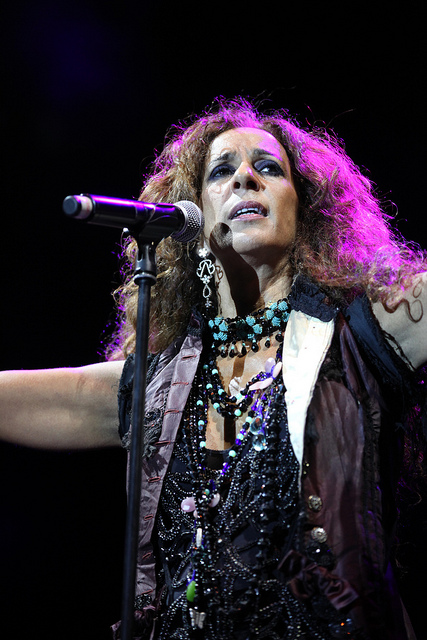
Rosario Flores

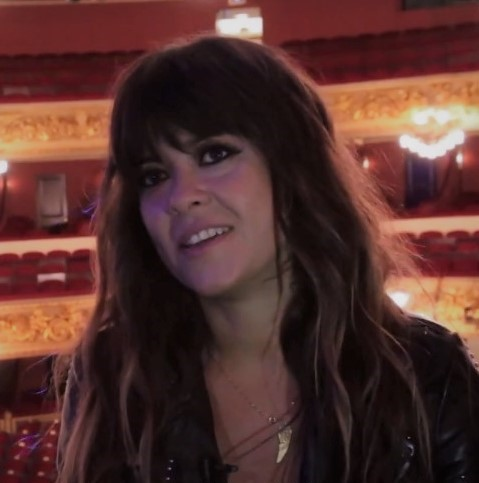
Vanesa Martín

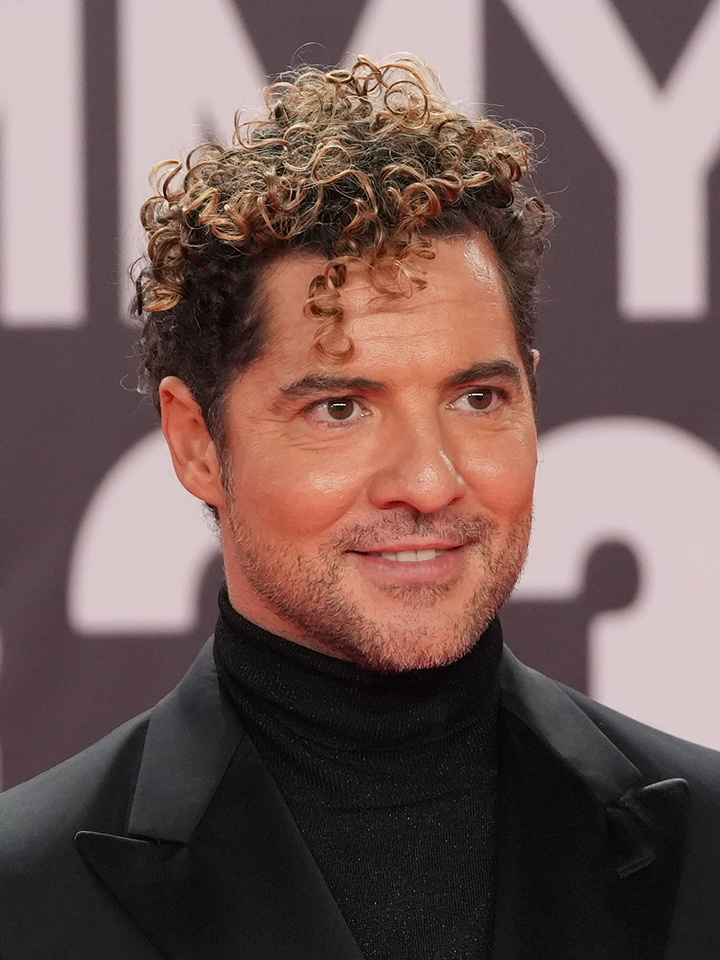
David Bisbal

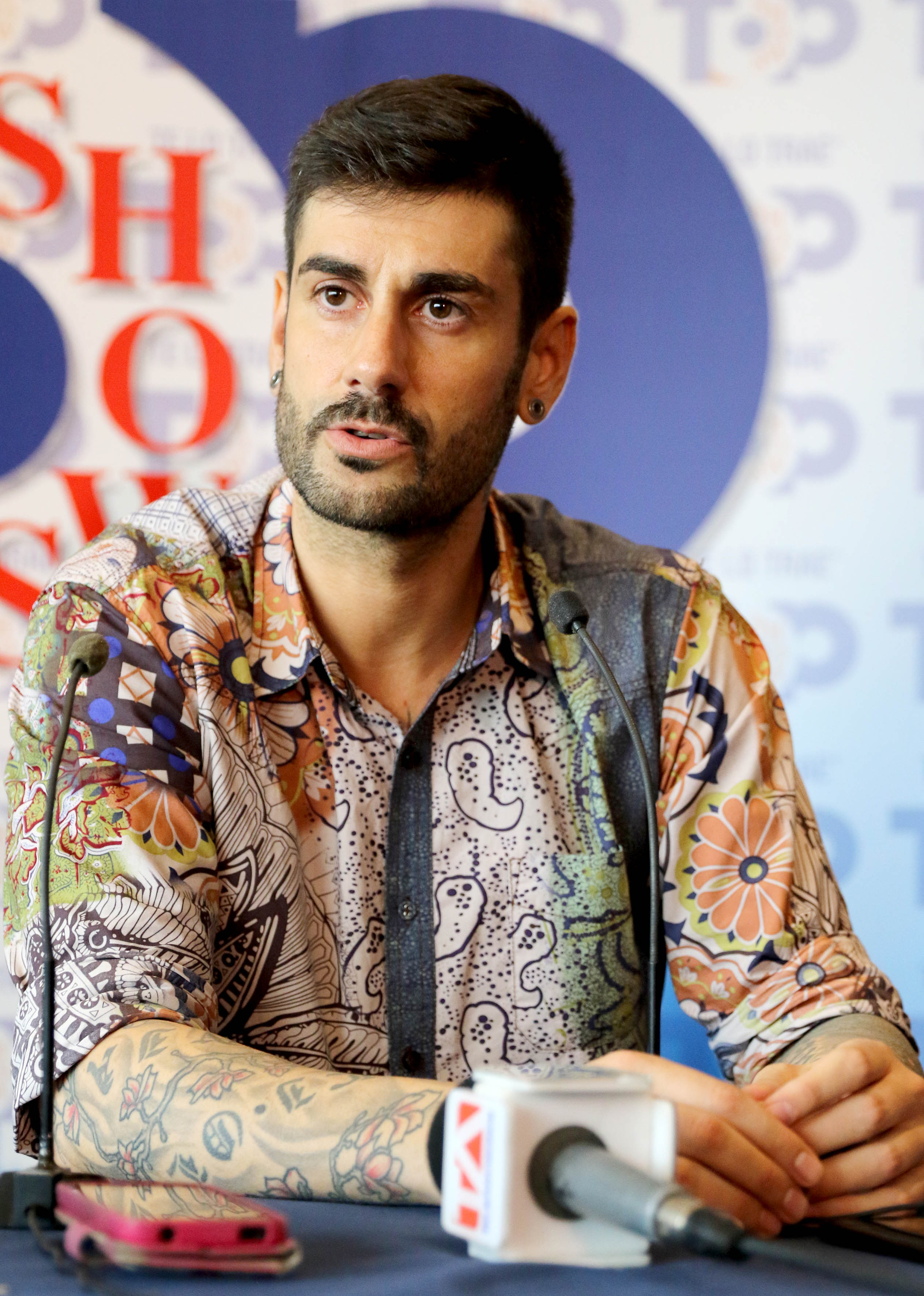
Melendi

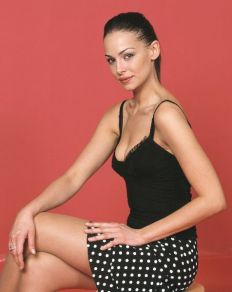
Eva González

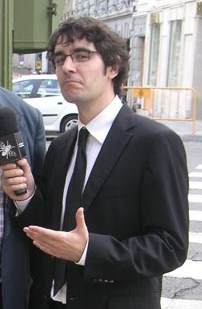
Juanra Bonet

In this edition, the panel of coaches was composed of four big names in Spanish music: David Bisbal and Rosario Flores, who returned from previous editions, Melendi, who participated for the second time, and Vanesa Martín, who made her debut in the format. The main presentation was in charge of Eva González, marking her first season at the helm of La Voz Kids after the change of broadcaster. Presenter Juanra Bonet acted as co-presenter, accompanying the families and candidates backstage during the auditions and elimination rounds.

== Teams ==
- Winner
- Runner-up
- Third place
- Fourth place
- Eliminated in the Finale
- Eliminated in the Semi-final
- Eliminated in the Knockouts
- Stolen in the Battles
- Eliminated in the Battles

Coaches	Top 60 Artists
David Bisbal	
Rosario Flores	
Vanesa Martín	
Melendi	
Note: Italicized names are stolen artists (names scratched through within former teams).

== Blind auditions ==
In this phase, the four coaches must form their teams with 15 candidates each. With their backs to the stage, the coaches evaluate the participants only by their voice; if they like what they hear, they press the "I want you" button, turning their chair around. If more than one coach turns around, the candidate chooses which team they want to join. If no one turns around by the end of the presentation, the participant is eliminated. A new feature this season was the retention of the "Block" button. Each coach had the right to block one of their colleagues twice during an audition, preventing the chosen candidate from opting for that specific team. The block is only valid if the coach who used it also turns their chair around.

Blind auditions color key
✔	Coach pressed "QUIERO TU VOZ" button
	Artist elected to join this coach's team
	Artist defaulted to this coach's team
	Artist eliminated with no coach pressing his or her "QUIERO TU VOZ" button
✘	Coach pressed "QUIERO TU VOZ" button, but was blocked by another coach from getting the artist
	Blocked by David; Blocked by Rosario; Blocked by Vanesa; Blocked by Melendi

=== Episode 1 (16 September) ===
Order	Artist	Age	Song	Coach's and contestant's choices			
Order	Artist	Age	Song	David	Rosario	Vanesa	Melendi
1	Daniel García	7	"El Patio"	✘	✔	✔	✔
2	Sofía Esteban	14	"Miss Celie's Blues"	✔	✔	✔	✔
3	Manuela Gómez	7	"Aún no te was ido"	✔	✔	✔	✔
4	Malu Salgado	13	"Russian Roulette"	—	—	—	—
5	Paloma Puelles	12	"Lucía"	✔	✔	✔	✔
6	Levi Díaz	10	"We've Only Just Begun"	—	—	—	—
7	Salvador Bermúdez	13	"Al alba"	✔	✘	✔	—

=== Episode 2 (17 September) ===
Order	Artist	Age	Song	Coach's and contestant's choices			
Order	Artist	Age	Song	David	Rosario	Vanesa	Melendi
1	Juan Manuel Segovia	10	"Pena, Penita, pena"	✔	✔	✔	✔
2	Alison Fernández	8	"Ahora tú"	—	—	—	—
3	Sara Gálvez	15	"Toda una vida"	—	✘	—	✔
4	Alan Brizuela	13	"Ya me enteré"	—	—	✔	✔
5	Berta Luna	14	"The Second Star to the Right"	✔	✔	✔	✔
6	Beatriz Martínez	13	"Friends Will Be Friends"	—	—	—	—
7	Laura Valle	15	"I Will Be"	✔	✔	✔	—

=== Episode 3 (23 September) ===
Order	Artist	Age	Song	Coach's and contestant's choices			
Order	Artist	Age	Song	David	Rosario	Vanesa	Melendi
1	Victoria Herraiz	13	"Don't Rain on My Parade"	✔	✔	✔	✔
2	Arian Jiménez	8	"Santa Lucía"	—	—	—	—
3	Aiert Alberdi	13	"Como hablar"	—	—	✔	—
4	Marta Berlín	12	"Ex's & Oh's"	—	—	—	✔
5	Hugo Sánchez	12	"Madre Mía de la espanza"	✔	✔	✔	—
6	Guillermo Rueda	14	"Your Song"	—	—	—	—
7	Lidia España	13	"Gloria a ti"	—	✔	✔	—

=== Episode 4 (24 September) ===
Order	Artist	Age	Song	Coach's and contestant's choices			
Order	Artist	Age	Song	David	Rosario	Vanesa	Melendi
1	Laura Bautista	12	"I Have Nothing"	—	✔	✔	✔
2	Chavito	13	"Cuando nadie me ve"	✘	✔	✔	✔
3	Esperanza Bonelo	15	"Pero me acuerdo de ti"	✔	✔	✔	—
4	Inés Navarro	10	"My Heart Will Go On"	—	—	—	—
5	Aysha Bengoetxea	15	"If I Ain't Got You"	—	—	✔	—
6	Toni Vallés	10	"Invisible"	—	—	—	—
7	María Fernández	10	"When I Was Your Man"	—	—	✔	✔

=== Episode 5 (30 September) ===
Order	Artist	Age	Song	Coach's and contestant's choices			
Order	Artist	Age	Song	David	Rosario	Vanesa	Melendi
1	Yolaini Viñas	7	"La Gata Bajo la Lluvia"	—	✔	✔	—
2	Laura Muñoz	14	"Bang Bang"	—	—	✔	✘
3	Juan Miguel Cortés	10	"Al amanecer"	✔	✔	✔	✔
4	Yara Díez	11	"Que hay más allá"	—	—	—	—
5	Marcos Balmori	15	"Lucha de gigantes"	—	—	—	✔
6	Abel Bernal	9	"A mis queridos reyes magos"	—	✔	✔	—
7	Lucía Maqueda	15	"Still Loving You"	—	—	—	—

=== Episode 6 (01 October) ===
Order	Artist	Age	Song	Coach's and contestant's choices			
Order	Artist	Age	Song	David	Rosario	Vanesa	Melendi
1	Nauzet Llanos	8	"La Bikina"	—	—	—	—
2	Natalia Barone	11	"Que no daría yo"	—	✔	—	✔
3	Isabel Marsal	14	"Borracha de amor"	—	✔	✔	—
4	Luis Giménez	12	"Treasure"	—	—	—	✔
5	Amira Akourrih	9	"Listen"	—	—	—	—
6	Ahlam Akourrih	15	"Uncover"	—	—	—	✔
7	Román Suárez	12	"Campanera"	—	—	—	—
8	Alba Aguilar	14	"The One and Only"	✔	—	✔	—

=== Episode 7 (07 October) ===
Order	Artist	Age	Song	Coach's and contestant's choices			
Order	Artist	Age	Song	David	Rosario	Vanesa	Melendi
1	Elena Aguallo	14	"Warrior"	—	✔	—	—
2	Fran López	11	"La Bikina"	—	—	—	—
3	Eva Paul	12	"Rise Like a Phoenix"	—	—	✔	—
4	María Calero	14	"SOS"	✔	✔	✔	✔
5	Adriana Tonda	15	"Never Enough"	✔	—	—	✔
6	Alexandra Rosillo	13	"Riptide"	—	—	—	—
7	Julio Gómez	15	"Redemption Song"	—	—	✔	✔

=== Episode 8 (08 October) ===
Order	Artist	Age	Song	Coach's and contestant's choices			
Order	Artist	Age	Song	David	Rosario	Vanesa	Melendi
1	María Expósito	14	"All I Ask"	✔	✔	✘	✔
2	Gisela Troyano	10	"La mala costumbre"	—	—	—	—
3	Miguel Martín	12	"Caresse sur l'ocean"	—	—	✔	✔
4	Ruslana Panchyshyna	13	"It's a Man's Man's Man's World"	—	✔	✔	—
5	Alicia Paramés	7	"A Million Dreams"	—	—	—	—
6	Enshar Ghateh	13	"Someone like You"	—	—	—	✔
7	Carmen Ferre	12	"Quédate"	—	—	✔	—
8	Daniel Rodríguez	11	"Valerie"	—	—	—	—

=== Episode 9 (14 October) ===
Order	Artist	Age	Song	Coach's and contestant's choices			
Order	Artist	Age	Song	David	Rosario	Vanesa	Melendi
1	Ana María Escudero	11	"Beautiful"	✔	✔	✔	✔
2	Paola Casas	15	"Si Tú Me Miras"	—	✔	—	—
3	Itziar Guillén	7	"Madrecita"	—	—	—	—
4	Lucía Souto	14	"Lay Me Down"	✔	—	—	—
5	Evelyn Condrow	13	"Almost Is Never Enough"	—	✔	✔	—
6	Pablo Monge	9	"Vámonos ya pa casa"	—	—	—	✔
7	Emanuel Pop	12	"Stay with Me"	—	—	—	—

=== Episode 10 (15 October) ===
Order	Artist	Age	Song	Coach's and contestant's choices			
Order	Artist	Age	Song	David	Rosario	Vanesa	Melendi
1	Patricia García	12	"Caí"	✔	✔	✔	✔
2	Pablo Castiñeira	10	"Sweet Child o' Mine"	—	—	—	✔
3	Lucie Labays	14	"Girls Just Want to Have Fun"	—	—	✔	✔
4	Daniela Sánchez	11	"Los gatos no ladran"	—	—	—	—
5	Saira Suárez	9	"Wrecking Ball"	—	✔	—	—
6	Olivia Fernández	13	"Everyday"	—	—	✔	✔
7	Marc Deyanov	14	"In My Blood"	—	—	—	—

=== Episode 11 (21 October) ===
Order	Artist	Age	Song	Coach's and contestant's choices			
Order	Artist	Age	Song	David	Rosario	Vanesa	Melendi
1	Giada Alessio	15	"Rise Up"	✔	✔	✔	✔
2	Irene Gil	12	"Mamma Knows Best"	✔	✔	✔	—
3	Lucía Álvarez	13	"Cry Me Out"	—	—	—	—
4	Molly Puigcercos	8	"Thank You for the Music"	—	—	—	—
5	Julia Gonçalves	14	"Something's Got a Hold on Me"	—	✔	—	✔
6	Bryan Muñoz	11	"La Incondicional"	—	—	—	Team Full
7	Marcos Díaz	13	"Stone Cold"	✘	✔	✔	Team Full
8	Claudia Saura	12	"Havana"	—	✔	Team Full	Team Full

=== Episode 12 (22 October) ===
Order	Artist	Age	Song	Coach's and contestant's choices			
Order	Artist	Age	Song	David	Rosario	Vanesa	Melendi
1	Maksym Pashnyk	11	"Funiculì, Funiculà"	✔	✔	Team Full	Team Full
2	Marta Pérez	13	"You Are the Reason"	—	✔	Team Full	Team Full
3	Alicia Pétina	11	"Memory"	✔	✔	Team Full	Team Full
4	Rocío Carrasco	8	"Válgame Dios"	—	—	Team Full	Team Full
5	Claudia Martínez	10	"This Is Me"	—	✔	Team Full	Team Full
6	Irene Barrera	14	"Va todo al ganador"	—	Team Full	Team Full	Team Full
7	Lucía Torres	14	"Warrior"	✔	Team Full	Team Full	Team Full
