= La Voz Kids (Spanish TV series) season 6 =

La Voz Kids
- Season 6
- Hosted by: Eva González; Juanra Bonet (backstage host)
- Coaches: David Bisbal; Rosario Flores; Vanesa Martín; Melendi
- Winner: Levi Díaz
- Winning coach: Melendi
- Runner-up: Nazaret Moreno

Release
- Original network: Antena 3
- Original release: 7 May – 23 July 2021

Season chronology
- ← Previous; Season 5 Next → Season 7

The sixth season of La Voz Kids premiered on 7 May 2021 on Antena 3. David Bisbal, Rosario Flores, Vanesa Martín and Melendi remained as the coaches of the show. Eva González and Juanra Bonet also returned for their second season as hosts.

Levi Díaz from Team Melendi was announced the winner, marking Melendi's second and last victory as a coach.

== Coaches and hosts ==
La Voz Kids Season 6 Coaches and Hosts

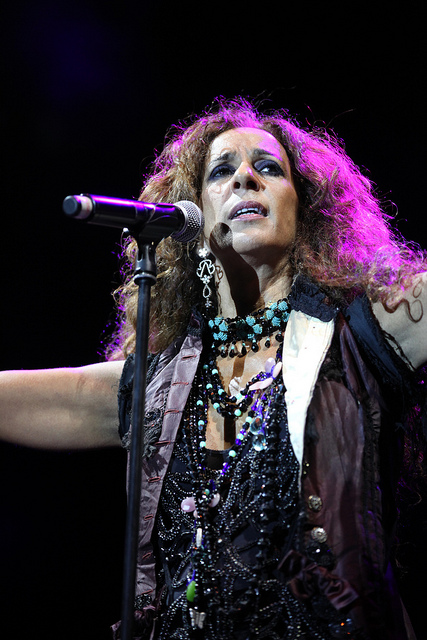
Rosario Flores

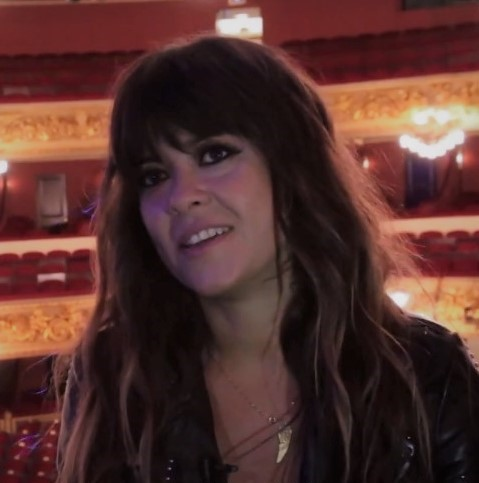
Vanesa Martín

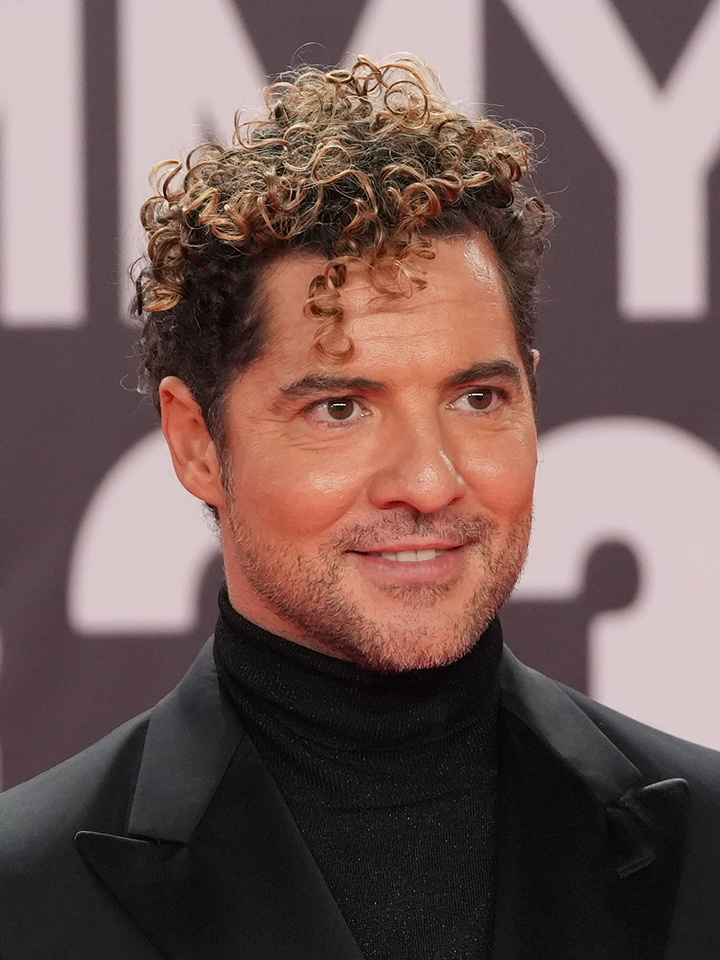
David Bisbal

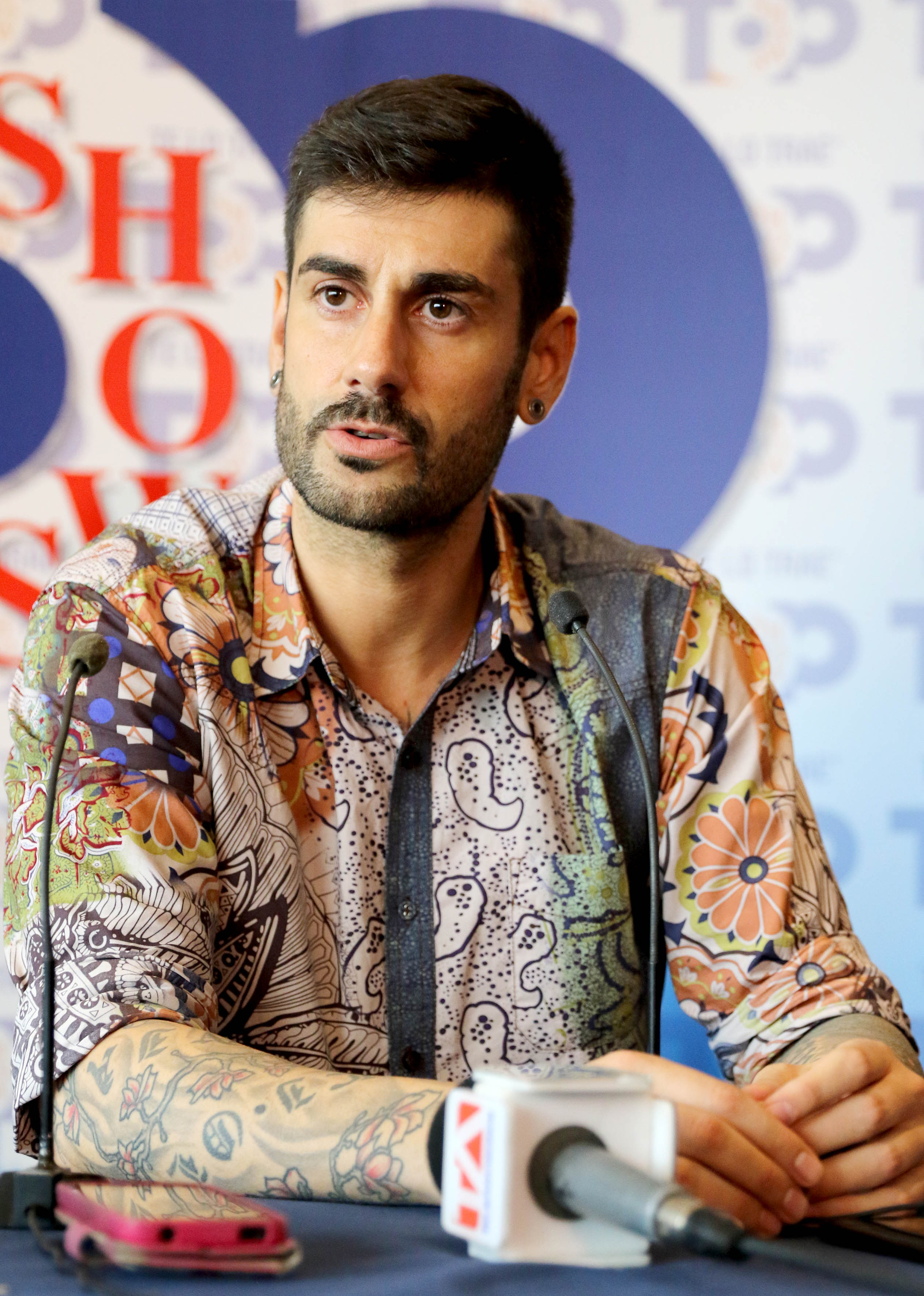
Melendi

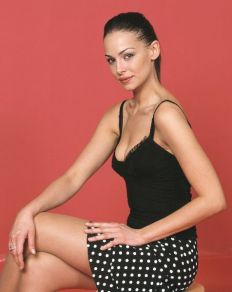
Eva González

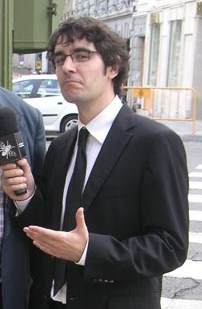
Juanra Bonet

In this season, Rosario Flores, Melendi, Vanesa Martin and David Bisbal are returning coaches from the previous season. However, Eva González remains the main host of the program together with Juanra Bonet who serves as backstage host,.

Also, the coaches' mentors changed in this season. Bisbal's team adviser would be Aitana, Beret for team Melendi, Blas Cantó for Team Vanesa, and Rozalén for team Rosario.

== Teams ==
- Winner
- Runner-up
- Third place
- Fourth place
- Eliminated in the Finale
- Eliminated in the Semi-final
- Eliminated in the Knockouts
- Stolen in the Battles
- Eliminated in the Battles

Coaches	Top 60 Artists					
David Bisbal						
David Bisbal	Rocío Avilés	Manuel Ayra	Lukas Urdea	Carmen Puente	Xoel Tarín	Georgia Izquierdo
David Bisbal	~~Dayron Jiménez~~	Elieser Bentacourt	María Frías	Marcos Moreno	Samuel Martín	Candela Morales
David Bisbal	Noa Hernández	Leonor López	Patricia Kirilova	Lucía Casani		
Rosario Flores						
Rosario Flores	Nazaret Moreno	Jesús Montero	Marta Fernández	Inés Thandi Perdersen	El Popo	Carlos Prieto
Rosario Flores	Blanca Valdés	Alina Mamikonyan	Erik Verdier	Inés Burgos	Juanmi Salguero	Rafael Velázquez
Rosario Flores	Samira Cuesta	Sofía Pérez	Alison Fernández	Santiago Padilla		
Vanesa Martín						
Vanesa Martín	Lola Avilés	Javier Crespo	Nora Fayos	Carla Quesada	Ferrán Amador	Cahaya Lovisa
Vanesa Martín	~~Xoel Tarín~~	~~Nazaret Moreno~~	Julia Pascual	Luna Clerc	Luna Maio	Jesús Civera
Vanesa Martín	Marina Luque	Carla Aucejo	Nuria Humaran	Samantha Fonseca		
Melendi						
Melendi	Levi Díaz	Jesús del Río	David Cabot	Dayron Jiménez	Alberto Negredo	Alejandro Gutiérrez
Melendi	~~Javier Crespo~~	Adrián Belmonte	María López	Rosario González	Haizea Roldán	Lisbel Francisco
Melendi	María Baró	Sonia Castellanos	Alejandro Marín	Lucas Mesa		
Note: Italicized names are stolen artists (names scratched through within former teams).

== Blind auditions ==
Blind auditions started on 7 May. Each coach is given two blocks to prevent another coach in getting the contestant to its team and; when the coach is blocked, the chair won't turn around. At the end of the blind auditions, Vanesa Martin didn't use her second block.

Blind auditions color key
✔	Coach pressed "QUIERO TU VOZ" button
	Artist elected to join this coach's team
	Artist defaulted to this coach's team
	Artist eliminated with no coach pressing his or her "QUIERO TU VOZ" button
✘	Coach pressed "QUIERO TU VOZ" button, but was blocked by another coach from getting the artist
	Blocked by David; Blocked by Rosario; Blocked by Vanesa; Blocked by Melendi

=== Episode 1 (7 May) ===
Order	Artist	Age	Song	Coach's and contestant's choices			
Order	Artist	Age	Song	David	Rosario	Vanesa	Melendi
1	Jesús del Río	7	"Highway to Hell"	✘	✔	✔	✔
2	Rocío Avilés	14	"No Te Pude Retener"	✔	—	✘	✔
3	Lola Avilés	12	"Mi Amante Amigo"	—	—	✔	✔
4	Carmen Asencio	11	"Valerie"	—	—	—	—
5	Carlos Prieto	9	"No Me Lo Cero"	✔	✔	✔	✔
6	Javier Crespo	15	"All I Want"	✔	✔	✔	✔
7	Irene & Alba Muñoz	10	"Que nadie"	—	—	—	—
8	Haizea Roldán	15	"Someone You Loved"	—	—	✔	✔
9	Samira Cuesta	7	"Válgame Dios"	✔	✔	✔	✔
10	Lucía Martín	10	"Lágrimas negras"	—	—	—	—
11	Ferrán Amador	12	"Creep"	—	—	✔	—
12	Lukas Urdea	10	"Mi Princesa"	✔	—	—	✔
13	Marina Olívan	10	"Uncover"	—	—	—	—
14	Julia Pascual	14	"She Used To Be Mine"	—	—	✔	✔
15	Ainara Manzano	12	"Colores en el viento"	—	—	—	—
16	Juanmi Salguero	13	"Turu Turai"	✔	✔	✔	✔

=== Episode 2 (14 May) ===
Order	Artist	Age	Song	Coach's and contestant's choices			
Order	Artist	Age	Song	David	Rosario	Vanesa	Melendi
1	Levi Díaz	11	"Warrior"	—	✔	—	✔
2	Nazaret Moreno	7	Señora	—	—	✔	—
3	Carmen Puente	13	"Love Is a Losing Game"	✔	✔	✔	✘
4	Marcos Ricbour	14	"Ex's & Oh's"	—	—	—	—
5	Leonor López	12	"Romance de Juan Osuna"	✔	✔	✘	✔
6	Sofía Pérez	7	"Mi persona favorita"	—	✔	—	—
7	Daniella Sánchez	8	"Sueña"	—	—	—	—
8	Manuel Ayra	14	"Si a veces hablo de ti"	✔	✔	✔	✔
9	Alejandro Marín	14	"When A Man Loves A Woman"	—	✔	✔	✔
10	José Carlos López	12	"Hoy tengo ganas de ti"	—	—	—	—
11	Rosario González	15	"idontwannabeyouanymore"	✘	✔	—	✔
12	Rafael Velázquez	12	"Que no daría yo"	—	✔	—	—
13	Violeta Marín	11	"Broadway Baby"	—	—	—	—
14	María Frías	11	"Castillo de Cristal"	✔	✔	✘	✔

=== Episode 3 (21 May) ===
Order	Artist	Age	Song	Coach's and contestant's choices			
Order	Artist	Age	Song	David	Rosario	Vanesa	Melendi
1	Alison Fernández	9	"Ya Te Olvide"	—	✔	—	—
2	Adrián Belmonte	13	"Jealous"	—	✔	—	✔
3	Candela San Juan	12	"Con la miel en los labios"	—	—	—	—
4	Nora Fayos	14	"idontwannabeyouanymore"	—	✔	✔	✔
5	Dayron Jiménez	13	"El pez más viejo del rio"	✔	✔	✔	✔
6	Ana Rodríguez	12	"Ex's & Oh's"	—	—	—	—
7	Jesús Civera	9	"Como Mirarte"	—	—	✔	—
8	Georgia Izquierdo	15	"Proud Mary"	✔	✔	✔	—
9	Marcos Moreno	15	"Tu Boca"	✔	✔	—	—
10	Inés Burgos	13	"Always Remember Us This Way"	✔	✔	✔	✔
11	Guillem García	12	"All of Me"	—	—	—	—
12	María López	14	"La Habitación"	✔	—	—	✔
13	César Albiach	11	"Can't Help Falling in Love"	—	—	—	—
14	Patricia Kirilova	12	"Lay Me Down"	✔	✔	✔	✔

=== Episode 4 (28 May) ===
Order	Artist	Age	Song	Coach's and contestant's choices			
Order	Artist	Age	Song	David	Rosario	Vanesa	Melendi
1	Alejandro Gutiérrez	14	"Fly Me to the Moon"	✔	✔	✔	✔
2	Samantha Fonseca	9	"Amor Eterno"	—	✔	✔	—
3	Carmen Ruiz	15	"You Are Not Alone"	—	—	—	—
4	Samuel Martín	13	"Corazon Hambriento"	✔	✔	—	—
5	David Cabot	13	"Wish You Were Here"	—	—	—	✔
6	Nayara de Jesús	10	"Hit the Road Jack"	—	—	—	—
7	El Popo	13	"Dicen Que Príncipes Y Reyes Tienes"	✔	✔	—	—
8	Carla Quesada	15	"Love on the Brain"	—	✔	✔	—
9	Alain Sánchez	11	"Aire"	—	—	—	—
10	Lucas Mesa	11	"7 Years"	—	—	—	✔
11	Erik Verdier	14	"And I Am Telling You I'm Not Going"	—	✔	—	—
12	Claudia Goikoechea	14	"Berlín"	—	—	—	—
13	Marina Luque	10	"Lovely"	—	—	✔	—
14	Noa Hernandez	15	"Con La Miel En Los Labios"	✔	✔	✔	✔

=== Episode 5 (4 June) ===
Order	Artist	Age	Song	Coach's and contestant's choices			
Order	Artist	Age	Song	David	Rosario	Vanesa	Melendi
1	Candela Morales	15	"Soñar Contigo"	✔	—	—	✔
2	Xoel Tarín	13	"I Got You"	—	—	✔	—
3	Sara Vidal	10	"Torre De Arena"	—	—	—	—
4	Inés Thandi	15	"Say My Name"	—	✔	—	—
5	María Baró	15	"Perfect"	—	✔	✔	✔
6	Águeda González	13	"Cai"	—	—	—	—
7	Carla Aucejo	11	"Con Las Ganas"	—	—	✔	—
8	Blanca Valdés	15	"Skinny Love"	—	✔	—	—
9	Pilar Sánchez	10	"Corazon Hambriento"	—	—	—	—
10	Sonia Castellanos	15	"La Vie en rose"	—	✔	✔	✔
11	Luna di Maio	11	"La Solitudine"	—	—	✔	—
12	Marcos del Río	12	"Let It Be"	—	—	—	—
13	Alina Mamikonyan	10	"Mañana"	—	✔	—	—
14	Nuria Humaran	15	"Nana Triste"	✔	—	✔	✔

=== Episode 6 (11 June) ===
Order	Artist	Age	Song	Coach's and contestant's choices			
Order	Artist	Age	Song	David	Rosario	Vanesa	Melendi
1	Marta Fernández	11	"When I Was Your Man"	—	✔	—	—
2	Daniela Petit	11	"La gata bajo la Lluvia"	—	—	—	—
3	Luna Clerc	11	"New York State of Mind"	—	—	✔	—
4	Luna Reina	14	"Bound To You"	—	—	—	—
5	Alberto Negredo	14	"El sitio de mi recreo"	—	—	—	✔
6	Alba Pascual	15	"Shallow"	—	—	—	—
7	Cahaya Lovisa	7	"Heal the World"	✔	✔	✔	✔
8	Elieser Betancort	12	"Mi Princesa"	✔	✔	Team Full	—
9	Candela Camacho	12	"Defying Gravity"	—	—	Team Full	—
10	Jesús Montero	9	"Me cuesta tanto olvidarte"	✘	✔	Team Full	✔
11	Cayetana Rollán	10	"A Million Dreams"	—	—	Team Full	—
12	Lisbel Francisco	13	"Almost Is Never Enough"	✔	✔	Team Full	✔
13	Santiago Padilla	13	"Suo Gan"	—	✔	Team Full	Team Full
14	Lucía Casani	13	"Ya me enteré"	✔	Team Full	Team Full	Team Full

== Battles ==
The battles round started on 18 June. The coaches can steal one losing artist from other coaches. In addition, coaches' advisors help them on deciding who will be advancing to the next round; Aitana for Team David Bisbal, Rozalén for Team Rosario, Blas Cantó for Team Vanesa and Beret for Team Melendi. Contestants who won their battle or were stolen by another coach advanced to the Knockouts.

Battles color key
Artist was chosen by his/her coach to advance to the Knockouts
Artist was stolen by another coach and advanced to the Knockouts
Artist was eliminated

Episode	Coach	Order	Winner	Song	Losers	'Steal' result			
Episode	Coach	Order	Winner	Song	Losers	David	Rosario	Vanesa	Melendi
Episode 7 (18 June)	Melendi	1	Jesús del Río	"Locked Out of Heaven"	Alejandro Marín	—	—	—	—N/a
Episode 7 (18 June)	Melendi	1	Jesús del Río	"Locked Out of Heaven"	Lucas Mesa	—	—	—	—N/a
Episode 7 (18 June)	David Bisbal	2	Rocío Avíles (14)	"Ángel Caído"	Leonor López (12)	—N/a	—	—	—
Episode 7 (18 June)	David Bisbal	2	Rocío Avíles (14)	"Ángel Caído"	Dayron Jiménez (13)	—N/a	—	—	✔
Episode 7 (18 June)	Vanesa Martín	3	Lola Avilés	"Arráncame"	Samantha Fonseca	—	—	—N/a	Team full
Episode 7 (18 June)	Vanesa Martín	3	Lola Avilés	"Arráncame"	Nazaret Moreno	—	✔	—N/a	Team full
Episode 7 (18 June)	Rosario Flores	4	Jesús Montero (9)	"A Puro Dolor"	Santiago Padilla (13)	—	Team full	—	Team full
Episode 7 (18 June)	Rosario Flores	4	Jesús Montero (9)	"A Puro Dolor"	Alison Fernández (9)	—	Team full	—	Team full
Episode 7 (18 June)	David Bisbal	5	Georgia Izquierdo (15)	"Can't Stop the Feeling!"	Lucía Casani (13)	—N/a	Team full	—	Team full
Episode 7 (18 June)	David Bisbal	5	Georgia Izquierdo (15)	"Can't Stop the Feeling!"	Patricia Kirilova (12)	—N/a	Team full	—	Team full
Episode 7 (18 June)	Melendi	6	Alejandro Gutiérrez	"Somethin' Stupid"	María Baró	—	Team full	—	Team full
Episode 7 (18 June)	Melendi	6	Alejandro Gutiérrez	"Somethin' Stupid"	Sonia Castellanos	—	Team full	—	Team full
Episode 8 (25 June)	Rosario Flores	1	Carlos Prieto (9)	"Hoy"	Samira Cuesta (7)	—	Team full	—	Team full
Episode 8 (25 June)	Rosario Flores	1	Carlos Prieto (9)	"Hoy"	Sofía Pérez (7)	—	Team full	—	Team full
Episode 8 (25 June)	David Bisbal	2	Carmen Puente (13)	"New Rules"	Candela Morales (15)	—N/a	Team full	—	Team full
Episode 8 (25 June)	David Bisbal	2	Carmen Puente (13)	"New Rules"	Noa Hernández (15)	—N/a	Team full	—	Team full
Episode 8 (25 June)	Melendi	3	Levi Díaz	"Diamonds"	Lisbel Francisco	—	Team full	—	Team full
Episode 8 (25 June)	Melendi	3	Levi Díaz	"Diamonds"	Haizea Roldán	—	Team full	—	Team full
Episode 8 (25 June)	Vanesa Martín	4	Carla Quesada	"Un Año"	Nuria Humaran	—	Team full	—N/a	Team full
Episode 8 (25 June)	Vanesa Martín	4	Carla Quesada	"Un Año"	Carla Aucejo	—	Team full	—N/a	Team full
Episode 8 (25 June)	Rosario Flores	5	El Popo (13)	"Ya no quiero tu querer"	Juanmi Salguero	—	Team full	—	Team full
Episode 8 (25 June)	Rosario Flores	5	El Popo (13)	"Ya no quiero tu querer"	Rafael Velázquez	—	Team full	—	Team full
Episode 8 (25 June)	Vanesa Martín	6	Ferrán Amador	"Like I'm Gonna Lose You"	Xoel Tarín	✔	Team full	—N/a	Team full
Episode 8 (25 June)	Vanesa Martín	6	Ferrán Amador	"Like I'm Gonna Lose You"	Marina Luque	—	Team full	—N/a	Team full
Episode 8 (25 June)	Melendi	7	Alberto Negredo	"Saturno"	María López	Team full	Team full	—	Team full
Episode 8 (25 June)	Melendi	7	Alberto Negredo	"Saturno"	Rosario González	Team full	Team full	—	Team full
Episode 9 (2 July)	Vanesa Martín	1	Cahaya Lovisa	"Amor, amor de mis amores"	Luna di Mayo	Team full	Team full	—N/a	Team full
Episode 9 (2 July)	Vanesa Martín	1	Cahaya Lovisa	"Amor, amor de mis amores"	Jesús Civera	Team full	Team full	—N/a	Team full
Episode 9 (2 July)	David Bisbal	2	Manuel Ayra (14)	"Desencuentro"	Marcos Moreno (15)	Team full	Team full	—	Team full
Episode 9 (2 July)	David Bisbal	2	Manuel Ayra (14)	"Desencuentro"	Samuel Martín (13)	Team full	Team full	—	Team full
Episode 9 (2 July)	Rosario Flores	3	Inés Thandi Perdersen (15)	"Someone Like You"	Alina Mamikonyan	Team full	Team full	—	Team full
Episode 9 (2 July)	Rosario Flores	3	Inés Thandi Perdersen (15)	"Someone Like You"	Blanca Valdés	Team full	Team full	—	Team full
Episode 9 (2 July)	Melendi	4	David Cabot	"Give Me Love"	Adrián Belmonte	Team full	Team full	—	Team full
Episode 9 (2 July)	Melendi	4	David Cabot	"Give Me Love"	Javier Crespo	Team full	Team full	✔	Team full
Episode 9 (2 July)	Vanesa Martín	5	Nora Fayos	"Just Give Me a Reason"	Luna Clerc	Team full	Team full	Team full	Team full
Episode 9 (2 July)	Vanesa Martín	5	Nora Fayos	"Just Give Me a Reason"	Julia Pascual	Team full	Team full	Team full	Team full
Episode 9 (2 July)	David Bisbal	6	Lukas Urdea (10)	"Recuérdame"	Elieser Betancort (13)	Team full	Team full	Team full	Team full
Episode 9 (2 July)	David Bisbal	6	Lukas Urdea (10)	"Recuérdame"	María Frías (11)	Team full	Team full	Team full	Team full
Episode 9 (2 July)	Rosario Flores	7	Marta Fernández (11)	"We Are the Champions"	Inés Burgos	Team full	Team full	Team full	Team full
Episode 9 (2 July)	Rosario Flores	7	Marta Fernández (11)	"We Are the Champions"	Erik Verdier	Team full	Team full	Team full	Team full

== Knockouts ==
The knockouts round aired on 9 July. Known as "El Ultimo Asalto" in Spanish, in this round each teams' six participants perform, and the coaches select only four to advance for the semi-final. The advisors from the battles continued to help the coaches in their choices. In this round, Rosario Flores and Melendi switched chairs, with Beret temporarily sitting on Melendi's chair giving comments.

Knockouts color key
Artist was chosen by his/her coach to advance to the Semifinal
Artist was eliminated

Episode	Coach	Order	Artist	Song	Result
Episode 10 (9 July)	Melendi	1	Levi Díaz	"Warrior	Advanced
Episode 10 (9 July)	Melendi	2	Jesús del Río	"Highway to Hell"	Advanced
Episode 10 (9 July)	Melendi	3	Dayron Jiménez	"El pez más viejo del rio"	Advanced
Episode 10 (9 July)	Melendi	4	Alejandro Gutiérrez	"Fly Me to the Moon"	Eliminated
Episode 10 (9 July)	Melendi	5	Alberto Negredo	"El sitio de mi recreo"	Eliminated
Episode 10 (9 July)	Melendi	6	David Cabot	"Wish You Were Here"	Advanced
Episode 10 (9 July)	Rosario Flores	7	Carlos Prieto	"No me lo creo"	Eliminated
Episode 10 (9 July)	Rosario Flores	8	Marta Fernández	"When I Was Your Man"	Advanced
Episode 10 (9 July)	Rosario Flores	9	Jesús Montero	"Me cuesta tanto olvidarte"	Advanced
Episode 10 (9 July)	Rosario Flores	10	El Popo	"Dicen Que Príncipes Y Reyes Tienes"	Eliminated
Episode 10 (9 July)	Rosario Flores	11	Inés Thandi Pedersen	"Say My Name"	Advanced
Episode 10 (9 July)	Rosario Flores	12	Nazaret Moreno	"Señora"	Advanced
Episode 10 (9 July)	David Bisbal	13	Carmen Puente	"Love Is a Losing Game"	Advanced
Episode 10 (9 July)	David Bisbal	14	Xoel Tarín	"I Got You (I Feel Good)"	Eliminated
Episode 10 (9 July)	David Bisbal	15	Rocío Avilés	"No Te Pude Retener"	Advanced
Episode 10 (9 July)	David Bisbal	16	Lukas Urdea	"Mi Princesa"	Advanced
Episode 10 (9 July)	David Bisbal	17	Manuel Ayra	"Si a veces hablo de ti"	Advanced
Episode 10 (9 July)	David Bisbal	18	Georgina Izquierdo	"Proud Mary"	Eliminated
Episode 10 (9 July)	Vanesa Martín	19	Lola Avilés	"Mi Amante Amigo"	Advanced
Episode 10 (9 July)	Vanesa Martín	20	Cahaya Lovisa	"Heal the World"	Eliminated
Episode 10 (9 July)	Vanesa Martín	21	Nora Fayos	"idontwannabeyouanymore"	Advanced
Episode 10 (9 July)	Vanesa Martín	22	Carla Quesada	"Love on the Brain"	Advanced
Episode 10 (9 July)	Vanesa Martín	23	Javier Crespo	"All I Want"	Advanced
Episode 10 (9 July)	Vanesa Martín	24	Ferrán Amador	"Creep"	Eliminated

== Final phase ==
=== Week 1: Semi-final (16 July) ===
Semi-final color key
Artist was chosen by his/her coach to advance to the Finale
Artist was eliminated

Order	Coach	Artist	Song	Result
1	David Bisbal	Manuel Ayra	"Tu Refugio"	David's choice
2	David Bisbal	Carmen Puente	"I'll Never Love Again"	Eliminated
3	David Bisbal	Lukas Urdea	"Mi Buen Amor"	Eliminated
4	David Bisbal	Rocío Avilés	"Vuelvo a verte"	David's choice
5	Vanesa Martín	Lola Avilés	"Te espero aquí"	Vanesa's choice
6	Vanesa Martín	Carla Quesada	"All I Ask"	Eliminated
7	Vanesa Martín	Nora Fayos	"Something Just Like This"	Eliminated
8	Vanesa Martín	Javier Crespo	"When We Were Young"	Vanesa's choice
9	Melendi	Jesús Del Río	"Back in Black"	Melendi's choice
10	Melendi	Dayron Jiménez	"Como el agua"	Eliminated
11	Melendi	David Cabot	"With or Without You"	Eliminated
12	Melendi	Levi Díaz	"Alive"	Melendi's choice
13	Rosario Flores	Nazaret Moreno	"Olvidé respirar"	Rosario's choice
14	Rosario Flores	Marta Fernández	"The Way We Were"	Eliminated
15	Rosario Flores	Inés Thandi Pedersen	"Make You Feel My Love"	Eliminated
16	Rosario Flores	Jesús Montero	"No Me Doy por Vencido"	Rosario's choice

=== Week 2: Finale (23 July) ===
==== Round one ====
Finale color key
Artist was chosen by his/her coach to advance to round two
Artist was eliminated

Order	Coach	Artist	Song	Duet with team advisor	Result
1	Melendi	Jesús del Río	"The Final Countdown"	"Ojalá" (with Beret)	Eliminated
2	Melendi	Levi Díaz	"Never Enough"	"Ojalá" (with Beret)	Melendi's choice
3	David Bisbal	Manuel Ayra	"Te Extraño"	"Más de lo que aposté" (with Aitana)	Eliminated
4	David Bisbal	Rocío Avilés	"Y, ¿Si Fuera Ella?"	"Más de lo que aposté" (with Aitana)	David's choice
5	Vanesa Martín	Lola Avilés	"Lucía"	"Complicado" (with Blas Cantó)	Vanesa's choice
6	Vanesa Martín	Javier Crespo	"Angels"	"Complicado" (with Blas Cantó)	Eliminated
7	Rosario Flores	Jesús Montero	"Dígale"	"Este Tren" (with Rozalén)	Eliminated
8	Rosario Flores	Nazaret Moreno	"90 minutos"	"Este Tren" (with Rozalén)	Rosario's choice

==== Round two ====
After this round, the public was decided the winner of medium elections. The Major decides Levi like the winner.

Order	Coach	Artist	Duet with coach	Result
1	David Bisbal	Rocío Avilés	"Abriré La Puerta"	Fourth place
2	Rosario Flores	Nazaret Moreno	"Tienes Que Vivir"	Runner-up
3	Vanesa Martín	Lola Avilés	"Ya"	Third place
4	Melendi	Levi Díaz	"Mama No" (with Pablo López) (Note: Melendi was unable to be present in-person on the episode, so López replaced him to sing with Díaz.)	Winner

== Elimination chart ==
=== Color key ===
Artist's info

- Team David
- Team Rosario
- Team Vanesa
- Team Melendi

Result details

- Winner
- Runner-up
- Third place
- Fourth place
- Saved by her/his coach
- Eliminated

=== Overall ===
Final Phase results
Artists	Semi-final	Finale	
Artists	Semi-final	Round 1	Round 2
Levi Díaz	Safe	Safe	Winner
Nazaret Moreno	Safe	Safe	Runner-up
Lola Avilés	Safe	Safe	Third place
Rocío Avilés	Safe	Safe	Fourth place
Javier Crespo	Safe	Eliminated	Eliminated (Finale)
Jesús Montero	Safe	Eliminated	Eliminated (Finale)
Jesús del Río	Safe	Eliminated	Eliminated (Finale)
Manuel Ayra	Safe	Eliminated	Eliminated (Finale)
Carla Quesada	Eliminated	Eliminated (Semi-final)	
Carmen Puente	Eliminated	Eliminated (Semi-final)	
David Cabot	Eliminated	Eliminated (Semi-final)	
Dayron Jiménez	Eliminated	Eliminated (Semi-final)	
Inés Thandi Perdersen	Eliminated	Eliminated (Semi-final)	
Lukas Urdea	Eliminated	Eliminated (Semi-final)	
Marta Fernández	Eliminated	Eliminated (Semi-final)	
Nora Fayos	Eliminated	Eliminated (Semi-final)	

=== Teams ===
Galas results per team
Artists	Semi-final	Finale	
Artists	Semi-final	Round 1	Round 2
Rocío Avilés	Coach's choice	Coach's choice	Fourth place
Manuel Ayra	Coach's choice	Eliminated	
Carmen Puente	Eliminated		
Lukas Urdea	Eliminated		
Nazaret Moreno	Coach's choice	Coach's choice	Runner-up
Jesús Montero	Coach's choice	Eliminated	
Inés Thandi Perdersen	Eliminated		
Marta Fernández	Eliminated		
Lola Avilés	Coach's choice	Coach's choice	Third place
Javier Crespo	Coach's choice	Eliminated	
Carla Quesada	Eliminated		
Nora Fayos	Eliminated		
Levi Díaz	Coach's choice	Coach's choice	Winner
Jesús del Río	Coach's choice	Eliminated	
David Cabot	Eliminated		
Dayron Jiménez	Eliminated		
