= La Voz Kids (Spanish TV series) =

Spanish reality TV series

- Genre: Reality television
- Created by: John de Mol Jr.; Roel van Velzen
- Presented by: Eva González; Juanra Bonet; Jesús Vázquez; Tania Llasera; El Monaguillo
- Judges: David Bisbal; Rosario Flores; Malú; Manuel Carrasco; Antonio Orozco; Melendi; Vanesa Martín; Aitana; Sebastián Yatra; Pablo López; Lola Índigo; Edurne; Manuel Turizo; Luis Fonsi; Ana Mena
- Country of origin: Spain
- Original language: Spanish
- No. of seasons: 11
- No. of episodes: 117

Production
- Production locations: Community of Madrid, Spain
- Running time: 90-150 minutes
- Production companies: Talpa (2014–2018); Boomerang TV; Atresmedia (2019–); ITV Studios (2021–)

Original release
- Network: Telecinco (2014–2018); Antena 3 (2019–present)
- Release: 6 February 2014 – present

Related
- La Voz; La Voz Senior; La Voz All Stars; The Voice of Holland; The Voice (American TV series)

La Voz Kids (Spanish for The Voice Kids) is a Spanish reality talent show broadcast on Antena 3. It premiered on 6 February 2014 on Telecinco and is part of the international syndication The Voice based on the original Dutch television program The Voice of Holland, created by Dutch television producer John de Mol Jr..

The panel of coaches for the first season of La Voz Kids was David Bisbal, Rosario Flores, and Malú. The panel for the upcoming twelfth season will feature Antonio Orozco, Edurne, Manuel Turizo, and Ana Mena. Other coaches from previous seasons include Manuel Carrasco, Melendi, Vanesa Martín, Pablo López, Aitana, Sebastián Yatra, Lola Índigo, and Luis Fonsi.

Participation is only for contestants aged 7 to 15.

== Format ==
First Phase: The Blind Auditions. In this phase, the three coaches will have their backs to the participants and will be guided solely by their voice. There are 93 young people, however, only 45 will get on stage. If the contestant's voice wins over a member of the jury, he will press a button that will turn his chair to see the participant. In this way, you will demonstrate that you want this contestant to be part of your team. If more than one coach presses the button, the participant will have the option to decide which of the three wants to be trained in this competition; but if a single trainer presses the button, the contestant goes to his team automatically. In case no one of the jury presses the button, it means that the participant has not been selected.

Second Phase: The Battles. In this stage, the coaches will be forced to reduce their equipment to a third. They must face three of their members who must sing in a "ring". Those who confront each other must demonstrate who has the best voice. In the end, each coach will make the decision to eliminate two of them, who will have to leave the competition. So that the coaches can make a decision, they are advised by other singers. Then they will choose two and the other three will sing the song they sang in the blind auditions, so that they choose one of those three and will join the other two for the live ones. In season 5, the steal from the adults' version of the show was implemented. Each coach has the opportunity to steal one young artist from other teams. In season 7, steals were raised to two per coach.

Third Phase: The Last Assault (Sing Off). Each contestant must defend their subject of blind auditions before the members of the jury and their advisors. Of each team will be only two contestants who will go to the grand final.

Fourth and final Phase: The Grand Final. This last phase of the program includes two parts: The semifinal and the final. The finalists will sing songs individually, as well as with their respective coaches, in addition to performances with guest artists. After the first elimination, only 3 contestants will fight to be finally: La Voz Kids (Spain).

== Coaches and hosts ==
The first season of the kids version had David Bisbal, Rosario Flores and Malú as coaches, all whom were part of the adult version's first season. The second and third season saw the return of both Bisbal and Flores, joined by Manuel Carrasco replacing Malú in season two, with Antonio Orozco replacing Carrasco in season three. The fourth season was the last produced for Telecinco which had Flores, Orozco and debutant Melendi as coaches, meanwhile Bisbal was 'supercoach' of the season.

On 16 September 2019, the fifth season premiered on Antena 3, with veteran coaches Bisbal and Flores, Melendi on his second season and debutant Vanesa Martín. For the sixth season, all four coaches returned as part of the panel. For season seven, Bisbal was left as the only coach returning along debutant Aitana, Sebastián Yatra and Pablo López. It was later announced that Flores would return to the panel after a one-season hiatus, joining Bisbal, Aitana and Yatra in season eight. Bisbal, Flores and Melendi were then joined in season nine by Lola Índigo. The tenth season features returning coaches Bisbal and Índigo, alongside debuting coaches Edurne and Manuel Turizo. The eleventh season premiered in 2026 with returning coach Edurne, former coach Orozco, former La Voz coach Luis Fonsi, and Ana Mena. The twelfth season will premiere in 2027 with Edurne, Orozco, and Mena returning from the eleventh season, alongside Turizo who will return after a one-season hiatus.

Seasons
Coach	1	2	3	4	5	6	7	8	9	10	11	12
David Bisbal				S.C.								
Rosario Flores												
Malú												
Manuel Carrasco												
Antonio Orozco												
Melendi												
Vanesa Martín												
Aitana												
Sebastián Yatra												
Pablo López												
Lola Índigo												
Edurne												
Manuel Turizo												
Luis Fonsi												
Ana Mena												

=== Line-up of coaches ===
Coaches' line-up by chairs order
Season	Year	Coaches			
Season	Year	1	2	3	4
1	2014	David	Rosario	Malú	—
2	2015	David	Rosario	Manuel	—
3	2017	David	Rosario	Antonio	—
4	2018	Melendi	Rosario	Antonio	—
5	2019	David	Rosario	Vanesa	Melendi
6	2021	David	Rosario	Vanesa	Melendi
7	2022	David	Aitana	Yatra	Pablo
8	2023	David	Rosario	Aitana	Yatra
9	2024	David	Lola	Rosario	Melendi
10	2025	David	Edurne	Lola	Turizo
11	2026	Fonsi	Edurne	Ana	Antonio
12	2027	Turizo	Edurne	Ana	Antonio

Current coaches

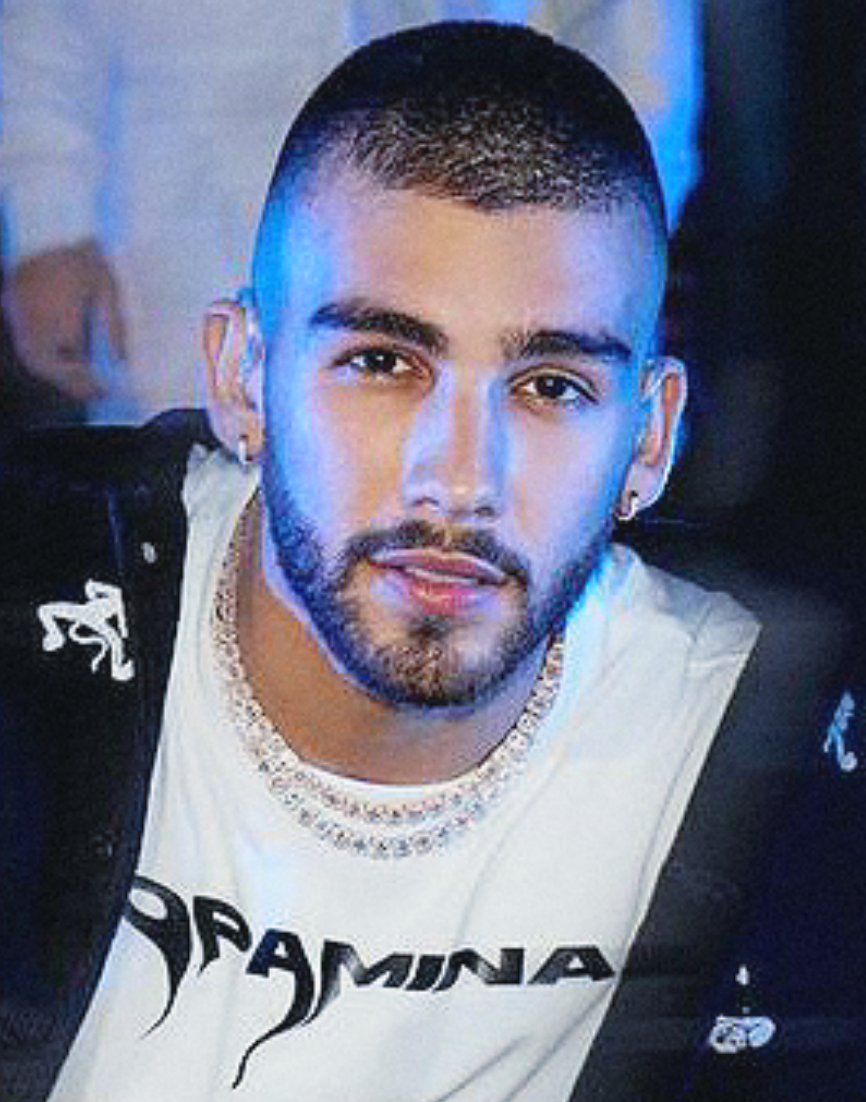
Manuel Turizo (10, upcoming in 12)

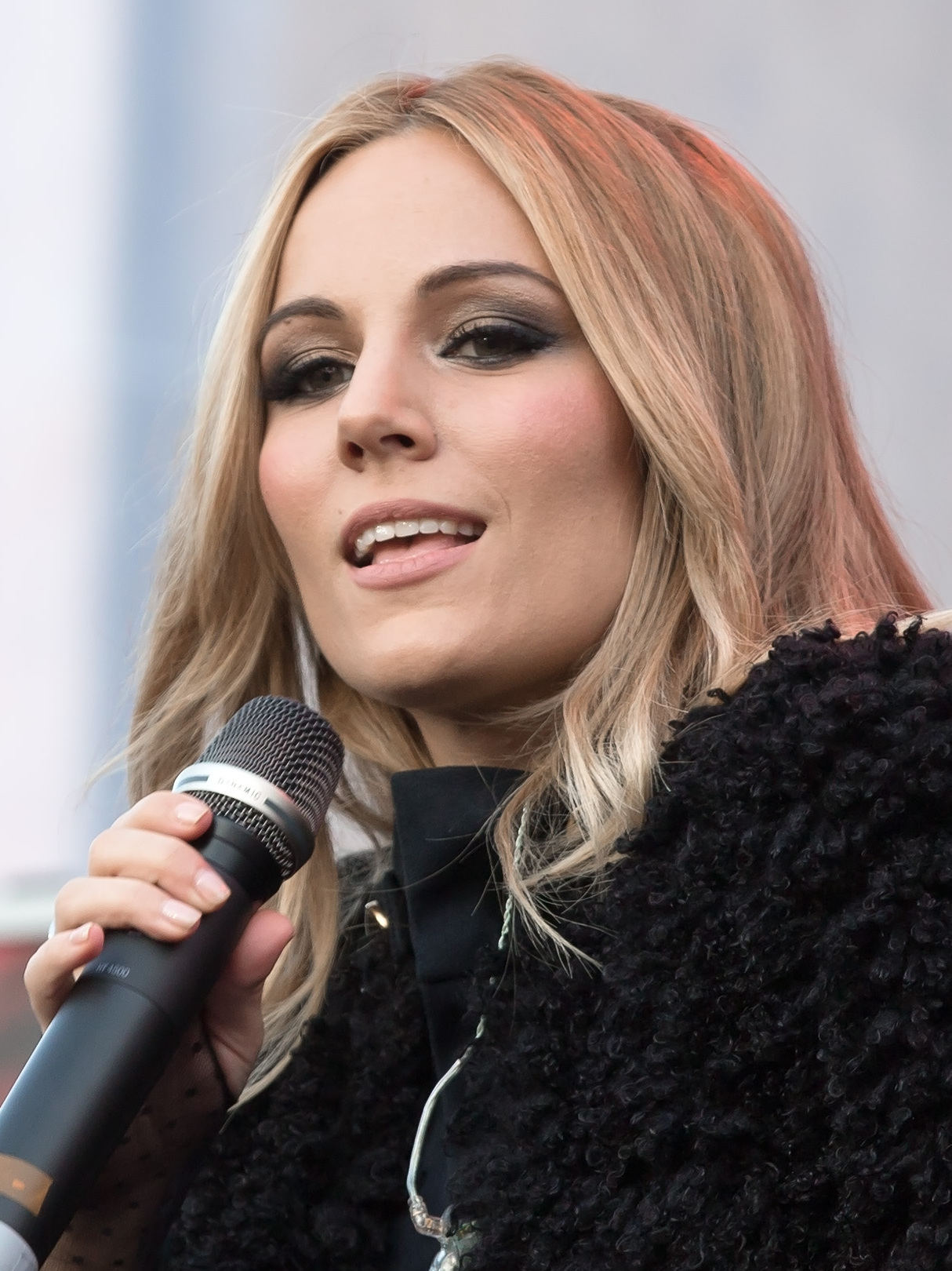
Edurne (10–present)

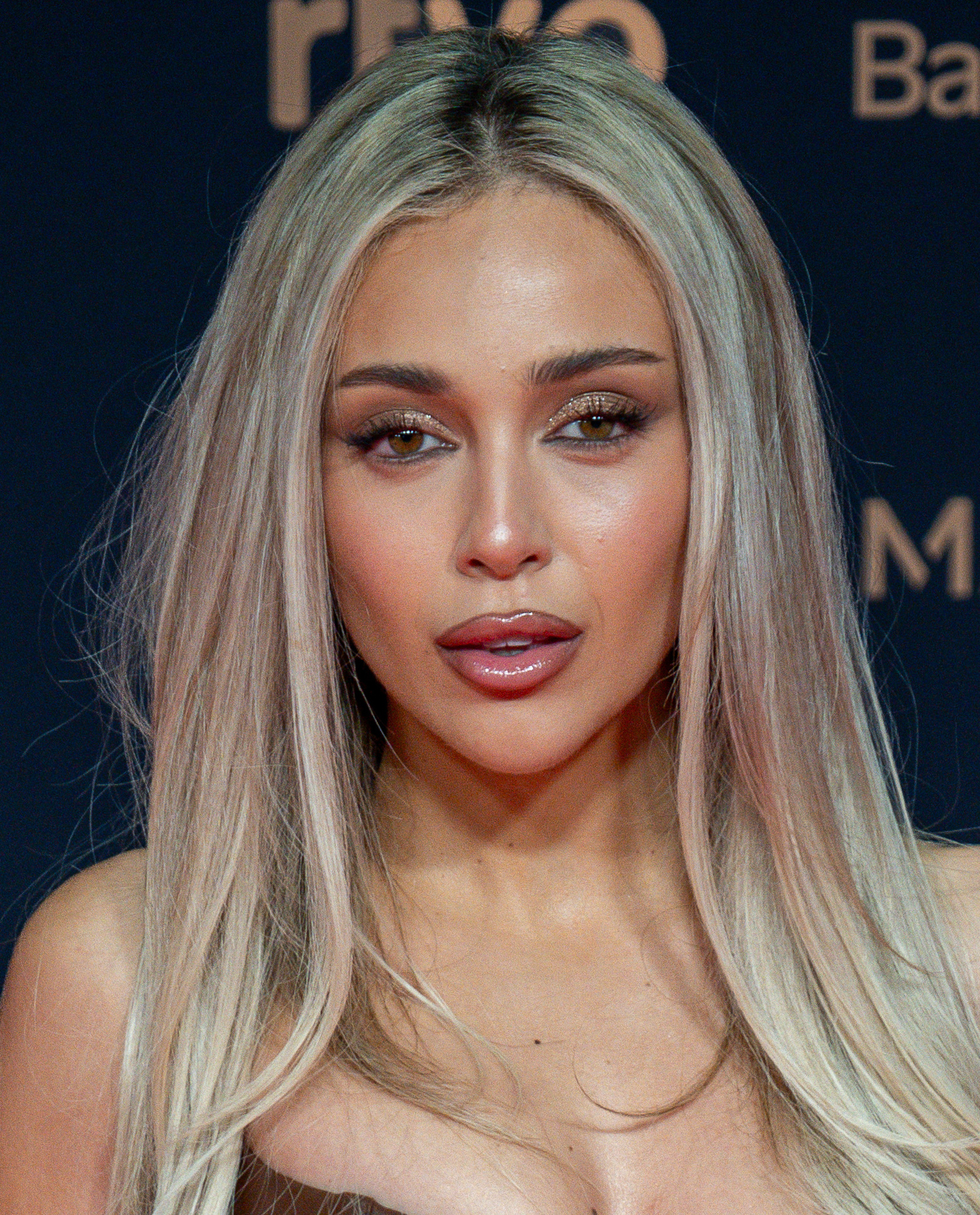
Ana Mena (11–present)

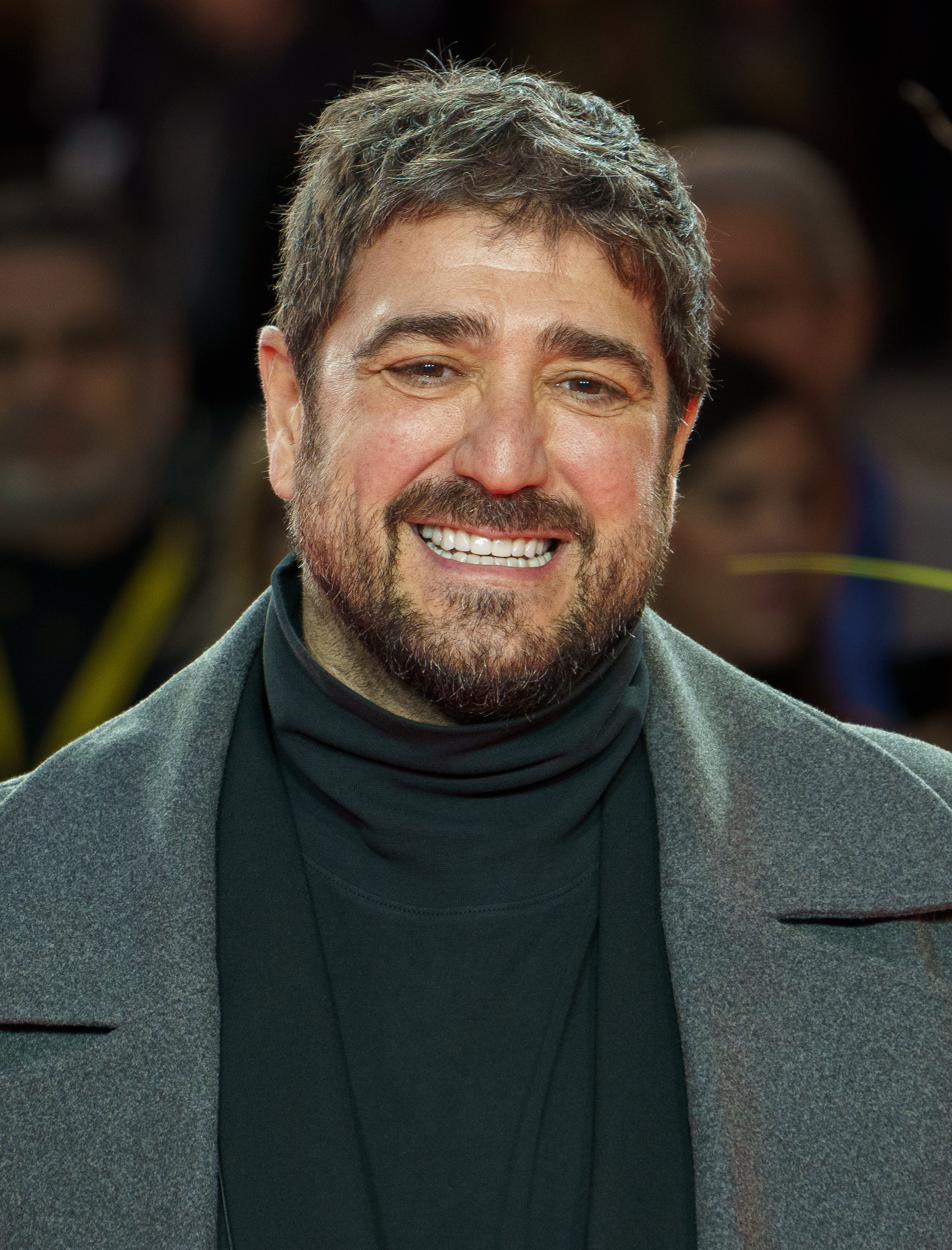
Antonio Orozco (3–4, 11–present)
Former coaches

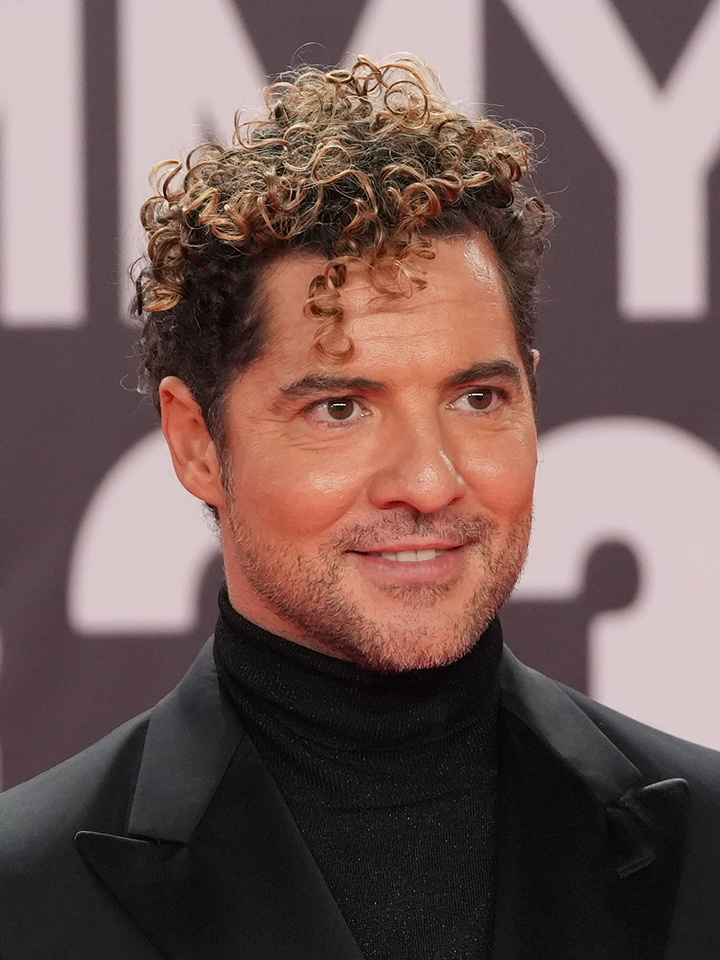
David Bisbal (1–3, 5–10)

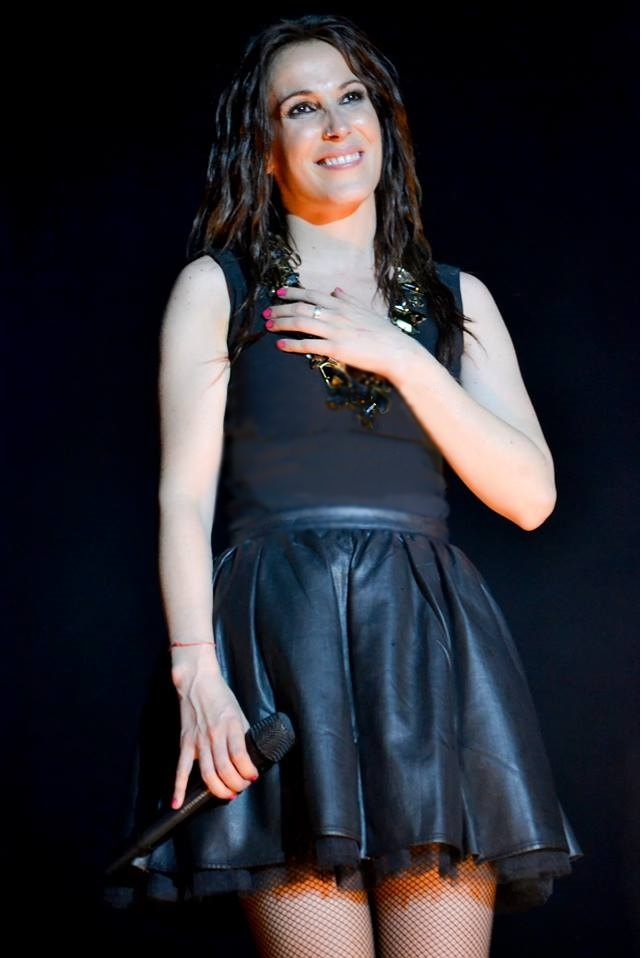
Malú (1)

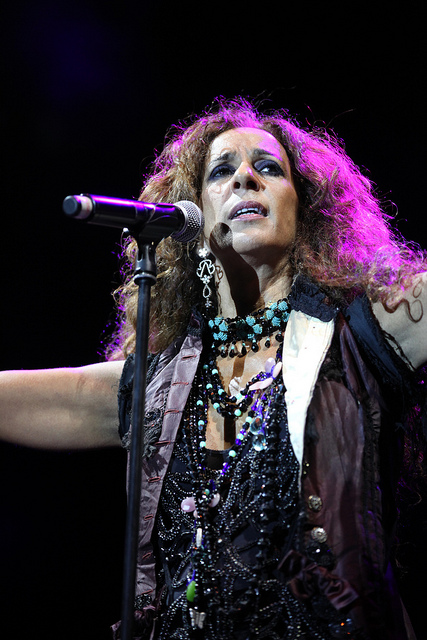
Rosario Flores (1–6, 8–9)

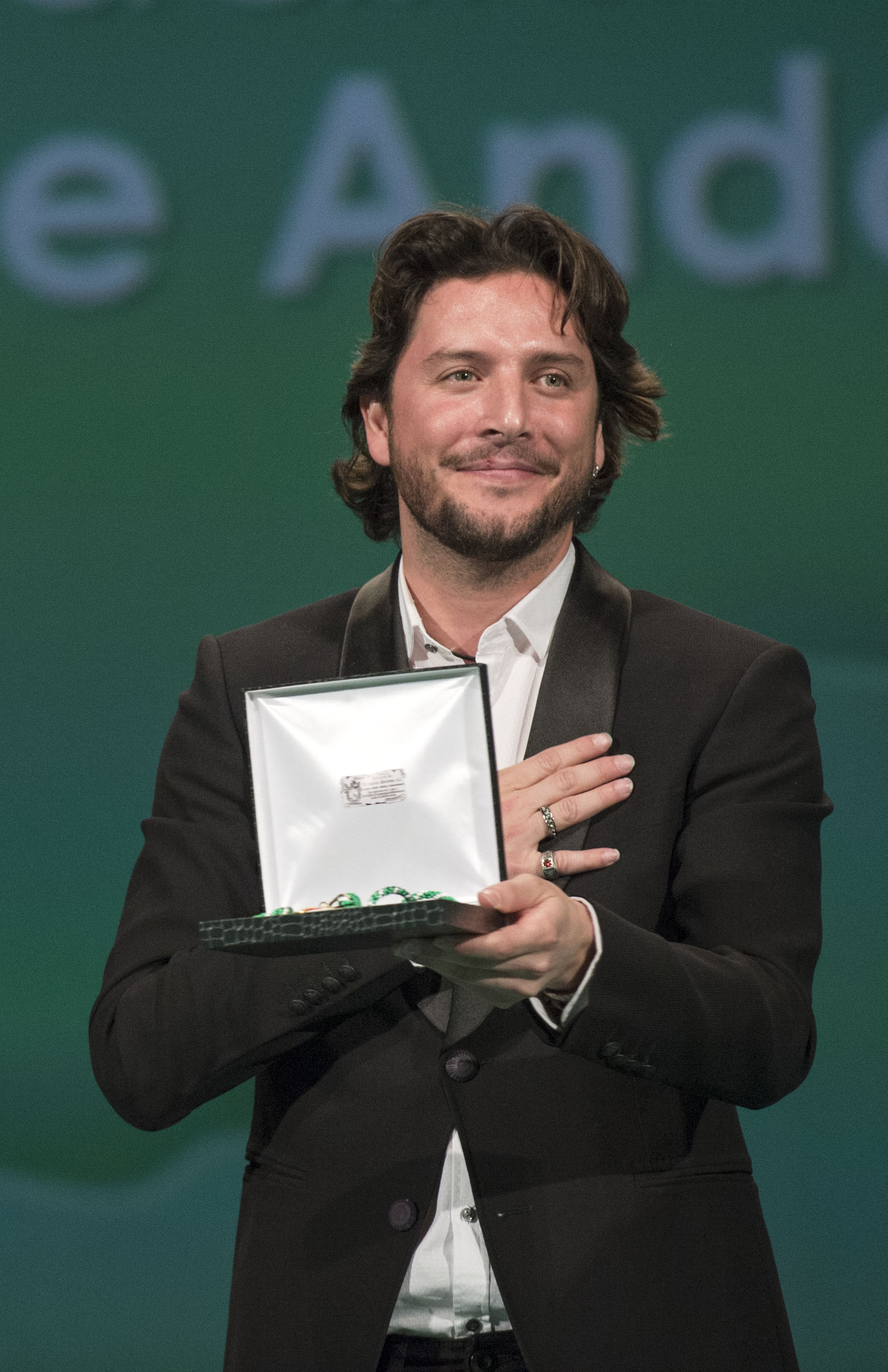
Manuel Carrasco (2)

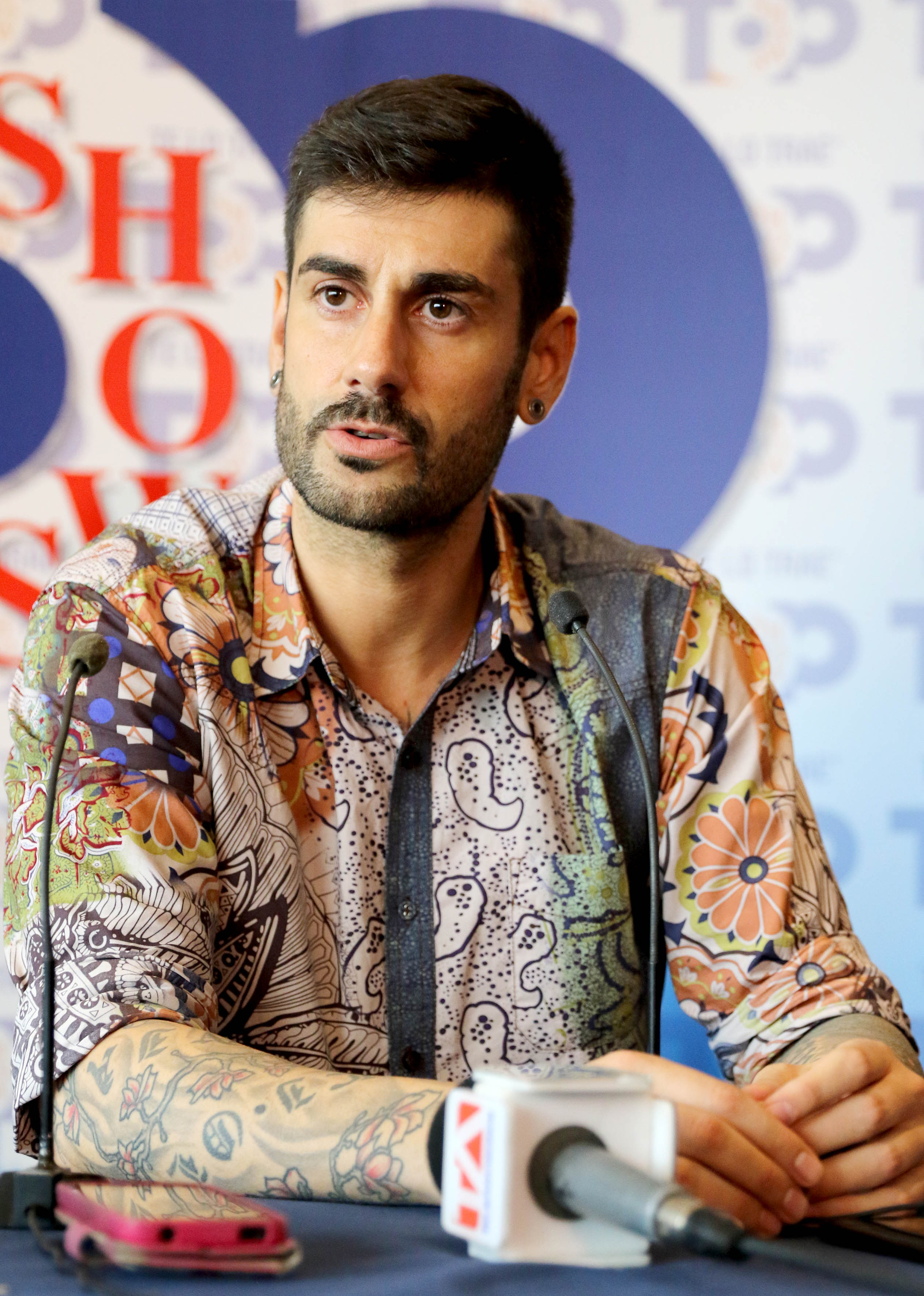
Melendi (4–6, 9)

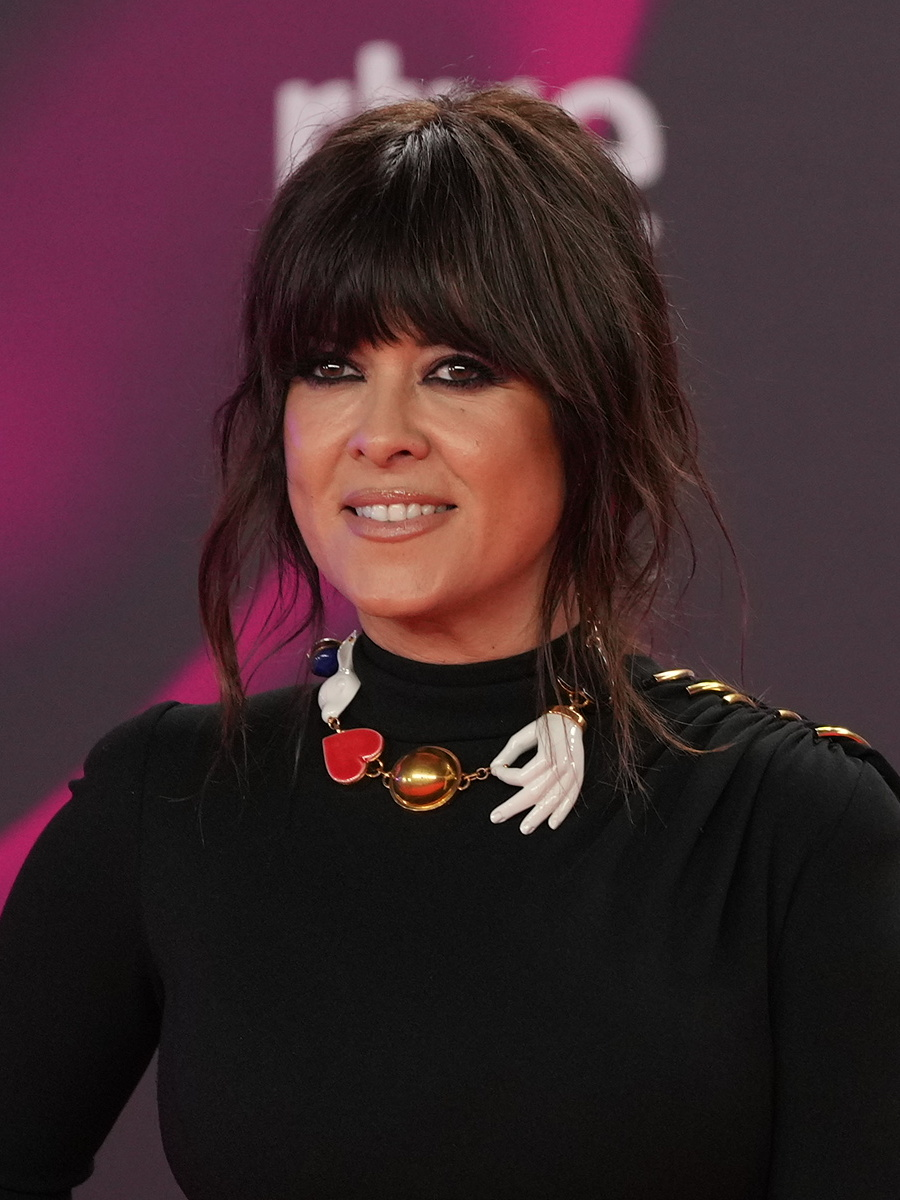
Vanesa Martín (5–6)

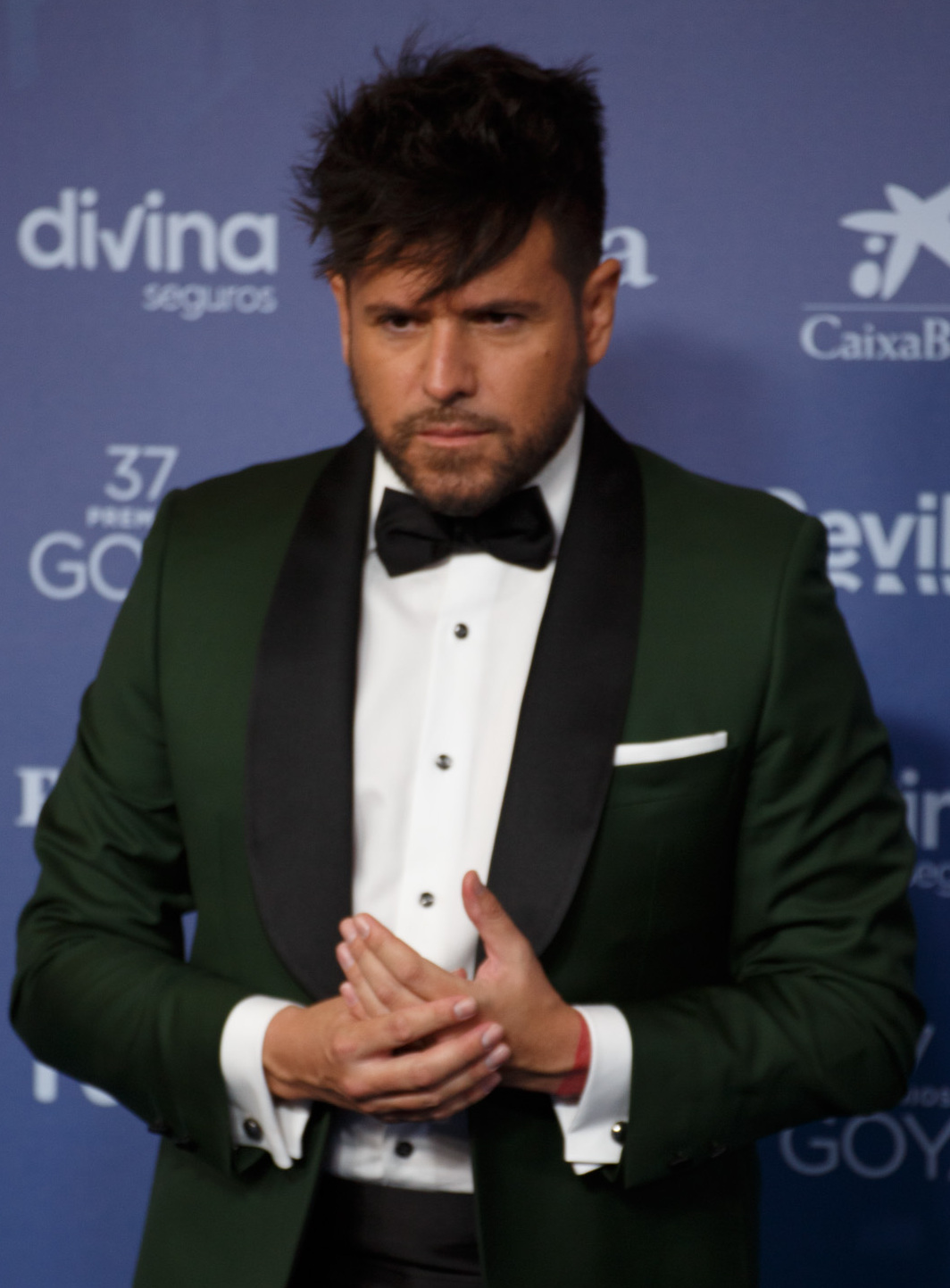
Pablo López (7)

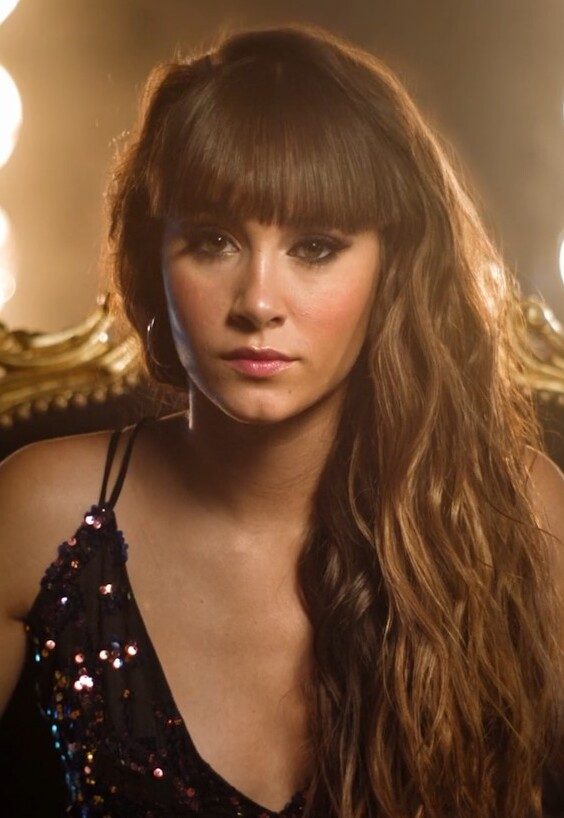
Aitana (7–8)

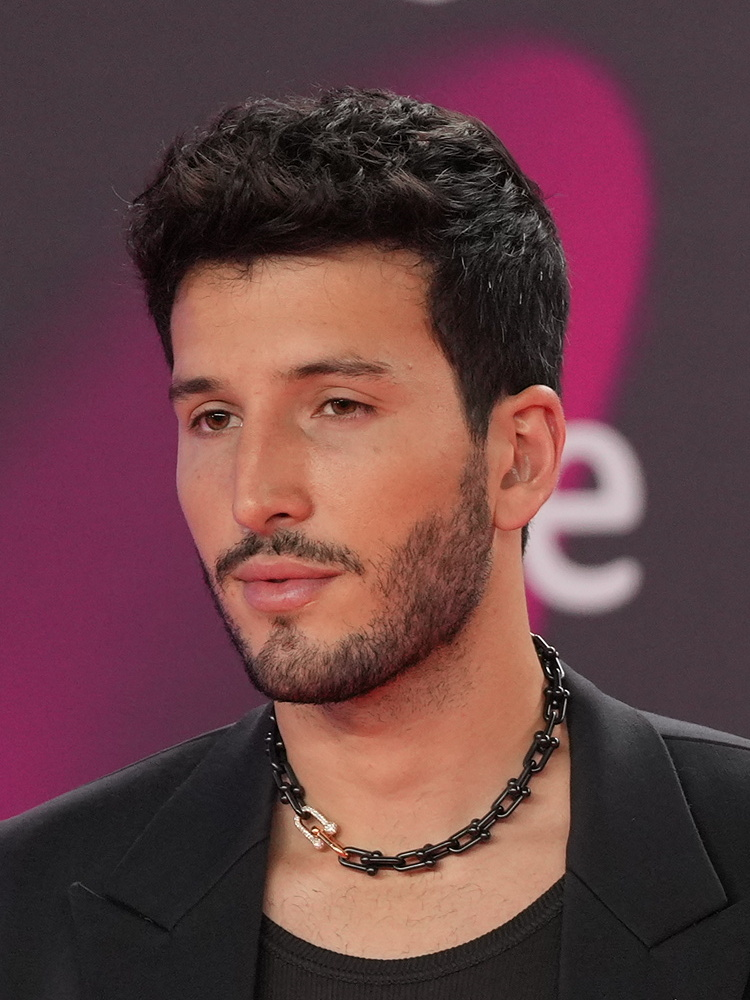
Sebastián Yatra (7–8)

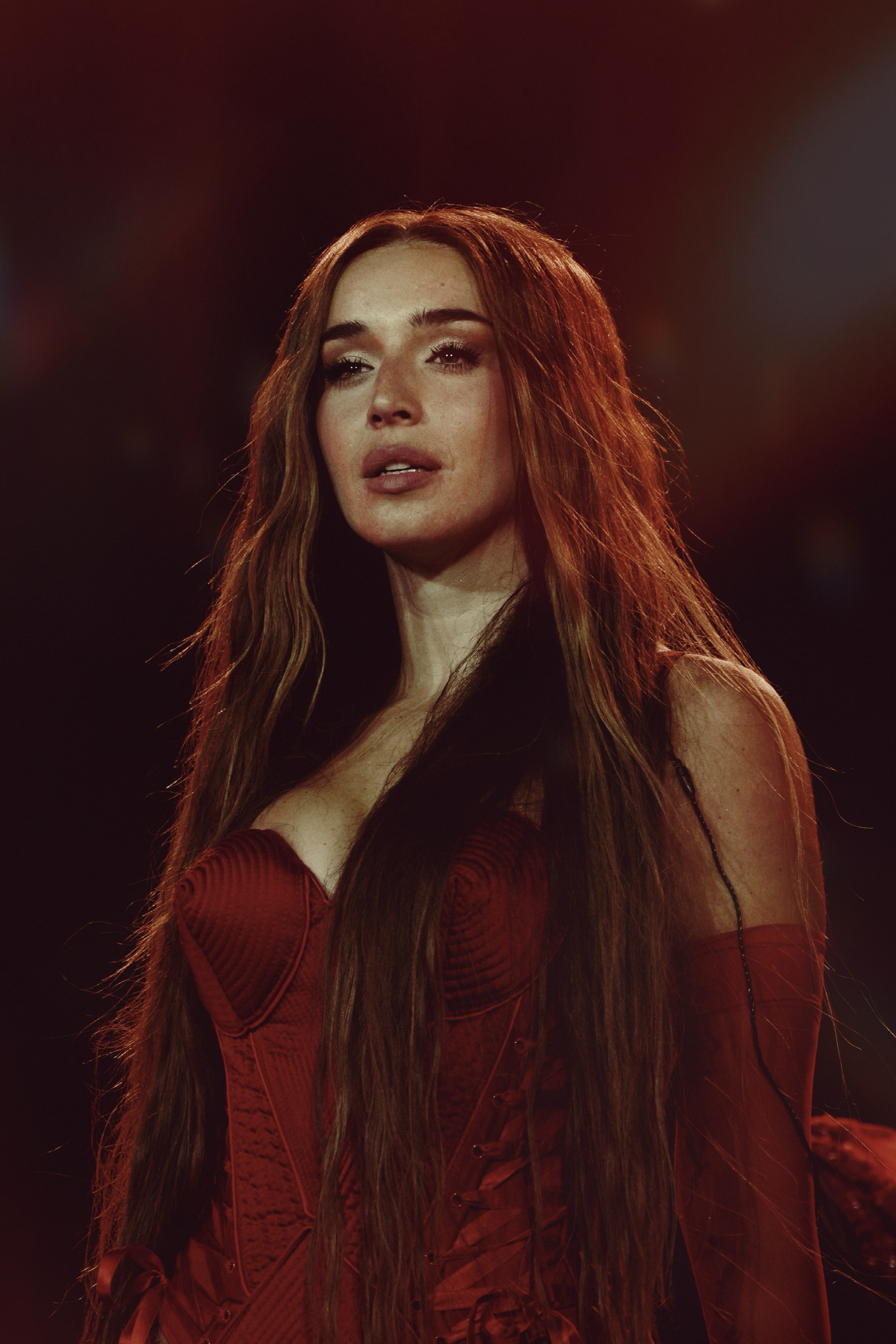
Lola Índigo (9–10)

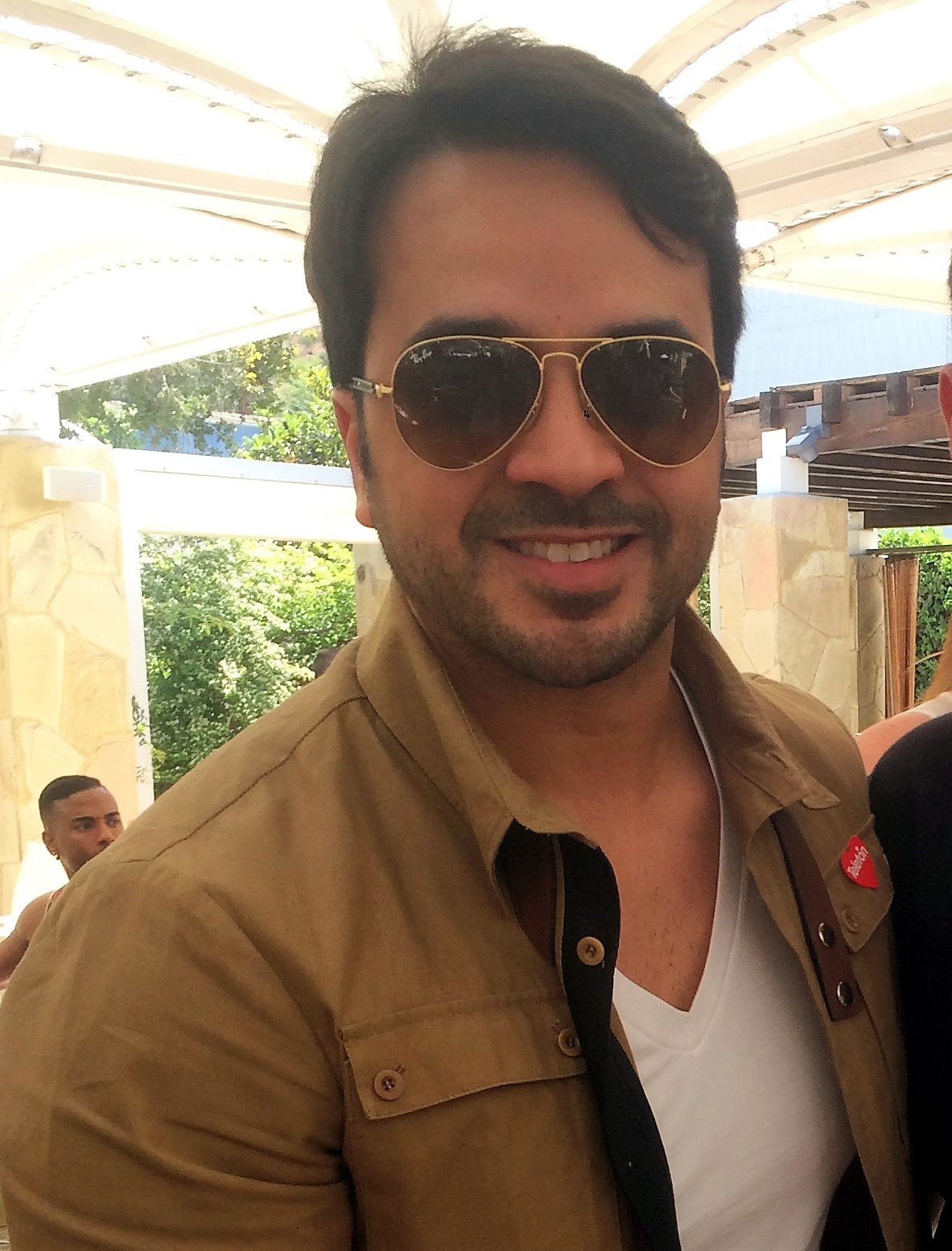
Luis Fonsi (11)

== Coaches' advisors ==
Season	Coaches			
1	David Bisbal	Rosario Flores	Malú	N/A
1	Antonio Orozco	Niña Pastori	Carlos Rivera	N/A
2	David Bisbal	Rosario Flores	Manuel Carrasco	N/A
2	Pablo López	Pastora Soler	Vanesa Martín	N/A
3	David Bisbal	Rosario Flores	Antonio Orozco	N/A
3	India Martínez	El Arrebato	Antonio José	N/A
4	Melendi	Rosario Flores	Antonio Orozco	N/A
4	Vanesa Martín	Rosana	Pablo López	N/A
5	David Bisbal	Rosario Flores	Vanesa Martín	Melendi
5	Niña Pastori	Lolita Flores	Pastora Soler	Arkano
6	David Bisbal	Rosario Flores	Vanesa Martín	Melendi
6	Aitana	Rozalén	Blas Cantó	Beret
7	David Bisbal	Aitana	Sebastián Yatra	Pablo López
7	Luis Fonsi	Evaluna Montaner	Lola Índigo	Antonio Orozco
8	David Bisbal	Rosario Flores	Aitana	Sebastián Yatra
8	Rosa López	La Mari	Dani Fernández	Rayden
9	David Bisbal	Lola Índigo	Rosario Flores	Melendi
9	Álvaro Soler	Judeline	El Kanka	Mau & Ricky
10	David Bisbal	Edurne	Lola Índigo	Manuel Turizo
10	Danna Paola	Natalia Lacunza	Rvfv	Kapo
11	Luis Fonsi	Edurne	Ana Mena	Antonio Orozco
11	Melody	Leire Martínez	Becky G	Antoñito Molina
12	Manuel Turizo	Edurne	Ana Mena	Antonio Orozco
12	Upcoming Season			

== Series overview ==
Warning: the following table presents a significant amount of different colors.

Teams color key
Artist from Team David	Artist from Team Melendi	Artist from Team Lola
Artist from Team Rosario	Artist from Team Vanesa	Artist from Team Edurne
Artist from Team Malú	Artist from Team Aitana	Artist from Team Turizo
Artist from Team Manuel	Artist from Team Yatra	Artist from Team Ana
Artist from Team Antonio	Artist from Team Pablo	Artist from Team Fonsi

Season	Aired	Winner	Runner-up	Third Place	Fourth Place	Winning coach	Presenters
1	2014	María Parrado	Triana Sánchez	Raúl Vidal	No Fourth Finalist	Malú	Jesús Vázquez
2	2015	José María Ruiz	Índigo Salvador	Javier Erro	No Fourth Finalist	Manuel Carrasco	Jesús Vázquez
3	2017	Rocío Aguilar	Antonio Lucena	Esperanza Garrido	No Fourth Finalist	Antonio Orozco	Jesús Vázquez
4	2018	Melani García	Flori Alexandra	Jeremai Cruz	No Fourth Finalist	Melendi	Jesús Vázquez
5	2019	Irene Gil	Daniel García	Sofía Esteban	Aysha Bengoetxea	David Bisbal	Eva González
6	2021	Levi Díaz	Nazaret Moreno	Lola Avilés	Rocío Avilés	Melendi	Eva González
7	2022	Pol Calvo	Marina Oliván	Triana Jiménez	Antonio Cortés	Pablo López	Eva González
8	2023	Rubén Franco	Lucía Baizán	Manuela de la Fuente	Amanda Sánchez	Sebastián Yatra	Eva González
9	2024	Alira Moya	Juan F. Morán	Rafael Mateo	Vera Lukash	David Bisbal	Eva González
10	2025	Lucas Paulano	Manuel Pato	Miguel Ramírez	Lucía Pascual	Manuel Turizo	Eva González
11	2026	Eduardo Sánchez	Lourdes Evolett	Marco Lahoz	Martina Pérez	Antonio Orozco	Eva González
12	2027	Upcoming Season					Eva González

== Seasons summaries ==
=== Coaches and finalists ===
– Winner
– Runner-up
– Third place
– Fourth place

Winners are in bold, remaining finalists are in italic and the eliminated contestants are in small font.

Season	David Bisbal	Rosario Flores	Malú	—N/a
1	Raúl Vidal "El Balilla"; Eva Ruiz; Carlos Alfredo Colina	Triana Sánchez; Alba Blázquez; Eric Abril	**María Parrado**; Pilar Bogado; Carlos Weinberg	—N/a
2	David Bisbal	Rosario Flores	Manuel Carrasco	—N/a
2	Javier Erro; Roger Corbalán	Índigo Salvador; Toñi Amador	**Jose María Ruiz**; Carmen Pendones	—N/a
3	David Bisbal	Rosario Flores	Antonio Orozco	—N/a
3	Esperanza Garrido; Dani Juanico; Mónica Maranillo	Antonio Díaz Lucena "Aray"; Sara Deop Perea; Antonio & Paco Cortés	**Rocío Aguilar**; Pedro Morales Bellido; Rocío Hernández	—N/a
4	Melendi	Rosario Flores	Antonio Orozco	—N/a
4	**Melani García Gaspar**; Lucía Frías Luna; Noemí Fernández	Jeremai Cruz; Nayra Gomar; Yastina Samper Yonaviciute	Flori Alexandra Cutitaru; Sara Ilarregui; Juanfri Castell	—N/a
5	David Bisbal	Rosario Flores	Vanesa Martín	Melendi
5	**Irene Gil**; Salvador Bermúdez	Daniel García; José Luís Sanzerito (Chavito)	Aysha Bengoetxea; Patricia García	Sofía Esteban; Julio Gómez
6	David Bisbal	Rosario Flores	Vanesa Martín	Melendi
6	Rocío Avilés; Manuel Ayra	Nazaret Moreno; Jesús Montero	Lola Avilés; Javier Crespo	**Levi Díaz**; Jesús del Río
7	David Bisbal	Aitana	Sebastián Yatra	Pablo López
7	Triana Jiménez; Irene Molina	Marina Oliván; Roberta Fauteck	Antonio Cortés; Marta Porris	**Pol Calvo**; Fran García
8	David Bisbal	Rosario Flores	Aitana	Sebastián Yatra
8	Lucía Baizán; Adrián Campos	Amanda Sánchez; Zhanel Ali	Manuela de la Fuente; Álvaro Tadeo	**Rubén Franco**; Béty Dumitru
9	David Bisbal	Lola Índigo	Rosario Flores	Melendi
9	**Alira Moya**; Mario Márquez	Rafael Mateo; Aitana Velásquez	Juan Francisco Morán; Rafael Amador	Vera Lukash; Martina Fernández
10	David Bisbal	Edurne	Lola Índigo	Manuel Turizo
10	Miguel Ramírez; Emilio Barrul	Manuel Pato; Isabel Buendía	Lucía Pascual; David Calvo	**Lucas Paulano**; Geraldine Aranda
11	Luis Fonsi	Edurne	Ana Mena	Antonio Orozco
11	Lourdes Evolett; Triana Castillejo	Martina Pérez; Mia Arias	Marco Lahoz; Erick Sucilla	**Eduardo Sánchez**; Leire Cornejo
12	Manuel Turizo	Edurne	Ana Mena	Antonio Orozco
12	Upcoming Season			

=== Season 1 ===
Premiere: 6 February 2014
Finale: 20 March 2014

Name	Age	Musical style	Advisors
**Malú**	32 years old	Flamenco, copla, pop	Carlos Rivera
**Rosario Flores**	50 years old	Pop, Pop rock, Rumba, Flamenco	Niña Pastori
**David Bisbal**	34 years old	Pop, Balada romántica, Latin pop	Antonio Orozco

=== Season 2 ===
Premiere: 7 September 2015
Finale: 26 October 2015

Name	Age	Musical style	Advisors
**Manuel Carrasco**	34 years old	Pop Latino	Vanesa Martin
**Rosario Flores**	51 years old	Pop, Pop rock, Rumba, Flamenco	Pastora Soler
**David Bisbal**	36 years old	Pop, Balada romántica, Latin pop	Pablo López

=== Season 3 ===
Premiere: 10 March 2017
Finale: 5 May 2017

Name	Age	Musical style	Advisors
**Antonio Orozco**	44 years old	Pop Latino	Antonio José
**Rosario Flores**	53 years old	Pop, Pop rock, Rumba, Flamenco	El Arrebato
**David Bisbal**	37 years old	Pop, Balada romántica, Latin pop	India Martínez

=== Season 4 ===
Premiere: 19 February 2018
Finale: 14 May 2018

Name	Age	Musical style	Advisors
**Melendi**	39 years old	Pop, Pop rock, Rock and Balada	Vanesa Martín
**Antonio Orozco**	45 years old	Latin pop	Pablo López
**Rosario Flores**	54 years old	Pop, Pop rock, Rumba, Flamenco	Rosana

=== Season 5 ===
Premiere: 16 September 2019
Finale: 27 December 2019

Name	Age	Musical style	Advisors
**David Bisbal**	40 years old	Latin pop and Balada	Niña Pastori
**Rosario Flores**	56 years old	Pop, Pop rock, Rumba, Flamenco	Lolita Flores
**Melendi**	40 years old	Pop, Pop rock, Rock and Balada	Arkano
**Vanesa Martín**	39 years old	Pop and Pop rock.	Pastora Soler

=== Season 6 ===
Premiere: 7 May 2021
Finale: 23 July 2021

Name	Age	Musical style	Advisors
**Melendi**	42 years old	Pop, Pop rock, Rock and Balada	Beret
**Rosario Flores**	57 years old	Pop, Pop rock, Rumba, Flamenco	Rozalén
**Vanesa Martín**	40 years old	Pop and Pop rock.	Blas Cantó
**David Bisbal**	42 years old	Latin pop and Balada	Aitana

=== Season 7 ===
Premiere: 27 May 2022
Finale: 22 July 2022

Name	Age	Musical style	Advisors
**Pablo López**	38 years old	Pop rock	Antonio Orozco
**Aitana**	23 years old	Pop and Pop rock	Evaluna Montaner
**David Bisbal**	43 years old	Latin pop and Balada pop	Luis Fonsi
**Sebastián Yatra**	27 years old	Pop, Latin pop, reggaeton	Lola Índigo

=== Season 8 ===
Premiere: 15 April 2023
Finale: 8 July 2023

Name	Age	Musical style	Advisors
**Sebastián Yatra**	28 years old	Pop, Latin pop, reggaeton	Rayden
**David Bisbal**	44 years old	Latin pop and Balada pop	Rosa López
**Aitana**	24 years old	Pop and Pop rock	Dani Fernández
**Rosario Flores**	59 years old	Pop, Pop rock, Rumba, Flamenco	La Mari

=== Season 9 ===
Premiere: 13 April 2024
Finale: 13 July 2024

Name	Age	Musical style	Advisors
**David Bisbal**	45 years old	Latin pop and Balada pop	Álvaro Soler
**Rosario Flores**	60 years old	Pop, Pop rock, Rumba, Flamenco	El Kanka
**Lola Índigo**	32 years old	Latin pop, Reggaeton, Electropop	Judeline
**Melendi**	45 years old	Pop, Pop rock, Rock, Balada	Mau & Ricky

=== Season 10 ===
Premiere: 3 May 2025
Finale: 19 July 2025

Name	Age	Musical style	Advisors
**Manuel Turizo**	25 years old	Latin Pop, Reggaeton, Urban pop	Kapo
**Edurne**	39 years old	Pop, Rock, Electropop	Natalia Lacunza
**David Bisbal**	46 years old	Latin pop and Balada pop	Danna Paola
**Lola Índigo**	33 years old	Latin pop, Reggaeton, Electropop	Rvfv

=== Season 11 ===
Premiere: 9 May 2026
Finale: 25 July 2026

Name	Age	Musical style	Advisors
**Antonio Orozco**	53 years old	Latin pop	Antoñito Molina
**Luis Fonsi**	48 years old	Latin Pop, Pop rock, Reggaeton	Melody
**Ana Mena**	29 years old	Pop, Latin pop, Dance-pop	Becky G
**Edurne**	40 years old	Pop, Rock, Electropop	Leire Martínez

=== Season 12 ===
Name	Age	Musical style	Advisors
**Manuel Turizo**	27 years old	Latin pop, Reggaeton, Urban pop	**TBA (To Be Announced)**
**Edurne**	41 years old	Pop, Rock, Electropop	**TBA (To Be Announced)**
**Ana Mena**	30 years old	Pop, Latin pop, Dance-pop	**TBA (To Be Announced)**
**Antonio Orozco**	54 years old	Latin pop	**TBA (To Be Announced)**
