= Levi Díaz =

Spanish singer (born 2008)

- Born: Levi Díaz; 11 August 2008 (age 18); Cornellà de Llobregat
- Origin: Spain
- Genre: Pop
- Instruments: Vocals
- Years active: 2019–present
- Label: Universal Music Spain

Levi Díaz (born 11 August 2008) is a Spanish singer who first rose to fame in 2021, where he won the sixth season of La Voz Kids, as part of team Melendi.

== Biography ==
Díaz was born on 11 August 2008 in Cornellà de Llobregat. He currently studies music with vocal coach Miguel Manzo, in addition to academic studies.

== Career ==
=== Early years ===
In February 2019, Díaz won the first edition of La Voz de Cornellà, in the youth category and additionally the audience award for most charismatic contestant.

=== La Voz Kids ===
Díaz competed in the reality competition La Voz Kids twice. In 2019, he auditioned with "We've Only Just Begun" by The Carpenters but was eliminated in the episode. Two years later, Díaz returned to compete in sixth season and won, being the first former participant to return to the series in a later season and win altogether.

La Voz Kids performances and results
Episode	Song	Original Artist	Result
Season 5 (2019)
Audition	"We've Only Just Begun"	The Carpenters	Eliminated
Season 6 (2021)
Audition	"Warrior"	Demi Lovato	Joined team Melendi; through to Battle Rounds
Battle Rounds	"Diamonds"	Rihanna	Through to the Knockouts
The Knockouts	"Warrior"	Demi Lovato	Through to live shows
Semi-Final	"Alive"	Sia	Saved by coach
Grand Final	"Never Enough"	Loren Allred	Winner
Grand Final	"Ojalá" (with Beret)	Beret	Winner
Grand Final	"Mama no" (with Pablo López)	Pablo López	Winner

=== Junior Eurovision Song Contest 2021 ===
Díaz was chosen as Spanish entrant in the 19th annual Junior Eurovision Song Contest 16 September 2021. His song "Reír", written by David Roma, was released on 18 October with a lyric video filmed throughout Madrid.

At the contest in Paris, "Reír" placed 15th in a field of 19 songs, receiving 77 points, making it the lowest placing Spain achieved so far. Despite the loss, the positive response was overwhelming. Shortly after the competition, RTVE's Head of Delegation Eva Mora said she was proud of Díaz for representing Spain.

Díaz later performed "Reír" on RTVE's televised concert ¡Feliz 2022! and again with a full orchestra during Gala de Reyes.

== Artistry ==
=== Influences ===
Díaz is influenced by modern pop music and is a big fan of Rosalía.

== Personal life ==
On 31 May 2022, Díaz came out as gay.

== Discography ==
=== Singles ===
Title	Year	Album
"Reír"	2021	Non-album singles

=== Guest appearances ===
Title	Year	Album
"Warrior"	2021	La Voz Kids 2021
"Alive"	2021	La Voz Kids 2021
"Never Enough"	2021	La Voz Kids 2021

Awards and achievements
Preceded by Soleá with "Palante"	Spain in the Junior Eurovision Song Contest; 2021	Succeeded by Carlos Higes with "Señorita"
