= Vanesa Martín Mata =

Spanish singer

Vanesa Martín
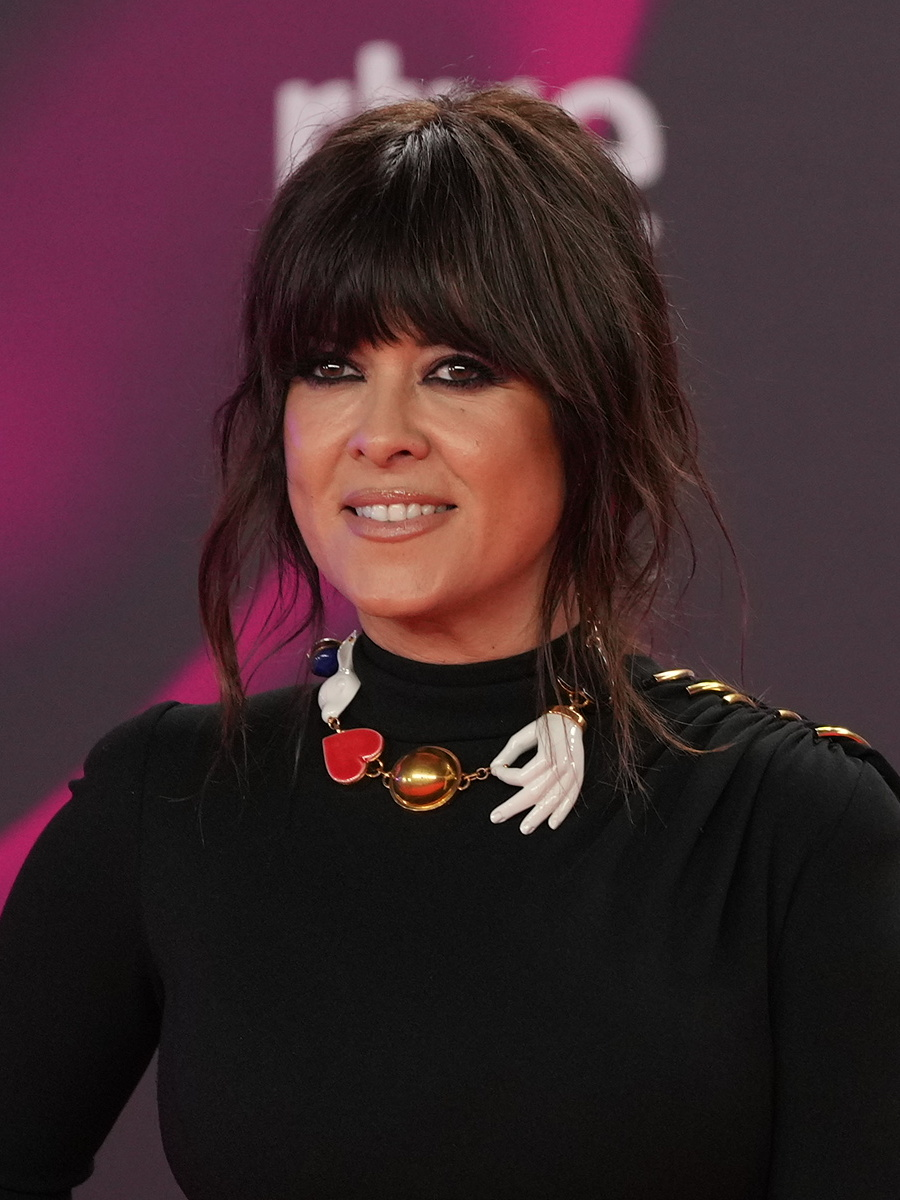
- Martín in 2023
- Born: María Vanesa Martín Mata; 14 November 1980 (age 45); Málaga, Spain
- Occupations: Singer, songwriter and poet
- Years active: 2006–present

María Vanesa Martín Mata (born 14 November 1980) is a Spanish singer, poet, and songwriter. Her first appearance on an album was on the CD called El búho real. Her first album was titled Agua and was released in 2006. In 2009, she signed with the multinational Warner Music. To date, she has released seven studio albums: Agua (2006), Trampas (2009), Cuestión de piel (2012), Crónica de un baile (2014), Munay (2016), Todas las mujeres que habitan en mí (2018), Siete veces sí (2020).

She has sold thousands of copies in Spain and Latin America and has performed a large number of concerts throughout the Spanish geography. She has collaborated with artists such as Pablo Alborán, India Martínez, Malú, Pastora Soler, Chenoa, David DeMaría, El Arrebato, Manuel Lombo, Diana Navarro, among others.

== Biography ==
=== Beginnings ===
Vanesa Martín Mata was born in Málaga on November 14, 1980. When she was six years old, her father gave her her first guitar, and from that moment on, her love for music began. Later, she decided to start her guitar training, through coros rocieros, and soon after, she would start writing her first songs. At the age of fifteen, she performed in many local venues in Málaga and appeared on television and local radio programs. At the end of 2003, after graduating in teaching and pedagogy at the University of Málaga, she settled in Madrid, where she performed her first concerts in the bar El Taburete.

=== 2006–2008: Agua ===
She was signed by the music company EMI Music Spain in 2005, and the first studio album, Agua, was launched on June 15, 2006. The album was produced by Carlos Jean and directed by Raúl Quílez. It was recorded in the studios by Jean Roche, Jean Madrid, and RedLed S.A. The album consisted of 12 songs composed by her.

This album was re-released in 2007, including a version of the song Durmiendo sola, performed as a duet with David DeMaría, and also the song Lluvia. On the occasion of the release of her first album, she toured most of Spain with a concert tour. In the following years, she composed songs for artists such as Manuel Lombo, India Martínez, María Toledo, and Pastora Soler.

=== 2009–2011: Trampas ===
She signed with the multinational Warner Music in 2009 and released her second studio album,Trampas. It was released on September 22, 2009, and was produced in Milan by the Italian Bob Benozzo, producer of Alejandro Sanz, Chambao, Ricardo Montaner, Ana Belén, among others. It consists of 12 songs composed by Vanesa Martín.

With this album, she manages to enter for the first time in the sales list of the best-selling albums in the country (PROMUSICAE) and receives the 2009 Dial Award, which Cadena Dial gives to the best national artist of the year. At the end of that year, she embarks on a concert tour of Spanish theaters, including the Teatro Lope de Vega in Seville, the Teatro Cervantes in Málaga, the Teatro Falla in Cádiz, the Teatro Villamarta in Jerez, and the Gran Teatro in Huelva.

In 2010, she re-released the album Trampas, which includes the song Perdiendo el equilibrio and the DVD of the concert held on March 21, 2010 at the Teatro Cervantes in Málaga.

=== 2012–2013: Cuestión de piel ===
The first single from her next album, Tic tac, was released on January 16, 2012, prior to the album. On February 28, 2012, she released her third album Cuestión de piel. This album is produced by David Santisteban and consists of 15 songs composed by herself. It includes collaborations with Malú, Pablo Alborán, La Mari de Chambao, and the guitarist José Antonio Rodríguez.

On October 16, 2012, the album Ven, siéntate y me lo cuentas... This work was the result of the recording of the acoustic concert she gave on September 17, 2012, at the Fundación el Olivar de Castillejo (Madrid). A re-release of Cuestión de piel was also published in CD + DVD format, which includes the two released CDs and the DVD of the acoustic concert. This acoustic in addition to the songs from her three albums, includes an unreleased track Adiós de mayowith the collaboration of José A. Rodríguez and two songs composed by Vanesa that were released on their respective albums: 90 minutos (India Martínez) and Ya no más (María Toledo).

On April 6, 2013, she performs for the first time with the singer Malú in the concert held at the Teatro de la Axerquía (Córdoba). In the same year she is awarded by the Andalusian Institute of Youth as Young Art Award 2013.

=== 2014–2016: Crónica de un baile ===
She presents through YouTube Sin saber por qué, first single from what will be her fourth studio album Crónica de un baile on June 21, 2014. Already on September 1, 2014, the album goes on sale in Málaga, her hometown. The next day it is released in the rest of Spain, On October 8 of the same year, the tour Crónica de un baile which toured the main Spanish cities throughout 2014 and 2015, starts at the Teatro Principal of Alicante, with all the tickets sold. On November 4, it was presented through the RTVE website that she would be part of the new program of this channel: Hit-La Canción. For this she had to compete with other national artists such as Sergio Dalma, Pastora Soler, Melendi, Marta Sánchez, Bustamante, and Rosa López.

On January 2, 2015, minutes after the premiere of Hit-La Canción, she received the gold disc from Sergio Dalma for her album Crónica de un baile. That same night, the finalist song chosen by the composer from Málaga was Un minuto más by Danae Segovia. During the summer, it was confirmed that she would be an advisor to the singer Manuel Carrasco in the Telecinco program La Voz Kids.

She gave a concert at the Teatro Auditorio de Roquetas de Mar on January 9, 2016. In March of that same year, she publishes her first book Mujer Océano which collects a variety of poems written by everything that has been able to soak her soul, and performs the closing of the tour of Crónica de un baile in Barcelona.

=== 2016–2017: Munay y Munay vivo ===
On November 18, 2016, her new studio album Munay was released. During the months of November and December, she makes 12 record signings in different cities. In February 2017, she gets the platinum record in Spain for this album.

For its promotion she made the Munay Tour was a tour that covered more than 20 cities between Latin America and Spain, and began on February 24, 2017 at the Palacio Martin Carpena in Málaga.

=== 2018–2019: Todas las mujeres que habitan en mí ===
Her sixth studio album Todas las mujeres que habitan en mí was released on November 16, 2018, features the direction and production of Eric Rosse, with co-production by Vanesa herself, and the arranging team José Marín and Tony Romero. The album was mixed and mastered by Chris Reynolds. It was recorded at Squawkbox Studios (Los Angeles), Cyclops Sound (Van Nuys) and Sunset Sound (Hollywood). This album managed to exceed 40,000 copies sold and went platinum.

On November 29, 2019, the reissue of the album was released, which changed the color of its cover to pink. It contained the 16 songs of the single edition and 4 bonus tracks including Caída libre. It also featured a DVD that brought a documentary En el aire, which showed images of the tour, several tracks recorded at their September 27, 2019 concert at the WiZink Center in Madrid, 5 acoustic tracks recorded for Sesiones Movistar, and 6 video clips.

=== 2020–present: Siete veces sí, Quiero enamorarme ===
Prior to the release of her seventh studio album, she released the singles ... y vuelo, and La huella. Finally, her new album, Siete veces sí, was released on October 23 of the same year.

In 2026, she sang the opening theme song for the Mexican telenovela Guardián de mi vida, entitled "Quiero enamorarme". The song was released on May 27 of the same year.

== Discography ==
=== Studio albums ===
- 2006: Agua
- 2009: Trampas
- 2012: Cuestión de piel
- 2014: Crónica de un baile
- 2016: Munay
- 2018: Todas las mujeres que habitan en mí
- 2020: Siete veces sí

== Music tours ==
- Gira Agua.
- Gira Trampas.
- Gira Cuestión de piel.
- Gira Crónica de un baile (2014-2016).
- Gira Munay (2017-2018).
- Gira Todas Las Mujeres Que Habitan En Mí (2019-2020).
- Gira Sie7e Veces Sí (2021-2022).

== Filmography ==
=== Television programs ===
| Año | Programa | Notas | ref. |
|---|---|---|---|
| 2015 | La Voz Kids 2 | Advisor | |
| 2018 | La Voz Kids 4 | Advisor | |
| 2019 | La Voz Kids 5 | Coach | |
| 2020 | Mask Singer | Jury (Substitute) | |
| 2021 | La Voz Kids 6 | Coach | |
| 2024 | Factor X | Judge | |
| 2026 | La Voz 13 | Second Chance | |

== Awards and nominations ==
- 2019 - Cadena Dial Award.
- 2019 - Ondas Award for best musical communication.
- 2019 - LOS40 Music Award for National Videoclip of the Year.
- 2020 - Odeon Award Best Female Artist.
- 2020 - Medal of Andalusia.
- 2020 - Nominated for 'Best Singer of the Year' at the HOY Magazine Awards.
