= India Martínez =

Spanish flamenco and pop singer (born 1985)

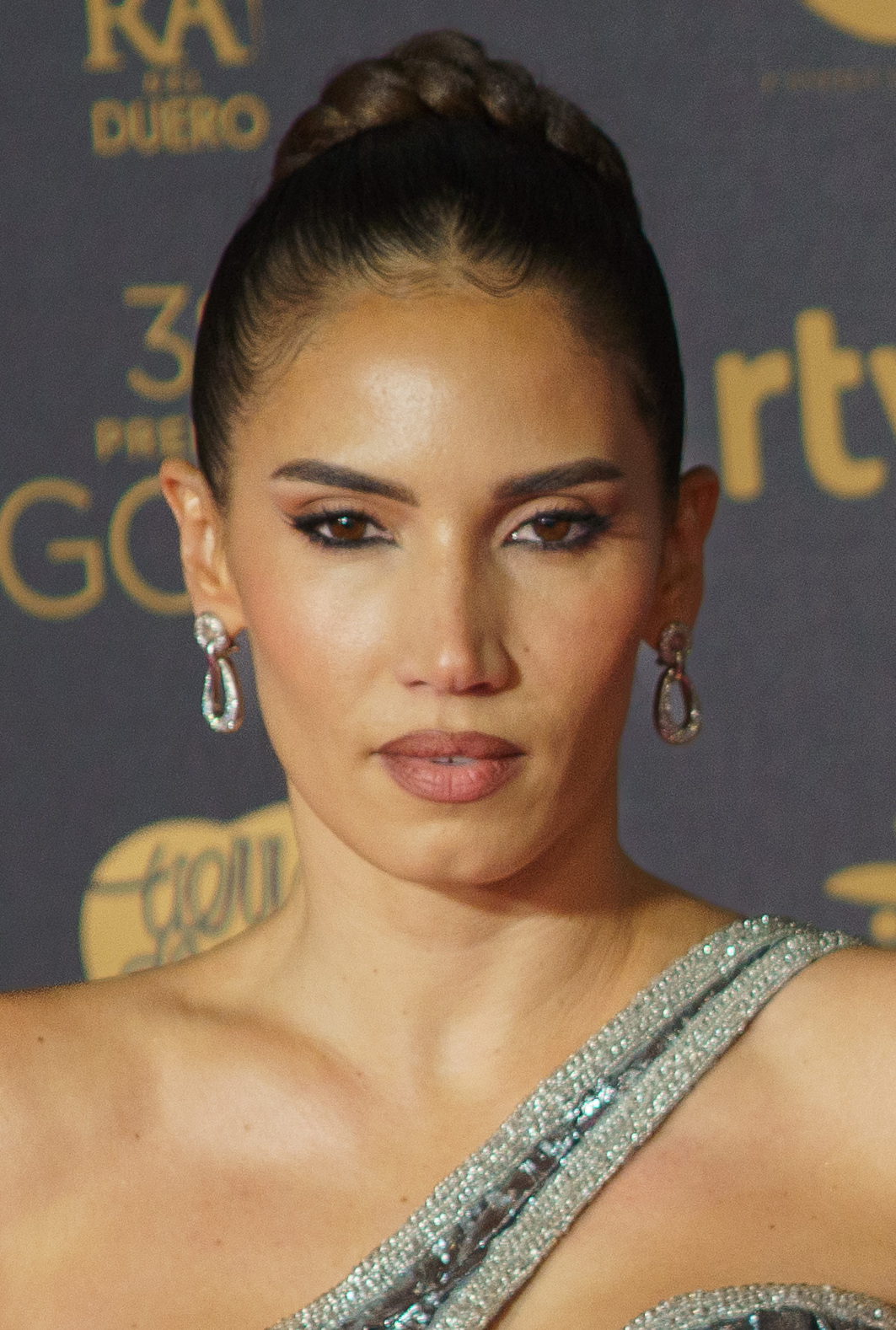
- Martínez at the 38th Goya Awards red carpet in 2024

Background information
- Also known as: La Niña del Puerto
- Born: Jenifer Yésica Martínez Fernández; October 13, 1985 (age 40); Córdoba, Spain
- Genres: Flamenco; Pop
- Occupations: Singer; songwriter
- Instruments: Vocals
- Years active: 1998–present
- Label: Sony Music Entertainment España

Jenifer Yésica Martínez Fernández (born October 13, 1985), known professionally as India Martínez, is a Spanish flamenco–pop singer.

Martínez was nominated for the Latin Grammy Award for Best New Artist at the Latin Grammy Awards of 2009. She won the Premio Cadena Dial 2011 award for the album Trece Verdades, which was certified platinum. She is signed to Sony Music Entertainment. In 2015, Martínez won the Goya award for Best Original Song with Niño Sin Miedo, included in the film El Niño.

== Early life ==
Martínez was born on October 13, 1985, in Córdoba, Spain. She was introduced to flamenco through dance classes with Nieves Camacho in Córdoba at the age of 5. At 11 years old, she moved with her parents to Puerto de Roquetas de Mar in Almería, Spain. A year later, she began singing and started using the nickname "La Niña del Puerto". Her stage name was created by her first manager when she signed her first record contract at age 17.

== Career ==
Martínez made her first television appearance in 1998 on the program Veo, Veo, presented by Teresa Rabal, where she was among the finalists. In 2000, she was awarded a prize for promising young performers. In 2001, she participated in a contest of tarantos and tarantas, as well as the Contest of Flamenco Between Quejíos and Pitas held in San José (Almería), winning Best Performance, the Audience Award, and a scholarship from the Cristina Heeren Foundation to study flamenco in Seville. The following year, she performed at the IV Encuentro de Peñas Flamencas de Almería at the Hotel Playadulce in Roquetas de Mar, alongside Triana Pura. In the same year, she also performed at the II Noche Flamenca in Roquetas de Mar.

In 2001, she attended a tribute to Fosforito and José Sorroche, held at the restaurant La Juaida, as a guest artist and obtained the second prize in the Contest of Trilleros organized by Peña Antonio de Torres de la Cañada. She soloed performed in Almería pubs, in the Villaespesa Library, and in Peña El Palangre de Roquetas de Mar. She took part in the Easter Proclamation, held at the Apolo Theater, as well as the Mister Almería pageant held in the Llanos de Vícar. She performed in recitals held at the Library of Murcia on several occasions and, during her stay at the Cristina Heeren Foundation in Seville, at the festival held at La Alameda, where she sang for dancing for the first time.

In 2003, she signed a contract with "La Voz del Sur," which released her first album, Azulejos de Lunares, in 2004. This first album contained arrangements of classic boleros and tangos by José María Cortina.

In 2009, she was nominated for a Latin Grammy Award for Best New Artist. She has won three Cadena Dial awards: in 2011, for her album Trece Verdades; in 2013; and in 2017 for Te Cuento un Secreto. In 2015, she won the Goya for Best Song for the film El Niño, directed by Daniel Monzón. She collaborated with artists including David Bisbal, Paulo Gonzo, Pitingo, Pablo Alborán, Vanesa Martín, and La Oreja de Van Gogh. In February 2017, she was awarded the Medal of Andalusia.

Her second album, Despertar, was released in 2009. On this album, the singer paid tribute to her deceased grandfather in two songs: a cover of Antonio Molina's song "Adiós a España" and "La Voz de un Marinero." This album was also nominated for Best Production.

In 2011, she released her third album, Trece Verdades, with the song "Vencer al amor" as the first single. The song reached the top three of the Spanish singles chart and was certified a Gold Record. A year later the album Otras Verdades was released with her own versions of songs by well-known artists such as Luis Fonsi and Camila. The album was nominated for a Latin Grammy Award in the category Best Traditional Pop Vocal Album. It was certified Platinum. In 2013, she released her fifth album, Camino de la Buena Suerte, which was certified Gold. In 2014, her release Dual (which also went platinum) compiled duets with national and international artists such as David Bisbal on "Olvidé Respirar," Enrique Iglesias on "Loco," and Abel Pintos on "Corazón Hambriento."

In 2014, she performed at Palacio de los Deportes in Madrid and started her sixth tour to promote her album of duets, Dual.

== Discography ==
=== Albums ===
Year	Album	Chart peak SPA	Certification
2004	Azulejos de Lunares	–	
2009	Despertar	–	
2011	Trece verdades	8	Platinum
2012	Otras verdades	2	Platinum
2013	Camino de la buena suerte	3	Gold
2014	Dual	2	Platinum
2016	Te cuento un secreto	1	Platinum
2019	Palmeras	4	
2022	Nuestro mundo	11	
2025	Aguachile		

=== Singles ===
Year	Single	Chart peak SPA	Certification	Album
2004	"Sobrellevé"	—		Azulejos de Lunares
2009	"Amanece el día"	—		Despertar
2009	"Anna"	—		Despertar
2011	"Vencer al amor"	3		Trece verdades
2012	"90 Minutos"	5		Trece verdades
2012	"Manuela"	—		Trece verdades
2012	"Naturaleza" (with Estopa)	25		Non-album single
2012	"Hoy"	6		Otras verdades
2013	"Los gatos no ladran"	25		Camino de la buena suerte
2014	"Si me ves" (with Manuel Carrasco)	29		Dual
2014	"Niño sin miedo" (featuring Rachid Taha)	—		Dual
2014	"Olvidé respirar" (featuring David Bisbal)	27		Dual
2016	"Todo no es casualidad"	9		Non-album singles
2016	"Angel"	31		Non-album singles
2022	"Si ella supiera" (featuring Melendi)	53		Non-album singles
2024	"Las Burbujas del Jacuzzi" (with Greeicy and Lele Pons)			Non-album singles
