= Lola Índigo discography =

Discography of Spanish recording artist

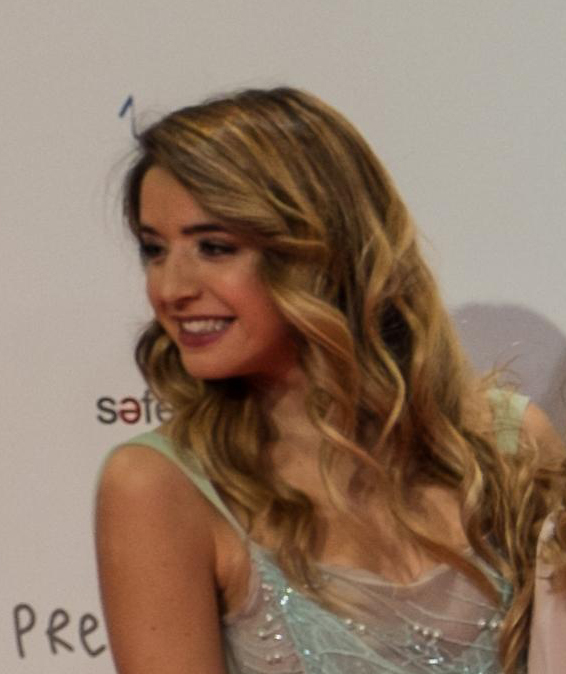
- Lola Índigo in 2018
- Studio albums: 4
- EPs: 1
- Singles: 51
- Promotional singles: 8

The discography of Spanish recording artist Lola Índigo consists of four studio albums, one extended play, fifty-one singles (including one as a featured artist) and eight promotional singles.

Índigo debuted with single "Ya no quiero ná" (I No Longer Want Anything) which became a commercial success in her native Spain reaching no. 3. With her debut album Akelarre (2019) spawned her following Top 10, "Mujer bruja" with Mala Rodríguez.

Her next singles "Me quedo" with fellow singer Aitana reached no. #6 and her collaboration with Don Patricio, "Lola Bunny" reached no. #4. The release of her second studio album La niña (2021) spawned "La niña de la escuela" which peaked at number nine.

From her third studio album El dragón (2023) the single "El tonto" with canarian singer Quevedo reached number one of the chart. Her first and only yet. Her last soloist release "La Reina" debuted at #6 and peaked at #4.

== Studio albums ==
List of studio albums, with selected details and chart positions
| Title | Details | Peaks | Certifications |
| Title | Details | SPA | Certifications |
|---|---|---|---|
| Akelarre | Released: 17 May 2019; Label: Universal Music Spain; Formats: CD, digital download, streaming, LP | 1 | PROMUSICAE: Gold |
| La Niña | Released: 2 July 2021; Label: Universal Music Spain; Formats: CD, digital download, streaming, LP | 1 | PROMUSICAE: Gold |
| El Dragón | Released: 14 April 2023; Label: Universal Music Spain; Formats: CD, digital download, streaming, LP | 1 | PROMUSICAE: Platinum |
| Nave Dragón | Released: 27 March 2025; Label: Universal Music Spain; Formats: CD, digital download, streaming, LP | 2 | PROMUSICAE: Platinum |

== EPs ==
List of extended plays, with selected details and chart positions
| Title | Details | Peaks | Certifications |
| Title | Details | SPA | Certifications |
|---|---|---|---|
| GRX | Released: 14 December 2023; Label: Universal Music Spain; Formats: LP, digital download, streaming | 2: PROMUSICAE: Gold | |

== Singles ==
=== As lead artist ===
List of singles as lead artist, showing selected chart positions, certifications, and associated albums
| Title | Year | Peak chart positions | | | | | | | | Certifications | Album |
| Title | Year | SPA | ARG | CHI | COL | CR | ECU | ITA | URU | Certifications | Album |
|---|---|---|---|---|---|---|---|---|---|---|---|
| "Ya No Quiero Ná" | 2018 | 3 | — | — | — | — | — | — | — | PROMUSICAE: 3× Platinum | Akelarre |
| "Borracha" (Remix) (with Yera and Juan Magán featuring De La Ghetto) | 2018 | — | — | — | — | — | — | — | — | | Non-album single |
| "Mujer Bruja" (with Mala Rodríguez) | 2018 | 6 | — | — | — | — | — | — | — | PROMUSICAE: 2× Platinum | Akelarre |
| "Maldición" (with Lalo Ebratt) | 2019 | 21 | — | — | 80 | — | — | — | — | PROMUSICAE: Platinum | Akelarre |
| "Me Quedo" (with Aitana) | 2019 | 6 | — | — | — | — | — | — | — | PROMUSICAE: 2× Platinum | Spoiler |
| "Lola Bunny" (with Don Patricio) | 2019 | 4 | — | — | — | — | — | — | — | PROMUSICAE: 2× Platinum | La Niña |
| "Autoestima" (Remix) (with Cupido featuring Alizzz) | 2019 | 61 | — | — | — | — | — | — | — | | Préstame un Sentimiento |
| "Luna" | 2019 | 64 | — | — | — | — | — | — | — | | Akelarre (Edición Especial) |
| "4 Besos" (with Rauw Alejandro and Lalo Ebratt) | 2020 | 7 | — | — | — | — | 50 | — | — | PROMUSICAE: 2× Platinum | La Niña |
| "Lento" (Remix) (with Boro Boro and MamboLosco) | 2020 | — | — | — | — | — | — | 80 | — | | Caldo |
| "Trendy" (with Rvfv) | 2020 | 9 | — | — | — | — | — | — | — | PROMUSICAE: Platinum | Non-album single |
| "Santería" (with Danna Paola and Denise Rosenthal) | 2020 | 15 | — | 10 | — | — | — | — | 15 | PROMUSICAE: Platinum | Akelarre (Edición Especial) |
| "High" (Remix) (with María Becerra and Tini) | 2020 | 62 | 2 | — | — | — | — | — | — | | Non-album single |
| "Cómo Te Va?" (with Beret) | 2020 | 17 | — | — | — | — | — | — | — | PROMUSICAE: Gold | La Niña |
| "La Tirita" (with Belén Aguilera) | 2020 | 32 | — | — | — | — | — | — | — | PROMUSICAE: Gold | Superpop |
| "Calle" (with Guaynaa and Cauty) | 2021 | 72 | — | — | — | — | — | — | — | | La Niña |
| "Demente" (with Denise Rosenthal) | 2021 | — | — | — | — | — | — | — | — | | Todas Somos Reinas |
| "Spice Girls" | 2021 | — | — | — | — | — | — | — | — | | La Niña |
| "Culo" (with Khea) | 2021 | 95 | — | — | — | — | — | — | — | | La Niña |
| "Chivirika" (Remix) (with El Villanord and Mariah Angeliq featuring Jon Z, Nesi and Yailin la Mas Viral) | 2021 | — | — | — | — | — | — | — | — | | Non-album single |
| "La Niña de la Escuela" (with Tini and Belinda) | 2021 | 9 | 37 | — | — | 20 | 8 | — | 11 | PROMUSICAE: 4× Platinum; CAPIF: Platinum | La Niña |
| "Romeo y Julieta" (with Rvfv) | 2021 | 71 | — | — | — | — | — | — | — | PROMUSICAE: Gold | Non-album singles |
| "Mañana" (with Álvaro De Luna) | 2021 | — | — | — | — | — | — | — | — | | Non-album singles |
| "Tamagochi" | 2022 | — | — | — | — | — | — | — | — | | La Niña |
| "Las Solteras" | 2022 | 83 | — | — | — | — | — | — | — | | El Dragón |
| "Toy Story" | 2022 | 75 | — | — | — | — | — | — | — | PROMUSICAE: Platinum | La Niña XXL |
| "Piketaison" (with Luna Ki) | 2022 | — | — | — | — | — | — | — | — | | Cl34n |
| "An1mal" | 2022 | 74 | — | — | — | — | — | — | — | PROMUSICAE: Gold | El Dragón |
| "Caramello" (with Rocco Hunt and Elettra Lamborghini) | 2022 | — | — | — | — | — | — | 3 | — | FIMI: Platinum | Rivoluzione |
| "Humedad" (Remix) (with Saiko and Alejo) | 2022 | — | — | — | — | — | — | — | — | | Non-album singles |
| "Antes Que Salga el Sol" (with FMK) | 2022 | — | — | — | — | — | — | — | — | | Non-album singles |
| "Discoteka" (with María Becerra) | 2022 | 43 | 24 | — | — | — | — | — | 16 | PROMUSICAE: Platinum; CAPIF: Gold | El Dragón |
| "Corazones Rotos" (with Luis Fonsi) | 2023 | 41 | — | 19 | — | — | — | — | — | PROMUSICAE: Platinum | El Dragón |
| "Tiki Tiki" (with Ptazeta) | 2023 | 100 | — | — | — | — | — | — | — | | Gorgona |
| "La Santa" | 2023 | 32 | — | — | — | — | — | — | — | PROMUSICAE: Platinum | El Dragón |
| "El Tonto" (with Quevedo) | 2023 | 1 | 87 | — | — | — | — | — | — | PROMUSICAE: 7× Platinum | El Dragón |
| "Turismo" (with Sael) | 2023 | — | — | — | — | — | — | — | — | | El Dragón |
| "Mala Suerte" (with Dellafuente) | 2023 | 30 | — | — | — | — | — | — | — | PROMUSICAE: Gold | TBA |
| "De Plastilina" (with Pepe y Vizio) | 2023 | 51 | — | — | — | — | — | — | — | PROMUSICAE: Gold | TBA |
| "Yo Tengo un Novio" (with La Zowi) | 2023 | 17 | — | — | — | — | — | — | — | PROMUSICAE: Gold | GRX |
| "Casanova" (with Soolking & RVFV) | 2024 | 2 | — | — | — | — | — | — | — | PROMUSICAE: 3× Platinum | Non-album single |
| "Una Bachata" (with Saiko) | 2024 | 9 | — | — | — | — | — | — | — | PROMUSICAE: Platinum | GRX |
| "1000 Cosas" (with Manuel Turizo) | 2024 | 2 | — | — | — | — | — | — | — | PROMUSICAE: 4× Platinum | Nave Dragón |
| "El Pantalón" (with Omar Montes & Las Chuches) | 2024 | 3 | — | — | — | — | — | — | — | PROMUSICAE: Platinum | Lágrimas de Un Maleante |
| "La Reina" (solo or remix with María Becerra and Villano Antillano) | 2024 | 4 | 60 | — | — | — | — | — | — | PROMUSICAE: 4× Platinum | Nave Dragón |
| "Kombolewa" (with Suzete) | 2024 | 56 | — | — | — | — | — | — | — | | Non-album singles |
| "Pesadillas" | 2024 | 56 | — | — | — | — | — | — | — | | Nave Dragón |
| "Perreito Pa Llorar" (with Paulo Londra) | 2024 | 19 | — | — | — | — | — | — | — | PROMUSICAE: Gold | Nave Dragón |
| "Sin Autotune" | 2025 | 20 | — | — | — | — | — | — | — | | Nave Dragón |
| "Moja1ta" | 2025 | 18 | — | — | — | — | — | — | — | | Nave Dragón |
| "Pa Ti Toa" (with Ana Mena) | 2026 | 3 | — | — | — | — | — | — | — | * PROMUSICAE: Platinum | |
"—" denotes a recording that did not chart or was not released in that territory.

=== As featured artist ===
List of singles as a featured artist, showing year released and album name
| Title | Year | Peaks | | Album |
| Title | Year | ARG | URU | Album |
|---|---|---|---|---|
| "M.A" (Remix) (BM, Callejero Fino and La Joaqui featuring Lola Índigo) | 2023 | 1 | 4 | Non-album single |

=== Promotional singles ===
List of promotional singles with chart positions, showing year released and album name
| Title | Year | Peaks | Album |
| Title | Year | SPA | Album |
|---|---|---|---|
| "El Mundo Entero" (with Agoney, Ana Guerra, Raoul and Aitana featuring Maikel Delacalle) | 2018 | — | Non-album promotional single |
| "Fuerte" | 2019 | 48 | Akelarre |
| "El Humo" (Note: "El Humo" was released as a standalone single for the movie Lo Dejo Cuando Quiera.) | 2019 | 58 | Akelarre |
| "Sensación de Vivir" (with Morat, Natalia Lacunza and Lalo Ebratt | 2019 | — | Non-album promotional single |
| "Game Over" | 2020 | — | Akelarre |
| "Mala Cara" | 2020 | 97 | La Niña |
| "ABC" | 2022 | — | La Niña XXL |
| "Spinelli" | 2022 | — | La Niña XXL |
| "Q Somos?" (with Kidd Voodoo) | 2025 | — | Nave Dragón |

== Other charted songs ==
List of other charted songs, showing year released and album name
| Title | Year | Peaks | Certifications | Album |
| Title | Year | SPA | Certifications | Album |
|---|---|---|---|---|
| "Subliminal" (with Maikel Delacalle and the Rudeboyz) | 2019 | 75 | Akelarre | |
| "El Condenao" (with Maka) | 2023 | 28: PROMUSICAE: Platinum | GRX | |
| "Verde" | 2025 | 87 | Non-album promotional single | |

== Guest appearances ==
List of guest appearances showing year released and album name
| Title | Year | Other artist(s) | Album |
|---|---|---|---|
| "Don't You Worry 'bout a Thing" | 2017 | Ana Guerra | OT Gala 1 (Operación Triunfo 2017) |
| "A-Yo" | 2017 | —N/a | OT Gala 2 (Operación Triunfo 2017) |
| "Camina" | 2017 | Operación Triunfo 2017 | Operación Triunfo 2017 (Duetos) |
| "Lady Marmalade" | 2017 | Gisela, Verónica Romero and Ana Guerra | Operación Triunfo 2017 (Duetos) |
| "Problema" | 2020 | Mala Rodríguez | Mala |
| "Respira" | 2021 | Guaynaa | La República |
| "Se Pega" | 2022 | Maffio | Eso es Mental |
| "Se Luce" | 2022 | Rafa Pabön | Dial Up |
