= La Niña (album) =

Studio album by Lola Índigo
- Released: July 2, 2021
- Recorded: 2019–2021
- Length: 48:42
- Language: Spanish
- Label: Universal Music Spain
- Producers: Aeme; Alizzz; Algama; Roy Borland; Caleb Calloway; Casta; Andy Clay; Los Danielz; Dark Lion; Diogo Guerra; Ily Wonder; Mango; Nabález; Noize; Pablo Rouss; Luis Salazar; Redmojo; Stygo; Sunmy

Lola Índigo chronology
| Akelarre (2019) | La Niña (2021) | El Dragón (2023) |

Singles from La Niña
- 1. "Lola Bunny" Released: July 30, 2019; 2. "4 Besos" Released: March 27, 2020; 3. "Cómo te Va?" Released: October 30, 2020; 4. "Calle" Released: April 1, 2021; 5. "Spice Girls" Released: May 14, 2021; 6. "Culo" Released: June 17, 2021; 7. "La Niña de la Escuela" Released: July 2, 2021; 8. "Tamagochi" Released: January 18, 2022

La Niña is the second studio album by Spanish singer Lola Indigo. It was released on July 2, 2021, through Universal Music Spain. Its expected release is preceded by three singles: "Cómo te Va?" featuring Spanish singer Beret, "Calle" featuring Puerto Rican rappers Guaynaa and Cauty and the solo release "Spice Girls". Other vocal collaborations include Tini, Belinda, Khea, Mala Rodríguez, Lyanno and Roy Borland. In the deluxe edition of the album, which includes the top ten singles "4 Besos" and "Lola Bunny", Rauw Alejandro, Lalo Ebratt and Don Patricio also appear as vocal collaborators. The aesthetic of the album revolves around pink and bubblegum culture, mainly inspired in fashion dolls.

== Background ==
During 2020 Indigo stated that she was working on her next record. During that year she released quite a few singles. In March, "4 Besos", featuring Rauw Alejandro and Lalo Ebratt, became a top ten hit in Spain and also entered the charts in Ecuador. In June, she released the promotional single "Mala Cara", which she premiered at the final episode of Operación Triunfo. Later, she teamed up with Danna Paola and Denise Rosenthal for "Santería", which was well received by both the press and the public, becoming a top twenty hit in Spain, Uruguay and Chile and also entering the charts in Mexico. In October, Indigo collaborated by Spanish singer and rapper Beret on "Cómo te Va?", which was certified Gold in her home country and was accompanied by a music video starring actor Miguel Herrán. The year later, Indigo released "Calle" featuring Puerto Rican rappers Guaynaa and Cauty and spawned the solo release "Spice Girls".

During the first months of 2021, Indigo teased the album to be called "La Niña" and released a temptative cover on May 6. Both the tracklist and release date were revealed through social media on June 4 meanwhile the final and definitive cover was released a week later alongside the pre-order. The cover art, designed, produced and portrayed by design studio Super Fuerte, received positive reviews.

== Track listing ==
La Niña track listing
| No. | Title | Writer(s) | Producer(s) | Length |
|---|---|---|---|---|
| 1. | "La Niña de la Escuela" (with Tini and Belinda) | Andy Clay; Belinda Peregrín Schüll; Joey Montana; Luis Salazar; Martina Stoessel; Miriam Doblas Muñoz | Clay; Salazar | 3:24 |
| 2. | "Culo" (with Khea) | Chris Zadley; Ivo Alfredo Thomas Serue; Jose Daniel Zapata Aspirilla; Juan Esteban Zapata Aspirilla; Doblas Muñoz | Los Danielz | 3:51 |
| 3. | "Tamagochi" | Gerson Stiven Cuesta Hoyos; Doblas Muñoz; Natalia Afanador; Valentina Rico | Sunamy | 2:46 |
| 4. | "Spice Girls" | Mango; Doblas Muñoz; Nabález | Mango; Nabález | 3:30 |
| 5. | "Nada a Nadie" (with Mala Rodríguez) | Caleb Calloway; María Rodríquez Garrido; Doblas Muñoz; Omar Koonze; Pablo Rousselon; Rico | Pablo Rouss; Calloway | 3:02 |
| 6. | "Calle" (with Guaynaa and Cauty) | Christian Camarena López; Christian Daniel Mojica Blanco; Eva Ibañez Fraile; Felipe Gonzalez Abad; Germán Gonzalo Duque Molano; Héctor Caleb López Jiménez; Jean Carlos Santiago Perez; Doblas Muñoz; Piero Visciotti | Calloway | 3:42 |
| 7. | "Killa (Ring Ring)" | Luis Miguel Gómez Cataño; Mango; Doblas Muñoz; Nabález | Mango; Nabález; Casta | 3:32 |
| 8. | "Cómo te Va?" (with Beret) | Francisco Javier Álvarez Beret; Jose Diogo Guerra; Doblas Muñoz; Tyoz | Guerra; Redmojo | 3:37 |
| 9. | "Mala Cara" | Christian Sera Bértolo; Cristian Quirante Catalán; Doblas Muñoz | Alizzz | 2:48 |
| 10. | "Tú y Yo" | Daniel Luis Rodríguez; Matt Hunter; Doblas Muñoz | Noize | 2:43 |
| 11. | "La Llorera" | Doblas Muñoz; Rousselon | Rouss | 2:34 |
| 12. | "Cash" (with Lyanno) | Mauricio Acosta Echeverri; Andrés Uribe Marín; Edgardo Cuevas Feliciano; Santiago Múnera Penagos | Ily Wonder; Dark Lion; Aeme | 3:49 |
| 13. | "No se que decir" (with Roy Borland) | Doblas Muñoz; Rousselon; Roy Borland López | Borland; Rouss | 2:19 |
| 14. | "4 Besos" (with Lalo Ebratt and Rauw Alejandro) | Zadley; Doblas Muñoz; David Esteban Murillo Rodriguez; Eduardo Mario Ebratt Troncoso; Ibañez Fraile; Gonzalez Abad; Germán Gonzalo Duque Molano; Doblas Muñoz; Raúl Alejandro Ocasio Peña | Mango; Nabález; Algama | 3:51 |
| 15. | "Lola Bunny" (with Don Patricio) | Mateus Maghalhaes de Seabra; Doblas Muñoz; Patricio Martín Díaz; Rodrigo Silvério do Carmo | Stygo | 3:07 |
| Total length: | | | | 48:32 |

== Charts ==
=== Weekly charts ===
Weekly chart performance of La Niña
| Chart (2021) | Peak position |
|---|---|
| Spanish Albums (Promusicae) | 1 |

=== Year-end charts ===
Year-end chart performance for La Niña
| Chart (2021) | Position |
|---|---|
| Spanish Albums (PROMUSICAE) | 41 |
