= GRX =

GRX may refer to:

== Science and technology ==
- Glutaredoxin, a family of enzymes
- GPRS Roaming Exchange, in mobile telephony
- Shimano GRX groupsets, bicycle components for gravel riding

== Other uses ==
- Federico García Lorca Airport, Granada, Spain (IATA:GRX)
- Guriaso language, spoken on New Guineau (ISO 639-3:grx)
- Martin Garrix (born 1996), Dutch DJ and record producer
- GRX, a 2023 EP by Lola Índigo
- GRX, a fictional car in the Speed Racer franchise
