= Lola Índigo =

Spanish singer, songwriter and dancer

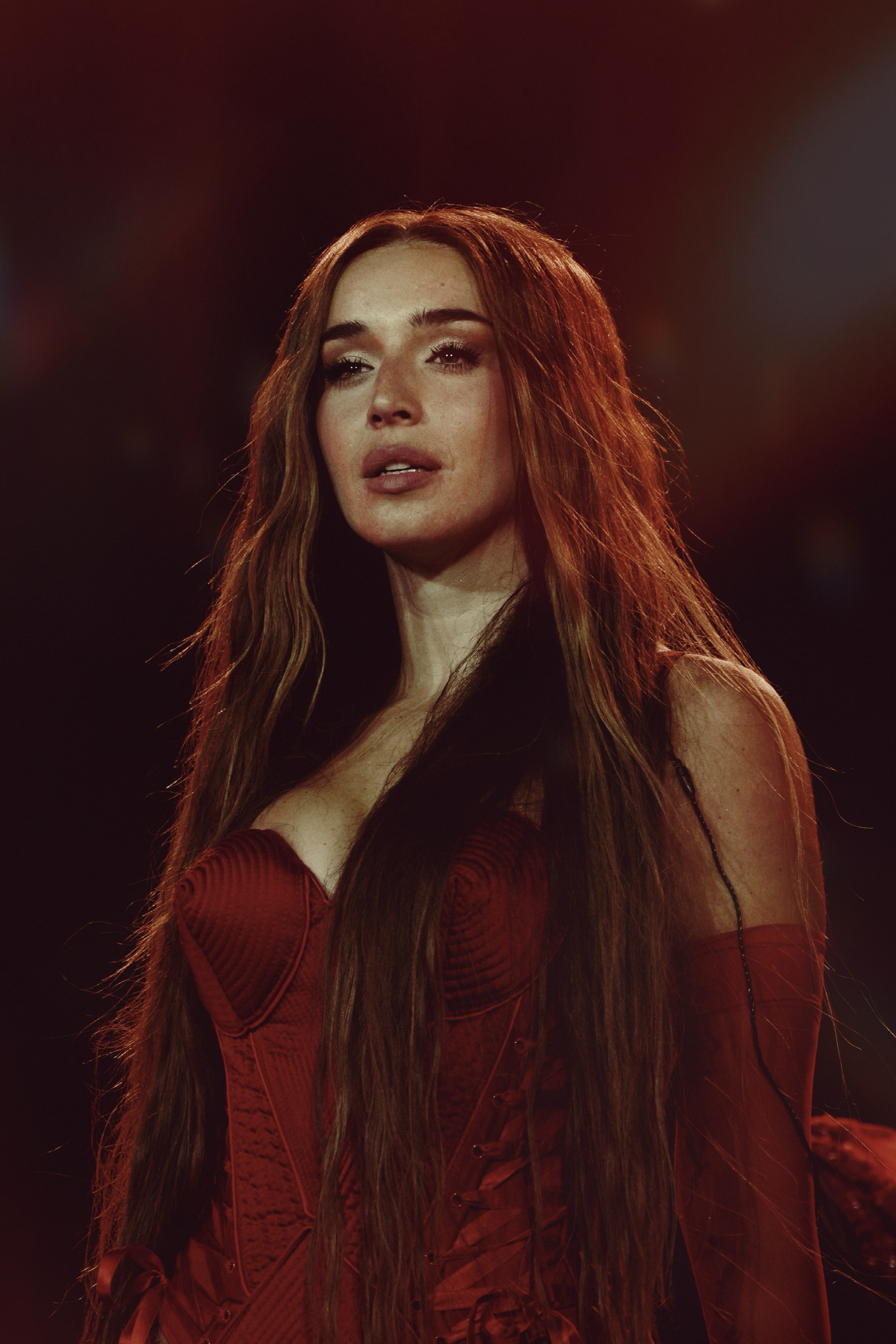
- Lola Índigo at her stadium tour in 2025

Background information
- Also known as: Mimi
- Born: Miriam Doblas Muñoz; 1 April 1992 (age 34); Madrid, Spain
- Origin: Huétor-Tájar, Granada, Spain
- Genres: Latin pop; reggaeton; electropop
- Occupations: Singer; songwriter; dancer
- Years active: 2017–present
- Label: Universal Music Spain

Miriam Doblas Muñoz (born 1 April 1992), known professionally as Lola Índigo, is a Spanish singer and dancer. She rose to fame in 2017, when she participated in series nine of the Spanish reality television talent competition Operación Triunfo. She was the first participant to be eliminated from the talent show. After exiting the show, the singer signed with Universal Music and released her debut single "Ya No Quiero Ná" which turned into a smash-hit in Spain, peaking at number three on the PROMUSICAE musical chart and selling more than a hundred thousand copies. It was certified as three times platinum. Her short but intense musical career has earned her multiple awards such as an MTV Europe Music Award for Best Spanish Act in 2019 and in 2024.

== Early life ==
Doblas was born in April 1992 in Madrid but was raised in Andalusia in Huétor-Tajar, a small town in the province of Granada. She became interested in fine arts at an early age, highlighting her facet as dancer and choreographer. She worked as a dance teacher and took part in some musicals. In 2010 she entered the Spanish dance television competition Fama Revolution where she was the fourth to leave. Later on, she was also the back-up dancer for A-list artists like Chris Brown, Miguel Bosé, Enrique Iglesias, Marta Sánchez, The Baseballs and more outside Spain, most concretely in China, where she lived for three years, and in Los Angeles, where she took singing classes and undertook more professional training.

In July 2017 she auditioned for Operación Triunfo, a music talent television contest that aired on La 1 after a six-year hiatus. The show began in October 2017 and became a media phenomenon in Spain. Its YouTube channel received over 561 million views from October to February 2018 and became the most commented space on Twitter in Spain surpassing Game of Thrones. After it ended, some of the contestants became instant national celebrities.

== Career ==
=== 2017–2018: Operación Triunfo ===
In October 2017, the singer entered musical reality show contest Operación Triunfo. She left on the third week, coming sixteenth. After she left the contest, she did some concerts in Barcelona and Madrid, where she also played music as an amateur disc jockey. In January 2018 she performed in her first official concert at the Sala Prince in Granada which sold-out. She sang OT2017's hymn "Camina" at the 2018 Premios Forqué in Zaragoza, a professional film and television awards, alongside her fellow competitors. Universal Music offered Doblas to form a musical group with three other OT competitors that was meant to be named "Delta", which she declined after no songs worked for this project. Doblas co-headlined a 23-date arena concert tour with her fifteen companions from the talent show from March to December 2018. The tour, named OT 2017, (en concierto) was attended by over 300,000 people and visited Spain's largest indoor arenas and stadiums like the Palau Sant Jordi and the Santiago Bernabéu Stadium. In September 2018 she took part in a television competition of celebrity impersonations Tu Cara Me Suena, where she came fourth. In December she sang the Coca-Cola's Christmas campaign jingle "El Mundo Entero" alongside Aitana, Ana Guerra, Raoul Vázquez and Agoney.

=== 2018–2019: Breakthrough with Akelarre ===
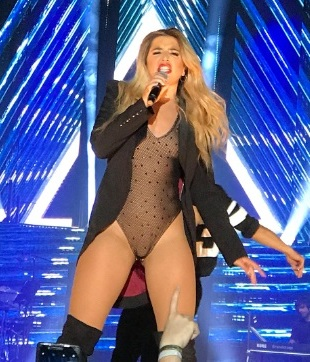
Doblas performing in 2018

In June 2018, Doblas announced her stage name "Lola Índigo". Lola Índigo, however, was first announced as a supergroup formed by Doblas and four dancers: Mónica Peña, Saydi Lubanzadio, Laura Ruiz y Claudia Riera. This band would mix singing and dancing with a mix of trap, reggueton and funk. On 20 July 2018, she released her debut single "Ya No Quiero Ná" through Universal Music. The song, produced by Belgian musician Bruno Valverde in Segovia, became an instant hit in Spain thanks to its contagious rhythm and feminist lyrics. It debuted at number three on the PROMUSICAE chart, with this being its peak position. The music video for "Ya No Quiero Ná" had a very low budget; was filmed at the Juan Carlos I park in Madrid with an urban and very careful aesthetic in which dance is the protagonist. It received over a million views in one day. As of April 2020, the song has been certified three times platinum. Universal Music expanded her single contract in order to release her debut studio album. In November 2018 she embarked on her first solo tour called "Índigo Tour" which began on 3 November in Granada and ended on 23 March 2019, in Toledo comprising 17 of concerts in total.

Thus, throughout 2018 she started shaping her debut studio album. In December she released her second single "Mujer Bruja" which features Mala Rodríguez. The track peaked at number six in Spain. There she announced that her album would have a "witch theme". That same month she collaborated with multiple artists on the remix of Yera's "Borracha" and also released the "Ya No Quiero Ná" remix featuring Joey Montana and Charly Black. In the beginning of 2019 she collaborated with Movistar+ and dance television competition Fama a Bailar and sang the theme song "Fuerte" for the show's 2019 edition. She also worked there as a regular coach and performed a couple times. In April she collaborated with Mediaset and sang the main song for the 2019 film Lo Dejo Cuando Quiera, which turned to be "El Humo". These two songs were both released as promotional singles of her debut album. Later that month, she released "Maldición" featuring Colombian rapper Lalo Ebratt. On 17 May 2019, her album Akelarre (Basque for "witches' sabbath") was released after multiple delays. It debuted at the top position of the Spanish charts. Its respective tour began on 4 May at the FIBES Conference Center in Seville and ended on 30 November in Girona comprising 33 concerts.

In June she collaborated with Aitana on her song "Me Quedo" which was released as a single on 28 June. On 31 July 2019, Índigo released "Lola Bunny", a non-album track that features Spanish novel rapper and actual boyfriend Don Patricio. Its upbeat rhythm and fast urban sound earned the song the fourth position on the PROMUSICAE chart. On 8 August she collaborated with Cupido on the remix of their song "Autoestima" which was constantly played by the MTV. In October 2019 she opened two concerts for Colombian megastar Sebastián Yatra in Ecuador and did a showcase in Bogotá. On 6 December she closed the 'Akelarre' era with a new song, "Luna". Lola Índigo will play her first solo arena concert on 29 November 2020 at the WiZink Center in Madrid. The show, titled 'Akelarre: la Noche de las Brujas' was scheduled to take place on 2 May but was delayed due to the ongoing coronavirus pandemic.

=== 2020–2021: La Niña ===
On 27 March 2020, Índigo released "4 Besos" featuring Rauw Alejandro and Lalo Ebratt, the lead single of her second album which is scheduled to be released in late 2020. In May a second collaboration with Mala Rodríguez titled "Problema" was released as a track on Rodríguez's sixth studio album Mala. On 10 June, the promotional single "Mala Cara" was released on streaming media and performed on the final gala of Operación Triunfo 2020. During summer season, Indigo released different collaborations. In July she united with Spanish urban singer Rvfv on "Trendy", which had its own challenge on TikTok and worked well on the charts. On 28 August her highly anticipated collaboration with Mexican and Chilean singers Danna Paola and Denise Rosenthal titled "Santería" was released online, peaking at 15 on the PROMUSICAE chart and became a top twenty hit in Chile. In September, Indigo entered the Billboard Argentina Hot 100 chart for the first time after releasing "High (Remix)" alongside Argentine singers María Becerra and Tini. The track was named "Best Latin Summer Remix of 2020" by Billboard and scored a Premios Gardel nomination for Best Trap/Urban Song or Album. A month later she collaborated with Spanish rapper Beret on "Cómo te Va?" and in November with Belén Aguilera in "La Tirita". In July 2021, she released the song "La Niña de la Escuela" with Tini and Belinda, which was born right after the quarantine and created via Zoom reaching the third position in Spanish iTunes charts. In August, she did an interview alongside Belinda with the fashion magazine Vanity Teen in which they both talked about the ways music changed their lives, how they faced difficult times while growing up, the joy of helping others and their latest international hit single "La Niña de la Escuela".

=== 2022–present: El Dragón and La Voz Kids & La Voz coach ===
On 17 February 2022, Índigo released "Las Solteras" alongside a music video. Two months later, the double single "Toy Story" and "ABC" was released on 8 April, featured on the expanded edition of La Niña, titled La Niña XXL. On 3 June, she released "An1mal" as the lead single from her third studio album. Another single, "Discoteka" with María Becerra was released on 26 August. The album El Dragón was announced in early November with no release date or album cover. Two concert dates in Madrid and Barcelona were announced for 6 and 13 May. More tour dates were added through the months, including five dates across South America. "Corazones Rotos" alongside Luis Fonsi was released on 6 January 2023. The album was officially announced in March. The single "La Santa" was released on 17 March. The album was released on 14 April featuring the single "El Tonto" with Quevedo. In 2024, she became a coach on the ninth season of La Voz Kids alongside David Bisbal, Rosario Flores, and Melendi. She returned for her second season in 2025. Índigo debuted as a coach on the thirteenth season of La Voz in the latter half of 2026.

== Personal life ==
Since 2025, she has been in a relationship with streamer and YouTuber IlloJuan.

== Discography ==
- Akelarre (2019)
- La Niña (2021)
- El Dragón (2023)
- Nave Dragón (2025)
- La Bruja, La Niña y El Dragón (2026)

== Tours ==
Headlining

- Akelarre Tour (2019–2020)
- La Niña Tour (2021–2022)
- El Dragón Tour (2023-2025)
- Nave Dragón Tour (2025)
- La Bruja, La Niña y El Dragón (2025)
- Romance de 1 Noche de Verano (2026)

Co-headlining

- Operación Triunfo 2017 en Concierto (2017–2018)

== Filmography ==
=== Voice acting ===
==== Film ====
Year	Title	Role	Publisher	Ref.
2021	Space Jam: A New Legacy	Lola Bunny	Spain's Spanish dub	
2022	Lola Indigo: La Niña	Herself	Documentary for Prime Video	
2024	Lola Indigo: GRX	Herself	Documentary for Movistar+	
2026	Lola Indigo: La Bruja, La Niña y El Dragón	Herself	Documentary for RTVE	

== Awards and nominations ==
Year	Organization	Category	Nominee/work	Result	Ref.
2019	Premios Yudeo	Best Solo Recording	"Ya No Quiero Ná"	Won	
2019	LOS40 Music Awards	New Artist of the Year	Herself	Won	
2019	LOS40 Music Awards	Video of the Year	"Me Quedo"	Nominated	
2019	MTV Europe Music Awards	Best Spanish Act	Herself	Won	
2019	Urban Music Awards by Los 40 Colombia	Best New Artist	Herself	Nominated	
2020	Premios Odeón	Best New Artist	Herself	Nominated	
2021	Gardel Awards	Best Urban/Trap Song or Album	"High (Remix)" (with María Becerra and Tini)	Nominated	
2022	LOS40 Music Awards	Best artist or group	Herself	Nominated	
2022	LOS40 Music Awards	Best live artist or group	Herself	Won	
2022	LOS40 Music Awards	Best artist or group "From 40 to 1"	Herself	Nominated	
2026	Billboard Latin Women in Music	Artistic Evolution Award	Herself	Won	
2026	Heat Latin Music Awards	Best Collaboration	"Pa ti toa" (with Ana Mena)	Pending	
2026	Heat Latin Music Awards	Best Collaboration	"El Bachatón de la L" (with Lucho RK)	Pending	
2026	LOS40 Music Awards	Best Act	Herself	Pending	
2026	LOS40 Music Awards	Best Song	"Pa ti toa" (with Ana Mena)	Pending	
2026	LOS40 Music Awards	Best Collaboration	"Pa ti toa" (with Ana Mena)	Pending	
2026	LOS40 Music Awards	Best Collaboration	"El Bachatón de la L" (with Lucho RK)	Pending	
