= Charlotte Summers =

Spanish singer (born 2005)

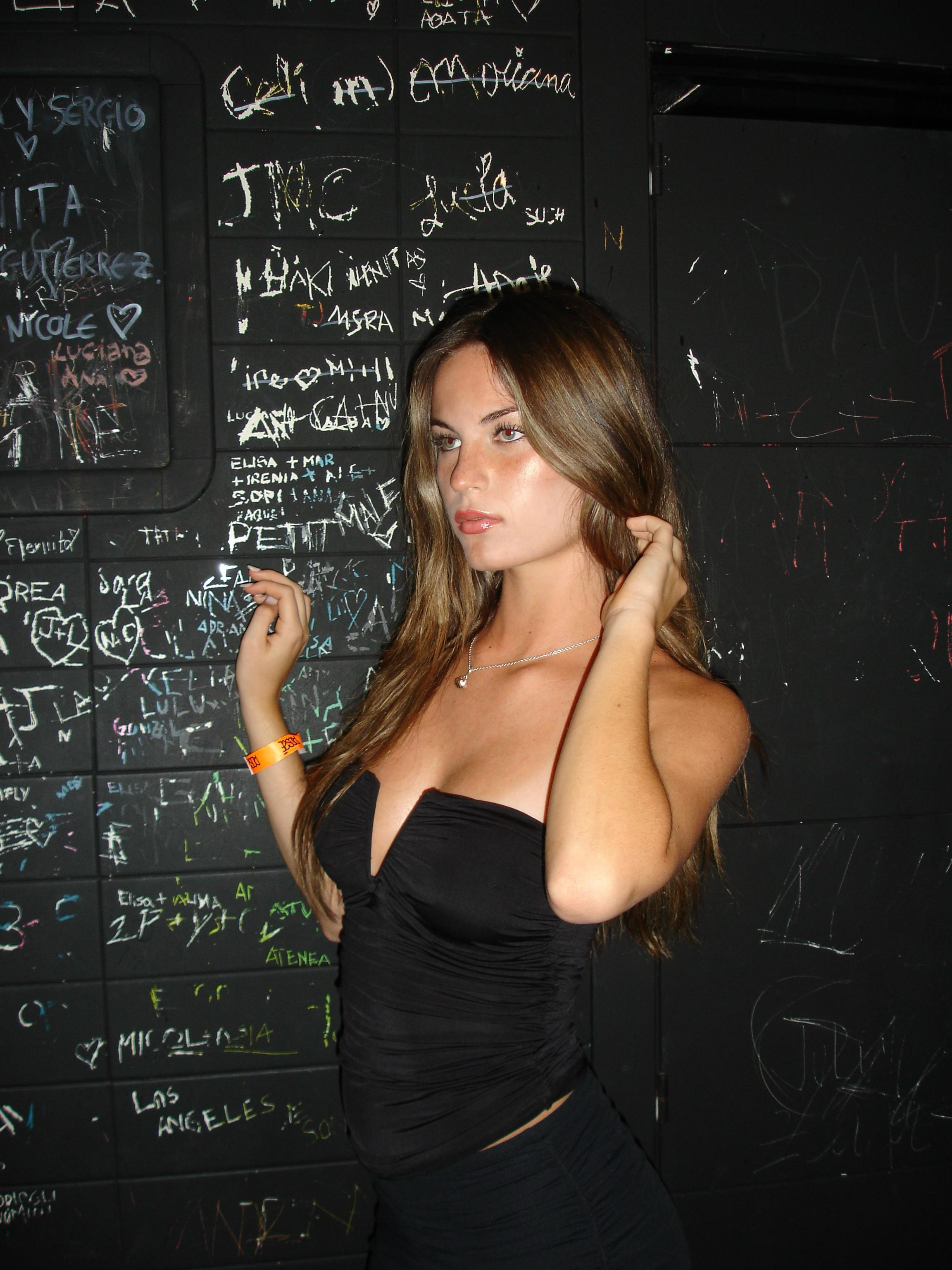
- Summers in 2025
- Born: 15 November 2005 (age 20); Marbella, Spain
- Occupations: Singer, dancer, model
- Website: charlottesummers.com

Charlotte Summers (born 15 November 2005) is a Spanish singer and dancer. Originally from Marbella, Spain, she made her first stage appearance as the young Eponine, and a street girl, in Les Misérables, at the age of eight. A year later, she competed in the talent show series La Voz Kids. At the age of ten, she was the runner up in the second season of Fenómeno Fan, and the winner of the Big Talent Competition, Malaga.

She won Best Original Song at the Eurokids International Festival, Italy, in 2017, with her song Unicorn. In 2018, she travelled to the United States. She appeared on NBC's Little Big Shots with Steve Harvey. During her first appearance she sang "It's a Man's Man's Man's World" by James Brown, and sang the Eagle's classic, "Please Come Home for Christmas" on the Little Big Shot's Christmas Special. At age 13 in 2019 she appeared on America's Got Talent (season 14). She also made regular appearances singing on the Spanish TV show "Menudo Noche". Before appearing on AGT in 2019 she also appeared in a Japanese talent Show, Best of Number Ones. In 2026, Summers appeared on the thirteenth season of La Voz.

== Career ==
=== 2014: Les Miserables ===
Charlotte won the role of young Eponine ahead of 100 hopefuls and appeared on stage at the Teatro Cervantes, Malaga.

=== 2015: La Voz Kids (2nd Edition) ===
Charlotte sang the blind audition song "I dreamed a dream" from Les Misérables and chose to go with Rosario Flores as her coach.

=== 2015 : Fenomeno Fan ===
Opening with "One Night Only" by Jennifer Hudson. Charlotte then made it through a number of rounds singin songs including " Let it Go" from Frozen, "Hallelujah", "If I were a Boy" by Beyonce and "We are Young" by Fun. She finished as runner up.

=== 2017: Little Big Shots (aired 2018) ===
When she was 11 years old, she appeared on Little Big Shots twice:

- April 2018 where she sat for an interview with Steve Harvey and then sang "It's a Man's Man's Man's World".
- December 2018 where she sat for an interview with Steve Harvey and then she sang "Please Come Home For Christmas"

=== 2017–2019: Menudo Noche ===
Hosted by Juan Y Medio, Charlotte was a regular guest on this regional TV programme singing well known songs.

=== 2019: Best of Number 1s (Japan) ===
In December 2018, Charlotte was invited to appear on a popular Japanese TV show, and was flown out to Tokyo to participate in a competition featuring 6 of the best child singers in Japan and the rest of the World. The Show was aired on January 1st 2019. Charlotte was hailed as the winner after singing " New York, New York" and " I was born to love you" by Freddie Mercury.

=== 2019: America's Got Talent (AGT) ===
Summers appeared on America's Got Talent Season 14 (2019) 3 times at age 13.

==== Audition ====
In the first round, she received a standing ovation from the audience and all 4 judges for her rendition of Screamin' Jay Hawkins' "I Put a Spell on You".

==== Judge Cuts ====
For the judge cuts Charlotte performed her own rendition of "You Don't Own Me" recorded by Lesley Gore in 1963. Her performance received a standing ovation from the audience, the 4 judges, and the guest judge Jay Leno, and they advanced her to the quarterfinals.

==== Quarterfinals ====
Her quarterfinals performance consisted of singing Shirley Bassey's "Diamonds Are Forever" from the James Bond film of the same name. Due to her placement in America's Vote, the number of votes she received in the Dunkin' Save and the judges voting, she was forced into a tiebreaker where she was eventually eliminated from the competition.

=== 2026: La Voz (13th Edition) ===
In 2026, eleven years after her La Voz Kids audition, Summers auditioned for the thirteenth season of La Voz. In her audition she sang "Million Years Ago" by Adele. All four of the show's coaches (Mika, Pablo López, Lola Índigo, and Melendi) expressed interest in working with her. Summers was defaulted to Índigo's team after Índigo used a "megablock" on her.

== Stage performances ==
Year	Event
2026	La Voz – Season 13
2019	AGT – Season 14
2018	NBC's Little Big Shots
2017–2019	Menudo Noche (Spanish TV show)
2015	La Voz Kids – Season 2
