= Santeria (disambiguation) =

Santería is an Afro-Caribbean religion that developed in Cuba during the late 19th century.

Santeria may also refer to:

- "Santeria" (song), a 1996 song by Sublime
- Santeria (album), a 2016 album by Marracash and Guè Pequeno
- "Santeria" (Pusha T song), 2018
- "Santería" (Lola Índigo, Danna Paola and Denise Rosenthal song), 2020

== See also ==
- Santeros de Aguada, a Puerto Rican basketball team
- Santerians, a Marvel Comics superhero team
