= Alevosía =

Studio album by La Mala Rodriguez
- Released: November 3, 2003
- Genre: R&B, hip hop
- Length: 59:06
- Label: Universal Music Group
- Producer: Supernafamacho

La Mala Rodriguez chronology
Lujo Ibérico (2000)	Alevosía (2003)	Malamarismo (2007)

Singles from Alevosía
- 1. "La Niña"; 2. "Lo Fácil Cae Ligero"; 3. "Jugadoras Jugadores"; 4. "Amor y Respeto"

Alevosía is the second studio album by Spanish hip hop singer La Mala Rodriguez, released on November 3, 2003 and was recorded in Madrid and mixed in New York City. "La Niña" was the first single from the album.

The album was produced by Supernafamacho and Jotamayúscula which had worked before with La Mala Rodríguez. This album included numerous collaborations included Mr. T-Cee and Raimundo Amador. 69/5000 This album was certified as gold after selling more than 50,000 copies.

== Reception ==
The AllMusic review by Jason Birchmeier awarded the album 3 stars stating "As a rapper, Rodríguez has noticeably matured in the three years since Lujo Ibérico, sounding more confident and laid-back in her delivery and coming up with darker rhymes that are more streetwise and far more hardcore than last time. If anything, the critical acclaim of Lujo Ibérico seems to have hardened Rodríguez and turned her away from the commercial mainstream. Take for instance the lead single "La Niña," a grim song about a young girl who grows up on the margins of society in a barrio filled with drugs, crime, and shattered dreams. Fodder for the pop charts it's not. Unfortunately, Rodríguez is joined by a long list of featured guests on Alevosía. Eight of the 14 tracks feature one or more guests, a Spanish hardcore rap rogue's gallery that most notably includes Giggi Montecquiggia, Kultama, and Kamikaze. These guest rappers, most of them obscure and all of them inferior to Rodríguez, tarnish Alevosía greatly. If not for the onslaught of guest features, Alevosía would be a first-rate album. Rodríguez's raps are peerless, and the production work of Mayúscula, Supernafamacho, and Sr. Tcee is spellbinding. If you can overlook the guest features, there are a lot of highlights besides "La Niña," among them "Lo Fácil Cae Ligero," "En la Hoguera," "Jugadoras, Jugadores," and "Una Raya en el Agua," the latter notable for its touches of flamenco. ".

Professional ratings
Review scores
Source	Rating
AllMusic	3/5 stars

== Track listing ==
All tracks by La Mala Rodriguez except where noted.

1. "Fácil Cae Ligero" – 5:39
2. "En la Hoguera" – 4:08
3. "Jugadoras, Jugadores" – 5:41
4. "Como el Ruido del Mar" (Juan Carlos Alonso Suarez) – 1:07
5. "Una Raya en el Agua" – 3:34
6. "Vengo Prepará" (Elias Lopez, Rodriguez, Supernafamacho) – 4:02
7. "La Niña" – 4:36
8. "Mamoneo" (Kultama, Rodriguez) – 4:34
9. "En Esto" – 2:13
10. "Sobresalientes" (Rodriguez, Miguel Angel Soler) – 5:02
11. "Grita Fuego" (Rachid Bagasse, Rodriguez) – 4:06
12. "Fuerza" – 2:51
13. "Alevosía" (Aqeel Anthony, Rodriguez) – 6:23
14. "Amor y Respeto" – 5:10
15. "La Niña" [Video] –

== Personnel ==
- Sergio Aguilar Pereira – executive producer
- Raimundo Amador – guitar
- Tony Campana – percussion assistant
- Ivius – graphic design
- Killer B – mixing
- Leo Swift Morris – engineer
- Mala Rodríguez – vocals
- Duncan Stanbury – mastering engineer
- Supernafamacho – mixing, recording
