= La Voz (Spanish TV series) season 13 =

La Voz
- Season 13
- Promotional poster featuring coaches Melendi, Índigo, Mika, and López
- Hosted by: Eva González
- Coaches: Mika; Pablo López; Lola Índigo; Melendi; Vanesa Martín (second chance)

Release
- Original network: Antena 3
- Original release: 18 September 2026 – present

Season chronology
- ← Previous; Season 12

The thirteenth season of La Voz began airing on 18 September 2026 on Antena 3. Pablo López and Mika both returned from the previous season as coaches, marking their eighth and second seasons, respectively. Former coach Melendi returned after an eight-season hiatus, marking his third season. Former La Voz Kids coach Lola Índigo debuted on the panel this season. This season introduces a "fifth coach", former La Voz Kids coach Vanesa Martín, who gave select artists a second chance after previously being eliminated. Eva González returned as host for her eighth consecutive season.

== Panelists ==
=== Coaches & Host ===
La Voz Season 13 Coaches and host

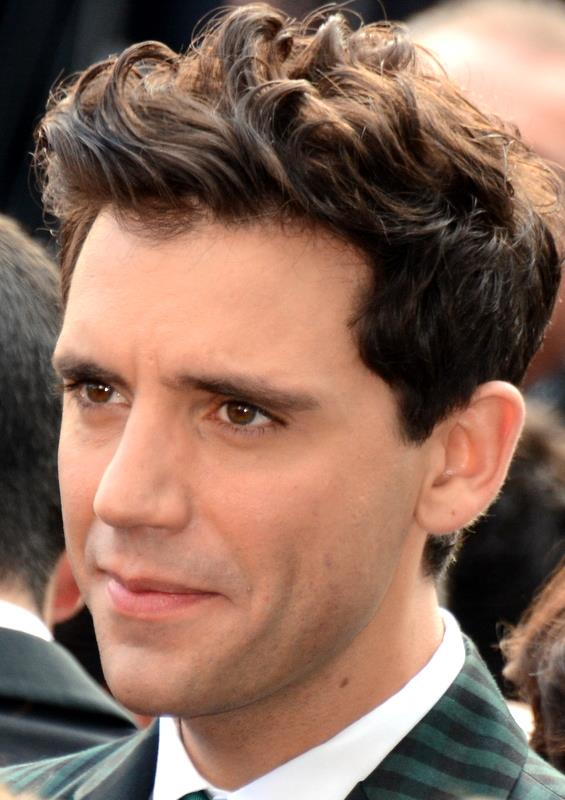
Mika

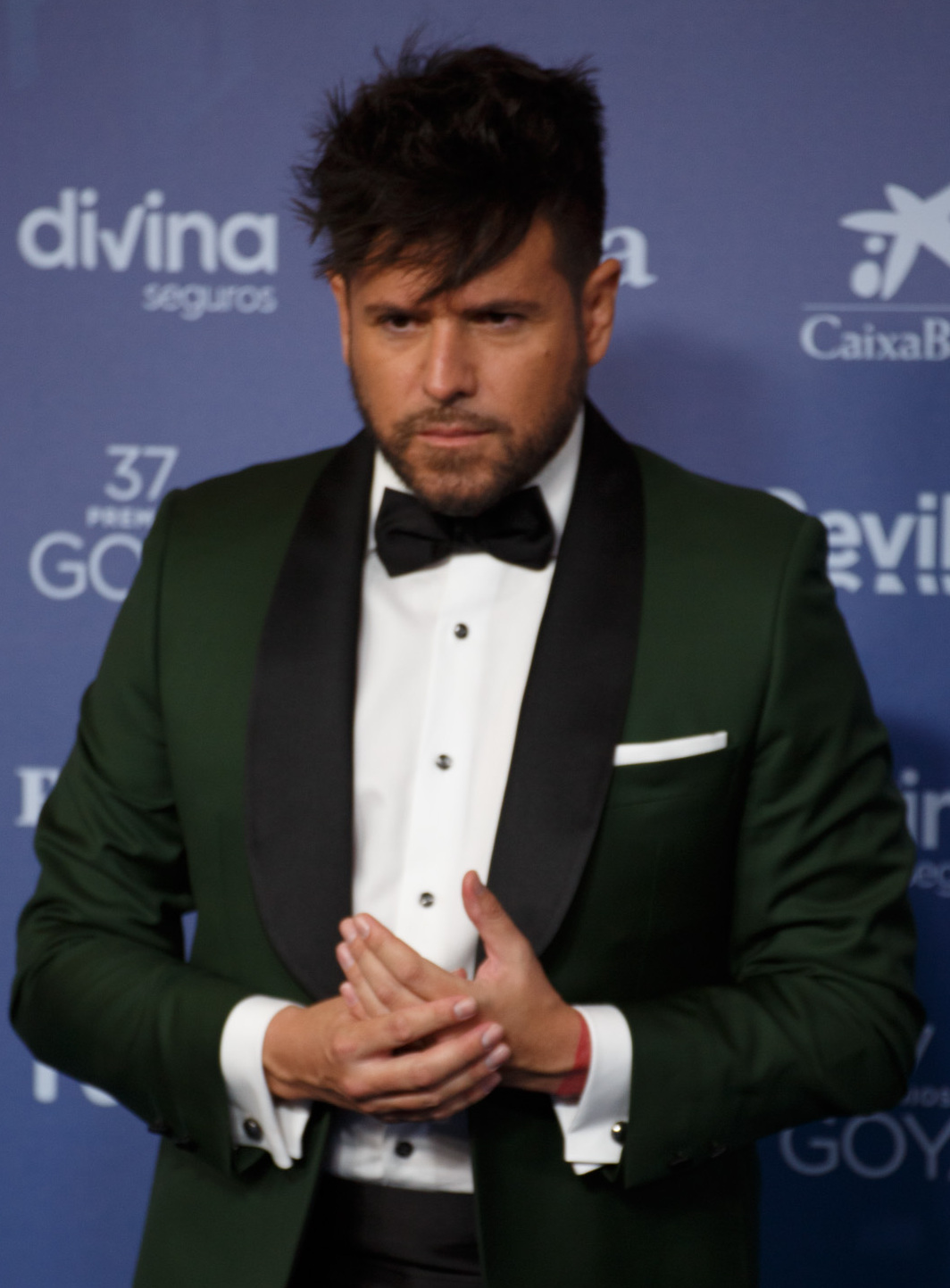
Pablo López

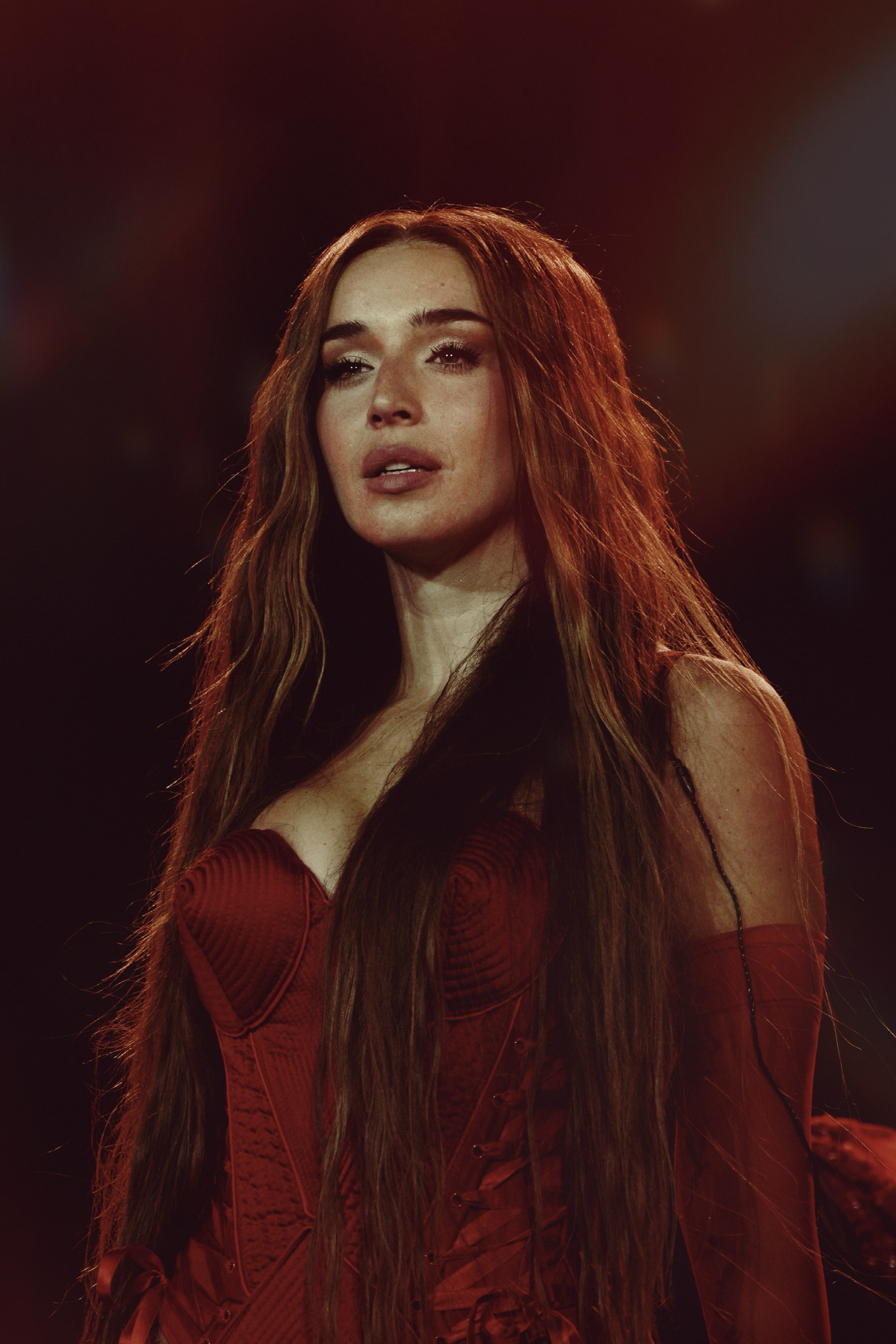
Lola Índigo

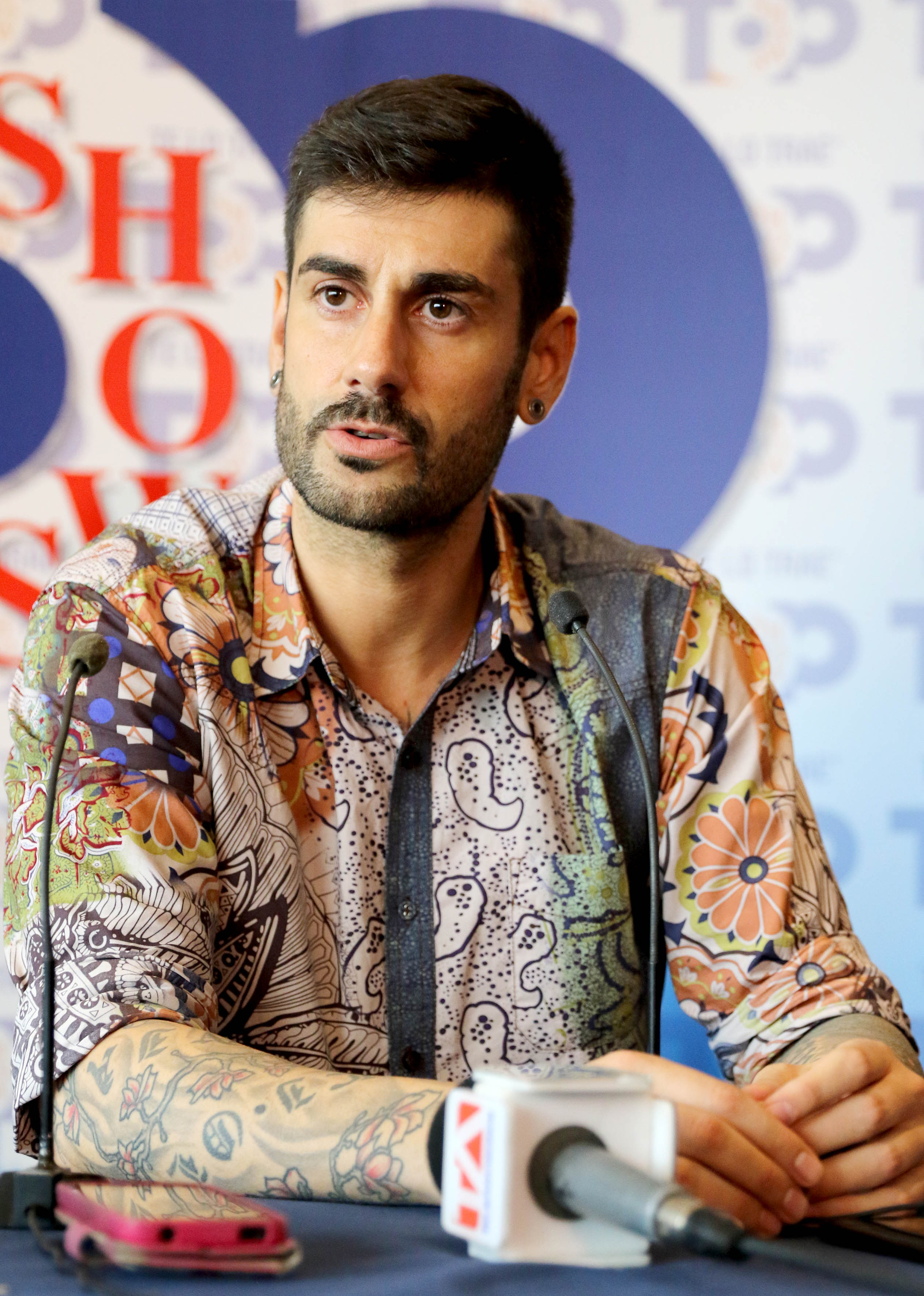
Melendi

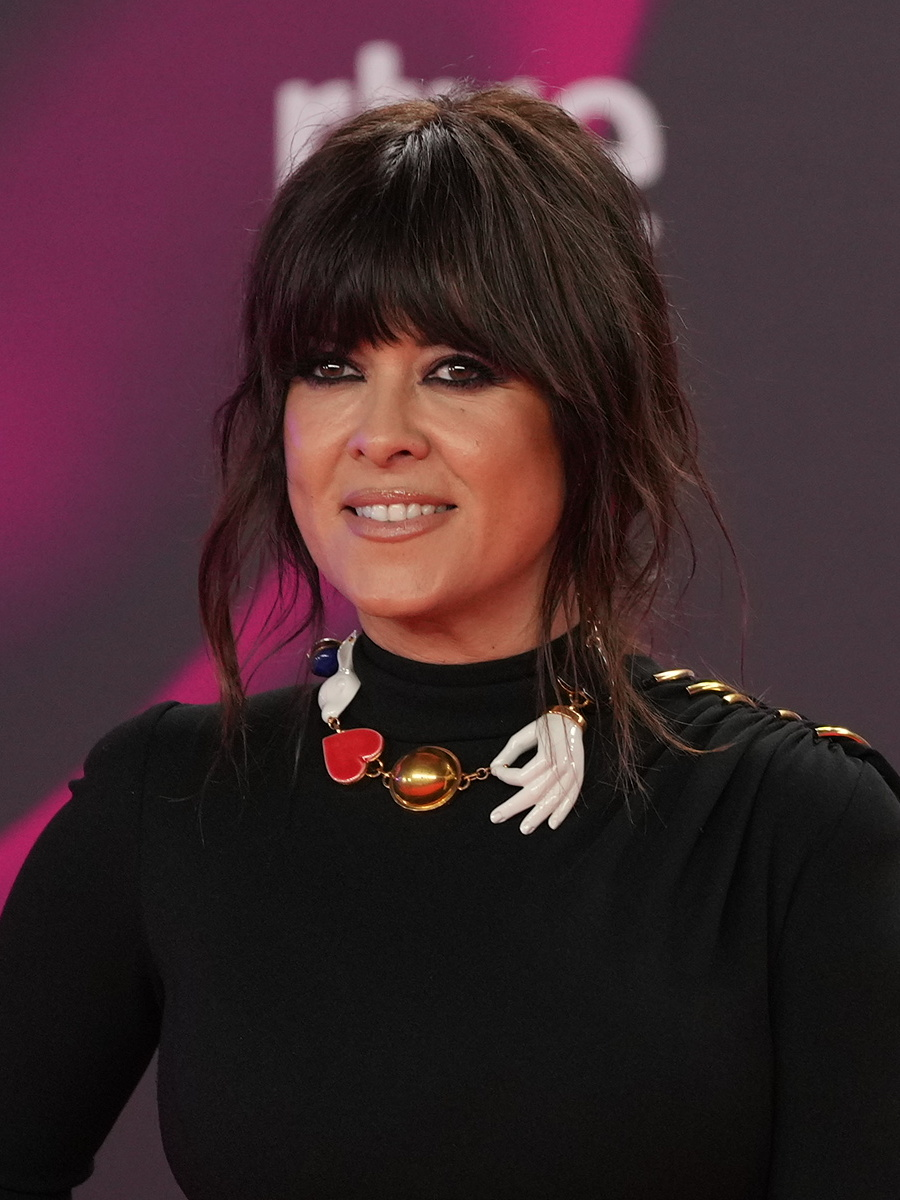
Vanesa Martín (second chance)

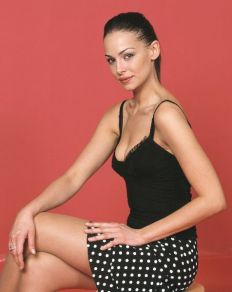
Eva González (host)

On 10 June 2026, the coaching panel was announced to consist of returning coaches Pablo López and Mika, who both return for their eighth and second seasons, respectively. Former coach Melendi returned to the panel this season for his third season as a coach following an eight-season hiatus, replacing Sebastián Yatra. Lola Índigo, who previously served as a coach on La Voz Kids, joined the panel this season as a debuting coach, replacing Malú. Eva González returned as host for her eighth consecutive season.

== Teams ==
- Winner
- Runner-up
- Third Place
- Fourth Place
- Artist was Eliminated in Semifinal
- Artist was Eliminated in Quarter-Final
- Artist was Eliminated in the Cross Battles
- Artist was Eliminated in the Battle of Winners
- Artist was Stolen in the Battles
- Artist was Eliminated in the Battles

| Coach | Top 56 Artists | | | | |
|---|---|---|---|---|---|
| Mika | Aura Gómez | Carlos Martínez | Rubén Mengod | Nicolás Cogollos | Marcos Díaz |
| Mika | Izan Gómez | Pitú Fequer | Teresa Fontana | Beltrán Yúfera | ~~Susana de Diego~~ |
| Mika | Nerea Fernández | Lingyun Jiang | Isabel Olmo | Ana Palomino | Pedro Yeste |
| Pablo López | Jhon Jairo Azuero | Lúcia Baizán | Adriana Moreno | Carla Quesada | Paz Samarán |
| Pablo López | Karim Carlos Temsamani | Pau Culleré | Leticia Fernández | Nerea Jiménez | ~~Omar Es-Souidak~~ |
| Pablo López | Ambrosio Cantú | Mónica Krause | Marina Melgar | Sergio Molina | Mariona Muntanya |
| Lola Índigo | Raúl Bagán | Kika Cardoso | Estrella Marina | Irene Molina | Borja Piñero |
| Lola Índigo | Charlotte Summers | Marta Berlín | Susana de Diego | Julieta Ruffini | ~~Nerea Jiménez~~ |
| Lola Índigo | Sean Clapis | Jhonatan Fernández | Idoia López | Elena Mesa | Rubén Thurnim |
| Melendi | Enrique Chávez | Manuela de la Fuente | Ana Muñoz | Marta Salas | José Torres |
| Melendi | Omar Es-Souidak | Lorena Bonnin | Cláudia Goicoechea | Darío Vidal | ~~Aura Gómez~~ |
| Melendi | Rachel Barranco | Javier González | Sonia Manso | Ana Sabando | Ismael Taboada |
Note: Italicized names are stolen artists (names struck through within former teams). Underlined names are artists rescued in the "second chance." Bold names are recipients of the "repentance button."

== Blind Auditions ==
The first stage of the show, the blind auditions, premiered 18 September 2026. In this stage, artists perform on stage with coaches turned away from them in rotating chairs. If a coach is interested in working with the artist, he/she will press the main button on his/her chair to spin the chair towards the artist. If more than one coach turns, the artist gets to select his/her team. Like last season, the "block" feature returned, which allows a coach to effectively block another coach from getting an artist. This feature can be used twice per coach, however Melendi did not use either of his 2 blocks. The "superblock" also returned, which allows a coach to block another coach after the performance has ended. This feature can be used thrice per coach. The "megablock" feature, given once to each coach, allows a coach to block every other coach, automatically defaulting the artist to his/her team. Additionally, each coach receives one "botón del arrepentimiento" (repentance button) to use. The concept allows a coach to acquire an originally eliminated artist (the artist did not receive a turn in the duration of his/her performance) and save that artist once all the chairs have spun around. At the end of the blind auditions, Índigo did not use her repentance button.

Blind auditions color key
| ✔ | Coach pressed "I WANT YOU" button |
| | Artist selected a coach's team |
| | Artist defaulted to a coach's team |
| | Artist was eliminated |
| | Artist was originally eliminated, but a coach pressed the "repentance button" |
| ✘ | Coach pressed "I WANT YOU" button, but was blocked by another coach from getting the artist |
| ✘ | Coach pressed "I WANT YOU" button, but was superblocked by another coach from getting the artist |
| ✘ | Coach pressed "I WANT YOU" button, but was megablocked by another coach from getting the artist |
| | Blocked by Mika; Blocked by Pablo; Blocked by Lola; Blocked by Melendi |

=== Blind Auditions Results ===
Blind auditions results
| Episode | Order | Artist | Age | Hometown | Song | Coach's and artist's choices | | | |
| Episode | Order | Artist | Age | Hometown | Song | Mika | Pablo | Lola | Melendi |
|---|---|---|---|---|---|---|---|---|---|
| Episode 1 (18 September) | 1 | Adriana Moreno | 31 | Madrid | "Garganta con arena" | ✔ | ✔ | ✘ | ✘ |
| Episode 1 (18 September) | 2 | Mónica Krause | 24 | Orihuela | "Sargento de hierro" | ✔ | ✔ | — | ✘ |
| Episode 1 (18 September) | 3 | Beltrán Yúfera | 26 | Seville | "Tus muletas" | — | — | — | — |
| Episode 1 (18 September) | 4 | Charlotte Summers | 20 | Marbella | "Million Years Ago" | ✘ | ✘ | ✔ | ✘ |
| Episode 1 (18 September) | 5 | Leticia Fernández | 22 | La Bañeza | "Ojalá" | ✔ | ✔ | — | — |
| Episode 1 (18 September) | 6 | Rubén Mengod | 27 | La Pobla de Vallbona | "Cuando los ojos abría" | ✔ | — | — | — |
| Episode 1 (18 September) | 7 | Manuela de la Fuente | 18 | Bollullos de la Mitación | "I'll Never Love Again" | — | — | ✘^{1} | ✔ |
| Episode 1 (18 September) | 8 | Lúcia Baizán | 18 | San Fernando | "Te espero aquí" | — | ✔ | — | — |
| Episode 1 (18 September) | 9 | Izan Gómez | 18 | Sant Joan d'Alacant | "Love in the Dark" | ✔ | — | — | — |
| Episode 1 (18 September) | 10 | Cláudia Goicoechea | 21 | Pamplona | "Make You Feel My Love" | ✔ | — | ✔ | ✔ |
| Episode 1 (18 September) | 11 | Irene Rodríguez | 30 | Madrid | "En cambio no" | — | — | — | — |
| Episode 1 (18 September) | 12 | Borja Piñero | 30 | Seville | "Oops!... I Did It Again" | — | — | ✔ | — |
| Episode 2 (25 September) | 1 | Paz Samarán | 22 | Pozuelo de Alarcón | "Fuentes de Ortiz" | ✔ | ✔ | — | — |
| Episode 2 (25 September) | 2 | Enrique Chávez | 35 | Getafe | "O mio babbino caro" | ✔ | — | — | ✔ |
| Episode 2 (25 September) | 3 | Irene Molina | 19 | Málaga | "Envidia" | ✔ | ✘ | ✔ | ✘ |
| Episode 2 (25 September) | 4 | Aura Gómez | 25 | Madrid | "Yo me quedo aquí contigo" | — | — | — | ✔ |
| Episode 2 (25 September) | 5 | Carlos Martínez | 18 | Bollullos Par del Condado | "Bohemian Rhapsody" | ✔ | ✘ | ✘ | ✘ |
| Episode 2 (25 September) | 6 | Emma Valdivieso | 22 | Las Palmas | "Halo" | — | — | — | — |
| Episode 2 (25 September) | 7 | Susana de Diego | 24 | Santa Marta de Tormes | "Waiting Room" | ✔ | ✔ | — | — |
| Episode 2 (25 September) | 8 | Jhonatan Fernández | 40 | Láchar | "Por culpa de tu cariño" | ✔ | ✘ | ✔ | ✔ |
| Episode 2 (25 September) | 9 | Zulema Ramos | 19 | Las Palmas De Gran Canaria | "Wildflower" | — | — | — | — |
| Episode 2 (25 September) | 10 | Karim Carlos Temsamani | 33 | Las Palmas De Gran Canaria | "Aïcha" | ✔ | ✔ | ✘ | — |
| Episode 2 (25 September) | 11 | Aitor Castells | 50 | Madrid | "Father and Son" | — | — | — | — |
| Episode 2 (25 September) | 12 | Kika Cardoso | 45 | Lisbon | "I Put a Spell on You" | — | — | ✔ | ✔ |
| Episode 3 (2 October) | 1 | Beltrán Yúfera | 26 | Seville | "Y si lo hacemos" | ✔ | ✘ | — | — |
| Episode 3 (2 October) | 2 | Marta Berlín | 20 | Las Palmas De Gran Canaria | "La Reina" | ✔ | ✔ | ✔ | — |
| Episode 3 (2 October) | 3 | Rachel Barranco | 31 | Zaragoza | "Malagueña Salerosa" | ✔ | — | ✔ | ✔ |
| Episode 3 (2 October) | 4 | Inés Pereira | 18 | Torrelodones | "Bound to You" | — | — | — | — |
| Episode 3 (2 October) | 5 | Omar Es-Souidak | 25 | Barcelona | "Dancing on My Own" | ✘ | ✔ | ✘ | ✘ |
| Episode 3 (2 October) | 6 | Sonia Manso | 27 | Segovia | "Alma mía" | ✔ | ✔ | — | ✔ |
| Episode 3 (2 October) | 7 | Teresa Fontana | 26 | Madrid | "Je veux" | ✔ | — | — | ✔ |
| Episode 3 (2 October) | 8 | Jhon Jairo Azuero | 21 | Murcia | "Listen" | ✔ | ✔ | ✔ | ✔ |
| Episode 3 (2 October) | 9 | Toni & Melissa | 35/25 | Benalmádena | "Don't Let Go (Love)" | — | — | — | — |
| Episode 3 (2 October) | 10 | Marta Salas | 19 | Jerez de la Frontera | "Sexo, Violencia y Llantas" | ✔ | ✔ | — | ✔ |
| Episode 3 (2 October) | 11 | Nerea Fernández | 21 | Puerto Real | "Nana triste" | — | — | — | — |
| Episode 3 (2 October) | 12 | Elena Mesa | 28 | Las Palmas De Gran Canaria | "Someone New" | ✔ | — | ✔ | —^{2} |
| Episode 4 (9 October) | 1 | Javier González | 24 | Oviedo | "Coal" | — | — | — | ✔ |
| Episode 4 (9 October) | 2 | Mariona Muntanya | 19 | Sabadell | "Palabra prohibida" | ✔ | ✔ | ✔ | — |
| Episode 4 (9 October) | 3 | Sean Clapis | 38 | Torrelodones | "Smile" | — | ✔ | ✔ | — |
| Episode 4 (9 October) | 4 | Carmen Vicente | 28 | Madrid | "Quando me'n vo'" | — | — | — | — |
| Episode 4 (9 October) | 5 | Raúl Bagán | 22 | L'Alcora | "Lucha de gigantes" | ✔ | ✔ | ✔ | — |
| Episode 4 (9 October) | 6 | Noelia Sakura | 30 | Álora | "Hana" | — | — | — | — |
| Episode 4 (9 October) | 7 | Nicolás Cogollos | 23 | Madrid | "I Can't Make You Love Me" | ✔ | ✘ | — | ✔ |
| Episode 4 (9 October) | 8 | Ismael Taboada | 28 | Fene | "Clima Tropical" | ✔ | — | — | ✔ |
| Episode 4 (9 October) | 9 | Isabel Olmo | 26 | Torre-Pacheco | "Nunca vas a comprender" | ✔ | — | — | — |
| Episode 4 (9 October) | 10 | Miguel Ángel Rivas | 25 | Seville | "Watermelon Sugar" | — | — | — | — |
| Episode 4 (9 October) | 11 | Nerea Fernández | 23 | León | "Stand Up" | ✔ | — | — | ✔ |
| Episode 4 (9 October) | 12 | Ana Sabando | 40 | Madrid | "(They Long to Be) Close to You" | — | — | — | ✔ |
| Episode 5 (16 October) | 1 | Lorena Bonnin | 22 | Palma de Mallorca | "All I Ask of You" | ✘ | — | — | ✔ |
| Episode 5 (16 October) | 2 | Pedro Yeste | 22 | Seville | "Cry Me a River" | ✔ | — | ✔ | — |
| Episode 5 (16 October) | 3 | Ambrosio Cantú | 23 | Canet d'en Berenguer | "Your Place At My Place" | — | ✔ | — | — |
| Episode 5 (16 October) | 4 | Marcos Díaz | 20 | Alhaurín de la Torre | "Die on This Hill" | ✔ | ✘ | — | ✔ |
| Episode 5 (16 October) | 5 | Olga Domenech | 52 | Colmenar Viejo | "Maybe This Time" | — | — | — | — |
| Episode 5 (16 October) | 6 | Darío Vidal | 22 | Valencia | "Someone You Loved" | — | — | — | ✔ |
| Episode 5 (16 October) | 7 | Nerea Jiménez | 18 | O Barco de Valdeorras | "All I Ask" | — | — | ✔ | — |
| Episode 5 (16 October) | 8 | Lingyun Jiang | 31 | Venturada | "Altas montañas" | ✔ | — | — | — |
| Episode 5 (16 October) | 9 | Andrea Solis | 24 | Girona | "Home" | — | — | — | — |
| Episode 5 (16 October) | 10 | Marina Melgar | 25 | Madrid | "Si Te Vas" | — | ✔ | — | — |
| Episode 5 (16 October) | 11 | José Torres | 40 | Consuegra | "Me quedo contigo" | ✔ | — | — | ✔ |
| Episode 5 (16 October) | 12 | Daniel García | 19 | Vallmoll | "Human | — | — | — | — |
| Episode 5 (16 October) | 13 | Elena de Sande | 19 | Vallmoll | "Víveme" | — | — | — | — |
| Episode 5 (16 October) | 14 | Rubén Thurnim | 51 | Benalmádena | "Stuck on You" | — | — | ✔ | — |
| Episode 6 (23 October) | 1 | Sergio Molina | 21 | Madrid | "Siempre es de noche" | ✔ | ✔ | — | — |
| Episode 6 (23 October) | 2 | Estela | 18 | Sant Boi de Llobregat | "She Used to Be Mine" | — | — | — | — |
| Episode 6 (23 October) | 3 | Ana Muñoz | 25 | Manilva | "Al alba" | ✘ | ✘ | ✘ | ✔ |
| Episode 6 (23 October) | 4 | Pau Culleré | 23 | Balaguer | "Nacido pa ganar" | — | ✔ | — | Team full |
| Episode 6 (23 October) | 5 | Pitú Fequer | 39 | Madrid | "O que é o amor" | ✔ | ✔ | — | Team full |
| Episode 6 (23 October) | 6 | Russingers | 28–39 | Madrid | "El patio" | — | — | — | Team full |
| Episode 6 (23 October) | 7 | Julieta Ruffini | 21 | Las Palmas | "Shallow" | — | ✔ | ✔ | Team full |
| Episode 6 (23 October) | 8 | Anya Mezzasalma | 24 | Benalúa | "Je suis malade" | — | — | — | Team full |
| Episode 6 (23 October) | 9 | Ana Palomino | 18 | Palomares del Río | "Almost Is Never Enough" | ✔ | ✘ | ✔ | Team full |
| Episode 6 (23 October) | 10 | Carla Quesada | 22 | Mallorca | "When We Were Young" | Team full | ✔ | ✔ | Team full |
| Episode 6 (23 October) | 11 | Idoia López | 21 | Alicante | "You Don't Own Me" | Team full | Team full | ✔ | Team full |
| Episode 6 (23 October) | 12 | Agustín Vega | 40 | Madrid | "Your Song" | Team full | Team full | — | Team full |
| Episode 6 (23 October) | 13 | Estrella Marina | 19 | San Cristóbal de La Laguna | "Mio Cristo Piange Diamanti" | Team full | Team full | ✔ | Team full |

- ^1 Melendi unintentionally blocked Lola. Nonetheless, the block remained.
- ^2 Lola unintentionally turned her chair by accidentally pressing the button to block Melendi on her chair with her leg. Lola was eligible to be picked as a coach; however, the block did not count.

== Battles ==
The battles aired on 30 October and 6 November 2026. This season, the artists perform in duos and each coach selects one from the pair to advance to the Battle of Winners. Each coach gets one red card to give to one of their artists a fast pass to the live shows. Each coach has one steal to add to their team. However, unlike previous seasons, the steals come from artists that were previously selected to win the battle by their coach. In total, each coach selects nine artists to advance to the Battle of the Winners. Additionally, this season was the first in the history of the show to not feature advisors to aid the coaches in their decisions.

For the first time in the history of the show, a fifth coach is featured beginning in this round. Former La Voz Kids coach Vanesa Martín was featured in the role of providing a "second chance" to artists that she selects that previously lost their battle. One artist per team per episode was selected by Martín, saving them from elimination.

Battles color key
| Artist was chosen by his/her coach to advance and coach used the red card, sending the artist directly to the live shows |
| Artist was chosen by his/her coach to advance to the Battle of Winners |
| Artist was chosen by his/her coach to advance to the Battle of Winners, but was later stolen by another coach |
| Artist was originally eliminated, but was selected for a "second chance" by Vanesa Martín |
| Artist was eliminated |

Battles Results
| Episode | Coach | Order | Winner | Song | Loser |
|---|---|---|---|---|---|
| Episode 7 (30 October) | Melendi | 1 | Manuela de la Fuente | "You Are the Reason" | Ismael Taboada |
| Episode 7 (30 October) | Melendi | 2 | Marta Salas | "Devuélveme la vida" | Rachel Barranco |
| Episode 7 (30 October) | Melendi | 3 | Enrique Chávez | "Who Wants to Live Forever" | Lorena Bonnin |
| Episode 7 (30 October) | Pablo López | 4 | Jhon Jairo Azuero | "Die with a Smile" | Mariona Muntanya |
| Episode 7 (30 October) | Pablo López | 5 | Lúcia Baizán | "Aunque sea un momento" | Adriana Moreno |
| Episode 7 (30 October) | Pablo López | 6 | Carla Quesada | "Mía" | Mónica Krause |
| Episode 7 (30 October) | Pablo López | 7 | Pau Culleré | "Yellow" | Ambrosio Cantú |
| Episode 7 (30 October) | Lola Índigo | 8 | Kika Cardoso | "(I've Had) The Time of My Life" | Rubén Thurnim |
| Episode 7 (30 October) | Lola Índigo | 9 | Raúl Bagán | "Algo contigo" | Elena Mesa |
| Episode 7 (30 October) | Lola Índigo | 10 | Marta Berlín | "Tu Recuerdo" | Jhonatan Fernández |
| Episode 7 (30 October) | Lola Índigo | 11 | Estrella Marina | "Love on the Brain" | Irene Molina |
| Episode 7 (30 October) | Mika | 12 | Pitú Fequer | "Yo sé que te amaré" | Isabel Olmo |
| Episode 7 (30 October) | Mika | 13 | Nicolás Cogollos | "Human" | Lingyun Jiang |
| Episode 7 (30 October) | Mika | 14 | Carlos Martínez | "I'm Not the Only One" | Izan Gómez |
| Episode 8 (6 November) | Lola Índigo | 1 | Julieta Ruffini | "Midnight Sun" | Charlotte Summers |
| Episode 8 (6 November) | Lola Índigo | 2 | Nerea Jiménez (Stolen by Pablo) | "La tirana" | Idoia López |
| Episode 8 (6 November) | Lola Índigo | 3 | Borja Piñero | "Sweet Child o' Mine" | Sean Clapis |
| Episode 8 (6 November) | Mika | 4 | Marcos Díaz | "Momma Song" | Ana Palomino |
| Episode 8 (6 November) | Mika | 5 | Beltrán Yúfera | "Salitre" | Rubén Mengod |
| Episode 8 (6 November) | Mika | 6 | Susana de Diego (Stolen by Lola) | "Candy" | Pedro Yeste |
| Episode 8 (6 November) | Mika | 7 | Teresa Fontana | "The Visitor" | Nerea Fernández |
| Episode 8 (6 November) | Pablo López | 8 | Omar Es-Souidak (Stolen by Melendi) | "Bruises" | Sergio Molina |
| Episode 8 (6 November) | Pablo López | 9 | Leticia Fernández | "Ayer soñé contigo" | Paz Samarán |
| Episode 8 (6 November) | Pablo López | 10 | Karim Carlos Temsamani | "Titanic" | Marina Melgar |
| Episode 8 (6 November) | Melendi | 11 | Cláudia Goicoechea | "Set Fire to the Rain" | Ana Sabando |
| Episode 8 (6 November) | Melendi | 12 | Darío Vidal | "Say You Won't Let Go" | Javier González |
| Episode 8 (6 November) | Melendi | 13 | Aura Gómez (Stolen by Mika) | "Mi historia entre tus dedos" | Sonia Manso |
| Episode 8 (6 November) | Melendi | 14 | José Torres | "Nostalgias" | Ana Muñoz |

== Battle of Winners ==
The Battle of Winners (Batalla de Ganadores in Spanish) aired on 13 November 2026. In this round, the winning artists from the battles are paired once more to advance to the Cross Battles. However, unlike the battles, the artists in each pair sing separately. In this round, the voting public was able to advance one winning artist per team to the live shows.

Vanesa Martín was present once more to save one losing artist per team.

Battle of Winners color key
| Artist was chosen the public to be sent directly to the live shows |
| Artist was chosen by his/her coach to advance to the Cross Battles |
| Artist was originally eliminated, but was selected for a "second chance" by Vanesa Martín |
| Artist was eliminated |

Battle of Winners Results
| Episode | Coach | Order | Song | Winner | Loser | Song |
|---|---|---|---|---|---|---|
| Episode 9 (13 November) | Pablo López | 1 | "Girls Just Want to Have Fun" | Carla Quesada | Nerea Jiménez | "If I Were a Boy" |
| Episode 9 (13 November) | Pablo López | 2 | "Contigo" | Adriana Moreno | Leticia Fernández | "Con las ganas" |
| Episode 9 (13 November) | Pablo López | 3 | "La Vie en rose" | Karim Carlos Temsamani | Pau Culleré | "No dudaría" |
| Episode 9 (13 November) | Pablo López | 4 | "Ojos de gata" | Paz Samarán | Lúcia Baizán | "Tu refugio" |
| Episode 9 (13 November) | Melendi | 1 | "In the Stars" | Omar Es-Souidak | Darío Vidal | "Lose Control" |
| Episode 9 (13 November) | Melendi | 2 | "Che farò senza Euridice" | Enrique Chávez | Claudia Goicoechea | "L'amour de ma vie" |
| Episode 9 (13 November) | Melendi | 3 | "Ramito de violetas" | José Torres | Lorena Bonnin | "I Dreamed a Dream" |
| Episode 9 (13 November) | Melendi | 4 | "Cuando zarpa el amor" | Ana Muñoz | Marta Salas | "Durmiendo sola" |
| Episode 9 (13 November) | Lola Índigo | 1 | "If I Ain't Got You" | Charlotte Summers | Kika Cardoso | "When You Believe" |
| Episode 9 (13 November) | Lola Índigo | 2 | "Creep" | Irene Molina | Susana de Diego | "Both Sides, Now" |
| Episode 9 (13 November) | Lola Índigo | 3 | "Born This Way" | Borja Piñero | Julieta Ruffini | "Agárrate" |
| Episode 9 (13 November) | Lola Índigo | 4 | "Focu 'Ranni" | Estrella Marina | Marta Berlín | "Te lo agradezco" |
| Episode 9 (13 November) | Mika | 1 | "Younger You" | Marcos Díaz | Nicolás Cogollos | "Car's Outside" |
| Episode 9 (13 November) | Mika | 2 | "Del miércoles al martes" | Rubén Mengod | Pitú Fequer | "Flor de lis" |
| Episode 9 (13 November) | Mika | 3 | "Limón y sal" | Aura Gómez | Teresa Fontana | "Quelqu'un m'a dit" |
| Episode 9 (13 November) | Mika | 4 | "Break My Heart Again" | Izan Gómez | Beltrán Yúfera | "Todo cambia" |

== Cross Battles ==
The Cross Battles (Batallas Cruzadas in Spanish aired on 20 November 2026. The remaining four artists on each team (that had not already advanced to the live shows) perform with an artist from a different team, for a total of eight more spots in the live shows. The two artists perform their respective blind audition songs and the winner of the public vote moves on. Due to the results being solely on the public's vote, all of a coach's remaining four artists could move on to the live shows, or none. At the end of the round, three artists each from Teams Lola and Melendi moved on, and one artist each from Teams Mika and Pablo moved on; Lola and Melendi both have five artists in the live shows and Mika and Pablo both have three.

Cross Battles color key
| Artist was chosen by the public to advance to the live shows |
| Artist was eliminated |

Cross Battles results
| Episode | Order | Challenger | | | Challenged | | |
| Episode | Order | Coach | Song | Artist | Artist | Song | Coach |
|---|---|---|---|---|---|---|---|
| Episode 10 (20 November) | 1 | Melendi | "Dancing on My Own" | Omar Es-Souidak | Lúcia Baizán | "Te espero aquí" | Pablo López |
| Episode 10 (20 November) | 2 | Mika | "Die on This Hill" | Marcos Díaz | Borja Piñero | "Oops!… I Did It Again" | Lola Índigo |
| Episode 10 (20 November) | 3 | Pablo López | "Aïcha" | Karim Carlos Temsamani | Rubén Mengod | "Cuando los ojos abría" | Mika |
| Episode 10 (20 November) | 4 | Lola Índigo | "Million Years Ago" | Charlotte Summers | Marta Salas | "Sexo, Violencia y Llantas" | Melendi |
| Episode 10 (20 November) | 5 | Melendi | "Al alba" | Ana Muñoz | Nicolás Cogollos | "I Can't Make You Love Me" | Mika |
| Episode 10 (20 November) | 6 | Mika | "Love in the Dark" | Izan Gómez | Enrique Chávez | "O mio babbino caro" | Melendi |
| Episode 10 (20 November) | 7 | Pablo López | "Fuentes de Ortiz" | Paz Samarán | Estrella Marina | "Mio Cristo Piange Diamanti" | Lola Índigo |
| Episode 10 (20 November) | 8 | Lola Índigo | "I Put a Spell on You" | Kika Cardoso | Carla Quesada | "When We Were Young" | Pablo López |

== Live shows ==
=== Week 1: Quarter-Final ===
The Lives aired on 27 November 2026. The Top 16 artists performed individually for a spot in the Semi-Final.

Week 1: Quarter-Final color key
| Artist was saved by public's vote and advanced to the Semi-Final |
| Artist was saved by his/her coach and advanced to the Semi-Final |
| Artist was eliminated |

Week 1: Quarter-Final Performances & Results
| Episode | Coach | Order | Artist | Song | Results |

== Elimination chart ==
Artist's info

- Team Mika
- Team Pablo
- Team Lola
- Team Melendi

Result details

- Winner
- Runner-up
- Third place
- Fourth place
- Saved by the public
- Saved by her/his coach
- Eliminated

Live shows results per week
| Artists | Week 1 | Week 2 | Week 3 Finale |
|---|---|---|---|
| Jhon Jairo Azuero | | | |
| Raúl Bagán | | | |
| Lúcia Baizán | | | |
| Kika Cardoso | | | |
| Enrique Chávez | | | |
| Manuela de la Fuente | | | |
| Aura Gómez | | | |
| Estrella Marina | | | |
| Carlos Martínez | | | |
| Rubén Mengod | | | |
| Irene Molina | | | |
| Adriana Moreno | | | |
| Ana Muñoz | | | |
| Borja Piñero | | | |
| Marta Salas | | | |
| José Torres | | | |
