= Maldición =

2019 song by Lola Índigo and Lalo Ebratt

Single by Lola Índigo and Lalo Ebratt

from the album Akelarre
- Language: Spanish
- English title: "Curse"
- Released: 26 April 2019
- Recorded: 2018
- Genre: Pop trap
- Length: 3:08
- Label: Universal Music
- Songwriter(s): Eduardo Mario Ebratt; Felipe González Abad; Miguel Ángel Ospino; Miriam Doblas Muñoz
- Producer(s): Yera; Nabález

Lola Índigo singles chronology
"Mujer Bruja" (2018)	"Maldición" (2019)	"Me Quedo" (2019)

Lalo Ebratt singles chronology
"No Todavía" (2019)	"Maldición" (2019)	"Andan Diciendo" (2019)

"Maldición" (Spanish for "Curse") is a song recorded by Spanish singer Lola Índigo in collaboration with Colombian rapper Lalo Ebratt. The track was released on 26 April 2019 though Universal Music Spain as the third and final single of Indigo's debut studio album Akelarre (2019). "Maldición" peaked at number 21 on the PROMUSICAE chart and is certified gold in Spain for selling over 20,000 copies. The single also charted in Colombia at number 80, marking the first single of Indigo to enter a musical chart outside Spain.

== Background ==
After releasing her second single "Mujer Bruja", Indigo began teasing her debut studio album and revealed that it would have a concept focused in witchery. On 15 March 2019, she announced that "Akelarre" would be released in April which didn't happen because of multiple delays due to disagreements with the record label. Through her respective social networks, Lola Indigo announced on April 20 that the third single from her new album "Maldición", in collaboration with Colombian rapper Lalo Ebratt, would be released on April 26 of that same year.

== Music video ==
The music video for "Maldición" was released on April 26 and features both singers and multiple dancers jamming to the song. The videoclip features some dark scenarios, a recreation of Lucifer's throne and also shows Indigo blending the appearance of The Birth of Venus as painted by Sandro Botticelli in the 1480s decade. The music video received over one million views in its first 24 hours and was the most-bought music video on ITunes Spain for a small amount of hours.

== Live performances ==
Indigo performed "Maldición" for the first time as part of her Indigo Tour on 27 April 2019, when she performed at the Dance Park Festival in Torrejón de Ardoz. Indigo also performed the single and on other several festivals as well as on her Akelarre Tour, which run from May to November 2019 and is set to begin a festival extension in June 2020. The song was first performed on live television on May 16 at El Hormiguero, Spain's main and most-watched late night show. Indigo also sang the track at the Los40 Primavera Pop shows in Barcelona and Madrid, with the last one being aired on Divinity.

== Charts ==
Chart (2019)	Peak position
Colombia (National-Report)	80
Spain (PROMUSICAE)	21

== Certifications ==
Region	Certification	Certified units/sales
Spain (PROMUSICAE)	Gold	20,000^{‡}
^{‡} Sales+streaming figures based on certification alone.

== Release history ==
Country	Date	Format	Label
Various	26 April 2019	Digital download; streaming	Universal Music
Spain	28 April 2019	Contemporary hit radio	Universal Music
