= Lola Bunny (song) =

2019 song by Lola Indigo and Don Patricio

Single by Lola Indigo and Don Patricio

from the album La Niña
- Language: Spanish
- Released: 31 July 2019
- Recorded: 2019
- Genre: Urban pop
- Length: 3:07
- Label: Universal Music
- Songwriters: Mateus Maghalhaes de Seabra; Miriam Doblas Muñoz; Patricio Martín Díaz; Rodrigo Silvério do Carmo
- Producer: Stygo

Lola Indigo singles chronology
"Me Quedo" (2019)	"Lola Bunny" (2019)	"Autoestima (Remix)" (2019)

Don Patricio singles chronology
"¿Cómo Te Va, Querida?" (2019)	"Lola Bunny" (2019)	"Comunicado de Prensa" (2019)

"Lola Bunny" is a song recorded by Spanish singer Lola Indigo in collaboration with Canarian rapper Don Patricio. It was released as a single on 31 July 2019 through Universal Music Spain; this character is not related to the character of the same name from Looney Tunes. The track, produced by Stygo, reached the fourth position on the PROMUSICAE chart and is certified two times platinum in Spain for selling over 80,000 copies.

== Background ==
In January 2019, rapper Don Patricio released his second studio album La Dura Vida del Joven Rapero outside Locoplaya which features the three-week number one single "Contando Lunares" featuring Cruz Cafuné. From that moment on, the Canarian became extremely popular in his home country. Thus, Lola Indigo became very interested in interacting or musically collaborating with him. The two announced that they had working on a common project in June 2019 but did not reveal what it was until 16 July, when they both announced at Los40 Summer series concerts in Badajoz that the two would be collaborating on her newest single "Lola Bunny", which plays around with her stage name and the Looney Tunes character. The single was announced on social media the day after. The release date was announced four days later alongside the cover art reveal.

== Commercial performance ==
With only two days tracking, the song debuted at the fourth position on the PROMUSICAE chart and is still charting. On its release day, the song reached number-one in ITunes Spain and was the most-bought music video on the platform for a whole day. The music video for "Lola Bunny" was released the same day as the song on YouTube, where it received more than a million views in less than 24 hours. The single received 2.12 million streams on Spotify one week after its release. Speculations of a possible romantic relationship between the two artists (despite the performers' constant efforts to be silent) promoted by gossip magazines impulsed the single's sales. Later that year they officially announced that they are a couple.

The single was released physically as a 7-inch vinyl on 6 December 2019 to celebrate the Record Store Day. All 5,000 limited printed copies have been sold.

== Music video ==
The music video for Lola Bunny, directed by Alvaro Paz Fortis, premiered on YouTube on 31 July and received more than a million copies in the first 24 hours since its premiere and was the most-bought music video on ITunes Spain for a whole day. In a single week it received 4.31 million views. It shows both artists dancing in a basketball court and in a barber shop alongside habitual dancers Mónica Peña, Saydi Lubanzadio, Laura Ruiz y Claudia Riera.

== Live performances ==
"Lola Bunny" was performed for the first time ever in Torrelavega on 30 July 2019 as part of Los40 Summer concert series. Indigo included the song in the setlist of her 2019 'Akelarre Tour' while Don Patricio performed it in different festivals such as Riverland or Madrid Salvaje. The song has been performed at multiple festivals such as Arenal Sound or at the Coca-Cola Music Experience, with the last one being televised. The duo performed their track on live television for the first time on 8 November during the 2019 Los40 Music Awards. They reunited again to perform "Lola Bunny" together at TVE's the New Year's Eve special and at the first annual Premios Odeón, which congratulates Spanish performers and are equal to the "Spanish Grammys" in terms of phonography-industry importance and relevance.

== Charts ==
Chart (2019)	Peak position
Spain (PROMUSICAE)	4

== Certifications ==
Region	Certification	Certified units/sales
Spain (PROMUSICAE)	2× Platinum	80,000^{‡}
^{‡} Sales+streaming figures based on certification alone.

== Release history ==
Country	Date	Format	Label
Various	31 July 2019	Digital download; streaming	Universal Music
Spain	11 August 2019	Contemporary hit radio	Universal Music
Spain	6 December 2019	7-inch vinyl	Universal Music
