= Dirty Bailarina =

Studio album by La Mala Rodriguez
- Released: May 18, 2010
- Genres: R&B/Rap, hip hop
- Label: Universal Music Spain

La Mala Rodriguez chronology
Malamarismo (2007)	Dirty Bailarina (2010)	Bruja (2013)

Singles from Dirty Bailarina
- 1. "No Pidas Perdón" Released: May 2010; 2. "Un Corazón" Released: September 2010

Dirty Bailarina is the fourth studio album by Spanish hip hop singer La Mala Rodriguez.

== Critical reception ==
Professional ratings
Review scores
Source	Rating
AllMusic	4/5 stars

Dirty Bailarina received excellent reviews in the media and is one of the most successful releases in the career of La Mala Rodriguez, getting 2 nominations at the 2010 Latin Grammy Awards for Best Urban Album and winning Best Urban Song for the first single "No Pidas Perdón". The album was largely produced in Atlanta by Focus... producer of singers as Christina Aguilera, Jennifer Lopez and Eminem. Her first single was "No Pidas Perdón" a pop-rap song that went Top 30 in Spain. Her second single was "Un Corazón", the video was released on September 28 through VEVO account on YouTube.

== Track listing ==
No.	Title	Length
1.	"En La Linea"	3:30
2.	"Nene"	4:02
3.	"No Pidas Perdón"	3:27
4.	"Galaxias Cercanas"	3:29
5.	"Prima"	4:10
6.	"Interferencias"	1:11
7.	"Yo No Mato El Tiempo"	2:54
8.	"Ama"	3:33
9.	"Por Eso Mato"	3:38
10.	"Un Corazón"	3:44
11.	"Flores, Vitamina Y Mucho Sexo"	3:00
12.	"Patito Feo"	6:02

== Chart performance ==
Chart (2010)	Peak position
Spanish Albums Chart	11
