= Bruja (album) =

Studio album by La Mala Rodriguez
- Released: June 18, 2013
- Genre: R&B, rap, hip hop
- Length: 59:06
- Label: Universal Music
- Producer: Supernafamacho

La Mala Rodriguez chronology
| Dirty Bailarina (2010) | Bruja (2013) |

Singles from Bruja
- 1. "33"; 2. "La Rata"; 3. "Quien manda"

Professional ratings
Review scores
| Source | Rating |
|---|---|
| Mondo Sonoro | 8/10 |

Bruja is the fifth studio album by Spanish hip hop singer La Mala Rodriguez. It was released on June 18, 2013. On this album Rodriquez presents a combination of flamenco and rap.

Bruja was named "Best Urban Music Album" at the 2013 Latino Grammy Awards in Las Vegas. This was Rodriguez' second Latino Grammy.

== Track listing ==
1. Esclavos 3:43
2. Caja de Madera 2:54
3. 33 2:29
4. Cuando Tu Me Apagas 3:10
5. Caliente (feat. Sefyu) 4:46
6. Hazme Eso 3:19
7. Lluvia 3:21
8. Dorothy 3:33
9. La Rata 2:08
10. Quién Manda 2:47
11. Miedo a Volar 3:31
12. Ella (feat. Canserbero) 3:59
13. Quién Manda (feat. Rapsusklei) 3:31
