= Mujer bruja =

2018 song by Lola Índigo and Mala Rodríguez

"Mujer Bruja"

Single by Lola Índigo and Mala Rodríguez

from the album Akelarre
- Language: Spanish
- English title: "Witch"
- Released: 21 December 2018
- Recorded: 2018
- Genre: Pop
- Length: 3:23
- Label: Universal Music
- Songwriters: María Rodríguez Garrido; Miguel Ángel Ospino; Miriam Doblas Muñoz
- Producer: Yera

Lola Índigo singles chronology
"Ya No Quiero Ná" (2018)	"Mujer Bruja" (2018)	"Maldición" (2019)

Mala Rodríguez singles chronology
"Contigo" (2018)	"Mujer Bruja" (2018)	"Agua Segura" (2019)

"Mujer bruja" (Spanish for "Witch") is a song recorded by Spanish singer Lola Índigo in collaboration with Spanish rapper Mala Rodríguez. The track, produced by Yera was released as the second single from Indigo's debut studio album Akelarre (2019) on 21 December 2018 through Universal Music Spain. The single peaked at number six on the PROMUSICAE chart and is certified two times platinum.

== Background ==
Since Indigo (then known under her original name Mimi Doblas) left televised musical talent competition Operación Triunfo, she began working on her upcoming musical projects. Thanks to the success of her debut single "Ya No Quiero Ná", her record label expanded her contract in order to permit her release a full album. Thus, in order to follow the schedule, the Andalusian singer teamed up with hip-hop artist Mala Rodríguez to collaborate on her newest single. Indigo informed of the song's existence on 31 October and performed the song during her "Indigo Tour" (which started in Granada on 3 November 2018) while it was unreleased. The singer finally announced the official release of the track through her respective social media profiles on 18 December, three days before it came out.

== Music video ==
The music video for "Mujer Bruja" was filmed on 16 November 2018 and features both singers and multiple dancers jamming to the song next to a white background. Indigo also appears in a white bath tub. The music video received over one million views in its first 24 hours and was the most-bought music video on ITunes Spain for a small amount of hours.

== Live performances ==
Indigo performed "Mujer Bruja" for the first time on her "Indigo Tour" which consisted of 17 concerts celebrated between November 2018 and March 2019 and on several festivals as well as on her 2019 Akelarre Tour, which run from May to November 2019, comprising 33 concerts. The song was performed alongside "Ya No Quiero Ná" at the two OT2017 farewell concerts at the Palau Sant Jordi in Barcelona on 27 and 28 December. The track was also promoted on the most-watched Spanish late night show El Hormiguero in February 2019.

In February 2020, Junior Eurovision Song Contest winner María Isabel impressionated Indigo on television show Tu Cara Me Suena, where she performed the song.

== Charts ==
=== Weekly charts ===
Weekly chart performance for "Mujer bruja"
Chart (2019)	Peak position
Spain (PROMUSICAE)	6

=== Year-end charts ===
Year-end chart performance for "Mujer bruja"
Chart (2019)	Position
Spain (PROMUSICAE)	33

== Certifications ==
Region	Certification	Certified units/sales
Spain (PROMUSICAE)	2× Platinum	80,000^{‡}
^{‡} Sales+streaming figures based on certification alone.

== Release history ==
Country	Date	Format	Label
Various	21 December 2018	Digital download; streaming	Universal Music
Spain	13 January 2019	Contemporary hit radio	Universal Music
Spain	6 December 2019	7-inch vinyl	Universal Music
