= Santería (Lola Índigo, Danna Paola and Denise Rosenthal song) =

2020 single

Single by Lola Índigo, Danna Paola and Denise Rosenthal

from the album Akelarre (Edición Especial)
- Language: Spanish
- Released: 28 August 2020
- Genre: Latin pop, pop
- Length: 3:04
- Label: Universal Music Spain
- Songwriters: Lola Índigo; Denise Rosenthal; Danna Paola; David Murillo; German Duque; Felipe González Abad
- Producers: Mango; Nabález

Lola Índigo singles chronology
"Trendy" (2020)	"Santería" (2020)	"High (Remix)" (2020)

Danna Paola singles chronology
"Nada" (2020)	"Santería" (2020)	"Me, Myself" (2020)

Denise Rosenthal singles chronology
"Gira (El Mundo Gira)" (2020)	"Santería" (2020)	"Dormir" (2020)

Music video
- "Santería" on YouTube

"Santería" is a song recorded by Spanish singer Lola Índigo, Mexican singer Danna Paola and Chilean singer Denise Rosenthal. It was released on 28 August 2020, under the distribution of the label Universal Music. It was included on the special edition of Índigo's Akelarre album.

== Composition ==
The single was produced by Mango and Nabález, and mixed by Mosty. It is influenced by reggaeton, with the use of compressed voices. Rosenthal said that the song is "an invitation for all women to feel like queens in their spaces and find courage not to go through harmful experiences, it is a way to make the work of colleagues visible, and to create spaces for female references to exist and we can create an industry equitable and healthier".

== Music video ==
The music video, released the same day as the single, shows images of the Acrópolis of Mexico, Morocco's pavilion of the Expo Sevilla and the Andes mountains on Chile. It was directed by Álvaro Paz.

== Charts ==
Chart (2020)	Peak position
Chile (Monitor Latino)	12
Costa Rica (Monitor Latino)	11
Spain (PROMUSICAE)	15

== Certifications ==
Country	Organization	Certification	Sales	Ref.
Spain	PROMUSICAE	Gold	20.000	

== Awards and nominations ==
Year	Awards	Category	Result	Ref.
2020	Premios Musa (Musa Awards)	International Collaboration of the Year	Winner	

== Release history ==
Country	Date	Format	Label	Ref.
Various	28 August 2020	Digital download, streaming	Universal Music Spain	
