= Autoestima =

2019 song by Cupido, Lola Indigo and Alizzz

"Autoestima (Remix)"

Single by Cupido and Lola Indigo featuring Alizzz

from the album Préstame un Sentimiento
- Language: Spanish
- English title: "Self Esteem"
- Released: 9 August 2019
- Recorded: 2019
- Genre: Urban pop
- Length: 3:27
- Label: Universal Music; Primavera Sound
- Songwriters: Alejandro García Nespereira; Daniel Pedraja Batista; Daniel Rodríguez Huertas; Luis Sansó Gil; Toni Díaz García
- Producers: Cupido; Alizzz

Cupido singles chronology
"U Know" (2019)	"Autoestima (Remix)" (2019)	"La Pared" (2020)

Lola Indigo singles chronology
"Lola Bunny" (2019)	"Autoestima (Remix)" (2019)	"Luna" (2019)

"Autoestima" (Spanish for "Self Esteem") is a song recorded by Spanish group Cupido for their debut studio album Préstame un Sentimiento (2019). It was remixed and released as a single on 9 August 2019 through Universal Music Spain and Primavera Sound this time featuring vocals of Spanish singer Lola Indigo and production by Barcelonian musician Alizzz.

== Background ==
Spanish music group Cupido started in 2017 as a collaboration between drummer Solo Astra and singer Pimp Flaco and evolved into a 5-member supergroup defined by its "unique sound in the Spanish musical panorama, that mixes trap and independent music turning it into a very new pop". The formation released its first single "No Sabes Mentir" in 2017 and, since that moment, started shaping their debut studio album "Préstame Un Sentimiento", released on 14 February 2019. "Autoestima", included in the album, became an instant fan favorite. In order to make it a single and make their name even bigger, the group collaborated with ex-Operación Triunfo contestant Lola Indigo and with Catalan producer Alizzz who has made songs for and with C. Tangana, Becky G and Rosalía between others.

== Commercial performance ==
The remix of "Autoestima" debuted on the PROMUSICAE chart at number 74 and peaked at number 61 after two weeks. The song charted for five consecutive weeks. It was the most-played song during the 2019 MTV Video Music Awards retransmission breaks in Spain, the most-viewed VMA's in Spain in MTV history in large part due to the performance of Spanish singer turned international pop phenomenon Rosalía.

== Charts ==
Chart (2019)	Peak position
Spain (PROMUSICAE)	61

== Release history ==
Country	Date	Format	Label
Various	14 February 2019 (solo)	Digital download; streaming	Primavera Sound
Spain	9 August 2019 (remix)	Digital download; streaming	Universal Music; Primavera Sound
Spain	18 August 2019	Contemporary hit radio	Universal Music
