= Ya no quiero ná =

"Ya No Quiero Ná"

Single by Lola Índigo

from the album Akelarre
- Released: 20 July 2018
- Recorded: April 2018
- Genre: Funk; Pop; Urban
- Length: 3:12
- Label: Universal Music
- Songwriters: Bruno Valverde Juárez; Miriam Doblas Muñoz; Hajar Sbihi; Lewis Peter Pickett
- Producer: Bruno Valverde Juárez

Lola Índigo singles chronology
"Ya No Quiero Ná" (2018)	"Mujer Bruja" (2018)

Ya No Quiero Ná (Spanish for "I don't want anything anymore") is a song recorded by Spanish singer Lola Índigo. Written by Bruno Valverde, Hajar Sbihi, Lewis Peter and the singer herself, the song was released on 20 July 2018 through Universal Music as the first single from the singer's debut album Akelarre, released in May 2019. The song is certified three times platinum in Spain for selling over 120,000 copies. A remix of the song featuring Joey Montana and Charly Black was released on 7 December 2018.

== Background ==
In November 2017, the Granada-born Miriam Doblas, known as "Mimi", was evicted from the ninth edition of the Spanish talent competition Operación Triunfo at the Gala 3. Since then, Doblas began participating in different projects to boost her singing career. In the first quarter of 2018 it was confirmed that she had signed with Universal Music. In April of that same year, rumors circulated about a possible musical group made up of Doblas and three more of her teammates from the contest, however, "it was an idea that was put on the table as Mimi put Lola Indigo previously, but each one shot for what she wanted to do".

The Lola Indigo project was finally announced through the social networks of Doblas in June 2018 as: "a project directly linked to dance where each song written is intended for the movement, it would not make sense without a group of dancers to represent it. That's not just Mimi. This is Lola Indigo", implying that Lola Indigo would be a musical group where Doblas would be the vocalist along with three or four dancers who would accompany their songs. On July 2, the name of Lola Indigo's first single was announced in the same way. During the third week of July, the other members of the group were announced. The cover of "Ya no quiero na" was unveiled on July 18 through Mimi's social media.

== Critical reception ==
"Ya no quiero na" has been rated a hit, being one of the songs with the greatest impact of those produced by former Operación Triunfo 2017 contestants in the field of music. The press agency Europa Press called the song addictive, as well as Vibes of Silence who defined it as "a total hymn for this summer".

== Commercial performance ==
"Ya no quiero na" debuted at number one on the iTunes song sales chart on its premiere day and stayed there for more than three consecutive days. In the first 24 hours since its premiere, it was viewed more than a million times on the YouTube platform. Three days after its premiere, "Ya No Quiero Ná" already accumulated 2.5 million views on YouTube and 750,000 streams on Spotify while continuing to stay at number one trend on YouTube Spain. Already a week after its premiere, it debuted at the top of Spotify's list of the most viral with more than 2 million streams as well as 5 million on YouTube. In August 2018, he achieved gold record and was certified platinum a month later.

== Music video ==
The video clip was released on YouTube on 20 July 2018. The music video for the song was filmed in the Juan Carlos I Park in Madrid, Spain.

== Charts ==
Weekly chart performance for "Ya no quiero ná"
Chart (2018)	Peak position
Spain (Promusicae)	3

=== Year-end charts ===
2018 year-end chart performance for "Ya no quiero ná"
Chart (2018)	Position
Spain (PROMUSICAE)	34

== Certifications ==
Certifications and sales for "Ya no quiero ná"
Region	Certification	Certified units/sales
Spain (Promusicae)	2× Platinum	80,000^{‡}
^{‡} Sales+streaming figures based on certification alone.

== Release history ==
Release dates for "Ya no quiero ná"
Region	Date	Format	Label
Various	20 July 2018	CD; digital download; streaming	Universal
Spain	6 December 2019	LP	Universal
