= Akelarre (Lola Índigo album) =

Studio album by Lola Índigo
- Released: 17 May 2019
- Recorded: February 2018 – 2019
- Genre: Pop
- Length: 30:36
- Language: Spanish
- Label: Universal Music Spain

Lola Índigo chronology
| Akelarre (2019) | La Niña (2021) |

Singles from Akelarre
- 1. "Ya No Quiero Ná" Released: 20 July 2018; 2. "Mujer Bruja" Released: 21 December 2018; 3. "Maldición" Released: 26 April 2019

Akelarre is the debut album by Spanish singer and dancer Lola Índigo. The album was released on 17 May 2019 through Universal Music in its subdivision in Spain. Akelarre contains musical collaborations with Mala Rodríguez and Nabález between others. Graphic design was made by Luis Valverde and photography by Victoria Gómez. The album was produced by Yera, J Blunt, Bruno Valverde and Red Mojo among others.

== Background ==
After the ninth season of the television program Operación Triunfo in February 2018, the future of Indigo (at that time known as Mimi) was uncertain as she did believe she would have the same career prospects as prior contestants of the series. In June 2018 she announced her artistic name change to Lola Indigo. On 20 July 2018, the singer's first single, "Ya No Quiero Ná", was released to digital platforms, debuting at number three on the Spanish singles chart. After being named "the best single from an ex-contestant of Operación Triunfo 2017", Universal Music Spain expanded her recording contract in order to release a studio album for 2019.

After the artist's second single, "Mujer Bruja" was released in December 2018, in collaboration with the Spanish rapper Mala Rodríguez, the theme of witchcraft began to be widely used by the singer in her social media profiles. Indigo revealed the name of the album during her appearance on the singing program La Mejor Canción Jamás Cantada on 15 March 2019. There she said that it would be released in spring, most likely at the end of the month of April. On 30 April, the singer announced the cover, tracklist and release date of her first album on her social networks.

== Promotion ==
=== Singles ===
Indigo announced the release of her first single on 2 July 2018, eighteen days before its release on music platforms. Praised by critics and the public, "Ya No Quiero Ná" was promoted by appearances at festivals such as the Coca-Cola Music Experience as well as on television programs Operación Triunfo and Viva la Vida. The song debuted in third place on the Spanish sales list, this being its highest position.

At the end of October 2018, the grenadine announced that she would sing the unpublished song "Mujer Bruja" on her Indigo Tour, which would begin in November of that same year in Granada and toured various Spanish cities during the rest of the year and early next year. This second single, in collaboration with Mala Rodríguez, was released to the music market on 21 December of that same year. Promoted on TV shows like Fama, a bailar, the single managed to rank sixth on the charts sales as well as being certified platinum in Spain. Through her respective social networks, Lola Indigo announced in April 2019 that the third single "Maldición", in collaboration with the Colombian rapper Lalo Ebratt, would be released on 26 April of that same year. She reported that this would be the last single before the release of the full album. After 10 weeks charting, it managed to be certified gold after selling more than 20,000 copies.

=== Promotional singles ===
After leaving the Operación Triunfo academy in 2018, she returned as one of the most influential singers on the Spanish music scene to be the mentor of the contestants of the ninth edition of the dance-focused talent show. She returned as such and, in addition, with a theme under the arm for the headline of the new season of the contest, "Fuerte". Released on 22 January 2019, "Fuerte" was the first single from the program's compilation album as well as the first promotional single from Akelarre. The song was in the top 50 of the best-selling songs in Spain the week of its release. "Fuerte" was promoted on talk shows such as Late Motiv or La Resistencia of Movistar + as well as on the program of which it is the main theme.

On the third day of April 2019, the singer announced via her social networks "El Humo", the main theme of the soundtrack of the Mediaset movie Lo Dejo Cuando Quiera. The theme was released seven days after its announcement as well as its video clip. The latter had the participation of the Fame contestants, to dance 2019 and was premiered live on the final of Gran Hermano Duo.

=== Tour ===
The "Akelarre Tour" began at the FIBES Conference Centre in Seville on 4 May 2019 and ended on 30 November in Girona. Indigo was scheduled to perform her first solo arena show at the WiZink Center in Madrid on 2 May titled "Akelarre: La Noche de las Brujas" which had to be postponed to 29 November due to the 2019-20 coronavirus pandemic.

== Commercial performance ==
"Akelarre" was released in streaming and digital download platforms as well as a CD on 17 May 2019. The album debuted at the top of the PROMUSICAE album chart and has over 100 million streams on Spotify. Due to its high commercial demand, the album was released in vinyl format on 6 September 2019.

== Track listing ==
Akelarre track listing
| No. | Title | Length |
|---|---|---|
| 1. | "Mujer bruja" (with Mala Rodriguez) | 3:22 |
| 2. | "Maldición" (with Lalo Ebratt) | 3:08 |
| 3. | "Inocente" (with the Rudeboyz) | 2:57 |
| 4. | "Subliminal" (with Maikel Delcalle and the Rudeboyz) | 2:58 |
| 5. | "Fuerte" | 3:03 |
| 6. | "El Humo" (from the film Lo Dejo Cuando Quiera) | 2:46 |
| 7. | "No se toca" | 2:32 |
| 8. | "Amor veneno" (with Nabález) | 3:23 |
| 9. | "Ya no quiero ná" | 3:12 |
| 10. | "Game Over" | 3:15 |
| Total length: | | 30:36 |

== Charts ==
=== Weekly charts ===
Weekly chart performance of Akelarre
| Chart (2019) | Peak position |
|---|---|
| Spanish Albums (Promusicae) | 1 |

=== Year-end charts ===
Year-end chart performance for Akelarre
| Chart (2019) | Position |
|---|---|
| Spanish Albums (PROMUSICAE) | 33 |

== Release history ==
Release history of Akelarre
| Region | Date | Format | Label |
|---|---|---|---|
| Various | 17 May 2019 | CD; digital download; streaming | Universal |
| Spain | 6 September 2019 | LP | Universal |
