= Cauty =

Puerto Rican reggaeton singer

- Birth name: Christian Daniel Mojica Blanco
- Born: Puerto Rico
- Origin: San Lorenzo, Puerto Rico
- Genres: Reggaeton, urban music
- Occupation(s): Singer, songwriter, producer
- Instrument: Vocals

Christian Daniel Mojica Blanco, known as Cauty, is a Puerto Rican reggaeton singer, songwriter, and producer born in Caguas, Puerto Rico, and raised in San Lorenzo.

== Career ==
Cauty garnered fame thanks to songs such as "Lola" "Lloras", and "Ta To Gucci", which received a remix with Darell, Brytiago, Rafa Pabón, Chencho Corleone, and Cosculluela. The song garnered over 100 million views in YouTube. He has collaborated with musicians such as Maximus Wel, Guaynaa, Jowell & Randy, Farruko, and Ñejo. Cauty was inspired by Don Omar, Farruko, Arcángel, Daddy Yankee, Héctor el Father and Héctor Lavoe. He has also preferred not to talk about themes like drugs or crime, and has stated he makes music to "hang out".

Cauty's fame rose to an all time high on August 11, 2022 after a publicity stunt he held in a local gas station in the Baldrich neighborhood in Hato Rey in which he gave gasoline at 25.7 cents per liter for regular gas, and 45.7 cents per liter for premium gas.
