= Beret (singer) =

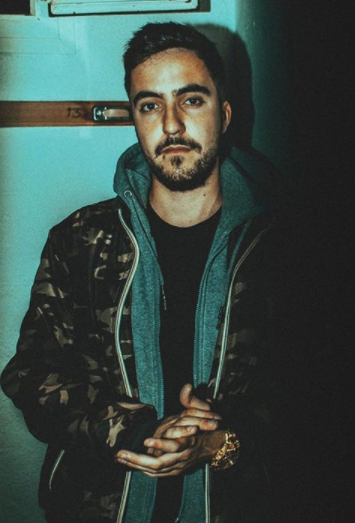
- Beret (2018)

Background information
- Born: Francisco Javier Álvarez Beret; July 2, 1996 (age 29); Seville, Spain
- Origin: Seville, Andalusia, Spain
- Genres: Pop
- Occupation: Singer
- Years active: 2013 – present
- Label: Warner Music

Francisco Javier Álvarez Beret (born 2 July 1996), better known by the mononym Beret is a Spanish pop singer.

He was born in Seville, and started early publishing homemade recordings on the internet. In 2018, he signed with the Warner Music Group. Gaining popularity in Spain, he made a leap also in Latin America, through a collaboration with the Colombian singer Sebastián Yatra in the single "Vuelve".

== Discography ==
=== Albums ===
- 2015: Efímero
- 2015: Vértigo
- 2016: Ápices
- 2019: Prisma
- 2022: Resiliencia

=== Singles ===
| Title | Year | Peak positions |
| Title | Year | SPA |
|---|---|---|
| "Vuelve" | 2017 | 66 |
| "Esencial" | 2017 | 84 |
| "Lo siento" | 2018 | 8 |
| "Vuelve" (with Sebastián Yatra) | 2018 | 26* |
| "Ojalá" | 2018 | 88 |
| "Te echo de menos" | 2018 | 4 |
| "Me llama" | 2019 | 15 |
| "Me vas a ver" | 2019 | 8 |
| "Si por mi fuera" | 2019 | 3 |
| "Llegará" | 2019 | 94 |
| "Sueño" | 2020 | 25 |
| "Aún me amas" | 2020 | 34 |
| "Cómo te va?" | 2020 | 17 |
| "Estupidez" | 2020 | 51 |
| "Tú y Yo" (with Omar Montes) | 2022 | 77 |
| "Diablo" (with Estopa) | 2022 | 25 |

*Also peaked in Argentina (#31), Colombia (#45) and Ecuador (#96)

=== Other songs ===
| Title | Year | Peak positions |
| Title | Year | SPN |
|---|---|---|
| "Llegará" | 2017 | 94 |
| "Mirando a la luna" (with Reik) | 2022 | 97 |
