= Mala Rodríguez =

Spanish rapper (born 1979)

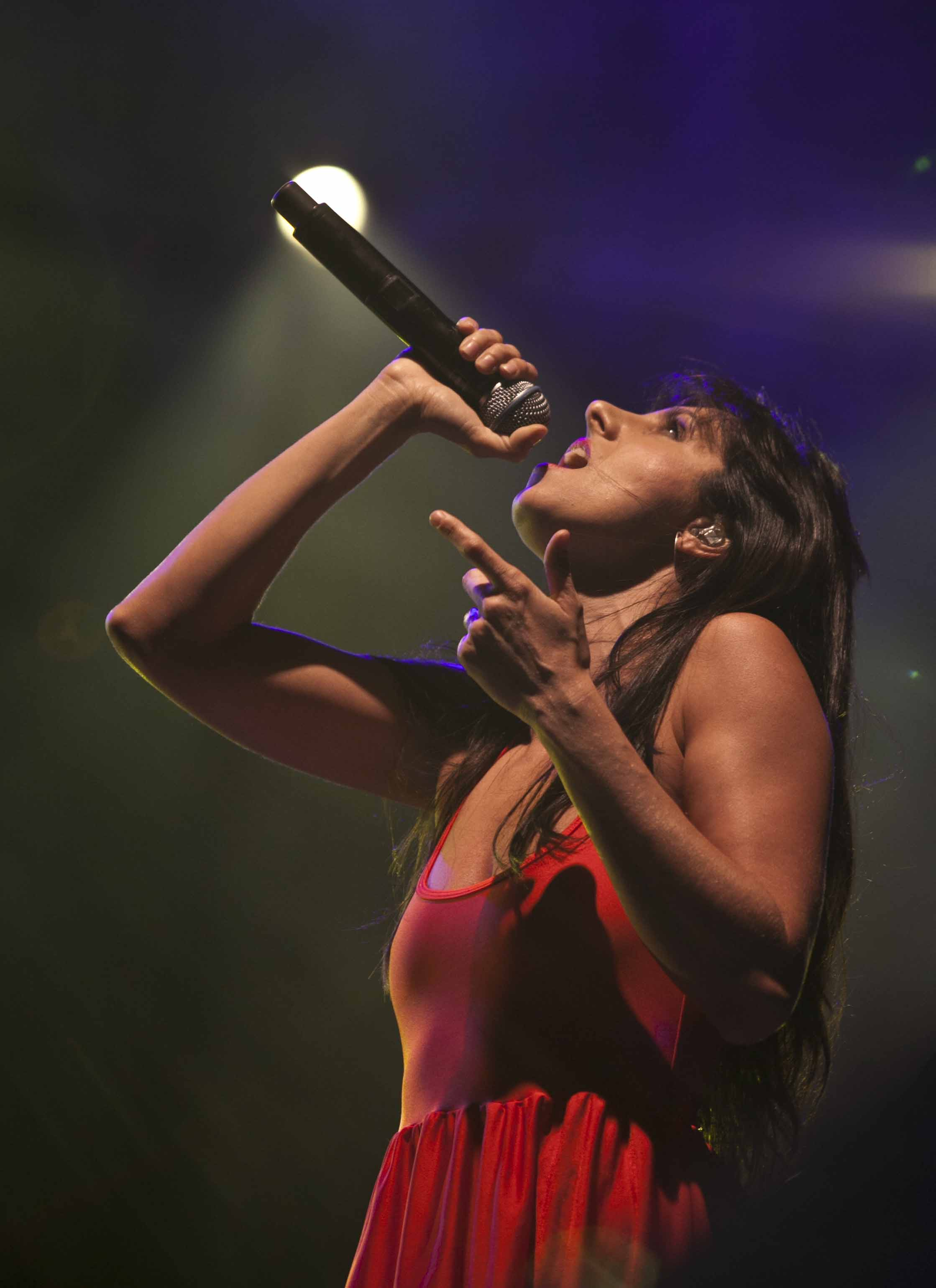
- Rodríguez in 2012

Background information
- Also known as: La Mala Rodríguez
- Born: María Rodríguez Garrido; February 13, 1979 (age 47); Jérez de la Frontera, Cádiz, Spain
- Origin: Seville, Spain
- Genres: Alternative hip hop; Latin rap; reggaeton; flamenco
- Occupations: Rapper; singer
- Instrument: Vocals
- Years active: 1998–present
- Label: Universal Music
- Spouse(s): Reynor Hernandez (2005-2010); Juan Antonio Garcia juanpurosonido (2016-2022)

María Rodríguez Garrido (born February 13, 1979), known as Mala Rodríguez, is a Spanish Latin hip hop rapper and singer based in Barcelona. She appeared as a judge on Spain's La Voz prior to releasing her first album in seven years, Mala, in May 2020. Rodríguez released her memoir, Cómo ser Mala, in June 2021. Rodríguez is also the first female artist to win both Best Urban Album and Best Urban Song at the Latin Grammy Awards, as well as the first urban artist to win Spain's National Music Award.

== Early life ==
Maria Rodríguez was born in Jérez de la Frontera (Cádiz) on February 13, 1979. She grew up in Seville and became involved with the city's thriving hip-hop scene as a teenager. The daughter of a hairdresser in an Andalusian family, she describes herself as being from a working-class family, saying, "My mother and I are both young, and all I know is that my family experienced hunger back then [her parents' times], and that sticks with you. I didn't grow up with luxury, but I never missed a meal either." At age seventeen, she performed onstage for the first time, and adopted the stage name La Mala.

== Musical career ==
She rose to prominence in the late 1990s alongside fellow Sevillian hip hop acts such as La Gota Que Colma, SFDK, and La Alta Escuela. After she adopted the stage name La Mala, she appeared on La Gota Que Colma's album Mordiendo el Micro on the songs "No Hay Rebaja", and "Dando Guerra". She also appeared on SFDK's Siempre Fuertes and La Alta Escuela's En Pie de Vuelo on the song "Espectáculo en la Gancha". She made her solo debut with A Jierro/Toma la Traca, a maxi-single released by Zona Bruta in 1999. The song was originally planned for release by Zeroporsiento, a Sevillian label for which she had recorded the tracks. In 2000, she signed to Universal Music Spain, and released her full-length debut album, Lujo Ibérico.

In 2001, her song "Tengo lo que tú quieres" was part of the BSO of the Spanish movie Sex and Lucia.

Her second album, Alevosía, featured the single, "La Niña". The song gained notability when its controversial music video was banned from Spanish TV because of its depiction of a young female drug dealer.

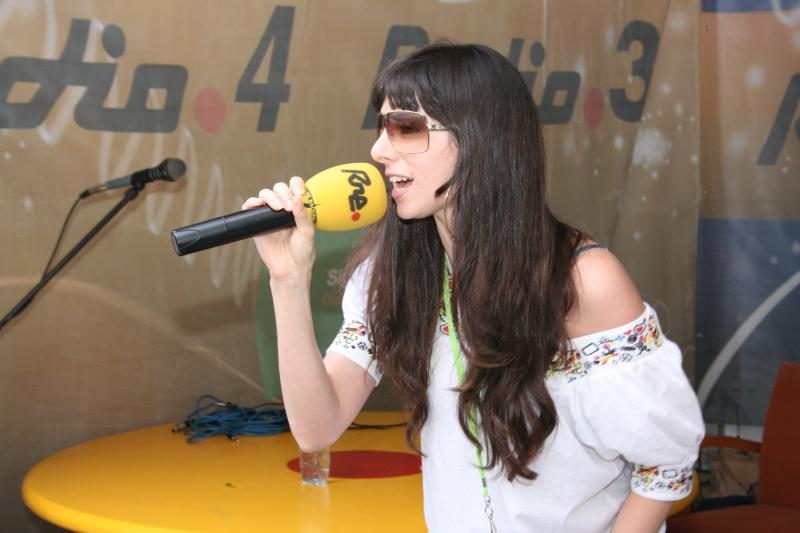
Rodríguez at Sónar, 2007.

On the soundtrack of the film Fast & Furious her single "Volveré", from the Malamarismo album, was featured.

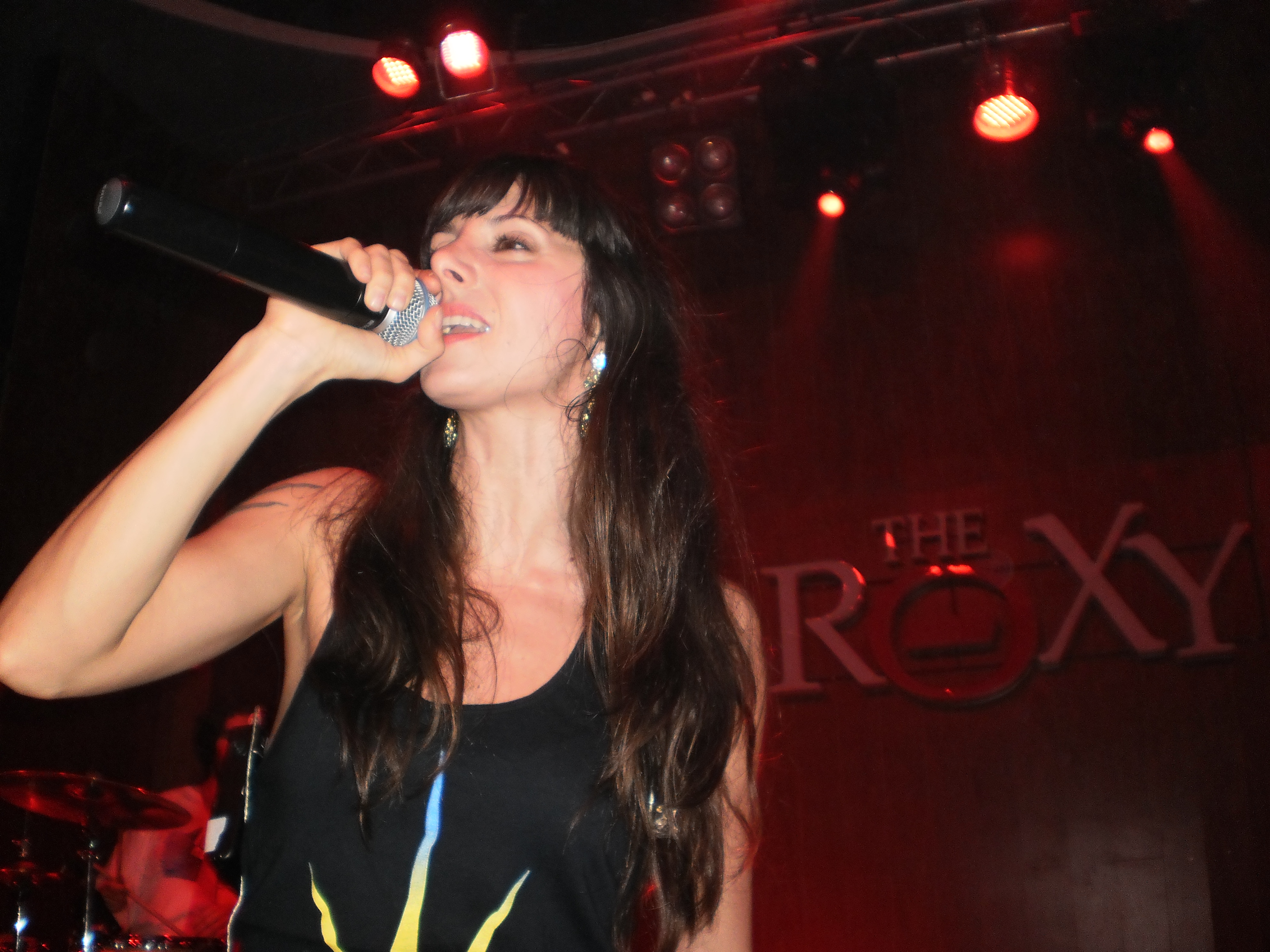
Rodríguez in Córdoba, Argentina, 2008.

In 2008, Rodriguez was invited to join Julieta Venegas for her MTV Unplugged performance singing the song "Eres para mí".

She performed with Maroon 5, Björk and LMFAO at the Festival Imperial in the Autódromo La Guácima racetrack in Alajuela, Costa Rica in March 2012.

In April 2013 she revealed on her Facebook page that her album, Bruja, would be released on June 18. On September 12, 2013, she went back to Costa Rica.

In 2015, Mala Rodriguez was one of the many artists featured on President Barack Obama’s Summer Spotify playlist.

NPR named one of her earlier singles "Yo Marco El Minuto" as one of the 200 Greatest Songs by 21st Century Women.

After a four-year hiatus, Mala released the single "Gitanas" on July 6, 2018. Pitchfork called her vocals "bold and unflinching, when she boldly asks 'Quién me protege?' ("Who will protect me?") you can almost feel the ground quake beneath her feet. Mala already knows the answer to her question. Without missing a beat, she cries out, "Yo!" ("Me!"), daring anyone to doubt her." In 2019 Rodriguez became the first urban artist to win Spain's National Music Award and was a judge on Spain's La Voz (The Voice) leading up to her first album in seven years, Mala, released in May 2020. Rodriguez released her memoir Cómo ser Mala in June 2021.

== Discography ==
=== Albums ===
Year	Album	Peak positions	Certification
Year	Album	SPN	Certification
2000	Lujo Ibérico	—	Gold
2003	Alevosía	—	Gold
2007	Malamarismo	10	
2010	Dirty Bailarina	11	
2013	Bruja	11	
2020	Mala		
2024	Un Mundo Raro		

=== EPs ===
Year	Album	Peak positions	Certification
Year	Album	SPN	Certification
2003	La Niña/Amor y Respeto	—	

=== Singles ===
Year	Song	Peak positions	Album
Year	Song	SPN	Album
2000	"Tengo un trato"	3	Lujo Ibérico
2003	"La niña"	4	Alevosía
2006	"Por la noche"	1	Malamarismo
2010	"No pidas perdón"	30	Dirty Bailarina
2018	"Usted" (with Juan Magán)	4	
2018	"Mujer bruja" (with Lola Indigo)	6	
2019	"Tenamoras" (with Dellafuente)	97	
2026	"100" (with Boy Wonder and Charlee Way)	―	La Liga Femenina

=== Featured in ===
Year	Song	Peak positions	Album
Year	Song	SPN	Album
2009	"Bajo Otra Luz" (Nelly Furtado feat. Mala Rodríguez)	―	Mi Plan
2018	"Caprichosa" (Beatriz Luengo feat. Mala Rodríguez)	57	Non album release
2018	"Contigo" (Stylo G feat. Mala Rodríguez)	―	Non album release

== Collaborations ==
- La Gota que Colma – "Mordiendo el micro" (1998)
- SFDK – "Siempre fuertes" (1999)
- El Imperio – "Monopolio" (1999)
- La Alta Escuela – "Espectaculo en la cancha" (1999)
- Jota Mayúscula – "Hombre negro soltero busca..." (2000)
- Ygryega – "XXL" (2000)
- Poison – "El Poeta de Mi Barrio" (2001)
- Dnoe – "Que Piensan Las Mujeres 1: Personal" (2002)
- La Super K – "Agüita" (2002)
- VV.AA. – "Laboratorio Hip Hop CD1" (2003)
- VV.AA. – "Flow Latino (Habana – Madrid)" (2003)
- Jota Mayúscula – "Una vida Xtra" (2004)
- R de Rumba – "Fabricante" (2004)
- Full Nelson – "Confía en mí" (2005)
- VV.AA. – "Bien Sobre Mal Vol.3" (2005)
- Akon – "Locked Up (reedición)" (2005)
- Vico C – "Vamonos Po' Encima" (2005)
- Upsurt – "Втората цедка" (2006)
- Kultama – "Nacional e importación" (2006)
- Antonio Carmona – "Vengo venenoso" (2006)
- Griffi – "Los Impresentables" (2006)
- Calle 13 – "Mala suerte con el 13" (2007)
- Bajofondo – "El Anden" (2007)
- Julieta Venegas – "Tiempo Pa`Pensa" Malamarismo (2007)
- A.B. Quintanilla III y Los Kumbia All Starz and Vicentico – "Vuelve" (2008)
- Jota Mayúscula – "Juega con el monstruo"
- Jota Mayúscula – "Como un títere"
- Mentenguerra – "Por La Noche"
- Nelly Furtado and Julieta Venegas – "Bajo Otra Luz" (2009)
- Diego Torres – "Mirar Atrás" (2010)
- Sebastian Yepes – "De Lo Oscuro a Lo Puro" (2011)
- Romeo Santos – "Magia Negra" (2011)
- Kinky – "Negro Día" (2011)
- SOJA – "Like It Used To" (2014)
- El Guincho – "Comix" (2016)
- Ibeyi – "Me Voy" (2017)
- Beatriz Luengo – "Caprichosa" (2018)
- Juan Magán – "Usted" (2018)
- Stylo G – "Contigo" (2018)
- Dellafuente – "Tenamoras" (2019)
- Denise Rosethal – "Agua Segura" (2019)
- Dyce - "Solito (remix)" (2023)
