= Lalo Ebratt =

Colombian reggaeton singer (born 1993)

- Born: Eduardo Mario Ebratt Troncoso; February 3, 1993 (age 33); Santa Marta, Colombia
- Occupation: Singer
- Instrument: Vocals
- Years active: 2017–present
- Labels: Warner Music Mexico; Universal; RedSnapperMusic
- Formerly of: Trapical Minds

Eduardo Mario Ebratt Troncoso (born February 3, 1993, in Santa Marta, Colombia), better known by his stage name Lalo Ebratt, is a Colombian reggaeton singer.

== Career ==
He first came to public attention as a member of Trapical Minds, a latin hip-hop project put together by Colombian label RedSnapperMusic that also features singers Yera and Skinny Happy, before launching a solo career.

He is best known for his viral hit single "Mocca", released on April 27, 2018. The music video has garnered over 200 million views. A remixed version of "Mocca" featuring Colombian singer J Balvin was released on October 3, 2018.

== Discography ==
=== Albums ===
- Dos Mil Treinta y Pico (2022)

=== Singles ===
As lead artist

Year	Song	Peak positions
Year	Song	COL
2018	"TBT" (with Yera)	—
2018	"Loca Como Tú" (with Skinny Happy)	—
2018	"Mocca" (with Trapical)	1
2018	"Mocca" (remix) (with Trapical featuring J Balvin)	1
2018	"El Vecino" (with Sharlene and Trapical Minds)	—
2019	"Malidición" (with Lola Indigo)	80
2019	"Amor A Primera Vista" (with Los Ángeles Azules and Belinda featuring Horacio Palencia)	5
2019	"Indeciso" (with J Balvin and Reik)	14
2020	"La Gatita" (with Tainy)	—

As featured artist

Year	Song	Peak positions
Year	Song	COL
2018	"Baby Girl" (Mario Bautista featuring Lalo Ebratt)	3
2019	"La Plata" (Juanes featuring Lalo Ebratt)	—
2019	"Fresa" (Tini featuring Lalo Ebratt)	—
2020	"TBT (Remix)" (Sebastián Yatra, Rauw Alejandro and Manuel Turizo featuring Cosculluela Lalo Ebratt, Llane and Dálmata)	
