= La Voz Kids (Spanish TV series) season 8 =

La Voz Kids
- Season 8
- Hosted by: Eva González; Juanra Bonet (backstage host)
- Coaches: David Bisbal; Rosario Flores; Aitana; Sebastián Yatra
- Winner: Rubén Franco
- Winning coach: Sebastián Yatra
- Runner-up: Lucía Baizán

Release
- Original network: Antena 3
- Original release: 15 April – 8 July 2023

Season chronology
- ← Previous; Season 7 Next → Season 9

The eighth season of La Voz Kids premiered on 15 April 2023 on Antena 3. This season, David Bisbal, Aitana, and Sebastián Yatra all reprised their roles as coaches from the previous season. Rosario Flores returned as a coach for her seventh season after a one-season absence, replacing Pablo López. However, Pablo López filled in for David Bisbal for the first four episodes of the blind auditions to select artists for David's team. Eva González and Juanra Bonet remained as the host of the program.

On 8 July, Rubén Franco was announced as the winner of this season, marking Sebastián Yatra's first and only win as a coach. Also, this was the second occurrence where as stolen artist won the entire season (Franco was originally from David Bisbal's team before he joined Team Yatra), following Irene Gil in season 5.

== Coaches and Hosts ==
La Voz Kids Season 8 Coaches and Hosts

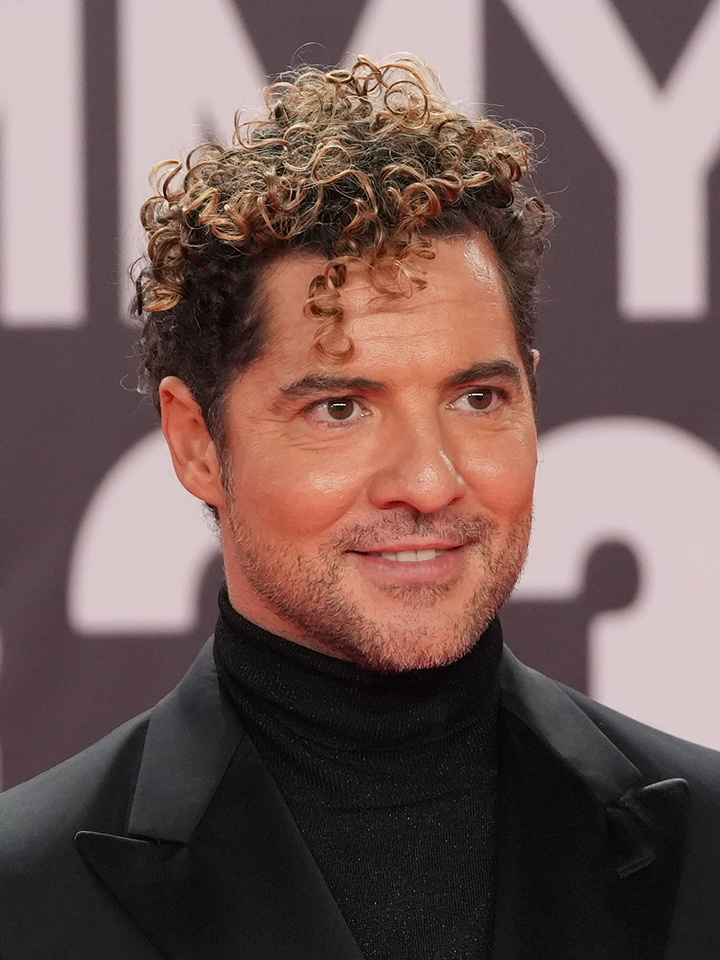
David Bisbal

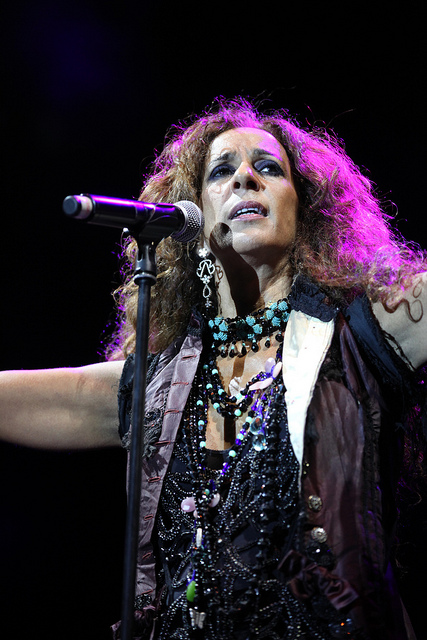
Rosario Flores

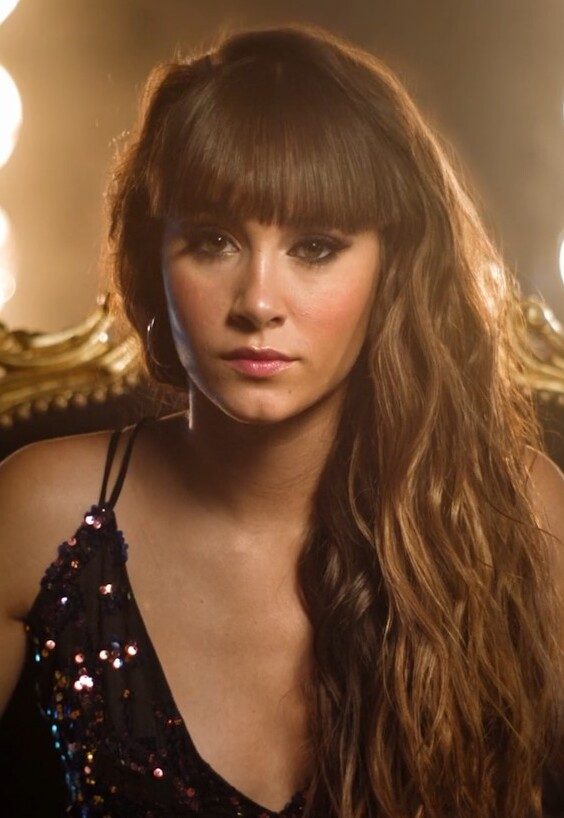
Aitana

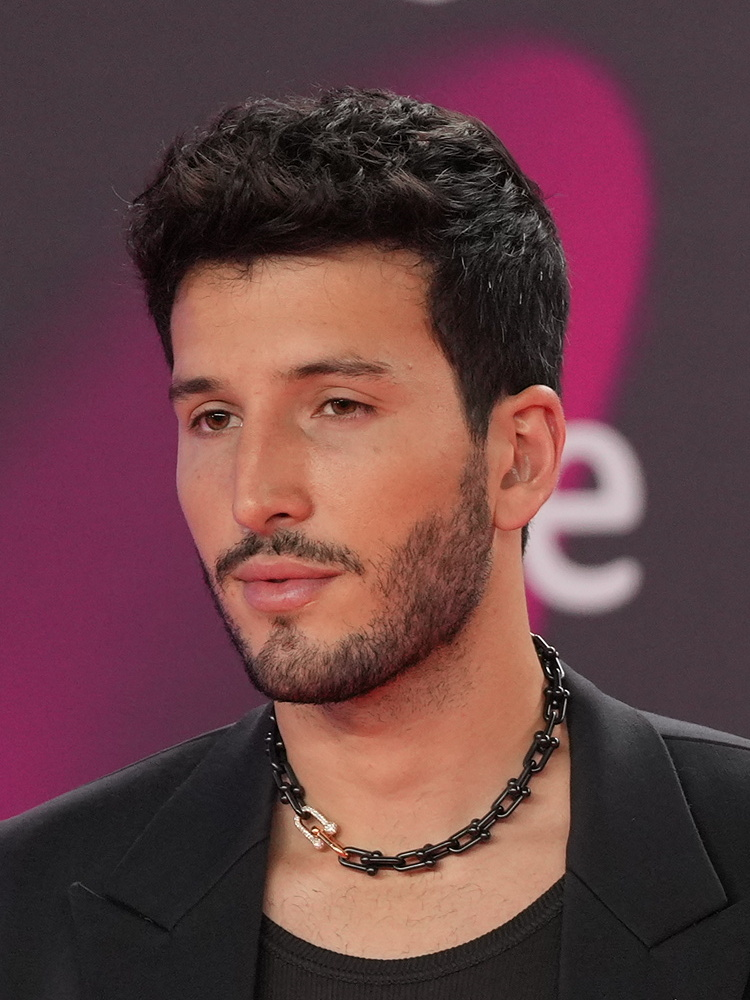
Sebastián Yatra

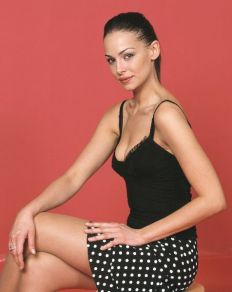
Eva González

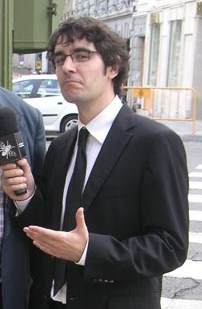
Juanra Bonet

In this season, three out of the four coaches from the previous season remained as coaches. David Bisbal returned for his seventh season as a coach, & Aitana and Sebastián Yatra both returned for their second seasons as coaches. Rosario Flores returned after one-season absence on the panel, replacing Pablo López. However, Pablo López filled in for David Bisbal for the first four blind audition episodes.

Eva González and Juanra Bonet continued hosting on the program.

== Teams ==
- Winner
- Runner-up
- Third Place
- Fourth Place
- Eliminated in the Finale
- Eliminated in the Semi-final
- Eliminated in the Knockouts
- Stolen in the Battles
- Eliminated in the Battles

Coaches	Top 60 Artists					
David Bisbal						
David Bisbal	Lucía Baizán	Adrián Campos	Nicole González	Aitana González	Daniela Montes	Emma García
David Bisbal	Alicia Herrera	~~Amanda Sánchez~~	~~Martina García~~	~~Rubén Franco~~	~~Paula Román~~	Barbare Makhatadze
David Bisbal	Cristina Cebrián	Isona Marmol	Miguel Sánchez	Ismael Perez-Gil	Andriy Golovnyuk	
Rosario Flores						
Rosario Flores	Amanda Sánchez	Zhanel Ali	Alfonso Ortiz	Paula Román	Sara Pañero	Érika Martín
Rosario Flores	Daniela Marinho	~~Dulce Barroso~~	Cecilia García	Natalia Marín	Lucía Schibler	Aleix Ortiz
Rosario Flores	Sofía Mourilo	Jiména Benítez	Ana Lucía Cuarteto	Noa Cánovas	Fran López	
Aitana						
Aitana	Manuela de la Fuente	Álvaro Tadeo	Juanvi Fuentes	Ana Valero	Alejandra España	Dulce Barroso
Aitana	Martina García	~~Lucía Fernández~~	~~Alicia Herrera~~	Jaime de la Vega	Hugo González	Dylan Santiago
Aitana	Blanca González	Paula Villarroya	Lucía Cubilla	Alex Barrenechea	Nacho López	
Sebastián Yatra						
Sebastián Yatra	Rubén Franco	Béty Dumitru	Samuel Marín	Lucía Fernández	Molly & Shelly	Joel Gómez
Sebastián Yatra	Lennon Jon Sharp	~~Aitana González~~	Adrián Cordón	Lucía Plaza	María Casillas	Andrea Naya
Sebastián Yatra	Ibone Sardón	Aroa Díaz	Nina Cruz	Martina Ramos	Layna Fernández	
Note: Italicized names are stolen contestants (names struck through within former teams).

== Blind Auditions ==
Each coach needs to recruit 15 young artists into their teams. Like last season, each coach has three blocks. The blocked coach's chair won't turn around. Two coaches can be blocked in one audition. At the end of the blind auditions, Aitana didn't use her third block, and David Bisbal (or Pablo López) only used their block once.

✔	Coach pressed "QUIERO TU VOZ" button
	Artist elected to join this coach's team
	Artist defaulted to this coach's team
	Artist eliminated as no coach pressing "QUIERO TU VOZ" button
✘	Coach pressed "QUIERO TU VOZ" button, but was blocked by another coach from getting the artist
	Blocked by David ^{1}; Blocked by Rosario; Blocked by Aitana; Blocked by Yatra

Episode	Order	Artist	Age	Song	Coach's and artist's choices			
Episode	Order	Artist	Age	Song	David ^{1}	Rosario	Aitana	Yatra
Episode 1 (15 April)	1	Molly & Shelly	11/9	"Who's Lovin' You"	✘	✔	✘	✔
Episode 1 (15 April)	2	Andriy Golovnyuk	9	"Billie Jean"	✔	✔	✘	✔
Episode 1 (15 April)	3	Alicia Herrera	15	"Nana Triste"	✘	✔	✔	✔
Episode 1 (15 April)	4	Rubén Franco	11	"La Niña De Fuego"	✔	✔	✔	✔
Episode 1 (15 April)	5	Samuel Marín	9	"La Llorona"	✔	✔	✔	✔
Episode 1 (15 April)	6	Laura Cuenca	15	"Your Power"	—	—	—	—
Episode 1 (15 April)	7	Dulce Barroso	9	"Qué Bonito"	✔	✔	✔	✔
Episode 1 (15 April)	8	Aitana González	15	"His Eye is on the Sparrow"	—	✔	✔	✔
Episode 1 (15 April)	9	Paula Villarroya	7	"Que Canten los Niños"	✔	✔	✔	—
Episode 1 (15 April)	10	Juan Doblado	9	"Manos de Tijera"	—	—	—	—
Episode 1 (15 April)	11	Manuela de la Fuente	14	"I Will Always Love You"	—	✔	✔	✔
Episode 1 (15 April)	12	Paula García	10	"Fight Song"	—	—	—	—
Episode 1 (15 April)	13	Sara Pañero	9	"The Best"	—	✔	—	✔
Episode 2 (22 April)
Episode 2 (22 April)	1	Adrián Campos	11	"Ángel Caído"	✔	✔	✔	✔
Episode 2 (22 April)	2	Layna Fernández	10	"Der Höller Rache"	—	✔	—	✔
Episode 2 (22 April)	3	Alex Barrenechea	8	"A Million Dreams"	—	✔	✔	✘
Episode 2 (22 April)	4	Lucía Baizán	14	"Que Siempre Sea Verano"	✔	✔	✔	✘
Episode 2 (22 April)	5	Luisana Meléndez	15	"Eres Tú"	—	—	—	—
Episode 2 (22 April)	6	Joel Gómez	15	"Yellow"	—	—	✔	✔
Episode 2 (22 April)	7	Martina Ramos	10	"Easy on Me"	—	—	—	✔
Episode 2 (22 April)	8	Gabriela Caballero	10	"Traitor"	—	—	—	—
Episode 2 (22 April)	9	Noa Cánovas	13	"Over the Rainbow"	—	✔	—	—
Episode 2 (22 April)	10	Carolina Moreno	10	"Drivers License"	—	—	—	—
Episode 2 (22 April)	11	Zhanel Ali	12	"Hurt"	—	✔	✔	✔
Episode 2 (22 April)	12	Fran López	14	"La Despedida"	—	✔	—	—
Episode 2 (22 April)	13	Dilan Quiles	11	"City of Stars"	—	—	—	—
Episode 2 (22 April)	14	Nicole González	13	"Abandono"	✔	✔	✔	—
Episode 3 (29 April)
Episode 3 (29 April)	1	Andrea Naya	11	"Aunque Tú No lo Sepas"	—	—	✔	✔
Episode 3 (29 April)	2	Álvaro Tadeo	13	"The Way You Look Tonight"	—	✔	✔	✘
Episode 3 (29 April)	3	Ana Valero	12	"Natural Woman"	✔	✔	✔	✔
Episode 3 (29 April)	4	Ibone Sardón	14	"The Sound of Music"	—	—	—	✔
Episode 3 (29 April)	5	María Fernández	13	"Tejiendo Alas"	—	—	—	—
Episode 3 (29 April)	6	Daniela Montes	14	"All I Want"	✔	✔	✔	✔
Episode 3 (29 April)	7	Felipe Lladó	7	"Mira Frente a Ti"	—	—	—	—
Episode 3 (29 April)	8	Adrián Cordón	8	"Vida de Rico"	—	—	—	✔
Episode 3 (29 April)	9	Aleix Ortiz	12	"Still Loving You"	—	✔	—	—
Episode 3 (29 April)	10	Noa Memba	13	"I'll Be There"	—	—	—	—
Episode 3 (29 April)	11	Ana Lucía Cuarteto	14	"California Dreamin'"	—	✔	✘	—
Episode 3 (29 April)	12	Adriana Castillo	13	"Shape of You"	—	—	—	—
Episode 3 (29 April)	13	Nacho López	14	"El Sitio de Mi Recreo"	—	—	✔	—
Episode 4 (6 May)
Episode 4 (6 May)	1	Lennon Jon Sharp	13	"I Don't Want to Miss a Thing"	—	—	—	—
Episode 4 (6 May)	2	Lucía Plaza	15	"Hallelujah"	—	—	—	✔
Episode 4 (6 May)	3	Emma García	8	"Warrior"	✔	✔	✔	—
Episode 4 (6 May)	4	Alfonso Ortiz	14	"Mía"	—	✔	—	—
Episode 4 (6 May)	5	Adrián Gimeno	15	"Never Be Alone"	—	—	—	—
Episode 4 (6 May)	6	Amanda Sánchez	15	"La Mudanza"	✔	✔	—	—
Episode 4 (6 May)	7	María Casillas	13	"Drivers License"	—	—	—	✔
Episode 4 (6 May)	8	Isona Marmol	12	"Defying Gravity"	✔	—	—	—
Episode 4 (6 May)	9	Lucía Cubilla	14	"Anyone"	—	✔	✔	✔
Episode 4 (6 May)	10	Manuel Romera	12	"Polvo de Mariposas"	—	—	—	—
Episode 4 (6 May)	11	Cecilia García	13	"When I Was Your Man"	—	✔	—	—
Episode 4 (6 May)	12	Alicia Cañas	11	"If I Ain't Got You"	—	—	—	—
Episode 4 (6 May)	13	Ismael Perez-Gil	15	"¿Y cómo es él?"	✔	✔	—	—
Episode 5 (20 May)
Episode 5 (20 May)	1	Barbare Makhatadze	10	"Creep"	✔	✔	✔	✔
Episode 5 (20 May)	2	Natalia Marín	15	"Soñar Contigo"	—	✔	—	—
Episode 5 (20 May)	3	Lucía Fernández	14	"Happier"	✔	✔	✔	✔
Episode 5 (20 May)	4	Ana Téllez	11	"Qué hay más allá"	—	—	—	—
Episode 5 (20 May)	5	Lennon Jon Sharp	13	"Highway to Hell"	✔	✔	✔	✔
Episode 5 (20 May)	6	Irati Ibisate	12	"A Thousand Years"	—	—	—	—
Episode 5 (20 May)	7	Lucía Schibler	8	"Panis angelicus"	✔	✔	—	—
Episode 5 (20 May)	8	Jaime de la Vega	12	"Vas a Quedarte"	✔	✔	✔	—
Episode 5 (20 May)	9	Paula Román	13	"No One Like You"	✔	—	—	—
Episode 5 (20 May)	10	Erika Martín	14	"Amor de San Juan"	✔	✔	—	✔
Episode 5 (20 May)	11	Ruy Martínez-Sellés	11	"A Million Dreams"	—	—	—	—
Episode 5 (20 May)	12	Cristina Cebrián	14	"Hurt"	✔	✔	—	✔
Episode 5 (20 May)	13	Hugo González	11	"Nana del Mediterráneo"	✔	—	✔	✔
Episode 5 (20 May)	14	Sofía Mourilo	12	"Dangerous Woman"	—	✔	—	—
Episode 6 (27 May)
Episode 6 (27 May)	1	Béty Dumitru	13	"Bohemian Rhapsody"	✔	✔	✔	✔
Episode 6 (27 May)	2	Jiména Benítez	15	"Hopelessly Devoted to You"	—	✔	—	—
Episode 6 (27 May)	3	Dylan Santiago	10	"Hymne à l'amour"	—	✔	✔	—
Episode 6 (27 May)	4	Blanca González	14	"Someone You Loved"	—	—	✔	✘
Episode 6 (27 May)	5	Biel Miralles	12	"Delilah"	—	—	—	—
Episode 6 (27 May)	6	Alejandra España	7	"Mañana"	—	—	✔	—
Episode 6 (27 May)	7	Aroa Díaz	12	"Cómo mirarte"	—	—	—	✔
Episode 6 (27 May)	8	Daniela Marinho	10	"Love of My Life"	—	✔	—	—
Episode 6 (27 May)	9	Lucy Soberats	13	"Just Give Me a Reason"	—	Team Full	—	—
Episode 6 (27 May)	10	Martina García	11	"La Rosa"	✔	Team Full	✔	✔
Episode 6 (27 May)	11	Miguel Sánchez	11	"Donde Está la Vida"	✔	Team Full	—	—
Episode 6 (27 May)	12	Rocío Heredia	11	"Vencer al Amor"	Team Full	Team Full	—	—
Episode 6 (27 May)	13	Juanvi Fuentes	11	"No te Pude Retenes"	Team Full	Team Full	✔	✔
Episode 6 (27 May)	14	José Núñez	15	"Take Me to Church"	Team Full	Team Full	Team Full	—
Episode 6 (27 May)	15	Nina Cruz	10	"Aunque no sea contigo"	Team Full	Team Full	Team Full	✔

^{1} Pablo López sat in David's chair to select artists for his team for the first four episodes of the blind auditions.

== Battles ==
The battles commenced 3 June 2023. The coaches can steal two losing artists from other coaches. In addition, coaches' advisors help them on deciding who will be advancing to the next round; Rosa López for Team David, La Mari for Team Rosario, Dani Fernández for Team Aitana, and Rayden for Team Yatra. Contestants who won their battle or were stolen by another coach advanced to the Knockouts.

Battles color key
Artist was chosen by his/her coach to advance to the Knockouts
Artist was stolen by another coach and advanced to the Knockouts
Artist was eliminated

Episode	Coach	Order	Winner	Song	Losers	'Steal' result			
Episode	Coach	Order	Winner	Song	Losers	David	Rosario	Aitana	Yatra
Episode 7 (3 June)	David Bisbal	1	Emma García	"Cry Me Out"	Andriy Golovnyuk	—N/a	—	—	—
Episode 7 (3 June)	David Bisbal	1	Emma García	"Cry Me Out"	Barbare Makhatadze	—N/a	—	—	—
Episode 7 (3 June)	Sebastián Yatra	2	Béty Dumitru	"Ocean"	María Casillas	—	—	—	—N/a
Episode 7 (3 June)	Sebastián Yatra	2	Béty Dumitru	"Ocean"	Aitana González	✔	—	—	—N/a
Episode 7 (3 June)	Aitana	3	Juanvi Fuentes	"La Quiero a Morir"	Dylan Santiago	—	—	—N/a	—
Episode 7 (3 June)	Aitana	3	Juanvi Fuentes	"La Quiero a Morir"	Jaime de la Vega	—	—	—N/a	—
Episode 7 (3 June)	Rosario Flores	4	Daniela Marinho	"Memory"	Noa Cánovas	—	—N/a	—	—
Episode 7 (3 June)	Rosario Flores	4	Daniela Marinho	"Memory"	Lucía Schibler	—	—N/a	—	—
Episode 7 (3 June)	David Bisbal	5	Lucía Baizán	"Olvidé Respirar"	Rubén Franco	—N/a	—	—	✔
Episode 7 (3 June)	David Bisbal	5	Lucía Baizán	"Olvidé Respirar"	Ismael Perez-Gil	—N/a	—	—	—
Episode 7 (3 June)	Rosario Flores	6	Alfonso Ortiz	"Que Nadie"	Ana Lucía Cuarteto	—	—N/a	—	—
Episode 7 (3 June)	Rosario Flores	6	Alfonso Ortiz	"Que Nadie"	Fran López	—	—N/a	—	—
Episode 7 (3 June)	Aitana	7	Ana Valero	"Lovely"	Alicia Herrera	✔	—	—N/a	—
Episode 7 (3 June)	Aitana	7	Ana Valero	"Lovely"	Blanca González	Team full	—	—N/a	—
Episode 7 (3 June)	David Bisbal	8	Daniela Montes	"Born This Way"	Cristina Cebrián	Team full	—	—	—
Episode 7 (3 June)	David Bisbal	8	Daniela Montes	"Born This Way"	Paula Román	Team full	✔	—	—
Episode 7 (3 June)	Sebastián Yatra	9	Molly & Shelly	"Mi Persona Favorita"	Andrea Naya	Team full	—	—	—N/a
Episode 7 (3 June)	Sebastián Yatra	9	Molly & Shelly	"Mi Persona Favorita"	Martina Ramos	Team full	—	—	—N/a
Episode 7 (3 June)	Rosario Flores	10	Sara Pañero	"I Don't Want to Miss a Thing"	Aleix Ortiz	Team full	—N/a	—	—
Episode 7 (3 June)	Rosario Flores	10	Sara Pañero	"I Don't Want to Miss a Thing"	Cecilia García	Team full	—N/a	—	—
Episode 8 (10 June)	Aitana	1	Manuela de la Fuente	"Rise Up"	Lucía Cubilla	Team full	—	—N/a	—
Episode 8 (10 June)	Aitana	1	Manuela de la Fuente	"Rise Up"	Lucía Fernández	Team full	—	—N/a	✔
Episode 8 (10 June)	Sebastián Yatra	2	Samuel Marín	"Te Espero Aquí"	Nina Cruz	Team full	—	—	Team full
Episode 8 (10 June)	Sebastián Yatra	2	Samuel Marín	"Te Espero Aquí"	Adrián Cordón	Team full	—	—	Team full
Episode 8 (10 June)	David Bisbal	3	Adrián Campos	"Ya no Quiero Ser"	Amanda Sánchez	Team full	✔	—	Team full
Episode 8 (10 June)	David Bisbal	3	Adrián Campos	"Ya no Quiero Ser"	Miguel Sánchez	Team full	Team full	—	Team full
Episode 8 (10 June)	Rosario Flores	4	Zhanel Ali	"I Have Nothing"	Sofía Mourilo	Team full	Team full	—	Team full
Episode 8 (10 June)	Rosario Flores	4	Zhanel Ali	"I Have Nothing"	Jiména Benítez	Team full	Team full	—	Team full
Episode 8 (10 June)	Aitana	5	Alejandra España	"Tacones Rojos"	Alex Barrenechea	Team full	Team full	—N/a	Team full
Episode 8 (10 June)	Aitana	5	Alejandra España	"Tacones Rojos"	Paula Villarroya	Team full	Team full	—N/a	Team full
Episode 8 (10 June)	Sebastián Yatra	6	Joel Gómez	"Rewrite the Stars"	Ibone Sardón	Team full	Team full	—	Team full
Episode 8 (10 June)	Sebastián Yatra	6	Joel Gómez	"Rewrite the Stars"	Layna Fernández	Team full	Team full	—	Team full
Episode 8 (10 June)	Rosario Flores	7	Érika Martín	"Me Quedo Contigo"	Natalia Marín	Team full	Team full	—	Team full
Episode 8 (10 June)	Rosario Flores	7	Érika Martín	"Me Quedo Contigo"	Dulce Barroso	Team full	Team full	✔	Team full
Episode 8 (10 June)	David Bisbal	8	Nicole González	"I Finally Found Someone"	Isona Marmol	Team full	Team full	—	Team full
Episode 8 (10 June)	David Bisbal	8	Nicole González	"I Finally Found Someone"	Martina García	Team full	Team full	✔	Team full
Episode 8 (10 June)	Sebastián Yatra	9	Lennon Jon Sharp	"Rayando el Sol"	Lucía Plaza	Team full	Team full	Team full	Team full
Episode 8 (10 June)	Sebastián Yatra	9	Lennon Jon Sharp	"Rayando el Sol"	Aroa Díaz	Team full	Team full	Team full	Team full
Episode 8 (10 June)	Aitana	10	Álvaro Tadeo	"Your Song"	Hugo González	Team full	Team full	Team full	Team full
Episode 8 (10 June)	Aitana	10	Álvaro Tadeo	"Your Song"	Nacho López	Team full	Team full	Team full	Team full

== Knockouts ==
The knockouts round started on 17 June. Known as "El Asalto" in Spanish, in this round each teams' seven participants perform, and only four from each team go through to the semi-final. The advisors from the battles continued to help the coaches in their choices. David and Aitana's team's performances aired on 17 June and Yatra and Rosario's team's performances aired on 24 June.

Knockouts color key
Artist was advanced to the Semifinal
Artist was eliminated

Episode	Coach	Order	Artist	Song	Result
Episode 9 (17 June)	David Bisbal	1	Lúcia Baizán	"Que Siempre Sea Verano"	Advanced
Episode 9 (17 June)	David Bisbal	2	Emma García	"Warrior	Eliminated
Episode 9 (17 June)	David Bisbal	3	Alicia Herrera	"Nana Triste"	Eliminated
Episode 9 (17 June)	David Bisbal	4	Aitana González	"His Eye Is on the Sparrow"	Advanced
Episode 9 (17 June)	David Bisbal	5	Daniela Montes	"All I Want"	Eliminated
Episode 9 (17 June)	David Bisbal	6	Nicole González	"Abandano"	Advanced
Episode 9 (17 June)	David Bisbal	7	Adrián Campos	"Ángel Caído"	Advanced
Episode 9 (17 June)	Aitana	8	Álvaro Tadeo	"The Way You Look Tonight"	Advanced
Episode 9 (17 June)	Aitana	9	Juanvi Fuentes	"No te Pude Retenes"	Advanced
Episode 9 (17 June)	Aitana	10	Ana Valero	"Natural Woman"	Advanced
Episode 9 (17 June)	Aitana	11	Alejandra España	"Mañana"	Eliminated
Episode 9 (17 June)	Aitana	12	Dulce Barroso	"Qué Bonito"	Eliminated
Episode 9 (17 June)	Aitana	13	Martina García	"La Rosa"	Eliminated
Episode 9 (17 June)	Aitana	14	Manuela de la Fuente	"I Will Always Love You"	Advanced
Episode 10 (24 June)	Sebastián Yatra	1	Rubén Franco	"La Niña De Fuego"	Advanced
Episode 10 (24 June)	Sebastián Yatra	2	Béty Dumitru	"Bohemian Rhapsody"	Advanced
Episode 10 (24 June)	Sebastián Yatra	3	Samuel Marín	"La Llorona"	Advanced
Episode 10 (24 June)	Sebastián Yatra	4	Lucía Fernández	"Happier"	Advanced
Episode 10 (24 June)	Sebastián Yatra	5	Joel Gómez	"Yellow"	Eliminated
Episode 10 (24 June)	Sebastián Yatra	6	Molly & Shelly	"Who's Lovin' You"	Eliminated
Episode 10 (24 June)	Sebastián Yatra	7	Lennon Jon Sharp	"Highway to Hell"	Eliminated
Episode 10 (24 June)	Rosario Flores	8	Alfonso Ortiz	"Mía"	Advanced
Episode 10 (24 June)	Rosario Flores	9	Zhanel Ali	"Hurt"	Advanced
Episode 10 (24 June)	Rosario Flores	10	Paula Román	"No One Like You"	Advanced
Episode 10 (24 June)	Rosario Flores	11	Érika Martín	"Amor de San Juan"	Eliminated
Episode 10 (24 June)	Rosario Flores	12	Daniela Marinho	"Love of My Life"	Eliminated
Episode 10 (24 June)	Rosario Flores	13	Sara Pañero	"The Best"	Eliminated
Episode 10 (24 June)	Rosario Flores	14	Amanda Sánchez	"La Mudanza"	Advanced

== Final phase ==
=== Week 1: Semi-final (1 July) ===
Semi-final color key
Artist advanced to the Finale
Artist was eliminated

Order	Coach	Artist	Song	Result
1	David Bisbal	Lucía Baizán	"Corazón Delgado"	Advanced
2	David Bisbal	Adrián Campos	"Como las Alas al Viento"	Advanced
3	David Bisbal	Nicole González	"Cançao do Mar"	Eliminated
4	David Bisbal	Aitana González	"Oh Happy Day"	Eliminated
5	Aitana	Manuela de la Fuente	"My Heart Will Go On"	Advanced
6	Aitana	Ana Valero	"Blinding Lights"	Eliminated
7	Aitana	Juanvi Fuentes	"Siempre fue Mucho más Fácil"	Eliminated
8	Aitana	Álvaro Tadeo	"If I Can Dream"	Advanced
9	Sebastián Yatra	Rubén Franco	"Y Sin Embargo te Quiero"	Advanced
10	Sebastián Yatra	Béty Dumitru	"Je vais t'aimer"	Advanced
11	Sebastián Yatra	Samuel Marín	"Solo Tú"	Eliminated
12	Sebastián Yatra	Lucía Fernández	"Inevitable"	Eliminated
13	Rosario Flores	Amanda Sánchez	"Al Alba"	Advanced
14	Rosario Flores	Paula Román	"Listen to Your Heart"	Eliminated
15	Rosario Flores	Zhanel Ali	"Beautiful"	Advanced
16	Rosario Flores	Alfonso Ortiz	"Prometo"	Eliminated

=== Week 2: Finale (8 July) ===
==== Round one ====
Finale color key
Artist was chosen by his/her coach to advance to round two
Artist was eliminated

Order	Coach	Artist	Song	Duet with team advisor	Result
1	Aitana	Manuela de la Fuente	"Halo"	"Bailemos" (with Dani Fernández)	Aitana's choice
2	Aitana	Álvaro Tadeo	"Vete de Mí"	"Bailemos" (with Dani Fernández)	Eliminated
3	Sebastián Yatra	Rubén Franco	"Que no Daría Yo"	"El Mejor de tus Errores" (with Rayden)	Yatra's choice
4	Sebastián Yatra	Béty Dumitru	"Always Remember Us This Way"	"El Mejor de tus Errores" (with Rayden)	Eliminated
5	Rosario Flores	Amanda Sánchez	"Desde la Azotea"	"Duende del Sur" (with La Mari)	Rosario's choice
6	Rosario Flores	Zhanel Ali	"Out Here on My Own"	"Duende del Sur" (with La Mari)	Eliminated
7	David Bisbal	Adrián Campos	"La Mala Costumbre"	"Vacio" (with Rosa López)	Eliminated
8	David Bisbal	Lucía Baizán	"Y ¿Si Fuera Ella"	"Vacio" (with Rosa López)	David's choice

==== Round two ====
Order	Coach	Artist	Duet with coach	Result
1	Rosario Flores	Amanda Sánchez	"Como Si Nada"	Fourth Place
2	David Bisbal	Lucía Baizán	"Se nos Rompió el Amor"	Runner-up
3	Aitana	Manuela de la Fuente	"Otra Vez"	Third Place
4	Sebastián Yatra	Rubén Franco	"Quererte Bonito"	Winner

=== Overall ===
Color key
Artist's info

- Team David
- Team Rosario
- Team Aitana
- Team Yatra

Result details

- Winner
- Runner-up
- Third Place
- Fourth Place
- Advanced to the next round
- Eliminated

Live Show Results per week
Artists	Semifinal, Top 8	Grand finale	
Rubén Franco	Safe	Safe	Winner
Lucía Baizán	Safe	Safe	Runner-up
Manuela de la Fuente	Safe	Safe	Third Place
Amanda Sánchez	Safe	Safe	Fourth Place
Álvaro Tadeo	Safe	Eliminated	Eliminated (Round one)
Béty Dumitru	Safe	Eliminated	Eliminated (Round one)
Adrián Campos	Safe	Eliminated	Eliminated (Round one)
Zhanel Ali	Safe	Eliminated	Eliminated (Round one)
Nicole González	Eliminated	Eliminated (Semifinal)	
Aitana González	Eliminated	Eliminated (Semifinal)	
Juanvi Fuentes	Eliminated	Eliminated (Semifinal)	
Ana Valero	Eliminated	Eliminated (Semifinal)	
Samuel Marín	Eliminated	Eliminated (Semifinal)	
Lucía Fernández	Eliminated	Eliminated (Semifinal)	
Alfonso Ortiz	Eliminated	Eliminated (Semifinal)	
Paula Román	Eliminated	Eliminated (Semifinal)	
