= La Voz Kids (Spanish TV series) season 7 =

La Voz Kids
- Season 7
- Hosted by: Eva González; Juanra Bonet (backstage host)
- Coaches: David Bisbal; Aitana; Sebastián Yatra; Pablo López
- Winner: Pol Calvo
- Winning coach: Pablo López
- Runner-up: Marina Oliván

Release
- Original network: Antena 3
- Original release: 27 May – 22 July 2022

Season chronology
- ← Previous; Season 6 Next → Season 8

The seventh season of La Voz Kids premiered on 27 May 2022 on Antena 3. This season, David Bisbal is the only returning coach from the previous season after the departure of three coaches, Rosario Flores, Vanesa Martín and Melendi. Pablo López who became coach in the regular version of the show was announced as the new coach. Meanwhile, they were joined by Sebastián Yatra, who became coach in La Voz Kids Colombia and the previous season's coach adviser Aitana. Eva González and Juanra Bonet remained as the host of the program.

Pol Calvo from Team Pablo was announced as the winner, marking Pablo López's first and only win as a coach on La Voz Kids. However, with Calvo's win, López became the only coach to win on all three versions of the show: La Voz, La Voz Senior, and La Voz Kids.

== Coaches and Hosts ==
La Voz Kids Season 7 Coaches and Hosts

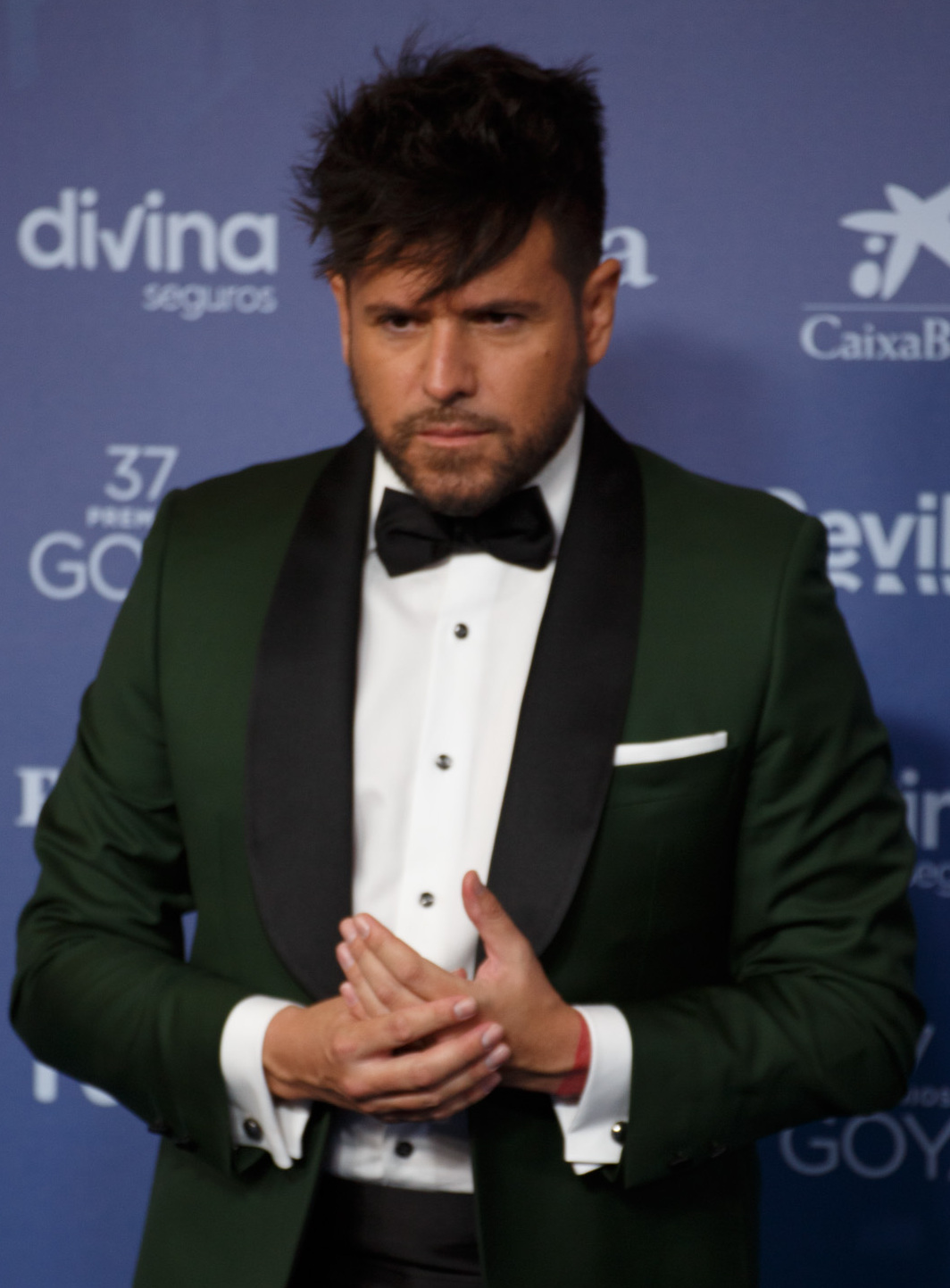
Pablo López

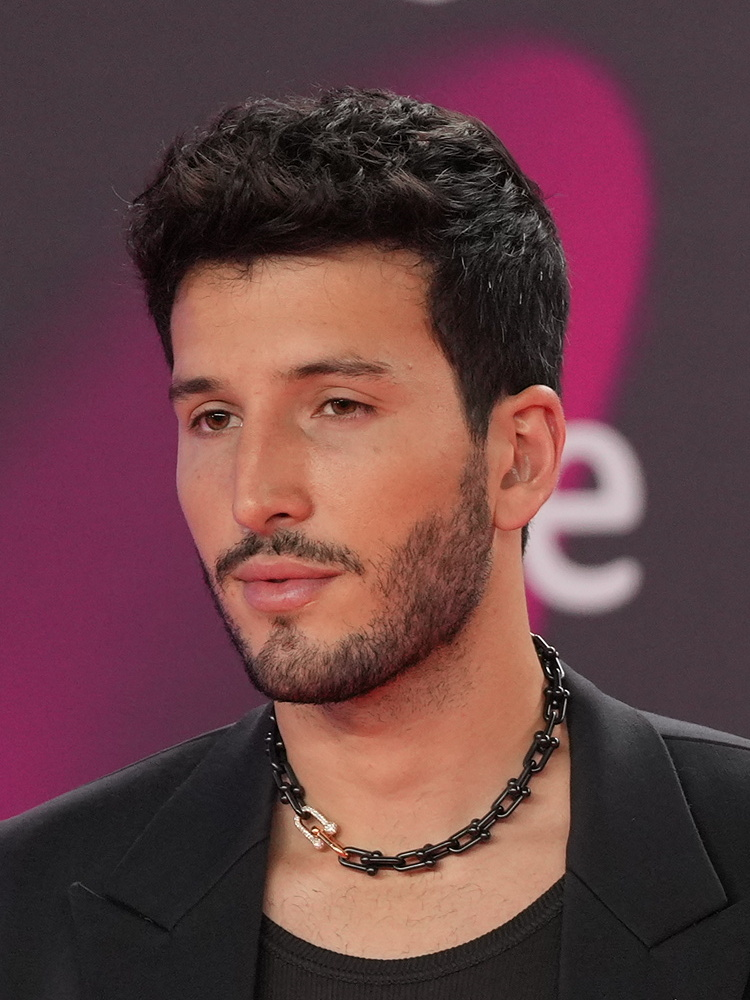
Sebastián Yatra

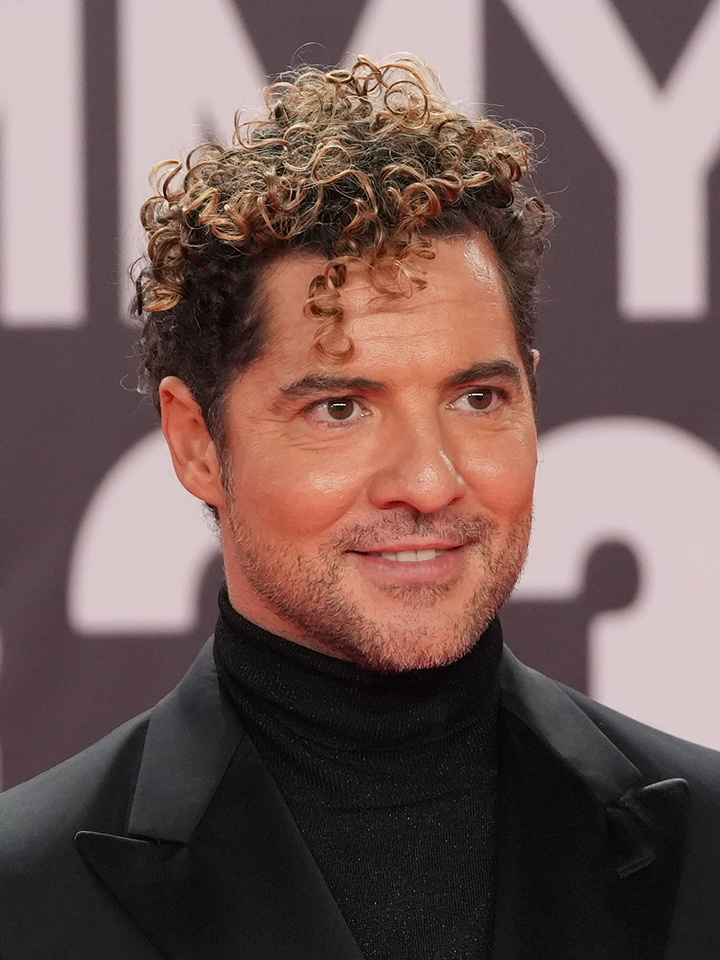
David Bisbal

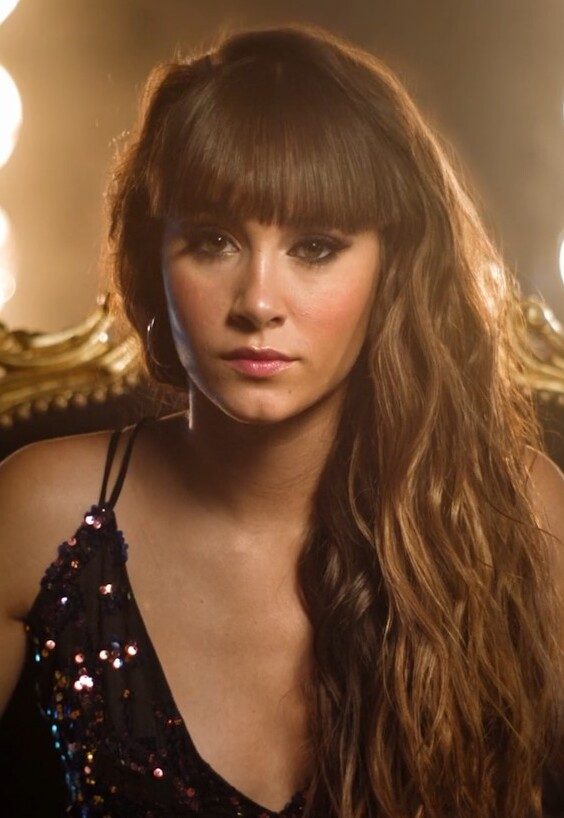
Aitana

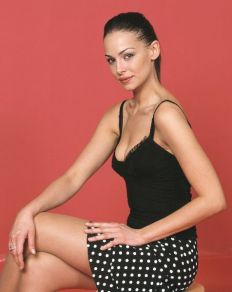
Eva González

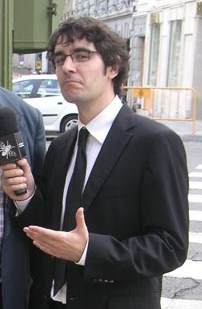
Juanra Bonet

In this season, there are changes in coach panel, only David Bisbal returned from previous season. Pablo López who became coach in the regular version of the show, Sebastián Yatra who became coach in La Voz Kids Colombia and the previous season's coach adviser Aitana are announced as the new coach, replacing Rosario Flores, Vanesa Martín and Melendi.

Eva González and Juanra Bonet continuing their hosting on the program.

== Teams ==
- Winner
- Runner-up
- Third place
- Fourth place
- Eliminated in the Finale
- Eliminated in the Semi-final
- Eliminated in the Knockouts
- Stolen in the Battles
- Eliminated in the Battles

Coaches	Top 60 Artists					
David Bisbal						
David Bisbal	Triana Jiménez	Irene Molina	Blanca Miralles	Aroa Salaño	Pablo Fernández	Enrique Gabarre
David Bisbal	María Arilla	~~Christian Losada~~	~~Nayeli Ruíz~~	José David Giménez	Rubén Gómez	Gio García Alonso
David Bisbal	Naia Castro	Anaïs Mardivirin	Mara Ugalde	Irene Prieto	Marío Argüello	
Aitana						
Aitana	Marina Oliván	Roberta Fauteck	Emilio Díaz	Carlos Higes	Sandra Valero	Christian Losada
Aitana	Rodrigo Cuesta	~~Marta Porris~~	~~Claudia Santamaría~~	Luna Contador	Carla Pintor	Oihan Aristizabal
Aitana	Elia Camí	Sasha Matsiavina	Carmen Ranea	Francheska Cruz	Naibeth Sánchez	
Sebastián Yatra						
Sebastián Yatra	Antonio Cortés	Marta Porris	Macarena Estévez	Marío Falero	Paula Cañaveras	Guillermo Moreno
Sebastián Yatra	Shariff Ardá	Joel Tena	Zoe Medina	Jesús López	Lucía Aliaño	Diego Pulido
Sebastián Yatra	Paula Paredes	Lena Ilievska	Venecia Franco	Leonor Villalba	María Borja	
Pablo López						
Pablo López	Pol Calvo	Fran García	Daniela de los Ángeles	Marcella Mrvaljevich	Rocío Domínguez	Nayeli Ruíz
Pablo López	Claudia Santamaría	~~María Arilla~~	~~Aroa Salaño~~	~~Antonio Cortés~~	~~Rodrigo Cuesta~~	Carmen Alcalá
Pablo López	David Gil	Ana Palomino	Chloe Casugo	Alberto Guzmán	Idaira Campaña	
Note: Italicized names are stolen contestants (names struck through within former teams).

== Blind Auditions ==
Each coach needs to recruit 15 young artists into their teams. The blocks were raised to three per coach, contrary to two in the previous season. The blocked coach's chair won't turn around. Two coaches can be blocked in one audition.

✔	Coach pressed "QUIERO TU VOZ" button
	Artist elected to join this coach's team
	Artist defaulted to this coach's team
	Artist eliminated as no coach pressing "QUIERO TU VOZ" button
✘	Coach pressed "QUIERO TU VOZ" button, but was blocked by another coach from getting the artist
	Blocked by David; Blocked by Aitana; Blocked by Yatra; Blocked by Pablo

Episode	Order	Artist	Age	Song	Coach's and artist's choices			
Episode	Order	Artist	Age	Song	David	Aitana	Yatra	Pablo
Episode 1 (27 May)	1	Macarena Estévez	7	"Bienvenidos"	✘	✔	✔	✔
Episode 1 (27 May)	2	Marina Olíván	12	"Always Remember Us This Way"	✔	✔	✔	✔
Episode 1 (27 May)	3	Alberto Guzmán	13	"No!"	–	–	—	✔
Episode 1 (27 May)	4	Enrique Gabarre	10	"Algo especial en ti"	–	–	–	–
Episode 1 (27 May)	5	Salomé Iranzo	11	"Qué bonita la vida"	✔	✔	✔	—
Episode 1 (27 May)	6	Sandra Valero	9	"La mala costumbre"	✔	✔	✔	✔
Episode 1 (27 May)	7	Aroa Salaño	14	"Stone Cold"	✔	✔	✔	✔
Episode 1 (27 May)	8	Claudia Domínguez	11	"Eternal Flame"	—	—	—	—
Episode 1 (27 May)	9	Irene Molina	14	"Someone You Loved"	✔	—	✔	—
Episode 1 (27 May)	10	Lucía Sánchez	12	"Mujer contra mujer"	—	—	—	—
Episode 1 (27 May)	11	Rodrigo Cuesta	14	"Thinking Out Loud"	✔	✘	✔	✔
Episode 1 (27 May)	12	María Arilla	14	"On My Own"	✔	✔	✔	✔
Episode 1 (27 May)	13	Rafael Abreu	14	"Si nos dejan"	—	—	—	—
Episode 1 (27 May)	14	Naia Castro	13	"All I Want"	✔	–	–	✔
Episode 2 (3 June)
Episode 2 (3 June)	1	Fran García	12	"The Show Must Go On"	✔	✔	✘	✔
Episode 2 (3 June)	2	Claudia Santamaría	13	"Lovely"	—	✔	—	—
Episode 2 (3 June)	3	Triana Jiménez	10	"Limosna de amores"	✔	✔	✔	—
Episode 2 (3 June)	4	Elena Navarro	10	"Breaking Free"	–	–	–	–
Episode 2 (3 June)	5	Rocío Domínguez	14	"Entre sobras y sobras"	✔	✔	✔	✔
Episode 2 (3 June)	6	Leonor Villalba	8	"Colores en el viento"	✔	✔	✔	✔
Episode 2 (3 June)	7	Gonzalo Alba	10	"Fly Me to the Moon"	–	–	–	–
Episode 2 (3 June)	8	Carmen Alcalá	14	"La Bohème"	✔	✔	–	–
Episode 2 (3 June)	9	David Gil	13	"City of Stars"	—	—	—	✔
Episode 2 (3 June)	10	Hana Picazo	11	"Con las ganas"	—	—	—	—
Episode 2 (3 June)	11	Anaïs Mardivirin	15	"Don't Rain on My Parade"	✔	✔	✔	✔
Episode 2 (3 June)	12	Emilio Díaz	9	"Esta cobardía"	✘	✔	✔	✘
Episode 2 (3 June)	13	Oliver Filgaira	12	"Treat You Better"	–	–	–	–
Episode 2 (3 June)	14	Marío Falero	12	—	—	✔	–	–
Episode 3 (10 June)	1	Francheska Cruz	9	"La Llorona"	✔	✔	✔	✔
Episode 3 (10 June)	2	José David Giménez	11	"Válgame Dios"	✔	✔	—	—
Episode 3 (10 June)	3	Shariff Ardá	10	"Sweet Child o' Mine"	-	✔	✔	—
Episode 3 (10 June)	4	Ellie Wilcox	14	"A Thousand Years"	–	–	–	–
Episode 3 (10 June)	5	Paula Paredes	10	"80 veces"	—	-	✔	—
Episode 3 (10 June)	6	Pol Calvo	14	"I Will Always Love You"	-	-	-	✔
Episode 3 (10 June)	7	Naibeth Sánchez	15	"Anyone"	✔	✔	✘	—
Episode 3 (10 June)	8	Paula Ortega	9	"Be Happy"	—	—	—	—
Episode 3 (10 June)	9	María Borja	9	"Love Someone"	-	-	✔	—
Episode 3 (10 June)	10	Patricia Embid	14	"Crazy in Love"	—	—	—	—
Episode 3 (10 June)	11	Idaira Campaña	11	"Ya lo sabes"	-	-	—	✔
Episode 3 (10 June)	12	Diego Pulido	14	"Guantanamera"	—	-	✔	—
Episode 3 (10 June)	13	Gisela Muñoz	13	"Sobrellevé"	–	–	–	–
Episode 3 (10 June)	14	Mara Ugalde	15	"Hay Cosas en Esta Vida"	✔	–	✘	–
Episode 4 (17 June)
Episode 4 (17 June)	1	Blanca Miralles	10	"Stand by Me"	✔	✔	✔	✔
Episode 4 (17 June)	2	Carla Pintor	8	"Un mundo ideal"	—	✔	—	✔
Episode 4 (17 June)	3	Antonio Cortés	14	"Que te vaya bonito"	✔	✔	✔	✔
Episode 4 (17 June)	4	Elia Camí	14	"Arde"	✔	✔	✔	✔
Episode 4 (17 June)	5	Airon Tortoras	13	"Miedo"	—	—	—	—
Episode 4 (17 June)	6	Joel Tena	10	"Cómo mirarte"	—	—	✔	—
Episode 4 (17 June)	7	Chloe Casugo	14	"You Are the Reason"	✘	✔	✔	✔
Episode 4 (17 June)	8	Laia Brugarolas	13	"Sign of the Times"	—	—	—	—
Episode 4 (17 June)	9	Marta Porris	12	"Please Don't Make Me Love You"	—	✔	✔	—
Episode 4 (17 June)	10	Noa Cánovas	12	"Lost on You"	—	—	—	—
Episode 4 (17 June)	11	Zoe Medina	10	"2002"	—	✘	✔	—
Episode 4 (17 June)	12	Marío Argüello	15	"Love of My Life"	✔	—	—	—
Episode 4 (17 June)	13	Lucas Santiago	13	"When We Were Young"	—	—	—	—
Episode 4 (17 June)	14	Rubén Gómez	14	"Mis Tres Puñales"	✔	✔	✔	—
Episode 5 (24 June)
Episode 5 (24 June)	1	Gio García Alonso	8	"Who Wants to Live Forever"	✔	✔	—	✔
Episode 5 (24 June)	2	Roberta Fauteck	12	"Lovin' You"	✔	✔	✔	✘
Episode 5 (24 June)	3	Nayeli Ruíz	12	"Tu canción"	✔	✔	✔	✔
Episode 5 (24 June)	4	Bruno de Montis	14	"Fix You"	—	—	—	—
Episode 5 (24 June)	5	Christian Losada	12	"Desde la Azotea"	✔	✔	✔	✔
Episode 5 (24 June)	6	Oihan Aristizabal	15	"Take Me to Church"	—	✔	✔	—
Episode 5 (24 June)	7	Daniela de los Ángeles	14	"Drivers License"	—	✔	✔	✔
Episode 5 (24 June)	8	Audrey Macías	12	"Someone like You"	—	—	—	—
Episode 5 (24 June)	9	Marcella Mrvaljevich	10	"Shallow"	—	—	—	✔
Episode 5 (24 June)	10	Lena Ilievska	10	"Dream a Little Dream of Me"	—	—	✔	—
Episode 5 (24 June)	11	Alain Sánchez	12	"Lo Bello Que Es Vivir"	—	—	—	—
Episode 5 (24 June)	12	Sasha Matsiavina	13	"Fallin'"	—	✔	—	—
Episode 5 (24 June)	13	Ana Maldonado	12	"La Puerta Violeta"	—	—	—	—
Episode 5 (24 June)	14	Jesús López	14	"Al alba"	✘	—	✔	—
Episode 6 (1 July)	1	Carlos Higes	9	"This is Me"	—	✔	—	—
Episode 6 (1 July)	2	Venecia Franco	11	"Imagine"	—	—	✔	—
Episode 6 (1 July)	3	Pablo Fernández	14	"Come Fly With Me"	✔	✔	✔	—
Episode 6 (1 July)	4	María Bolaño	13	"Undo"	—	—	—	—
Episode 6 (1 July)	5	Paula Cañaveras	14	"Algo Especial en Ti"	—	✔	✔	—
Episode 6 (1 July)	6	Irene Prieto	13	"Maybe"	✔	✔	—	✔
Episode 6 (1 July)	7	Ana Palomino	13	"Vivir"	Team Full	—	—	✔
Episode 6 (1 July)	8	Luna Contador	10	"Mañana"	Team Full	✔	—	Team Full
Episode 6 (1 July)	9	Claudia Urda	8	"Chiquitita"	Team Full	—	—	Team Full
Episode 6 (1 July)	10	Guillermo Moreno	10	"See You Again"	Team Full	—	✔	Team Full
Episode 6 (1 July)	11	María Suárez	11	"All of Me"	Team Full	—	—	Team Full
Episode 6 (1 July)	12	Carmen Ranea	13	"Volver"	Team Full	✔	✘	Team Full
Episode 6 (1 July)	13	Daniela Angelina Socías	12	"Idontwannabeyouanymore"	Team Full	Team Full	—	Team Full
Episode 6 (1 July)	14	Lucía Aliaño	11	"Pena, Penita, Pena"	Team Full	Team Full	✔	Team Full

== Battles ==
The battles round started on 2 July 2022. The coaches can steal two losing artists from other coaches(a rise from previous season's one steal). In addition, coaches' advisors help them on deciding who will be advancing to the next round; Luis Fonsi for Team David Bisbal, Evaluna Montaner for Team Aitana, Lola Índigo for Team Sebastian Yatra and Antonio Orozco for Team Pablo Lopez. Contestants who won their battle or were stolen by another coach advanced to the Knockouts.

Battles color key
Artist was chosen by his/her coach to advance to the Knockouts
Artist was stolen by another coach and advanced to the Knockouts
Artist was eliminated

Episode	Coach	Order	Winner	Song	Losers	'Steal' result			
Episode	Coach	Order	Winner	Song	Losers	David	Aitana	Yatra	Pablo
Episode 7 (2 July)	Pablo López	1	Daniela de los Ángeles	"The Rose Song"	Chloe Casugo	—	—	—	—N/a
Episode 7 (2 July)	Pablo López	1	Daniela de los Ángeles	"The Rose Song"	Aroa Salaño	✔	—	✔	—N/a
Episode 7 (2 July)	David Bisbal	2	Irene Molina	"The Prayer"	Marío Argüello	—N/a	—	—	—
Episode 7 (2 July)	David Bisbal	2	Irene Molina	"The Prayer"	Nayeli Ruiz	—N/a	—	—	✔
Episode 7 (2 July)	Aitana	3	Emilio Diaz	"Tú me dejaste de querer"	Francheska Cruz	—	—N/a	—	—
Episode 7 (2 July)	Aitana	3	Emilio Diaz	"Tú me dejaste de querer"	Carmen Ranea	—	—N/a	—	—
Episode 7 (2 July)	Sebastián Yatra	4	Guillermo Moreno	"In My Blood"	Venecia Franco	—	—	—N/a	—
Episode 7 (2 July)	Sebastián Yatra	4	Guillermo Moreno	"In My Blood"	Lena Ilievska	—	—	—N/a	—
Episode 7 (2 July)	David Bisbal	5	Triana Jiménez	"Falsa moneda"	Mara Ugalde	—N/a	—	—	—
Episode 7 (2 July)	David Bisbal	5	Triana Jiménez	"Falsa moneda"	Rubén Gómez	—N/a	—	—	—
Episode 7 (2 July)	Sebastián Yatra	6	Macarena Estévez	"Por primera vez"	Leonor Villalba	—	—	—N/a	—
Episode 7 (2 July)	Sebastián Yatra	6	Macarena Estévez	"Por primera vez"	María Borja	—	—	—N/a	
Episode 7 (2 July)	Pablo López	7	Fran García	"Follow you"	Alberto Guzmán	—	—	—	—N/a
Episode 7 (2 July)	Pablo López	7	Fran García	"Follow you"	Rodrigo Cuesta	—	✔	—	—N/a
Episode 7 (2 July)	Aitana	8	Marina Oliván	"Unconditionally"	Sasha Matsiavina	—	—N/a	—	—
Episode 7 (2 July)	Aitana	8	Marina Oliván	"Unconditionally"	Naibeth Sánchez	—	—N/a	—	—
Episode 7 (2 July)	David Bisbal	9	Pablo Fernández	"I had to be you"	Anaïs Mardivirin	—N/a	—	—	—
Episode 7 (2 July)	David Bisbal	9	Pablo Fernández	"I had to be you"	Irene Prieto	—N/a	—	—	—
Episode 7 (2 July)	Pablo López	10	Rocío Domínguez	"Puede ser"	Idaira Campaña	—	—	—	—N/a
Episode 7 (2 July)	Pablo López	10	Rocío Domínguez	"Puede ser"	Antonio Cortés	—	—	✔	—N/a
Episode 8 (8 July)	Aitana	1	Sandra Valero	"Eres tu"	Carla Pintor	—	—N/a	—	—
Episode 8 (8 July)	Aitana	1	Sandra Valero	"Eres tu"	Luna Contador	—	—N/a	—	—
Episode 8 (8 July)	Pablo López	2	Marcella Mrvaljevich	"Issues"	Ana Palomino	—	—	—	—N/a
Episode 8 (8 July)	Pablo López	2	Marcella Mrvaljevich	"Issues"	David Gil	—	—	—	—N/a
Episode 8 (8 July)	David Bisbal	3	Enrique Gabarre	"Angelitos negros"	José David Giménez	—N/a	—	—	—
Episode 8 (8 July)	David Bisbal	3	Enrique Gabarre	"Angelitos negros"	Christian Losada	—N/a	✔	—	—
Episode 8 (8 July)	Aitana	4	Roberta Fauteck	"when the party's over"	Oihan Aristizabal	—	Team full	—	—
Episode 8 (8 July)	Aitana	4	Roberta Fauteck	"when the party's over"	Claudia Santamaría	—	Team full	✔	✔
Episode 8 (8 July)	Sebastián Yatra	5	Shariff Ardá	"Believer"	Diego Pulido	—	Team full	—N/a	Team full
Episode 8 (8 July)	Sebastián Yatra	5	Shariff Ardá	"Believer"	Zoe Medina	—	Team full	—N/a	Team full
Episode 8 (8 July)	Pablo López	6	Pol Calvo	"Saving All My Love for You"	Carmen Alcalá	—	Team full	—	Team full
Episode 8 (8 July)	Pablo López	6	Pol Calvo	"Saving All My Love for You"	María Arilla	✔	Team full	—	Team full
Episode 8 (8 July)	Sebastián Yatra	7	Paula Cañaveras	"Contigo"	Jesús López	Team full	Team full	—N/a	Team full
Episode 8 (8 July)	Sebastián Yatra	7	Paula Cañaveras	"Contigo"	Lucía Aliaño	Team full	Team full	—N/a	Team full
Episode 8 (8 July)	Aitana	8	Carlos Higes	"Scared to be lonely"	Elia Camí	Team full	Team full	—	Team full
Episode 8 (8 July)	Aitana	8	Carlos Higes	"Scared to be lonely"	Marta Porris	Team full	Team full	✔	Team full
Episode 8 (8 July)	Sebastián Yatra	9	Marío Falero	"Bachata Rosa"	Paula Paredes	Team full	Team full	Team full	Team full
Episode 8 (8 July)	Sebastián Yatra	9	Marío Falero	"Bachata Rosa"	Joel Tena	Team full	Team full	Team full	Team full
Episode 8 (8 July)	David Bisbal	10	Blanca Miralles	"Bohemian Rhapsody"	Gio García Alonso	Team full	Team full	Team full	Team full
Episode 8 (8 July)	David Bisbal	10	Blanca Miralles	"Bohemian Rhapsody"	Naia Castro	Team full	Team full	Team full	Team full

== Knockouts ==
The knockouts round started on 9 July. Known as "El Asalto" in Spanish, in this round each teams' seven participants perform, the public decide one of each team to advance for the semi-final, and the coaches select only three to advance for the semi-final. The advisors from the battles continued to help the coaches in their choices.

Knockouts color key
Artist was chosen by the public to advance to the Semifinal
Artist was chosen by his/her coach to advance to the Semifinal
Artist was eliminated

Episode	Coach	Order	Artist	Song	Result
Episode 9 (9 July)	David Bisbal	1	Irene Molina	"Someone You Loved"	Advanced
Episode 9 (9 July)	David Bisbal	2	Triana Jiménez	"Limosna de amores"	Advanced
Episode 9 (9 July)	David Bisbal	3	María Arilla	"On My Own"	Eliminated
Episode 9 (9 July)	David Bisbal	4	Aroa Salaño	"Stone Cold"	Advanced
Episode 9 (9 July)	David Bisbal	5	Enrique Gabarre	"Algo especial en ti"	Eliminated
Episode 9 (9 July)	David Bisbal	6	Pablo Fernández	"Come Fly with Me"	Eliminated
Episode 9 (9 July)	David Bisbal	7	Blanca Miralles	"Stand by Me"	Advanced
Episode 9 (9 July)	Aitana	8	Roberta Fauteck	"Lovin' You"	Advanced
Episode 9 (9 July)	Aitana	9	Sandra Valero	"La mala costumbre"	Eliminated
Episode 9 (9 July)	Aitana	10	Carlos Higes	"This is Me"	Advanced
Episode 9 (9 July)	Aitana	11	Cristian Losada	"La azotea"	Eliminated
Episode 9 (9 July)	Aitana	12	Rodrigo Cuesta	"Thinking Out Loud	Eliminated
Episode 9 (9 July)	Aitana	13	Emilio Díaz	"Esta cobardía"	Advanced
Episode 9 (9 July)	Aitana	14	Marina Oliván	"Always Remember Us This Way"	Advanced
Episode 10 (15 July)	Pablo López	1	Fran García	"The Show Must Go On"	Advanced
Episode 10 (15 July)	Pablo López	2	Daniela de los Ángeles	"Drivers License"	Advanced
Episode 10 (15 July)	Pablo López	3	Rocío Domínguez	"Entre Sobras y Sobras"	Eliminated
Episode 10 (15 July)	Pablo López	4	Marcella Mrvaljevich	"Shallow"	Advanced
Episode 10 (15 July)	Pablo López	5	Nayeli Ruiz	"Tu Canción"	Eliminated
Episode 10 (15 July)	Pablo López	6	Claudia Santamariá	"lovely"	Eliminated
Episode 10 (15 July)	Pablo López	7	Pol Calvo	"I Will Always Love You"	Advanced
Episode 10 (15 July)	Sebastián Yatra	8	Macarena Estévez	"Bienvenidos"	Advanced
Episode 10 (15 July)	Sebastián Yatra	9	Antonio Cortés	"Que te Vaya Bonito"	Advanced
Episode 10 (15 July)	Sebastián Yatra	10	Mario Falero	"Cómo Mirarte"	Advanced
Episode 10 (15 July)	Sebastián Yatra	11	Shariff Ardá	"Sweet Child o' Mine"	Eliminated
Episode 10 (15 July)	Sebastián Yatra	12	Guillermo Moreno	"See You Again"	Eliminated
Episode 10 (15 July)	Sebastián Yatra	13	Paula Cañaveras	"Algo especial en ti"	Eliminated
Episode 10 (15 July)	Sebastián Yatra	14	Marta Porris	"Please Don't Make Me Love You"	Advanced

== Final phase ==
=== Week 1: Semi-final (16 July) ===
Semi-final color key
Artist was chosen by the public to advance to the Finale
Artist was chosen by his/her coach to advance to the Finale
Artist was eliminated

Order	Coach	Artist	Song	Result
1	Pablo López	Fran García	"Livin' on a Prayer"	Advanced
2	Pablo López	Daniela de los Ángeles	"Torn"	Eliminated
3	Pablo López	Marcella Mrvaljevich	"People Help the People"	Eliminated
4	Pablo López	Pol Calvo	"What a Feeling"	Advanced
5	Sebastián Yatra	Macarena Estévez	"11 Razones"	Eliminated
6	Sebastián Yatra	Antonio Cortés	"Soy gitano"	Advanced
7	Sebastián Yatra	Mario Falero	"+"	Eliminated
8	Sebastián Yatra	Marta Porris	"You Are the Reason"	Advanced
9	David Bisbal	Blanca Miralles	"Close to You"	Eliminated
10	David Bisbal	Triana Jiménez	"María de la O"	Advanced
11	David Bisbal	Aroa Salaño	"Halo"	Eliminated
12	David Bisbal	Irene Molina	"Human"	Advanced
13	Aitana	Roberta Fauteck	"Shake It Out"	Advanced
14	Aitana	Carlos Higes	"Manos de Tijera"	Eliminated
15	Aitana	Emilio Díaz	"Noches de Bohemia"	Eliminated
16	Aitana	Marina Oliván	"Feeling Good"	Advanced

=== Week 2: Finale (22 July) ===
==== Round one ====
Finale color key
Artist was chosen by his/her coach to advance to round two
Artist was eliminated

Order	Coach	Artist	Song	Duet with team advisor	Result
1	Sebastián Yatra	Antonio Cortés	"Cuando Nadie Me Ve"	"La Niña de la Escuela" (with Lola Índigo)	Yatra's choice
2	Sebastián Yatra	Marta Porris	"Jealous"	"La Niña de la Escuela" (with Lola Índigo)	Eliminated
3	Aitana	Marina Oliván	"Fields of Gold"	"Juramento Eterno de Sal" (with Álvaro de Luna) (Note: Evaluna Montaner, Aitana's advisor, was not present on the episode, so Álvaro de Luna replaced her to sing with Team Aitana.)	Aitana's choice
4	Aitana	Roberta Fauteck	"La Vie en Rose"	"Juramento Eterno de Sal" (with Álvaro de Luna)	Eliminated
5	David Bisbal	Triana Jiménez	"Torre de Arena"	"Se Busca" (with Malú) (Note: Luis Fonsi, David's advisor, was not present on the episode, so Malú replaced him to sing with Team David.)	David's choice
6	David Bisbal	Irene Molina	"One Last Time"	"Se Busca" (with Malú)	Eliminated
7	Pablo López	Fran García	"Carrie"	"Giran y Van" (with Antonio Orozco)	Eliminated
8	Pablo López	Pol Calvo	"All by Myself"	"Giran y Van" (with Antonio Orozco)	Pablo's choice

==== Round two ====
Order	Coach	Artist	Duet with coach	Result
1	Pablo López	Pol Calvo	"El Gato"	Winner
2	Sebastián Yatra	Antonio Cortés	"Dharma"	Fourth place
3	Aitana	Marina Oliván	"="	Runner-up
4	David Bisbal	Triana Jiménez	"La Tenga O No"	Third place

== Elimination Chart ==
=== Overall ===
Color key
Artist's info

- Team David
- Team Aitana
- Team Yatra
- Team Pablo

Result details

- Winner
- Runner-up
- Third place
- Fourth place
- Saved by the public
- Saved by the coach
- Eliminated

Live Show Results per week
Artists	Semifinal, Top 8	Grand finale	
Pol Calvo	Safe	Safe	Winner
Marina Oliván	Safe	Safe	Runner-up
Triana Jiménez	Safe	Safe	Third place
Antonio Cortés	Safe	Safe	Fourth place
Roberta Fauteck	Safe	Eliminated	Eliminated (Round one)
Marta Porris	Safe	Eliminated	Eliminated (Round one)
Irene Molina	Safe	Eliminated	Eliminated (Round one)
Fran García	Safe	Eliminated	Eliminated (Round one)
Aroa Salaño	Eliminated	Eliminated (Semifinal)	
Blanca Miralles	Eliminated	Eliminated (Semifinal)	
Carlos Higes	Eliminated	Eliminated (Semifinal)	
Emilio Díaz	Eliminated	Eliminated (Semifinal)	
Macarena Estévez	Eliminated	Eliminated (Semifinal)	
Mario Falero	Eliminated	Eliminated (Semifinal)	
Daniela de Los Ángeles	Eliminated	Eliminated (Semifinal)	
Marcella Mrvaljevich	Eliminated	Eliminated (Semifinal)	
