= Pol Calvo =

Spanish singer and songwriter (born 2006)

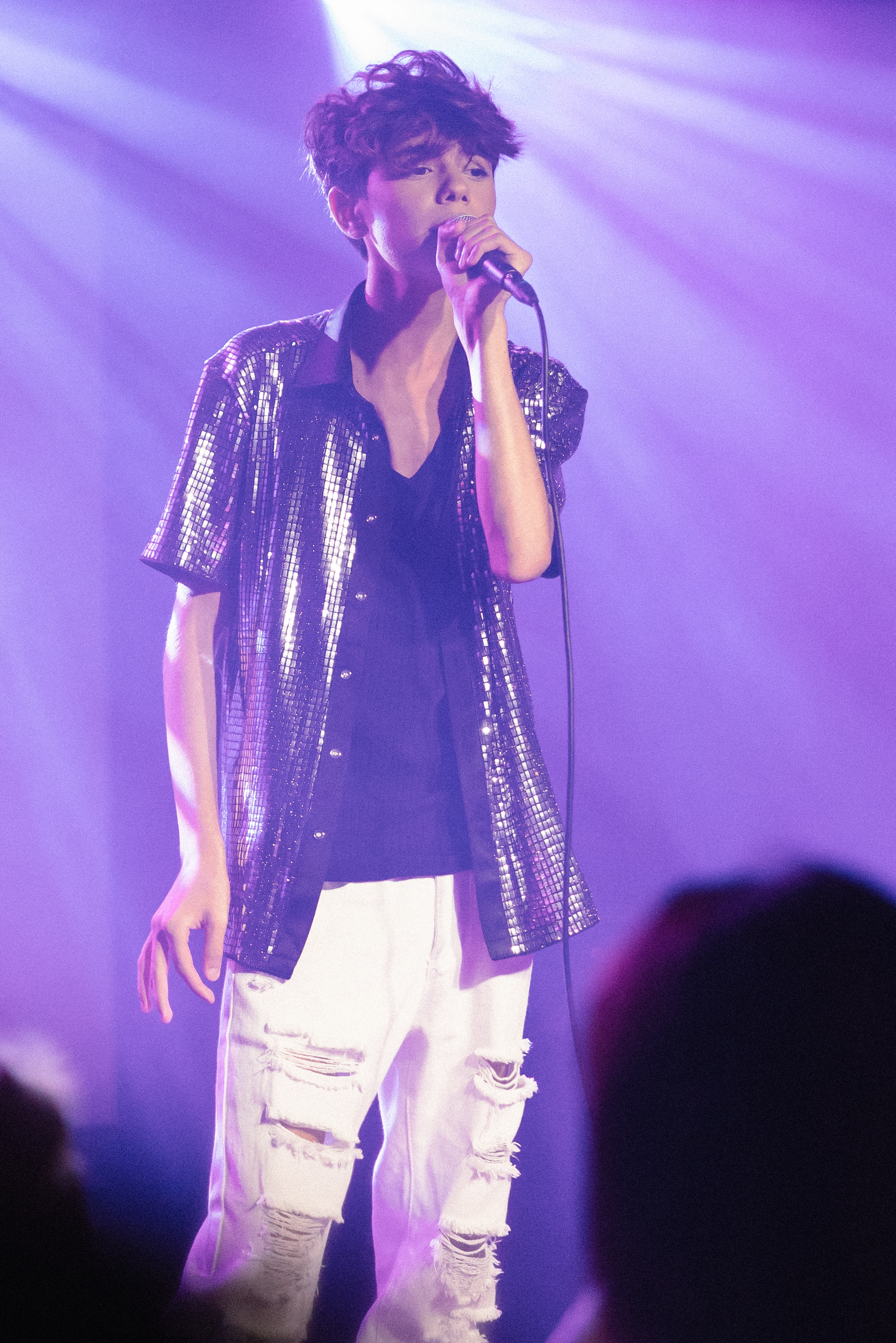
- Pol Calvo live in concert at the Razzmatazz Club in Barcelona, July 2024

Background information
- Born: Pol Calvo Sánchez; August 4, 2006 (age 20); Barcelona
- Origin: Spain
- Genres: Pop, Ballad, Gospel
- Instruments: Vocals, Piano, Ukulele, Flute
- Years active: 2016–present
- Label: Music Empire LLC

Pol Calvo Sánchez, known artistically as Pol Calvo (Spanish pronunciation: [ˈpol ˈkalβo]; Barcelona, Spain, 4 August 2006) is a Spanish singer and songwriter. He first rose to fame in Spain and Latin America in 2022 after having won the seventh season of La Voz Kids, as part of Team Pablo, and continued growing in global reach during 2023 by publishing and performing live on social networks a series of original song covers. In 2024, Calvo started a concert tour and announced the release of his first EP.

He won a contract with Universal Music, releasing his first single called "Tu Madrid" on 27 October 2022 (UTC). On 12 January 2023, he revealed a self-authored unpublished song, titled "No fue suficiente" (Spanish pronunciation: [no fwe sufiˈθjente]; "It was not enough"). Subsequently, he presented a swing-styled composition titled "Todo por mí" (Spanish pronunciation: [ˈtoðo poɾ ˈmi]; "All for me") on 29 March 2023.

Live in concert at the notorious Sala Clamores in Madrid, Pol Calvo presented his latest song "El Diferente" (Spanish pronunciation: [el difeˈɾente]; "The Different One") on 13 January 2024. This song and its theme about bravery to combat school violence had an impact in creating philanthropic synergies between entities involved in the matter. He released the videoclip on 24 October 2025.

By mid-January Pol Calvo presented his musical projects for 2024, including tour dates in the USA.

In May 2024 he unveiled images of his 1st EP's launching song, titled "No Tengo Respuestas" (Spanish pronunciation: [no 'teŋgo res'pwestas]; "Ain't No Answers"), which was released worldwide on 7 June. In August same year he shared snippets of the 2nd single from the EP, called "Ya No Sé Volver" (Spanish pronunciation: [ʝa ˈno ˈse βolˈβeɾ]; "Won't Find Way Back"), which had a worldwide release on 6 September. After a small Christmas concert tour in coastal Spain, he announced the release of the 3rd single programmed for 7 February 2025, "Dime" (Spanish pronunciation: [ˈdime] "Tell me"). Later the same year, on 14 August, he released an additional song "Que te Perdone Dios" (Spanish pronunciation: [ke te peɾðone djos]; "May God Forgive you").

Pol Calvo regularly performs with videoclips for his songs as storytelling.

== Biography ==
Pol Calvo was born in Barcelona, Spain, 4 August 2006. He started singing alone to songs by Malú, discovering its own talent and taste. He has been interested about music and practicing singing in front of an audience since he was 4 years old.

As of July 2023, Calvo is enrolled to pursue an International Arts Baccalaureate in Music.

== La Voz Kids ==
Pol Calvo attempted first time to enter the contest in 2016. While he passed the first video casting, he was eliminated in the selection process.

He tried again in 2021 (Season 7, aired in 2022), this time successfully accessing the Blind auditions phase, which counted with the coaches David Bisbal, Sebastián Yatra, Aitana and Pablo López.

Pol Calvo defaulted to Pablo López's team, as he was the only coach to turn his chair at the end of the performance. Calvo went on to win the competition on 22 July 2022.

La Voz Kids performances and results
Episode	Song	Original Artist	Result
Season 7 (2022)
Audition	"I Will Always Love You"	Dolly Parton / Whitney Houston	Joined team Pablo; through to Battle Rounds
Battle Rounds	"Saving All My Love for You"	Michael Masser/Gerry Goffin	Through to the Knockouts
The Knockouts	"I Will Always Love You"	Whitney Houston	Through to live shows
Semi-final	"Flashdance... What a Feeling"	Keith Forsey / Giorgio Moroder	Through to the Final
Grand Final	"All by Myself"	Céline Dion	Winner
Grand Final	"Giran y Van" (with Antonio Orozco)	Antonio Orozco	Winner
Grand Final	"El Gato" (with Pablo López)	Pablo López	Winner

== Artistry ==
=== Influences ===
Pol Calvo is influenced by international ballad and pop music and inspired by Aitana, Whitney Houston, Celine Dion, Sia, Ariana Grande and Morat.

He has expressed interest in being exposed to different musical genres, stating that "this dynamism is necessary for musicians". In particular, Calvo has shown a specific penchant for exploring operatic and other lyric genres. His versatility has been also appraised by several media.

== Personal life ==
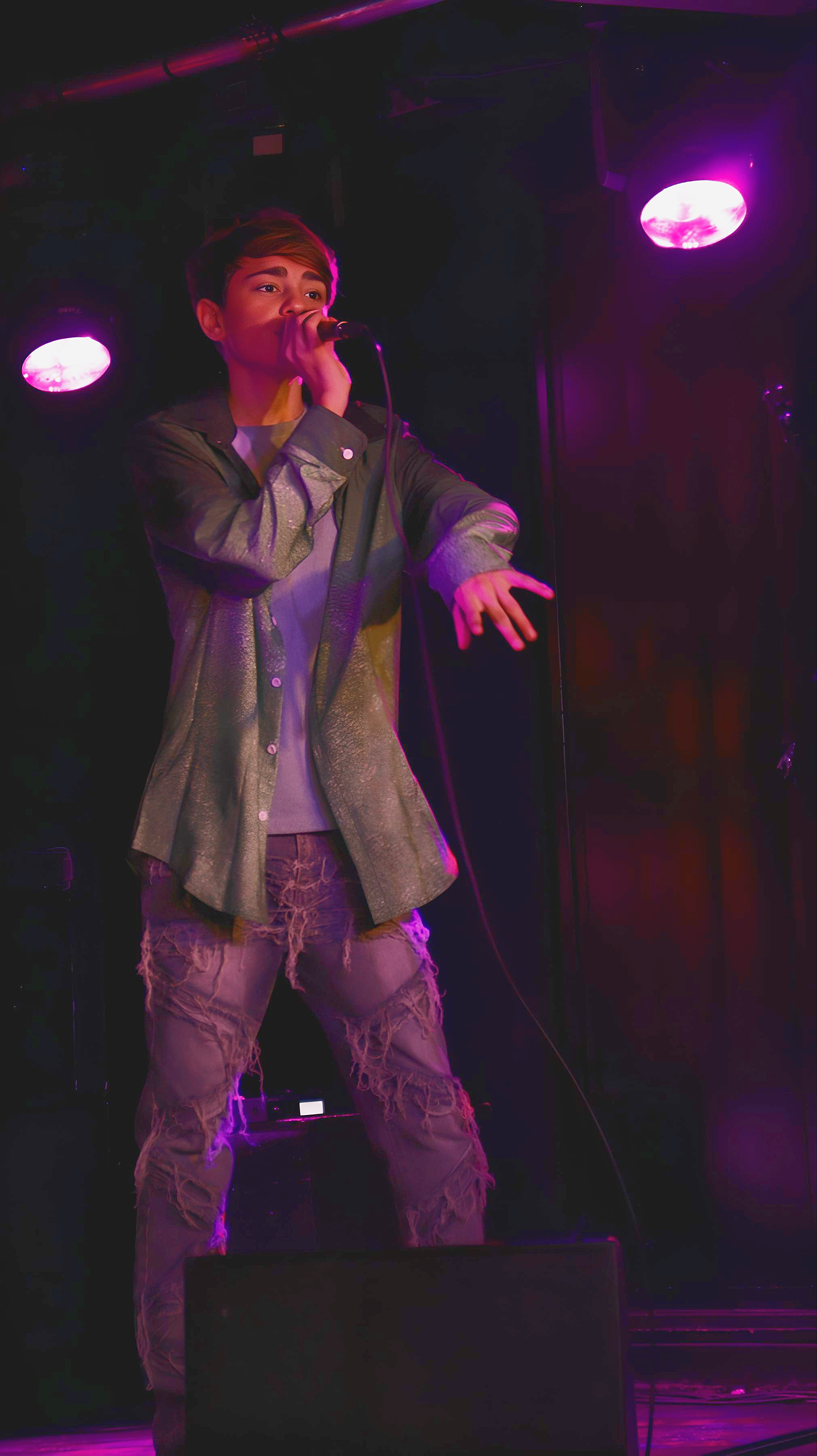
Pol Calvo live in concert at the notorious Sala Clamores, Madrid, Spain, January 2024

Pol Calvo lives with his parents and older sister near Barcelona, and none of his relatives has been linked with professional musical activity in the past.

As of February 2023 Pol Calvo began to develop a long-distance Romantic Friendship with Madrilenian Lucía Sánchez, a fellow participant from La Voz Kids in whose network they had got acquainted with each other.

Calvo likes dogs and owns one named "Lana".

== Philanthropy ==
On 2 May 2024 Pol Calvo participated in a song to get funds for projects against bullying with fellow singer Natalia Barone.

On 30 November 2024 he is expected to perform live in solidarity to fight against childhood cancer at "Aladina Xmas Weekend".

He also participated in other events to rise funding for medical research, including ALS, as he did on 8 June 2025, together with other artists or at the "Juntos contra el Cáncer" ("Together against Cancer") event on 21 March 2026.

== Discography ==
=== Singles ===
Title	Year	Album
"Tu Madrid"	2022	Non-album singles
"Aquí Pintamos Todos"	2024	Non-album singles (collaboration)
"No Tengo Respuestas"	2024	1st EP: Tan Cerca de Todo
"Ya No Sé Volver"	2024	1st EP: Tan Cerca de Todo
"Dime"	2025	1st EP: Tan Cerca de Todo
"Que te Perdone Dios"	2025	1st EP: Tan Cerca de Todo
"El Diferente"	2025	Concert original

"Tu Madrid"

Single by Pol Calvo
- Language: Spanish
- Released: 2022
- Genre: Latin ballad & Pop/Rock
- Length: 2:59
- Label: Universal
- Songwriter: Pol Calvo

"Tu Madrid" (Spanish pronunciation: [tu maˈðɾið]; "Your Madrid") is the first single by Spanish singer Pol Calvo. It was released on 28 October 2022.

"No Tengo Respuestas"

Single by Pol Calvo
- Language: Spanish
- Released: 2024
- Genre: Latin ballad & Pop/Rock
- Length: 3:04
- Label: Music Empire LLC
- Songwriter: Pol Calvo
- Producer: Roy Chinchilla

"No Tengo Respuestas" (Spanish pronunciation: [no 'teŋgo res'pwestas]; "Ain´t No Answers") is Pol Calvo´s 1st EP's launching song, released worldwide on 6 June 2024.

"Ya No Sé Volver"

Single by Pol Calvo
- Language: Spanish
- Released: 2024
- Genre: Latin ballad & Pop/Rock
- Length: 2:41
- Label: Music Empire LLC
- Songwriter: Pol Calvo
- Producer: Roy Chinchilla

"Ya No Sé Volver" (Spanish pronunciation: [ʝa ˈno ˈse βolˈβeɾ]; "Won't Find Way Back") is a song where Pol Calvo continues the life story of his 1st EP, released worldwide on 6 September 2024.

"Dime"

Single by Pol Calvo
- Language: Spanish
- Released: 2025
- Genre: Power ballad
- Length: 2:34
- Label: Music Empire LLC
- Songwriter: Pol Calvo
- Producer: Roy Chinchilla

"Dime" (Spanish pronunciation: [ˈdime]; "Tell me") is a composition where Pol Calvo takes a new path and a slightly slower and more intense music style, going on with the story of his 1st EP. It was released worldwide on 7 February 2025.

"Que te Perdone Dios"

Single by Pol Calvo
- Language: Spanish
- Released: 2025
- Genre: Pop rock
- Length: 3:36
- Label: Music Empire LLC
- Songwriter: Pol Calvo
- Producer: Roy Chinchilla

"Que te Perdone Dios" (Spanish pronunciation: [ke te peɾðone djos]; "May God Forgive you") Pol Calvo explore more poignant and hard lyrics and music for horizons, closing with the story of his 1st EP. This single was worldwide released on 15 August 2025.

"El Diferente"

Single by Pol Calvo
- Language: Spanish
- Released: 2025
- Genre: Power ballad
- Length: 2:49
- Label: Music Empire LLC
- Songwriter: Pol Calvo
- Producer: Roy Chinchilla

"El Diferente" (Spanish pronunciation: [el difeˈɾente]; "The Different One") presented initially in concert, and later released in videoclip on 24 October 2025, where Pol Calvo challenges on the serious issue of Bullying proposing a wide view including inner solutions and social addressing.

== Live Performances and Concerts ==
On 3 December 2022, at Llinars del Vallès, Pol Calvo performed live for the first time after rising to fame. It was a rendition to the Gospel song "For Your Glory" of the album Grace by Tasha Cobbs.

On 17 December 2022, at about 1:00 am local time in Madrid (midnight UTC), Pol Calvo gave a surprise live performance at the national TV, together with current winners of La Voz (both Adult and Senior), of the song "La Mejor Noche de mi Vida", from the Album "Once Historias y un Piano", by their former coach Pablo López.

On 23 December 2022, Pol Calvo performed live for the first time in a classical theater, at the Palau de la Música -a UNESCO World Heritage Site- in Barcelona, Spain. This was also the first time that he was accompanied by a Classical Music Orchestra.

In November 2023 he announced his first concert in solitary, programmed at the notorious Sala Clamores, a celebrated place during the Movida Madrileña.

In 2024 he announced additional tour dates, including a concert in his native Barcelona at the historic Razzmatazz club, presenting live his new published EP coming earlier in the year.

In 2025 he performed on tour through different regions of mainland Spain and beyond. He also sang in Catalan language for the first time, during a regional broadcast.

On 7 April 2026, Pol Calvo performed for the first time in a sports stadium, in front of 8,000 people, in a match between Joventut Badalona and AEK B.C..

== Cinema Industry ==
Pol Calvo gave the boy voice (Spanish interpretation) of the main character of the movie David (2025).
