= La Voz Kids (Spanish TV series) season 9 =

La Voz Kids
- Season 9
- Hosted by: Eva González; Juanra Bonet (backstage host)
- Coaches: David Bisbal; Lola Índigo; Rosario Flores; Melendi
- Winner: Alira Moya
- Winning coach: David Bisbal
- Runner-up: Juan Francisco Morán

Release
- Original network: Antena 3
- Original release: 13 April – 13 July 2024

Season chronology
- ← Previous; Season 8 Next → Season 10

The ninth season of La Voz Kids premiered on 13 April 2024 on Antena 3. This season, David Bisbal and Rosario Flores reprised their roles as coaches from the previous season. Melendi returned as a coach for his fourth season after a two-season absence, replacing Sebastián Yatra. Debutant Lola Índigo joined as a coach this season, replacing Aitana.

Eva González and Juanra Bonet remained as the hosts of the program.

On 13 July, Alira Moya was announced as the winner of this season, marking David Bisbal's second and final win as a coach. He became the second coach on La Voz Kids to win the show twice, after Melendi. Additionally, David Bisbal became the fourth coach out of all versions of La Voz to win three times, behind Malú, Pablo López and Antonio Orozco.

== Coaches and Hosts ==
La Voz Kids Season 9 Coaches and Hosts

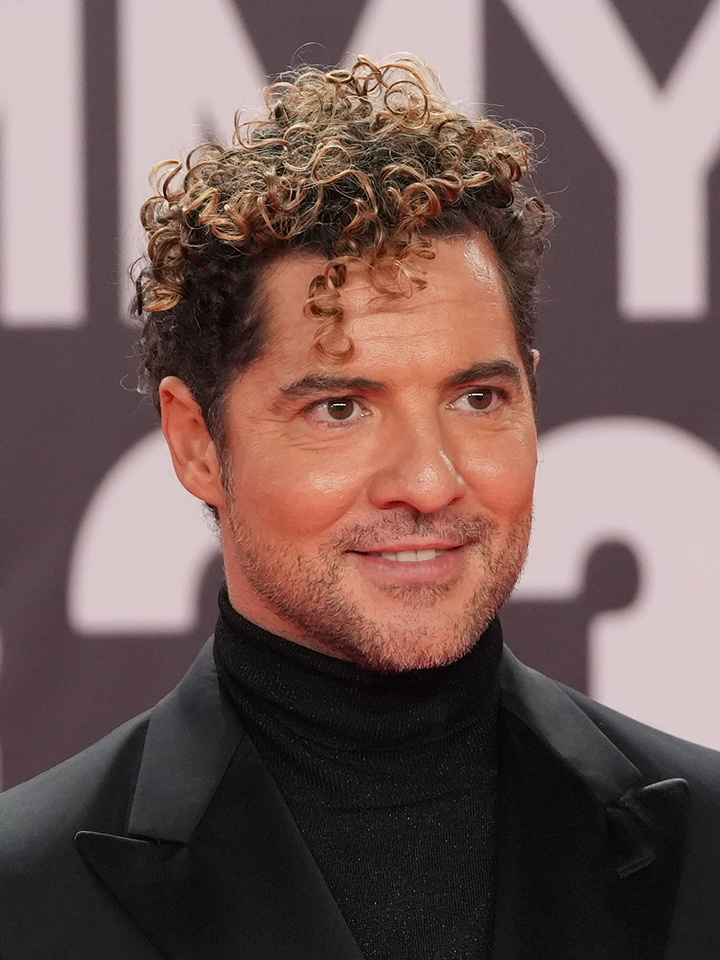
David Bisbal

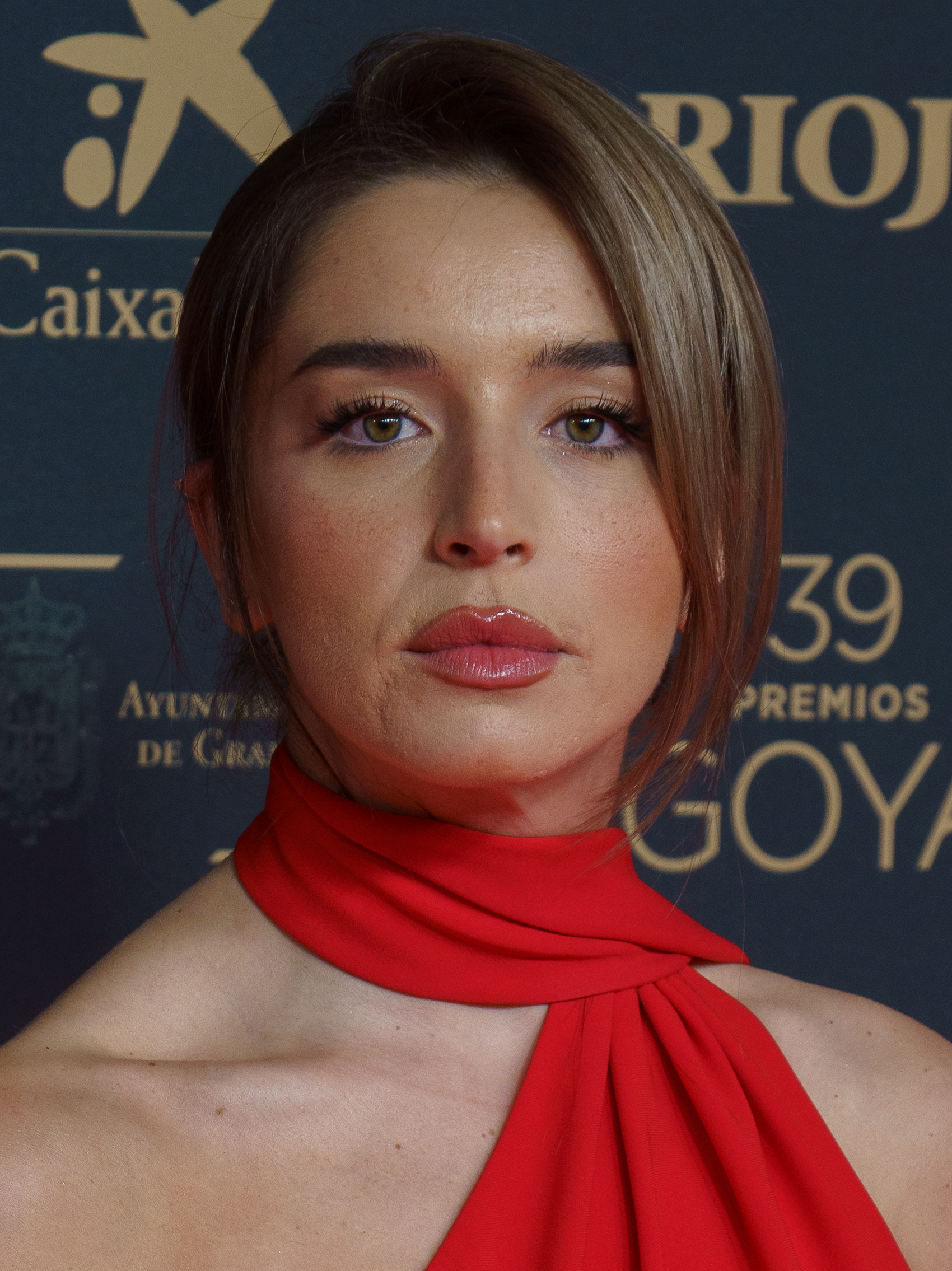
Lola Índigo

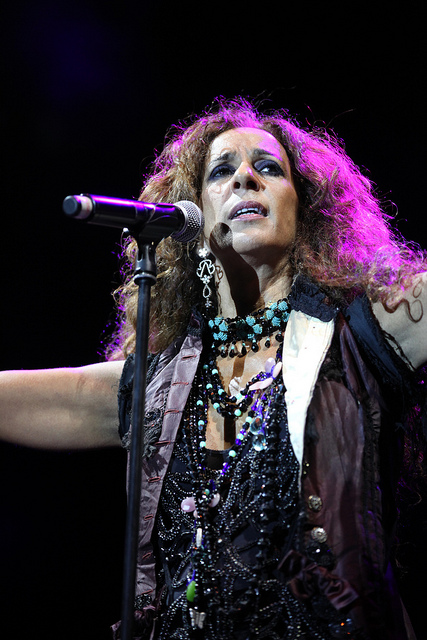
Rosario Flores

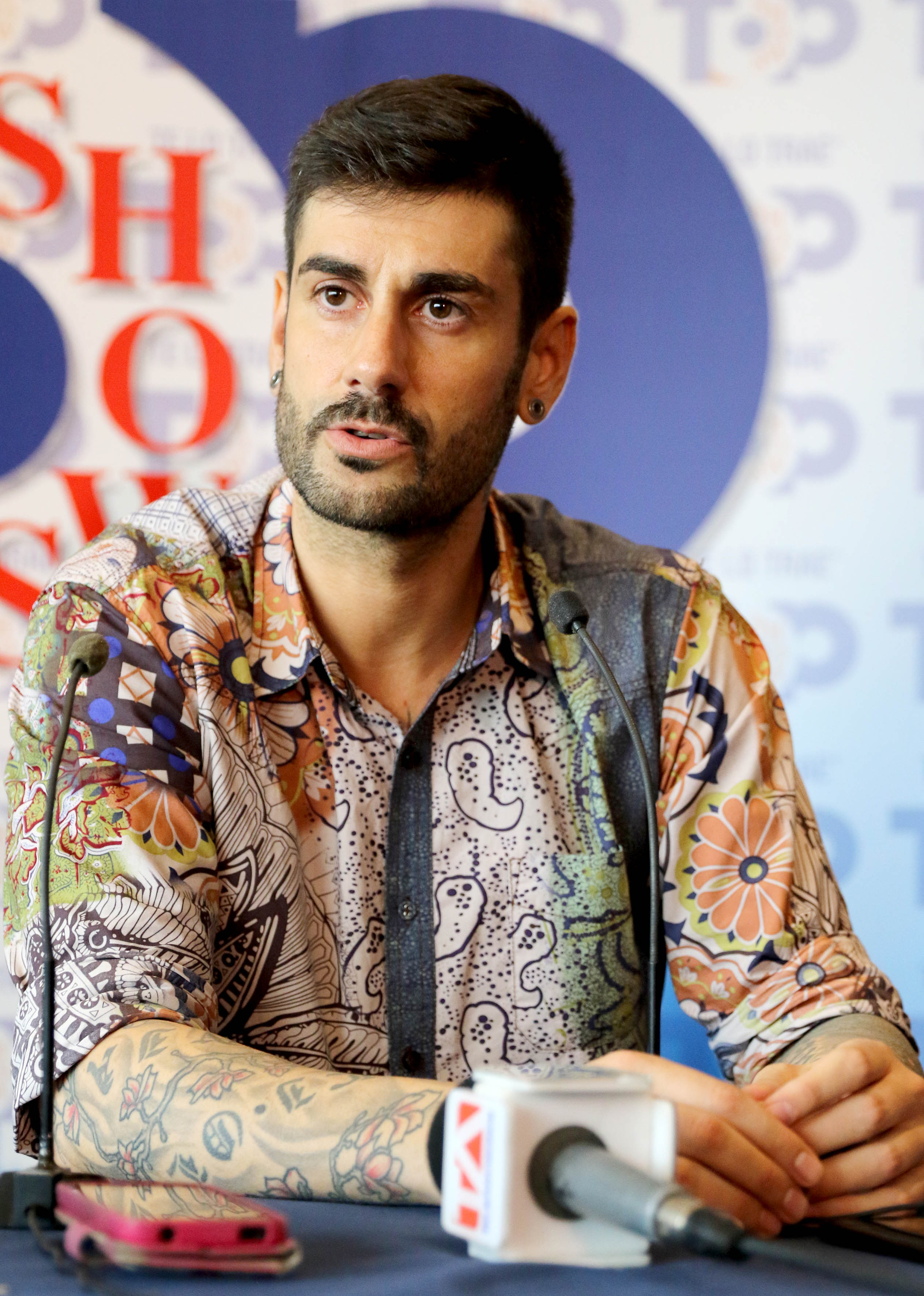
Melendi

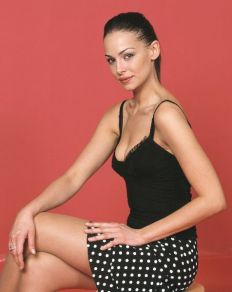
Eva González

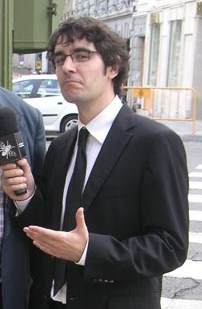
Juanra Bonet

In this season, two out of the four coaches from the previous season remained as coaches. David Bisbal and Rosario Flores both returned for their eighth season as coaches. Melendi returned after a two-season absence, and Lola Índigo debuted as a new coach.

Eva González and Juanra Bonet continued hosting on the program.

== Teams ==
- Winner
- Runner-up
- Third Place
- Fourth Place
- Eliminated in the Finale
- Eliminated in the Semi-final
- Eliminated in the Phase 2 of the Knockouts
- Stolen in Phase 1 of the Knockouts
- Eliminated in Phase 1 of the Knockouts
- Eliminated in the Battles

Coaches	Top 64 Artists					
David Bisbal						
David Bisbal	Alira Moya	Mario Márquez	Dayana Riverón	Paula Serrano	Colin Doljescu	Esther Benito
David Bisbal	~~Inés Pereira~~	Iker González	Minuto y Medio	Alexia Lucha	Arón Góngora	Claudia Blanco
David Bisbal	Iker Álvarez	Iván Ruiz	Juan Alonso	Julia Atucha	Luis Mosteo	
Lola Índigo						
Lola Índigo	Rafael Mateo	Aitana Velásquez	Alicia Scutelnicu	Astrid Verweij	Eugenia Garrido	Gisela Delgado
Lola Índigo	~~Mario Márquez~~	Carmen Holden	Luis Rodríguez	Ainara Romero	Carmen Cuevas	Cristina Falcón
Lola Índigo	Henar Gregori	Kyra Godínez	Nuria Peter	Sergio Plaza	Taina Gravier	
Rosario Flores						
Rosario Flores	Juan Francisco Morán	Rafael Amador	Estefanía Fernández	Nadia González	Alejandro Velasco	Celia Puntas
Rosario Flores	~~Aitana Velásquez~~	Daniel Grebenyuk	Ivet Costa	Amy Belén	Isabella Rivillas	Juan José Almagro
Rosario Flores	María López	María Moreno	Oriana Segura	Sergio Menchón	Vega Cano	
Melendi						
Melendi	Vera Lukash	Martina Fernández	Inés Pereira	Marc Moya	Curro Alcina	Lucas Santiago
Melendi	~~Nadia González~~	Aisha Alemán	Triana Pampliega	Alonso Jiménez	Amor López	Galileo Diges
Melendi	José David Martínez	Lucía Campos	Natalia Ruiz	Paula Desco	Samantha Bracho	
Note: Italicized names are stolen contestants (names struck through within former teams).

== Blind Auditions ==
Like last season, each coach has three blocks. When a coach presses the block button during a performance, the blocked coach's chair does not turn around. New this season is the superblock, which was created in the twelfth season of The Voice of France. The superblock is used after the performance is complete, and the coaches are pitching for the artist. The superblocked coach's chair turns back to the audience. Each coach has 2 superblocks each. Two coaches can be blocked in one audition.

✔	Coach pressed "QUIERO TU VOZ" button
	Artist elected to join this coach's team
	Artist defaulted to this coach's team
	Artist eliminated as no coach pressing "QUIERO TU VOZ" button
✘	Coach pressed "QUIERO TU VOZ" button, but was blocked by another coach from getting the artist
✘	Coach pressed "QUIERO TU VOZ" button, but was superblocked by another coach from getting the artist
	Blocked by David; Blocked by Lola; Blocked by Rosario; Blocked by Melendi

Episode	Order	Artist	Age	Song	Coach's and artist's choices			
Episode	Order	Artist	Age	Song	David	Lola	Rosario	Melendi
Episode 1 (13 April)	1	Minuto y Medio	8-13	"Feeling Good"	✔	✔	✔	✔
Episode 1 (13 April)	2	Vera Lukash	14	"Je t'aime"	✘	–	✔	✔
Episode 1 (13 April)	3	Cristina Falcón	10	"La última"	–	✔	✔	–
Episode 1 (13 April)	4	Rocío Castellano	8	"Hay algo especial en ti"	–	–	–	–
Episode 1 (13 April)	5	Juan José Almagro	12	"Limosna de amores"	✔	–	✔	–
Episode 1 (13 April)	6	Iker Álvarez	11	"Sweet Child o' Mine"	✔	✔	✔	✘
Episode 1 (13 April)	7	Valeria Ribada	9	"Qué hay más allá"	–	–	–	–
Episode 1 (13 April)	8	Astrid Verweij	11	"Se me olvidó otra vez"	–	✔	✔	✔
Episode 1 (13 April)	9	Triana Pampliega	10	"Cómo mirarte"	–	–	–	✔
Episode 1 (13 April)	10	Aitana Velásquez	13	"Somewhere Only We Know"	✔	✘	✔	✘
Episode 1 (13 April)	11	Rafael Amador	12	"Nana del caballo grande"	✔	✔	✔	✔
Episode 1 (13 April)	12	Nadia González	12	"Summertime"	✘	✔	✔	✔
Episode 1 (13 April)	13	Maxence Delafosse	11	"Destin"	–	–	–	–
Episode 1 (13 April)	14	Luis Rodríguez	12	"Libertad"	–	✔	–	–
Episode 2 (20 April)	1	Alira Moya	10	"Don't Stop Believin'"	✔	✔	–	✔
Episode 2 (20 April)	2	Luis Mosteo	12	"O mio babbino caro"	✔	✔	✔	✘
Episode 2 (20 April)	3	Carmen Cuevas	11	"Tu falta de querer"	✔	✔	✔	✔
Episode 2 (20 April)	4	Daniel Grebenyuk	7	"Still Loving You"	–	✔	✔	–
Episode 2 (20 April)	5	Alonso Jiménez	14	"Your Song"	–	–	✔	✔
Episode 2 (20 April)	6	Ana Morezuelas	12	"Sargento de hierro"	–	–	–	–
Episode 2 (20 April)	7	Eugenia Garrido	15	"One Night Only"	✘	✔	✔	✔
Episode 2 (20 April)	8	Vega Cano	7	"Esa cobardía"	– (Note: Rosario unintentionally turned her chair by accidentally pressing the button to block David on her chair. Rosario acquired the artist by default as no other coaches turned. However, the block did not count.)	–	✔	–
Episode 2 (20 April)	9	Dayana Riverón	14	"Te esperaba"	✔	–	–	✔
Episode 2 (20 April)	10	Pol Romero	12	"Perfect"	–	–	–	–
Episode 2 (20 April)	11	Gisela Delgado	9	"Quédate conmigo"	–	✔	✔	–
Episode 2 (20 April)	12	Juan Francisco Morán	15	"Cai"	✘	✔	✔	✔
Episode 2 (20 April)	13	Rocío Heredia	12	"No te pude retener"	–	–	–	–
Episode 2 (20 April)	14	Galileo Diges	15	"Another Love"	–	–	–	✔
Episode 3 (27 April)	1	Sergio Menchón	9	"Caruso"	–	–	✔	✔
Episode 3 (27 April)	2	Inés Pereira	15	"If I Ain't Got You"	✔	✔	✔	✔
Episode 3 (27 April)	3	Cesc Buil	8	"Cuando sea mayor"	–	–	–	–
Episode 3 (27 April)	4	Samantha Bracho	13	"I Put a Spell on You"	–	–	✔	✔
Episode 3 (27 April)	5	Ainara Romero	14	"La Llorona"	✔	✔	✔	✔
Episode 3 (27 April)	6	Isabella Rivillas	7	"Soy rebelde"	–	–	✔	–
Episode 3 (27 April)	7	Esther Benito	14	"Miedo"	✔	✔	–	–
Episode 3 (27 April)	8	Lucía & Carolina Piñeiro	14	"3 hojitas madre"	–	–	–	–
Episode 3 (27 April)	9	Taina Gravier	16	"Vivir así es morir de amor"	–	✔	–	–
Episode 3 (27 April)	10	Marc Moya	13	"Love in the Dark"	–	–	✘	✔
Episode 3 (27 April)	11	Alexia Lucha	14	"Stay"	✔	✔	✔	✔
Episode 3 (27 April)	12	Rafael Mateo	13	"Catalina"	✘	✔	✔	–
Episode 3 (27 April)	13	Alma Canu	9	"Parte de él"	–	–	–	–
Episode 3 (27 April)	14	Natalia Ruiz	14	"Leave the Door Open"	✔	–	✔	✔
Episode 4 (4 May)	1	Iker González	9	"Con la miel en los labios"	✔	✔	✔	✔
Episode 4 (4 May)	2	Amor López	11	"Me cuesta tanto ovidarte"	–	–	–	✔
Episode 4 (4 May)	3	Paula Serrano	13	"Never Enough"	✔	✔	✔	–
Episode 4 (4 May)	4	Alicia Scutelnicu	15	"Happier"	–	✔	–	–
Episode 4 (4 May)	5	Daniela González	7	"La gata bajo la lluvia"	–	–	–	–
Episode 4 (4 May)	6	Alejandro Velasco	13	"She Used to Be Mine"	–	–	✔	–
Episode 4 (4 May)	7	Julia Atucha	14	"On My Own"	✔	–	✔	–
Episode 4 (4 May)	8	Curro Alcina	12	"Nana triste"	–	–	–	✔
Episode 4 (4 May)	9	Cesc Buil	8	"Vas a quedarte"	–	–	–	–
Episode 4 (4 May)	10	María López	10	"Hopelessly Devoted to You"	–	✔	✔	–
Episode 4 (4 May)	11	José David Martínez	14	"Hijo de la Luna"	–	–	–	✔
Episode 4 (4 May)	12	Carmen Holden	11	"Always Remember Us This Way"	–	✔	–	–
Episode 4 (4 May)	13	Raúl Murillo	14	"Someone like You"	–	–	–	–
Episode 4 (4 May)	14	Ivet Costa	8	"Mañana"	–	–	✔	–
Episode 5 (18 May)	1	Juan Alonso	13	"Amor de San Juan"	✔	✔	✔	✔
Episode 5 (18 May)	2	Aisha Alemán	12	"All I Want"	–	–	✔	✔
Episode 5 (18 May)	3	Celia Puntas	10	"Ángel caído"	–	✔	✔	–
Episode 5 (18 May)	4	Oliver Catalá	10	"Traitor"	–	–	–	–
Episode 5 (18 May)	5	Martina Fernández	13	"Procuro olvidarte"	–	– (Note: Melendi blocked Lola, but Lola didn't turn so the block did not count.)	–	✔
Episode 5 (18 May)	6	Colin Doljescu	15	"It Had to Be You"	✔	–	–	–
Episode 5 (18 May)	7	Kyra Godínez	11	"Havana"	–	✔	–	–
Episode 5 (18 May)	8	Claudia Blanco	11	"I See Red"	✔	–	–	✔
Episode 5 (18 May)	9	Helena Almenar	11	"Smile"	–	–	–	–
Episode 5 (18 May)	10	Oriana Segura	13	"I'd Rather Go Blind"	–	–	✔	–
Episode 5 (18 May)	11	Sergio Plaza	13	"Mujer Contra Mujer"	–	✔	✔	–
Episode 5 (18 May)	12	Dana Belén	12	"Dernière danse"	–	–	–	–
Episode 5 (18 May)	13	Amy Belén	15	"Vuelvo a verte"	–	–	✔	✔
Episode 6 (25 May)	1	Iván Ruiz	12	"Te quiero niña"	✔	✔	✘	–
Episode 6 (25 May)	2	Henar Gregori	15	"All I Ask"	–	✔	✔	–
Episode 6 (25 May)	3	Lara Melero	12	"Wind of Change"	–	–	–	–
Episode 6 (25 May)	4	Lucas Santiago	15	"Halo"	–	–	–	✔
Episode 6 (25 May)	5	María Moreno	9	"¡Ay pena, penita pena!"	–	–	✔	–
Episode 6 (25 May)	6	Nuria Peter	14	"Back to Black"	–	✔	–	–
Episode 6 (25 May)	7	Rocío Quevedo	11	"Contigo"	–	–	–	–
Episode 6 (25 May)	8	Arón Góngora	8	"La gloria de Deus"	✔	–	✔	✔
Episode 6 (25 May)	9	Lucía Campos	10	"Vas a quedarte"	Team Full	–	–	✔
Episode 6 (25 May)	10	Estefanía Fernández	13	"Dernière danse"	Team Full	✘	✔	✔
Episode 6 (25 May)	11	Claudia Pina	10	"Another Love"	Team Full	–	Team Full	–
Episode 6 (25 May)	12	Mario Márquez	14	"Solamente tú"	Team Full	✔	Team Full	–
Episode 6 (25 May)	13	Kidest Borlaf	10	"What's Love Got to Do with It"	Team Full	Team Full	Team Full	–
Episode 6 (25 May)	14	Paula Desco	10	"If Only"	Team Full	Team Full	Team Full	✔

== Great Battles ==
The great battles aired on 8 June 2024. This season, the artists are placed in groups of four and their coach elects to take two of the four to the Knockouts. Unlike previous seasons, there are no steals in this round. In addition, coaches' advisors help them on deciding who will be advancing to the next round; Álvaro Soler for Team David, Judeline for Team Lola, El Kanka for Team Rosario, and Mau & Ricky for Team Melendi.

Battles color key
Artist was chosen by his/her coach to advance to the Knockouts
Artist was eliminated

=== Episode 7 (8 June) ===
Seventh episode's results
Order	Coach	Winner	Songs	Losers
1	Lola Índigo	Carmen Holden	"Wannabe"	Kyra Godínez
1	Lola Índigo	Gisela Delgado	"Wannabe"	Carmen Cuevas
2	Lola Índigo	Luis Rodríguez	"+ (Más)"	Sergio Plaza
2	Lola Índigo	Rafael Mateo	"+ (Más)"	Cristina Falcón
3	Lola Índigo	Alicia Scutelnicu	"Domino"	Henar Gregori
3	Lola Índigo	Eugenia Garrido	"Domino"	Nuria Peter
4	Lola Índigo	Mario Márquez	"Consejo de Amor"	Taina Gravier
4	Lola Índigo	Astrid Verweij	"Consejo de Amor"	Ainara Romero
5	Rosario Flores	Celia Puntas	"Ahora Te Puedes Marchar"	Isabella Rivillas
5	Rosario Flores	Ivet Costa	"Ahora Te Puedes Marchar"	Vega Cano
6	Rosario Flores	Aitana Velásquez	"I'm Every Woman"	Amy Belén
6	Rosario Flores	Estefanía Fernández	"I'm Every Woman"	Oriana Segura
7	Rosario Flores	Daniel Grebenyuk	"The Shoop Shoop Song"	María López
7	Rosario Flores	Alejandro Velasco	"The Shoop Shoop Song"	Sergio Menchón
8	Rosario Flores	Juan Francisco Morán	"Válgame Dios	María Moreno
8	Rosario Flores	Rafael Amador	"Válgame Dios	Juan José Almagro
9	Melendi	Aisha Alemán	"Where Is the Love?"	Alonso Jiménez
9	Melendi	Lucas Santiago	"Where Is the Love?"	Galileo Diges
10	Melendi	Curro Alcina	"Oye"	José David Martínez
10	Melendi	Triana Pampliega	"Oye"	Amor López
11	Melendi	Martina Fernández	"Sign of the Times"	Natalia Ruiz
11	Melendi	Vera Lukash	"Sign of the Times"	Paula Desco
12	Melendi	Nadia González	"Arcade"	Lucía Campos
12	Melendi	Marc Moya	"Arcade"	Samantha Bracho
13	David Bisbal	Colin Doljescu	"Easy on Me"	Luis Mosteo
13	David Bisbal	Minuto y Medio	"Easy on Me"	Iker Álvarez
14	David Bisbal	Dayana Riverón	"Mía"	Iván Ruiz
14	David Bisbal	Esther Benito	"Mía"	Juan Alonso
15	David Bisbal	Inés Pereira	"Give Your Heart a Break"	Alexia Lucha
15	David Bisbal	Paula Serrano	"Give Your Heart a Break"	Julia Atucha
16	David Bisbal	Alira Moya	"Invisible"	Arón Góngora
16	David Bisbal	Iker González	"Invisible"	Claudia Blanco

== Knockouts ==
=== Phase 1 ===
Phase 1 of the Knockouts aired on 15 and 22 June.

In the first phase, the eight artists on each team will perform one by one, singing their blind audition song. Two artists will receive the 'Fast-Pass (Pase Directo)' and directly advance to the semi-final. Three artists will be put in the 'Danger Zone' where they will compete for one remaining spot in the second phase. In addition, each coach was given a 'Steal' to get an artist from another team to advance to the Lives. Once an artist is announced to be put into the 'Danger Zone', the coach whose 'Steal' is still available will have the chance to steal the artist. Artists who got stolen will automatically advance to the semi-final. After an artist got stolen, the coach of the team then chooses another artist for the 'Danger Zone'. This procedure comes to an end once there are three artists officially in the 'Danger Zone'. The remaining artists will be eliminated in this round and won't have the chance to compete next week.

The first episode of the Knockouts features Team David and Team Lola. Both coaches performed a song together with their advisor before their artists began to perform. David Bisbal and his advisor Álvaro Soler performed "A Contracorriente". Lola Índigo and her advisor Judeline took the stage with "Santería".

The second episode of the Knockouts features Team Rosario and Team Melendi. Both coaches performed a song together with their advisor before their artists began to perform. Rosario Flores and her advisor El Kanka performed "Vivir y Soñar". Melendi and his advisor Mau & Ricky sang "La Boca Junta" together.

Knockouts (Phase 1) color key
Artist got a 'Fast-Pass' and advanced to the semi-final
Artist was stolen by another coach and advanced to the semi-final
Artist put in the 'Danger Zone' and entered Phase 2
Artist was eliminated

Knockouts Results
Episode	Coach	Order	Artist	Song	Results
Episode 8 (15 June)	David Bisbal	1	Minuto y Medio	"Feeling Good"	Eliminated
Episode 8 (15 June)	David Bisbal	2	Dayana Riverón	"Te esperaba"	Fast-Pass
Episode 8 (15 June)	David Bisbal	3	Alira Moya	"Don't Stop Believin'"	Fast-Pass
Episode 8 (15 June)	David Bisbal	4	Colin Doljescu	"It Had to Be You"	Danger Zone
Episode 8 (15 June)	David Bisbal	5	Esther Benito	"Miedo"	Danger Zone
Episode 8 (15 June)	David Bisbal	6	Iker González	"Con la miel en los labios"	Eliminated
Episode 8 (15 June)	David Bisbal	7	Inés Pereira	"If I Ain't Got You"	Stolen by Melendi
Episode 8 (15 June)	David Bisbal	8	Paula Serrano	"Never Enough"	Danger Zone
Episode 8 (15 June)	Lola Índigo	9	Mario Márquez	"Solamente tú"	Stolen by David
Episode 8 (15 June)	Lola Índigo	10	Alicia Scutelnicu	"Happier"	Fast-Pass
Episode 8 (15 June)	Lola Índigo	11	Luis Rodríguez	"Libertad"	Eliminated
Episode 8 (15 June)	Lola Índigo	12	Rafael Mateo	"Catalina"	Fast-Pass
Episode 8 (15 June)	Lola Índigo	13	Astrid Verweij	"Se me olvidó otra vez"	Danger Zone
Episode 8 (15 June)	Lola Índigo	14	Carmen Holden	"Always Remember Us This Way"	Eliminated
Episode 8 (15 June)	Lola Índigo	15	Gisela Delgado	"Quédate conmigo"	Danger Zone
Episode 8 (15 June)	Lola Índigo	16	Eugenia Garrido	"One Night Only"	Danger Zone
Episode 9 (22 June)	Rosario Flores	1	Estefanía Fernández	"Dernière danse"	Fast-Pass
Episode 9 (22 June)	Rosario Flores	2	Celia Puntas	"Ángel caído"	Danger Zone
Episode 9 (22 June)	Rosario Flores	3	Aitana Velásquez	"Somewhere Only We Know"	Stolen by Lola
Episode 9 (22 June)	Rosario Flores	4	Daniel Grebenyuk	"Still Loving You"	Eliminated
Episode 9 (22 June)	Rosario Flores	5	Rafael Amador	"Nana del caballo grande"	Fast-Pass
Episode 9 (22 June)	Rosario Flores	6	Ivet Costa	"Mañana"	Eliminated
Episode 9 (22 June)	Rosario Flores	7	Juan Francisco Morán	"Cai"	Danger Zone
Episode 9 (22 June)	Rosario Flores	8	Alejandro Velasco	"She Used to Be Mine"	Danger Zone
Episode 9 (22 June)	Melendi	9	Marc Moya	"Love in the Dark"	Fast-Pass
Episode 9 (22 June)	Melendi	10	Curro Alcina	"Nana triste"	Danger Zone
Episode 9 (22 June)	Melendi	11	Vera Lukash	"Je t'aime"	Fast-Pass
Episode 9 (22 June)	Melendi	12	Triana Pampliega	"Cómo mirarte"	Eliminated
Episode 9 (22 June)	Melendi	13	Nadia González	"Summertime"	Stolen by Rosario
Episode 9 (22 June)	Melendi	14	Lucas Santiago	"Halo"	Danger Zone
Episode 9 (22 June)	Melendi	15	Martina Fernández	"Procuro olvidarte"	Danger Zone
Episode 9 (22 June)	Melendi	16	Aisha Alemán	"All I Want"	Eliminated

=== Phase 2 ===
Phase 2 of the Knockouts aired 29 June.

In the second phase, the remaining three artists on each team that were placed in the 'Danger Zone' in the first phase perform individually for the final spot left on their coaches' team in the semi-final. At the end of the round, only one artist moves on and the other two are eliminated from the competition. The coaches' advisors once again were present in this round to help aid in decisions.

Knockouts (Phase 2) color key
Artist was saved by his/her coach and advanced to the semi-final
Artist was eliminated

Final Knockouts Results
Episode	Coach	Order	Artist	Song	Result
Episode 10 (29 June)	Lola Índigo	1	Gisela Delgado	"My Heart Will Go On"	Eliminated
Episode 10 (29 June)	Lola Índigo	2	Astrid Verweij	"La despedida"	Lola's Choice
Episode 10 (29 June)	Lola Índigo	3	Eugenia Garrido	"Almost Is Never Enough"	Eliminated
Episode 10 (29 June)	Melendi	4	Lucas Santiago	"Enchanted"	Eliminated
Episode 10 (29 June)	Melendi	5	Curro Alcina	"Cuántas veces"	Eliminated
Episode 10 (29 June)	Melendi	6	Martina Fernández	"Con las ganas"	Melendi's Choice
Episode 10 (29 June)	Rosario Flores	7	Celia Puntas	"Si a veces hablo de ti"	Eliminated
Episode 10 (29 June)	Rosario Flores	8	Alejandro Velasco	"Deja Vu"	Eliminated
Episode 10 (29 June)	Rosario Flores	9	Juan Francisco Morán	"El alma al aire"	Rosario's Choice
Episode 10 (29 June)	David Bisbal	10	Esther Benito	"Seaside"	Eliminated
Episode 10 (29 June)	David Bisbal	11	Colin Doljescu	"You Are the Reason"	Eliminated
Episode 10 (29 June)	David Bisbal	12	Paula Serrano	"The Greatest Love of All"	David's Choice

== Final phase ==
=== Week 1: Semi-final (6 July) ===
Semi-final color key
Artist advanced to the Finale
Artist was chosen by his/her coach to advance to the Finale
Artist was eliminated

Order	Coach	Artist	Song	Result
1	David Bisbal	Alira Moya	"What a Feeling"	Advanced
2	David Bisbal	Dayana Riverón	"Por Volverte a Ver"	Eliminated
3	David Bisbal	Paula Serrano	"Run"	Eliminated
4	David Bisbal	Mario Márquez	"Y Ya Te Quería"	David's Choice
5	Rosario Flores	Estefanía Fernández	"The House of the Rising Sun"	Eliminated
6	Rosario Flores	Rafael Amador	"Armadora"	Rosario's Choice
7	Rosario Flores	Nadia González	"Killing Me Softly"	Eliminated
8	Rosario Flores	Juan Francisco Morán	"Entre Sobras Y Sobras Me Faltas"	Advanced
9	Melendi	Inés Pereira	"Stay with Me"	Eliminated
10	Melendi	Marc Moya	"lovely"	Eliminated
11	Melendi	Vera Lukash	"Rise Up"	Advanced
12	Melendi	Martina Fernández	"Aunque Tú No Lo Sepas"	Melendi's Choice
13	Lola Índigo	Alicia Scutelnicu	"Vampire"	Eliminated
14	Lola Índigo	Rafael Mateo	"A Tu Vera"	Lola's Choice
15	Lola Índigo	Astrid Verweij	"Recuérdame"	Eliminated
16	Lola Índigo	Aitana Velásquez	"Grenade"	Advanced

=== Week 2: Finale (13 July) ===
==== Round one ====
Finale color key
Artist was chosen by his/her coach to advance to round two
Artist was eliminated

Order	Coach	Artist	Song	Duet with team advisor	Result
1	David Bisbal	Mario Marquez	"Se nos rompio el amor"	"Muero" (with Álvaro Soler)	Eliminated
2	David Bisbal	Alira Moya	"Empiezo a recordate"	"Muero" (with Álvaro Soler)	David's choice
3	Lola Índigo	Aitana Velásquez	"Good 4 U"	"Historia de un Amor" (with Judeline)	Eliminated
4	Lola Índigo	Rafael Mateo	"Juro Que"	"Historia de un Amor" (with Judeline)	Lola's choice
5	Melendi	Martina Fernández	"Try"	"Pasado Mañana" (with Mau y Ricky)	Eliminated
6	Melendi	Vera Lukash	"Je suis malade"	"Pasado Mañana" (with Mau y Ricky)	Melendi's choice
7	Rosario Flores	Rafael Amador	"Como El Agua"	"Canelita en rama" (with El Kanka)	Eliminated
8	Rosario Flores	Juan Francisco Morán	"Desde la Azotea"	"Canelita en rama" (with El Kanka)	Rosario's choice

==== Round two ====
Order	Coach	Artist	Duet with coach	Result
1	Lola Índigo	Rafael Mateo	"Mala Suerte"	Third Place
2	Melendi	Vera Lukash	"Con solo una sonrisa"	Fourth Place
3	Rosario Flores	Juan Francisco Morán	"Te quiero, te quiero"	Runner-up
4	David Bisbal	Alira Moya	"Me siento vivo"	Winner

=== Overall ===
Color key
Artist's info

- Team David
- Team Lola
- Team Rosario
- Team Melendi

Result details

- Winner
- Runner-up
- Third Place
- Fourth Place
- Saved by the public
- Saved by the coach
- Eliminated

Live Show Results per week
Artists	Semifinal, Top 8	Grand finale	
Alira Moya	Safe	Safe	Winner
Juan Francisco Morán	Safe	Safe	Runner-up
Rafael Mateo	Safe	Safe	Third Place
Vera Lukash	Safe	Safe	Fourth Place
Aitana Velásquez	Safe	Eliminated	Eliminated (Round One)
Mario Márquez	Safe	Eliminated	Eliminated (Round One)
Martina Fernández	Safe	Eliminated	Eliminated (Round One)
Rafael Amador	Safe	Eliminated	Eliminated (Round One)
Alicia Scutelnicu	Eliminated	Eliminated (Semifinal)	
Astrid Verweij	Eliminated	Eliminated (Semifinal)	
Dayana Riverón	Eliminated	Eliminated (Semifinal)	
Estefanía Fernández	Eliminated	Eliminated (Semifinal)	
Inés Pereira	Eliminated	Eliminated (Semifinal)	
Marc Moya	Eliminated	Eliminated (Semifinal)	
Nadia González	Eliminated	Eliminated (Semifinal)	
Paula Serrano	Eliminated	Eliminated (Semifinal)	
