= Premios Oye! 2009 =

8th Gala Premios Oye!
- Date: November 24, 2009
- Location: Centro de Convenciones, Guanajuato, Guanajuato
- Hosted by: Yuri and Jorge Poza

Television/radio coverage
- Network: Televisa

The eighth Premios Oye! took place at the Auditorio del Estado in Guanajuato, Guanajuato on November 24, 2009. The nominees were announced on September 29 with Alexander Acha and Banda el Recodo receiving 4 nominations, followed by Fanny Lu, Jenni Rivera, Vicente Fernández and Zoé with 3 each one. It will be celebrated in Guanajuato in order to commemorate the 200th Anniversary of the Mexican Independence Day Grito de Dolores. Rapahel will be awarded by the Academia Nacional de la Música en México for his 50 years or career. The voting process is certified by PricewaterhouseCoopers.

== Arrivals ==
- Alejandra Espinoza
- Aleks Syntek
- Alexander Acha
- Altair Jarabo
- Ana Bárbara
- Angelique Boyer
- Danna Paola
- Danny Daniel
- Eiza González
- Eleazar Gómez
- Erik Rubin
- Eugenio Siller
- Javier Poza
- Kumbia All Starz
- La Autentica de Jerez
- La Quinta Estación
- Lidia Avila
- Los Super Reyes
- Los Tigres del Norte
- Luis Fonsi
- Luis Lauro
- Lucía Méndez
- Mariana Avila
- María José
- Mayra Albor
- Nadia
- Paty Cantú
- Paulina Rubio
- Sebastián Zurita
- Shaila Dúrcal
- Tush
- Yuridia
- Yuri
- Zoé

== Performers ==
- Los Super Reyes & Kumbia All Starz & Kumbia Kings - Tu Magia / Chica Fatal / No Tengo Dinero
- Danna Paola & Atrévete a Soñar - Welcome / Superstars / Mundo De Caramelo
- Alexander Acha - Te Amo
- María José - Adelante Corazón / No Soy Una Señora
- Tush - Acostumbrado
- Danny Daniel - Vete Ya
- Los Tigres del Norte - La Granja
- Paty Cantú - Déjame Ir
- Luis Fonsi - No Me Doy Por Vencido
- Shaila Dúrcal - La Media Vuelta / Si Nos Dejan
- Ana Bárbara - Rompiendo Cadenas
- Zoé - Nada
- Raphael - Volver, Volver / La Fuerza Del Corazón
- Paulina Rubio - Ni Rosas Ni Juguetes / Causa y Efecto
- Yuri & Yuridia - La Maldita Primavera

== General Field ==
=== Album of the Year ===
- (Mexico) 20 Años en Vivo — Aleks Syntek
  - Aleks Syntek, producer.
- (Puerto Rico) Los de Atrás Vienen Conmigo — Calle 13
  - Elías de León, producer.
- (Spain) Sin Frenos — La Quinta Estación
  - Armando Ávila, producer.
- (Puerto Rico) La Revolución — Wisin & Yandel
  - Juan Luis Morera & Llander Veguilla, producers.
- (Mexico) Reptilectric — Zoé
  - Phil Vinall & Zoé, producers.

=== Record of the Year ===
- (Mexico) "Mañana es para siempre" — J. Eduardo Murguia & Mauricio L. Arriaga, songwriters (Alejandro Fernández)
- (Mexico) "Te Amo" - Alexander Acha, songwriter (Alexander Acha)
- (Puerto Rico) (Mexico) "No Hay Nadie Como Tú" — Eduardo Cabra, Emanuel Del Real Díaz, Enrique Rangel Arroyo, José Alfredo Rangel Arroyo, René Pérez & Rubén Albarrán Ortega, songwriters (Calle 13 featuring Café Tacvba)
- (Colombia) "Tu No Eres Para Mi" - Fanny Lu, Andrés Munera & José Gavira, songwriters (Fanny Lu)
- (Puerto Rico) "No Me Doy Por Vencido" - Luis Fonsi & Claudia Brant, songwriters (Luis Fonsi)

=== Best New Artist ===
- (Mexico) Voy — Alexander Acha
- (Chile) Miedo Escénico — Beto Cuevas
- (Mexico) Me Quedo Sola — Paty Cantú
- (Mexico) Tush — Tush
- (Brazil) Nada Es Normal — Victor & Leo

== Pop Field ==
=== Best Male Pop ===
- (Mexico) 20 Años En Vivo — Aleks Syntek
- (Mexico) Voy — Alexander Acha
- (Puerto Rico) Vivo — Chayanne
- (Puerto Rico) Palabras Del Silencio — Luis Fonsi
- (Mexico) Que Vueltas Da La Vida — Reyli

=== Best Female Pop ===
- (Colombia) Dos — Fanny Lu
- (Italy) Primavera Anticipada — Laura Pausini
- (Mexico) Amante de lo Ajeno — María José
- (Mexico) Hu Hu Hu — Natalia Lafourcade
- (Mexico) Me Quedo Sola — Paty Cantú

=== Best Pop by a Duo/Group ===
- (Mexico) Tour Fantasia Pop — Belanova
- (Puerto Rico) Los de Atrás Vienen Conmigo — Calle 13
- (United States) Habitación Doble — Ha*Ash
- (Spain) Sin Frenos — La Quinta Estación
- (Puerto Rico) La Revolución — Wisin & Yandel

== Rock Field ==
=== Best Rock by a Duo/Group or Solo ===
- (Argentina) Mucho + — Babasónicos
- (Chile) Miedo Escénico — Beto Cuevas
- (Mexico) Barracuda — Kinky
- (Mexico) Queremos Rock — Moderatto
- (Mexico) Reptilectric — Zoé

== English Field ==
=== Album of the Year ===
- (United States) I Am... Sasha Fierce — Beyoncé
  - Matthew Knowles & Beyoncé Knowles, producers.
- (United States) Circus — Britney Spears
  - Teresa "LaBarbera" Whites & Larry Rudolph, producers.
- (United Kingdom) Prospekt's March EP — Coldplay
  - Markus Dravs, Brian Eno & Rik Simpson, producers.
- (United States) The Fame — Lady Gaga
  - Vincent Herbert, producer.
- (Republic of Ireland) No Line on the Horizon — U2
  - Bryan Eno, Danny Lanois & Steve Lilly White, producers.

=== Record of the Year ===
- (United States) "Single Ladies" — Beyoncé Knowles, Christopher Stuart, Terius Nash & Thaddis Harrell, songwriters (Beyoncé)
- (United States) "Womanizer" - Nikesha Briscoe & Raphael Akinyemi, songwriters (Britney Spears)
- (United Kingdom) "Life in Technicolor II" — Guy Berryman, Jonny Buckland, Will Champion & Chris Martin, songwriters (Coldplay)
- (United States) "Poker Face" - Lady Gaga & RedOne, songwriters (Lady Gaga)
- (Republic of Ireland) "Get On Your Boots" - U2, songwriters (U2)

=== Best New Artist ===
- (United States) Don't Forget — Demi Lovato
- (United States) One of the Boys — Katy Perry
- (United States) The Fame — Lady Gaga
- (United Kingdom) We Started Nothing — The Ting Tings
- (Australia) Hook Me Up — The Veronicas

== Popular Field ==
=== Album of the Year ===
- (Mexico) Te Presumo — Banda el Recodo
  - Fonovisa Records & María de Jesús Lizárraga, producers.
- (Argentina) Mexicano Hasta Las Pampas — Diego Verdaguer
  - Joan Sebastian, producer.
- (Mexico) Jenni — Jenni Rivera
  - Jenni Rivera, producer.
- (Mexico) Más Adelante — La Arrolladora Banda El Limón
  - Fernando Camacho, producer.
- (Mexico) Primera Fila — Vicente Fernández
  - Gustavo Borner, producer.

=== Record of the Year ===
- (Mexico) "Te Presumo" — Husseín Barrera, songwriter (Banda el Recodo)
- (Mexico) "El Mechón" - Abraham Núñez Narváez, songwriter (Banda Sinaloense MS)
- (Mexico) "Culpable ó Inocente" — Camilo Blanes, songwriter (Jenni Rivera)
- (Mexico) "Ya Es Muy Tarde" — Horacio Palencia, songwriter (La Arrolladora Banda El Limón)
- (Mexico) "El Último Beso" — Joan Sebastian, songwriter (Vicente Fernández)

=== Best New Artist ===
- (Colombia) Hechizando — Danny Daniel
- (Mexico) Mis Éxitos Con Acordeón Y Tololoche — Espinoza Paz
- (Mexico) Vámonos Pa'l Río — Los Pikadientes de Caborca
- (Mexico) Nueva Ilusión — Majestad de la Sierra
- (Mexico) Rudo y Cursi — Tato "El Cursi" Verduzco (Gael García Bernal)

=== Best Norteño by a Duo/Group or Solo ===
- (Mexico) Se Renta Un Corazón — Cardenales De Nuevo León
- (Mexico) Mentir Por Amor — Conjunto Primavera
- (Mexico) Mi Complemento — Los Huracanes del Norte
- (Mexico) Tu Noche con Los Tigres del Norte — Los Tigres del Norte
- (Mexico) Sólo Contigo — Pesado

=== Best Grupero by a Duo/Group or Solo ===
- (Mexico) El Mundo No Se Detiene — El Gigante De América
- (Mexico) Cada Vez Más Fuerte — Liberación
- (Mexico) Los Temerarios — Los Temerarios
- (Mexico) Si Tú Te Vas — Los Temerarios
- (Mexico) No Molestar — Marco Antonio Solís

=== Best Ranchero by a Duo/Group or Solo ===
- (Argentina) Mexicano Hasta las Pampas — Diego Verdaguer
- (Mexico) Acaríciame — Mayra
- (Mexico) A Puro Dolor — Nadia
- (Spain) Corazón Ranchero — Shaila Dúrcal
- (Mexico) Primera Fila — Vicente Fernández

=== Best Banda/Duranguense by a Duo/Group or Solo ===
- (Mexico) Te Presumo — Banda el Recodo
- (Mexico) Una Poesía — Banda Pequeños Musical
- (Mexico) Jenni — Jenni Rivera
- (Mexico) Como Un Tatauje — K-Paz de la Sierra
- (Mexico) Más Adelante — La Arrolladora Banda El Limón

=== Best Tropical by a Duo/Group or Solo ===
- (Colombia) Hechizando — Danny Daniel
- (Mexico) Flor De Mayo — Grupo Cañaveral
- (Colombia) El Vicio De Tu Boca — La Sonora Dinamita
- (Mexico) Luna Desnuda — Los Ángeles de Charly
- (United States) Cumbia Con Soul — Cruz Martínez presenta Los Super Reyes

== Video of the Year Field ==
=== Video in Spanish ===
- (Mexico) Te Amo — Alexander Acha
  - Esteban Madrazo, video director; LGA Entertainment, video producer
- (Mexico) Te Presumo — Banda el Recodo
  - Nene González, video director; LGA Entertainment, video producer
- (Colombia) "Tu No Eres Para Mi" - Fanny Lu
  - Simón Brand, video director; Mauricio Osorio, video producer
- (Mexico) Causa y Efecto — Paulina Rubio
  - P. Blond, video director; Art And Music, video producer
- (Mexico) Nada — Zoé
  - Alejandro Romero "Chicle", video director

== Theme from a Telenovela, Movie or T.V. Series ==
=== Theme of the year in Spanish ===
- (Mexico) "Mundo De Caramelo" — Pedro Dabdoub & Carlos Law, songwriters (Danna Paola)
  - Luis de Llano Macedo, producer (Atrevete a Soñar)
- (Italy) "En Cambio No" - Laura Pausini & Paolo Carta, songwriters (Laura Pausini)
  - Carlos Moreno Laguillo, producer (En Nombre del Amor)
- (Spain) "Juro Que Te Amo" — J. Eduardo Murguía & Mauricio L. Arriaga, songwriters (David Bisbal)
  - Mapat, producer (Juro Que Te Amo)
- (Mexico) "Mañana Es Para Siempre" - J. Eduardo Murguía & Mauricio L. Arriaga, songwriters (Alejandro Fernández)
  - Nicandro Díaz González & Mary Carmen Marcos, producers (Mañana es para siempre)
- (Mexico) "Quiero Que Me Quieras" - Rick Nielsen, Mario Lafontaine & Carlos Cuarón, songwriters (Gael García Bernal)
  - Alejandro González Iñárritu, Guillermo del Toro & Alfonso Cuarón, producers (Rudo y Cursi)
- (Mexico) "Un Gancho Al Corazón" — Alonzo & Ángela Dávalos, songwriters (Playa Limbo)
  - Angelli Nesma Medina, producer (Un Gancho al Corazón)

== Best Song with a Message ==
- (Mexico) Canción Optimista — Chetes
- (Spain) Europa VII — La Oreja de Van Gogh
- (Puerto Rico) No me doy por vencido — Luis Fonsi

== Audience Award ==
- (Mexico) — Paulina Rubio

== Tribute to the artistic ==
- Raphael

== Special Tribute ==
- Maestro Manuel Esperon
