= Danna Paola discography =

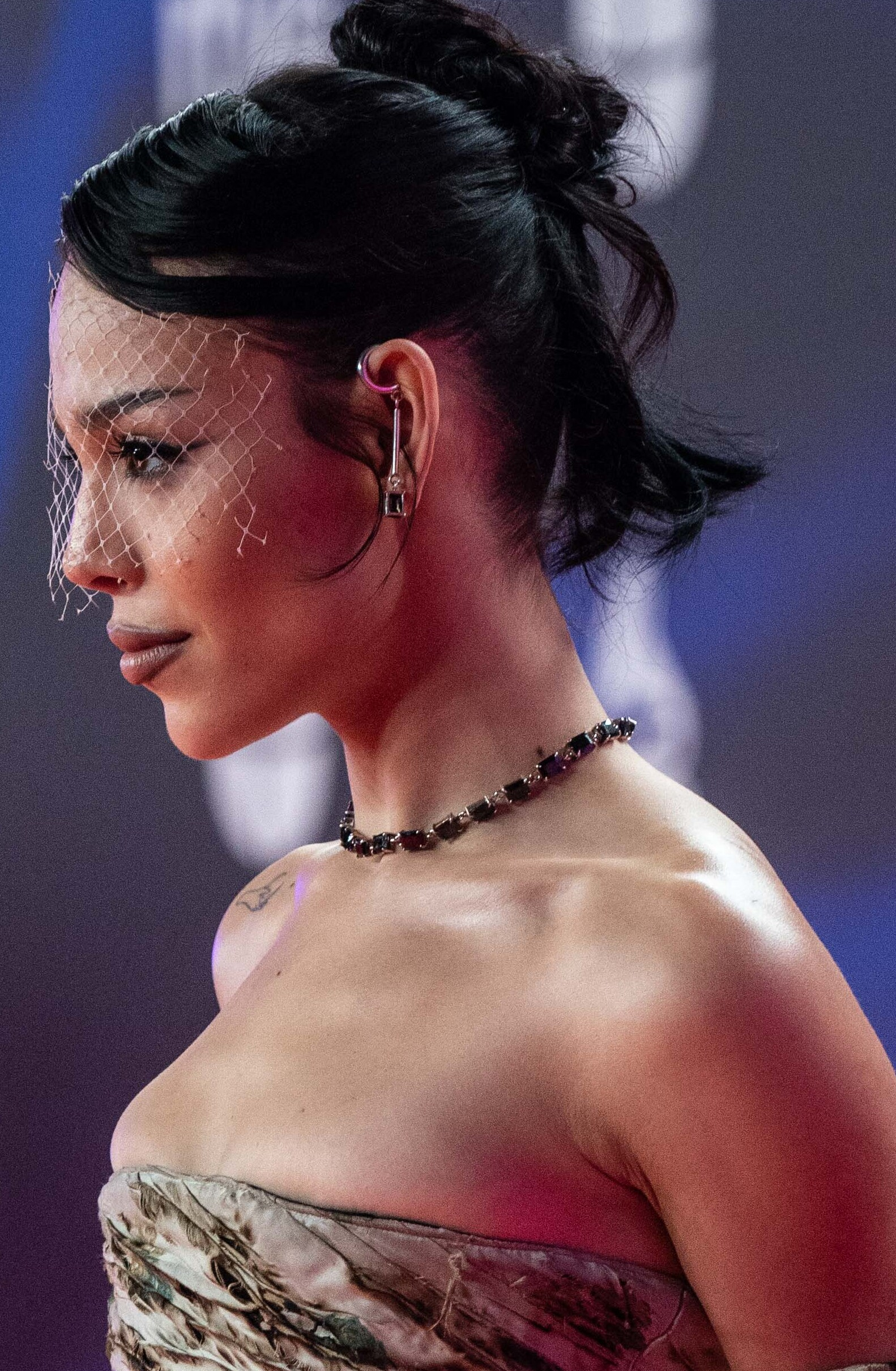
- Studio albums: 8
- EPs: 4
- Soundtrack albums: 5
- Live albums: 1
- Compilation albums: 2
- Singles: 47
- Video albums: 2
- Music videos: 24
- Karaoke albums: 1
- DVDs: 4
- Promotional singles: 10
- Featured artist: 2

The discography of Danna Paola, Mexican actress and singer, consists of eight studio albums, four extended plays (EP's), one live album, two video albums, two compilation albums, five soundtracks, and forty-seven singles.

== Albums ==
=== Studio albums ===
List of studio albums, with selected details, chart positions and certifications
Title	Studio album details	Peaks			Certifications
Title	Studio album details	SPA	US Latin	US Latin Pop	Certifications
Mi Globo Azul	Released: 1 January 2002; Label: Universal Mexico; Formats: CD, digital download, streaming	—	—	—	
Océano	Released: 23 November 2004; Label: Universal Mexico; Formats: CD, digital download, streaming	—	46	13	
Chiquita Pero Picosa	Released: 12 April 2005; Label: Universal Mexico; Formats: CD, digital download, streaming	—	—	—	
Danna Paola	Released: 5 June 2012; Label: Universal Mexico; Formats: CD, digital download, streaming	—	—	—	
Sie7e +	Released: 7 February 2020; Label: Universal Mexico; Formats: CD, digital download, streaming	—	—	16	AMPROFON: 4× Platinum; IFPI CA: Platinum
K.O.	Released: 13 January 2021; Label: Universal Mexico; Formats: CD, digital download, streaming	81	—	9	AMPROFON: Platinum; CAPIF: Platinum
Childstar	Released: 11 April 2024; Label: Veo Sonora, Universal Mexico; Format: CD, LP, digital download, streaming	—	—	16	AMPROFON: Platinum
Visions	Released: TBA; Label: Universal Mexico; Format: CD, digital download, streaming	—	—	—	
"—" denotes a single that did not chart or was not released.

=== Live albums ===
List of live albums
Title	Album details
Atrévete a Soñar: El Concierto	Released: 16 February 2010; Label: Universal Music; Formats: CD+DVD, digital download, streaming

=== Video albums ===
List of video albums
Title	Album details
Amy, la Niña de la Mochila Azul: En Concierto	Released: 15 March 2005; Label: Universal Music; Formats: DVD
Danna Paola En Vivo	Released: 16 August 2006; Label: Universal Music; Formats: DVD

=== Compilation albums ===
List of compilation albums
Title	Album details
Lo Mejor de Amy, la Niña de la Mochila Azul	Released: 6 December 2005; Label: Universal Music; Formats: CD, DVD
Atrévete a Soñar 1.5	Released: 1 October 2009; Label: Universal Music; Formats: CD, DVD

=== Karaoke albums ===
List of karaoke albums
Title	Album details
Canta como Danna Paola	Released: 13 September 2005; Label: Universal Music; Formats: CD, digital download, streaming

== Extended plays ==
List of extended plays
Title	Album details
Danna Paola	Released: 25 September 2007; Label: Universal Mexico; Formats: CD, digital download, streaming
Sie7e	Released: 17 May 2019; Label: Universal Mexico; Formats: CD, digital download, streaming
Lucid Dreams	Released: 14 April 2026; Label: Universal Mexico; Formats: Digital download, streaming
Wet Dreams	Released: 27 August 2026; Label: Universal Mexico; Formats: Digital download, streaming

== Soundtracks ==
List of soundtracks
Title	Album details	Sales	Certifications (sales thresholds)
Amy, la Niña de la Mochila Azul Vol. 1	Released: 28 September 2004; Label: Universal Music; Formats: CD, digital download, streaming	MEX: 50,000	AMPROFON: Gold
Amy, la Niña de la Mochila Azul Vol. 2	Released: 26 October 2004; Label: Universal Music; Formats: CD, digital download, streaming	MEX: 50,000	AMPROFON: Gold
Pablo y Andrea	Released: 29 August 2005; Label: Universal Music; Formats: CD, digital download, streaming		
Atrévete a Soñar	Released: 16 April 2009; Label: Universal Music; Formats: CD, digital download, streaming	MEX: 80,000	AMPROFON: Platinum
Atrévete a Soñar 2	Released: 3 October 2009; Label: Universal Music; Formats: CD, digital download, streaming	MEX: 80,000	AMPROFON: Platinum

== DVDs ==
List of DVDs
Title	DVD details
María Belén y sus Amigos	Released: 18 March 2003; Label: Universal Music; Formats: DVD
Viviendo Atrévete a Soñar	Released: 16 August 2009; Label: Universal Music; Formats: DVD
Viviendo Atrévete a Soñar 2	Released: 2010; Label: Universal Music; Formats: DVD

VHS
Title	Album details
Mi Globo Azul	Released: 2001; Label: Universal Music; Formats: VHS

== Singles ==
=== 2000s ===
List of singles, showing year released and album name
Title	Year	Album
"Azul Como El Cielo"	2004	Amy, la Niña de la Mochila Azul Vol. 1
"Chiquita Pero Picosa"	2005	Chiquita Pero Picosa
"Un Paso Atrás"	2005	Chiquita Pero Picosa
"La Chica Ye-ye"	2005	Chiquita Pero Picosa
"Junto a Ti"	2005	Pablo y Andrea
"Es Mejor"	2007	Danna Paola - EP
"Mundo de Caramelo"	2008	Danna Paola - EP
"Dame Corazón"	2008	Danna Paola - EP
"El Primer Día Sin Ti"	2009	Danna Paola - EP
"De Aquí Para Allá"	2009	Danna Paola - EP

=== 2010s and 2020s ===
List of singles as lead artist, with selected chart positions, certifications and album name
Title	Year	Peak chart positions										Certifications	Album
Title	Year	MEX	MEX Pop	ARG	COL	CR	ECU	NIC	PAN	SPA	US Latin Pop	Certifications	Album
"Yo Soy Tu Amigo Fiel" (with Aleks Syntek)	2010	—	—	—	—	—	—	—	—	—	—		Toy Story 3
"Ruleta"	2012	46	20	—	—	—	—	—	—	—	—		Danna Paola
"Todo Fue Un Show"	2012	17	6	—	—	—	—	—	—	—	—		Danna Paola
"No Es Cierto" (featuring Noel Schajris)	2012	—	16	—	—	—	—	—	—	—	—		Danna Paola
"Agüita"	2013	—	—	—	—	—	—	—	—	—	—		Danna Paola
"Mientras Me Enamoras" (with Lalo Brito)	2016	—	—	—	—	—	—	—	—	—	—		Non-album singles
"¿Dónde Estabas Tú?"	2017	—	—	—	—	—	—	—	—	—	—		Non-album singles
"So Good" (solo or remix with HRVY)	2018	—	—	—	—	—	—	—	—	—	—		Sie7e
"Final Feliz"	2018	—	—	—	—	—	—	—	—	—	—	AMPROFON: Gold	Sie7e
"Mala Fama" (solo or remix with Greeicy)	2019	—	16	—	—	—	—	— (Note: "Mala Fama" did not enter the Monitor Latino Nicaragua Airplay Top 20 chart, but peaked at number five on the Monitor Latino Nicaragua Pop Airplay Top 20 chart.)	—	—	—	AMPROFON: 4× Diamond+3× Platinum+Gold; RIAA: 2× Platinum (Latin); PROMUSICAE: Gold	Sie7e
"Oye Pablo"	2019	16	3	—	—	—	—	—	—	—	—	AMPROFON: 2× Diamond; RIAA: Platinum (Latin)	Sie7e +
"Subtítulos" (with Lasso)	2019	—	—	—	—	—	—	—	—	—	—	AMPROFON: Platinum+Gold	Cuatro Estaciones: Primavera
"Know Me Too Well" (with New Hope Club)	2019	—	—	—	—	—	—	—	—	—	—		New Hope Club
"Polo a Tierra" (with Skinny Happy and Yera featuring Trapical)	2019	—	—	—	—	—	—	—	—	—	—		Sie7e +
"Sodio"	2020	8	1	—	—	—	—	—	—	—	—	AMPROFON: 3× Platinum+Gold	Sie7e +
"Contigo"	2020	—	—	—	—	—	—	—	—	—	—		K.O.
"Sola"	2020	—	—	—	—	—	—	—	—	—	—		K.O.
"TQ Y YA"	2020	—	—	—	—	—	—	—	—	—	—		K.O.
"No Bailes Sola" (with Sebastián Yatra)	2020	9	2	23	14	2	12	10	8	—	— (Note: "No Bailes Sola" did not enter the Billboard Latin Pop Songs chart, but peaked at number 23 on the Billboard Latin Digital Song Sales chart.)	AMPROFON: Platinum; RIAA: Platinum(Latin); PROMUSICAE: Gold	K.O.
"Nada" (Note: A remix version of "Nada" with Cali y El Dandee and Guaynaa featuring Brytiago and Akon was released in December 2020.) (with Cali y El Dandee)	2020	—	—	37	99	—	17	— (Note: "Nada" did not enter the Monitor Latino Nicaragua Airplay Top 20 chart, but peaked at number five on the Monitor Latino Nicaragua Pop Airplay Top 20 chart.)	— (Note: "Nada" did not enter the Monitor Latino Panama Airplay Top 20 chart, but peaked at number eight on the Monitor Latino Panama Pop Airplay Top 20 chart.)	—	—	AMPROFON: 3× Platinum; RIAA: 4× Platinum (Latin); PROMUSICAE: Gold	Malibu
"Santería" (with Lola Índigo and Denise Rosenthal)	2020	—	—	—	—	9	—	—	—	15	—	PROMUSICAE: Platinum	Akelarre (Edición Especial)
"Me, Myself" (with Mika)	2020	—	—	—	—	—	—	—	—	—	—		K.O.
"Don't Go" (with Isabela Merced)	2020	—	—	—	—	—	—	—	—	—	15		Non-album single
"Friend de Semana" (with Luísa Sonza and Aitana)	2020	10	2	—	—	— (Note: "Friend de Semana" did not enter the Monitor Latino Costa Rica Airplay Top 20 chart, but peaked at number 19 on the Monitor Latino Costa Rica Latin Airplay Top 20 chart.)	—	—	12	—	—		K.O.
"Calla Tú"	2021	7	1	—	—	17	— (Note: "Calla Tú" did not enter the Monitor Latino Ecuador Airplay Top 20 chart, but peaked at number seven on the Monitor Latino Ecuador Pop Airplay Top 20 chart.)	—	— (Note: "Calla Tú" did not enter the Monitor Latino Panama Airplay Top 20 chart, but peaked at number five on the Monitor Latino Panama Pop Airplay Top 20 chart.)	—	—		K.O.
"Amor Ordinario"	2021	—	—	—	—	—	—	—	—	—	—		K.O.
"Vuelve, Vuelve" (with David Bisbal)	2021	33	7	71	—	—	16	—	— (Note: "Vuelve, Vuelve" did not enter the Monitor Latino Panama Airplay Top 20 chart, but peaked at number five on the Monitor Latino Panama Pop Airplay Top 20 chart.)	77	—	PROMUSICAE: Platinum	20 Años Contigo
"Ladrones" (with Lasso)	2021	—	—	—	—	—	—	—	—	—	—		Cuatro Estaciones: Invierno
"Idiota" (with Morat)	2021	6	3	—	88	—	—	—	—	72	—	AMPROFON: Gold; PROMUSICAE: Platinum	¿A Dónde Vamos?
"Mía"	2021	17	4	—	—	—	—	—	—	—	—		Non-album singles
"Kaprichosa"	2021	—	—	—	—	—	—	—	—	—	—		Non-album singles
"Si Tú Vuelas (Hadal Ahbek)" (Alok Remix) (with Issam Alnajjar and Alok)	2021	—	—	—	—	—	—	—	—	—	—		Baree?
"A Un Beso"	2021	—	—	—	—	—	—	—	—	—	—		Non-album single
"Rescue Me" (with Alesso)	2021	—	—	—	—	—	—	—	—	—	—		Blade Runner: Black Lotus
"Cachito" (with Mau y Ricky)	2021	—	—	—	—	—	—	—	—	—	—		Non-album single
"Sólo Quédate En Silencio" (with Moderatto)	2022	—	—	—	—	—	—	—	—	—	—		Rockea Bien Duro
"XT4S1S"	2022	16	—	—	—	—	—	—	—	—	24	AMPROFON: Diamond+2× Platinum+Gold	Childstar
"A Kind of Magic" (Coke Studio Mix for the FIFA World Cup 2022) (with Felukah and Tamtam)	2022	—	—	—	—	—	—	—	—	—	—		Non-album singles
"Mexico" (with Dimitri Vegas & Like Mike and Ne-Yo)	2023	—	—	—	—	—	—	—	—	—	—		Non-album singles
"1 Trago"	2023	—	—	—	—	—	—	—	—	—	—	AMPROFON: Platinum	Childstar
"TQUM" (with Sofía Reyes or remix with Kim Petras)	2023	—	—	—	—	—	—	—	—	—	—		Milamores
"Sugar Mami" (with Denise Rosenthal)	2023	—	—	—	—	—	—	—	—	—	—		Supernova
"Tenemos Que Hablar" (solo or with Jão)	2023	—	—	—	—	—	—	—	—	—	—	AMPROFON: Gold	Childstar
"Paranoia" (with Steve Aoki)	2023	—	—	—	—	—	—	—	—	—	—		Hiroquest 2: Double Helix
"AQYNE" (with Aitana)	2023	— (Note: "AQYNE" did not enter the Mexico Songs chart, but peaked at number five on the Monitor Latino Mexico Top 20 Pop airplay chart.)	—	—	—	—	—	—	—	33	—	PROMUSICAE: Platinum	Alpha
"Aún Te Quiero"	2023	—	—	—	—	—	—	—	—	—	—	AMPROFON: Gold	Childstar
"Atari"	2024	—	—	—	—	—	—	—	—	—	—		Childstar
"Platonik"	2024	—	—	—	—	—	—	—	—	—	—		Childstar
"El Doble" (with Abraham Mateo)	2024	—	—	—	—	—	—	—	—	—	—		Non-album singles
"Nada es para siempre" (with Santa Fe Klan)	2025	–	–	–	–	–	–	–	–	–	–		Non-album singles
"Khe Calor"	2025	–	–	–	–	–	–	–	–	–	–		Wet Dreams
"Lucid"	2026	–	–	–	–	–	–	–	–	–	–		Lucid Dreams
"Si se acaba el mundo) (with El Malilla)	2026	–	–	–	–	–	–	–	–	–	–		Wet Dreams
"Dolce Vita" (with Belinda)	2026	–	–	–	–	–	–	–	–	–	–		Wet Dreams
"—" denotes a single that did not chart or was not released.

=== As featured artist ===
List of singles as a featured artist, showing year released and album name
Title	Year	Album
"Crushin (Muero por Ti)" (Luis Lauro featuring Danna Paola)	2011	Amanecer
"Baila Hasta Caer" (AtellaGali featuring Danna Paola)	2016	Non-album single

=== Promotional singles ===
List of singles promotional singles
Title	Year	Album
"Cero Gravedad"	2011	Danna Paola
"Lo Que No Sabes"	2018	Sie7e
"Siento Amor"	2019	Sie7e +
"Viaje a La Luz"	2020	Más Allá de La Luna
"All I Want for Christmas Is You"	2020	Feliz Christmas (Vol.1)
"Dulce Navidad" (with Morat)	2020	Eterna Navidad Celebremos
"Ven a Cantar" (with Edith Márquez and Gloria Trevi featuring Kalimba, Kurt, La Adictiva Banda San José de Mesillas, Paty Cantú, Nicole Favre and Esteman)	2020	Eterna Navidad Celebremos
"It Must Have Been Love" (From I Love Beirut) (with Mika)	2021	Non-album promotional single
"Hasta Vencer"	2021	Raya y El Último Dragón
"Last Christmas"	2021	Non-album promotional singles
"Idiota (Real Magic)" (with Jão)	2023	Non-album promotional singles

== Guest appearances ==
List of non-single guest appearances, with other performing artists, showing year released and album name
Title	Year	Other artist(s)	Album
"Mensajero de Paz"	2003	—N/a	Mensajero de Paz
"Lama La"	2003	—N/a	Regina: Un Musical Para Una Nación Que Despierta
"Viva Regina"	2003	—N/a	Regina: Un Musical Para Una Nación Que Despierta
"Mañana"	2006	—N/a	Anita la Huerfanita
"Puros Palos Dan"	2006	—N/a	Anita la Huerfanita
"Siempre"	2006	—N/a	Anita la Huerfanita
"Nueva York"	2006	Ana Layevska and Manuel Landeta	Anita la Huerfanita
"Feliz Navidad y Año Nuevo"	2006	—N/a	Anita la Huerfanita
"Que Falte Todo Menos Tú"	2006	Manuel Landeta	Anita la Huerfanita
"Me Gusta Estar Aquí"	2006	—N/a	Anita la Huerfanita
"Vivan los Niños"	2010	—N/a	Non-album song
"Cuándo Empezaré a Vivir"	2010	—N/a	Enredados
"Mi Vida Empieza Así"	2010	—N/a	Enredados
"Mi Sueño Ideal"	2010	Chayanne, Alberto Castillo and Sebastian Llapur	Enredados
"Veo En Ti La Luz"	2010	Chayanne	Enredados
"It's Impossible / Somos Novios"	2012	Charlie Green	Rainbow
"Take a Chance on Me"	2014	—N/a	Dancing Queens - Un Tributo Para ABBA
"Everything"	2019	Joey Montana and Nasri	La Movida
"De Mí Enamórate"	2022	Juan Gabriel	Los Dúo, Vol. 3
"Paranoia (Fixed withGlue Remix)"	2024	Steve Aoki	Hiroquest 2: Double Helix Remixed
"Paranoia (Steve Aoki & Stephen Hurtley Remix)"	2024	Steve Aoki	Hiroquest 2: Double Helix Remixed
