= Yo quiero bailar =

Yo quiero bailar (Spanish, 'I want to dance') may refer to:

- Yo quiero bailar (album), by Sonia & Selena, 2001
  - "Yo quiero bailar" (song), 2001
- Yo Queiro Bailar, a 2004 album by Tadros
- Yo queiro bailar, a 2006 album by Los Sultanes

== See also ==
- "Yo También Quiero Bailar", a 1982 single by Gloria Estefan
- Quiero Bailar, a Spanish TV dance talent show
- "Quiero Bailar" (song), by Ivy Queen, 2003
