= Top Star. ¿Cuánto vale tu voz? =

- Genre: Reality competition
- Directed by: Carlos Pardeiro
- Presented by: Jesús Vázquez
- Judges: Danna Paola; Isabel Pantoja; Risto Mejide
- Country of origin: Spain
- Original language: Spanish
- No. of seasons: 1
- No. of episodes: 8

Production
- Executive producers: Mario Briongos; Nathalie García; Francesco Boserman; Néstor Barreira
- Running time: 105 minutes
- Production companies: Fremantle; Mediaset España

Original release
- Network: Telecinco
- Release: 7 May – 3 July 2021

Top Star. ¿Cuánto vale tu voz? ("Top Star. How much is your voice worth?") is a Spanish singing reality competition series created and produced jointly by Fremantle and Mediaset España. It premiered on Mediaset's flagship channel Telecinco on May 7, 2021.

Due to poor ratings, the show was pulled from its original Friday night time slot after two episodes, and later rescheduled for Saturdays starting May 29.

== Premise ==
Each episode features performances by a total of nine contestants split into three categories. For each category, the mentors have €30,000 to bid for the contestants during or after their performances. If none of the mentors places a bid for them, the contestant is immediately eliminated. Otherwise, the highest bidder backs the contestant, who then will face the scrutiny of "The 50", the members of the studio audience. The contestant who receives the most favorable votes from "The 50" advances to the final round later in the night, where "The 50" vote again to determine the weekly winner who will advance to the finale and win the money their backer bid for them.

== Host and mentors ==
The show is hosted in its first season by Jesús Vázquez, with Danna Paola, Isabel Pantoja and Risto Mejide serving as the mentors who bid for the contestants.

Cast timeline
Cast	Seasons
Cast	1
Host
Jesús Vázquez	Main
Mentors
Danna Paola	Main
Isabel Pantoja	Main
Risto Mejide	Main

== Season 1 (2021) ==
The contestant advanced to the Final Round after being backed by a mentor and receiving favorable votes from "The 50"
The contestant failed to advance to the Final Round
Danna Paola became the contestant's backer after placing the highest bid
Risto Mejide became the contestant's backer after placing the highest bid
Isabel Pantoja became the contestant's backer after placing the highest bid
The contestant was eliminated after none of the mentors placed a bid
The contestant won the Final Round and qualified for the finale
The contestant did not win the Final Round

=== Week 1 (May 7) ===
Order	Contestant	Song	Bids			Result
Order	Contestant	Song	Danna	Risto	Isabel	Result
Category: "My Big Night"
1	Javián	"Highway to Hell"	€11,000	€5,000	€16,000	
2	Carmen Elena	"Cómo mirarte"	€23,000	€18,000	€0	
3	Brequette Cassie	"River Deep – Mountain High"	€1,000	€16,000	€11,000	
Category: "Mom, I Want to Be an Artist"
4	Claudia Ula	"Secrets"	€7,000	€1,000	€4,000	
5	Mar Valdés	"Lágrimas negras"	€0	€0	€0	
6	Mikel Herzog Jr.	"Leave the Door Open"	€20,000	€28,000	€29,000	
Category: "Latin Heart"
7	Louis Mell	"'O sole mio" / "Quimbara"	€4,000	€0	€1,000	
8	Bamboe	"Historia de un Amor"	€0	€0	€0	
9	Daira Monzón	"Puro veneno"	€10,000	€30,000	€25,000	
Final Round
1	Mikel Herzog Jr.	"The Show Must Go On"	—N/a			RUNNER-UP
2	Brequette Cassie	"(You Make Me Feel Like) A Natural Woman"	—N/a			WINNER
3	Louis Mell	"Pégate"	—N/a			THIRD

=== Week 2 (May 14) ===
Order	Contestant	Song	Bids			Result
Order	Contestant	Song	Danna	Risto	Isabel	Result
Category: "We Are the Champions"
1	Rafa Blas	"Quédate conmigo"	€8,000	€5,000	€11,000	
2	Joana Jiménez	"Qué no daría yo"	€24,000	€25,000	€18,000	
3	Jadel	"Vivir lo nuestro"	€15,000	€0	€10,000	
Category: "My Way"
4	María Jesús López	"Vas a quedarte"	€8,000	€0	€13,000	
5	Laura G. Ballbé	"Versace on the Floor"	€17,000	€11,000	€14,000	
6	Marcelino Damion	"Closer"	€5,000	€15,000	€10,000	
Category: "Walking Tall"
7	Andriu	"Otro Trago"	€0	€0	€5,000	
8	Jxta Martín	"Tattoo"	€9,000	€11,000	€10,000	
9	Genis Whylan	"No Good"	€24,000	€19,000	€11,000	
Final Round
1	Joana Jiménez	"María de la O"	—N/a			WINNER
2	Marcelino Damion	"Without You"	—N/a			RUNNER-UP
3	Genis Whylan	"Folsom Prison Blues"	—N/a			THIRD

=== Week 3 (May 29) ===
Order	Contestant	Song	Bids			Result
Order	Contestant	Song	Danna	Risto	Isabel	Result
Category: "My Homeland"
1	Anton	"Just the Two of Us"	€27,000	€30,000	€29,000	
2	Aisha Bordas	"And I Am Telling You I'm Not Going"	€8,000	€0	€11,000	
3	Belinda Falcón	"Nana triste"	€22,000	€0	€17,000	
Category: "Teach Me How to Sing"
4	Sahra Lee	"Always Remember Us This Way"	€5,000	€0	€4,000	
5	Encarni Salazar	"Como el agua"	€13,000	€12,000	€18,000	
6	Alyre	"Stop!"	€7,000	€11,000	€10,000	
Category: "I Live for It"
7	Álex Escribano	"Inevitable"	€10,000	€12,000	€13,000	
8	Mónika Moreno	"Oops!... I Did It Again"	€0	€0	€1,000	
9	Isaac Cruz	"Es mi madre"	€17,000	€16,000	€15,000	
Final Round
1	Aisha Bordas	"Oh! Darling"	—N/a			THIRD
2	Sahra Lee	"Bésame Mucho"	—N/a			RUNNER-UP
3	Álex Escribano	"The Edge of Glory"	—N/a			WINNER

=== Week 4 (June 5) ===
Order	Contestant	Song	Bids			Result
Order	Contestant	Song	Danna	Risto	Isabel	Result
Category: "I Live Singing"
1	Antón Cortés	"Agustito"	€3,000	€14,000	€19,000	
2	Andrea Paracuto	"Oye"	€25,000	€20,000	€0	
3	Aída Blanco	"Domino"	€2,000	€15,000	€10,000	
Category: "Spectacular"
4	Chipper	"Don't Leave Me This Way"	€8,000	€13,000	€1,000	
5	Tete Pineda	"Corazón hambriento"	€0	€7,000	€8,000	
6	Big Mama Rachel	"Dirty"	€5,000*	€0	€5,000	
Category: "I Am a Rebel"
7	Ana Corbel	"Y sin embargo, te quiero"	€4,000	€0	€3,000	
8	Fran Coem	"La curiosidad"	€0	€0	€0	
9	Geniris	"Read All About It, Pt. III"	€18,000	€26,000	€29,000	
Final Round
1	Andrea Paracuto	"Hurt"	—N/a			WINNER
2	Tete Pineda	"S.O.S."	—N/a			THIRD
3	Geniris	"What's Love Got to Do with It"	—N/a			RUNNER-UP

(*) Won because of being the first bidder during the performance.

=== Week 5 (June 12) ===
Order	Contestant	Song	Bids			Result
Order	Contestant	Song	Danna	Risto	Isabel	Result
Category: "Girls Are Warriors"
1	Alba Gil	"What About Us"	€3,000	€0	€0	
2	Celia	"Pop"	€0	€0	€0	
3	Shakira Martínez	"Hoy Tengo Ganas de Ti"	€27,000	€20,000	€30,000	
Category: "I Am That One"
4	Sam Darris	"My Way"	€0	€28,000	€29,000	
5	Laura Gallego	"Se nos rompió el amor"	€27,000	€24,000	€0	
6	Jose de la Vega	"Vivir así es morir de amor"	€3,000	€3,000*	€0	
Category: "There Is Nobody Like You"
7	Mireia Decler	"Un día más de sol (Another Day of Sun)"	€0	€0	€0	
8	Luciano Bassi	"Human"	€10,000	€30,000	€25,000	
9	Alba Ed-Dounia	"Santería"	€7,000	€0	€4,000	
Final Round
1	Shakira Martínez	"Aún no te has ido"	—N/a			THIRD
2	Laura Gallego	"Sobreviviré"	—N/a			RUNNER-UP
3	Luciano Bassi	"Nessun dorma"	—N/a			WINNER

(*) Won because of being the first bidder during the performance.

=== Week 6 (June 19) ===
Order	Contestant	Song	Bids			Result
Order	Contestant	Song	Danna	Risto	Isabel	Result
Category: "Free"
1	Raquel Lamb	"Heart Attack"	€17,000	€8,000	€16,000	
2	Carmen Montoya	"Mía"	€5,000	€29,000	€26,000	
3	Ginés Garez	"Creep"	€6,000	€0	€11,000	
Category: "Off I Fly"
4	Manu Valiana	"Night and Day"	€0	€0	€1,000	
5	Mimi Barber	"I Want You Back"	€5,000	€1,000	€2,000	
6	Angélica Leyva	"No me importa nada"	€0	€13,000	€18,000	
Category: "Stay with Me"
7	Sharon Woods	"Feeling Good"	€10,000	€15,000	€16,000	
8	Anthony	"It's a Man's Man's Man's World"	€1,000	€0	€0	
9	Mila Balsera	"Señora"	€14,000	€12,000	€13,000	
Final Round
1	Carmen Montoya	"Por siempre tú (I Turn to You)"	—N/a			RUNNER-UP
2	Angélica Leyva	"Me quedo contigo"	—N/a			WINNER
3	Mila Balsera	"Amante de abril y mayo"	—N/a			THIRD

=== Week 7 (June 26) ===
Order	Contestant	Song	Bids			Result
Order	Contestant	Song	Danna	Risto	Isabel	Result
Category: "Everyone Looks at Me"
1	Selena Leo	"Yo quiero bailar"	€1,000	€0	€0	
2	Nalaya	"Shallow"	€29,000	€27,000	€30,000	
3	Milos	"Dangerous Woman"	€17,000	€22,000	€0	
Category: "Don't Stop Dreaming"
4	Lucía Cano	"Titanium"	€29,000	€28,000	€30,000	
5	Sislena Caparrosa	"Nella Fantasia"	€23,000	€24,000	€0	
6	Ignacio Serrano	"No quisiste verlo" (original song)	€10,000	€5,000	€0	
Category: "Money"
7	Antonia Cortés	"Hoy quiero confesarme"	€2,000	€0	€3,000	
8	Gio Bermejo	"Die like a Rockstar" (original song)	€2,000	€0	€1,000	
9	Verónica Rojas	"Aléjate de mí"	€3,000	€0	€0	
Final Round
1	Verónica Rojas	"Burbujas de amor"	—N/a			THIRD
2	Sislena Caparrosa	"Vesti la giubba"	—N/a			WINNER
3	Nalaya	"Ain't Nobody"	—N/a			RUNNER-UP

=== Finale (July 3) ===
For the first round of the finale, the mentors would have to pick one contestant and bid all their money for them once all seven contestants had performed. Each of them had €5,000 for each time one of their backed contestants had won during the season. Each of the finalists would compete for that amount plus an additional €10,000.

Order	Contestant	Song	Bids			Result
Order	Contestant	Song	Danna	Risto	Isabel	Result
First Round
1	Luciano Bassi	"Way Down We Go"				
2	Andrea Paracuto	"Sola otra vez (All by Myself)"	€5,000			
3	Joana Jiménez	"Punto de partida"				
4	Sislena Caparrosa	"O mio babbino caro"		€20,000		
5	Angélica Leyva	"Vida loca"				
6	Álex Escribano	"Hopelessly Devoted to You"				
7	Brequette Cassie	"Hallelujah"			€10,000	
Final Round
1	Sislena Caparrosa	"Caruso"	—N/a			THIRD
2	Brequette Cassie	"Proud Mary"	—N/a			WINNER
3	Andrea Paracuto	"I Will Always Love You"	—N/a			RUNNER-UP

=== Ratings ===
Top Star. ¿Cuánto vale tu voz? consolidated viewership and adjusted position Colour key: – Highest rating during the season (nominal) – Lowest rating during the season (nominal)
Episode	Original airdate	Timeslot	Viewers (millions)	Share	Night Rank	Source
1	7 May 2021	Friday 10 pm	1.51	11.3%	#2	
2	14 May 2021	Friday 10 pm	1.13	9.4%	#2	
3	29 May 2021	Saturday 10 pm	1.06	8.6%	#2	
4	5 June 2021	Saturday 10 pm	0.99	8.2%	#4	
5	12 June 2021	Saturday 12 am	0.35	5.6%	#5	
6	19 June 2021	Saturday 12 am	0.39	7.3%	#2	
7	26 June 2021	Saturday 11 pm	0.63	8.9%	#3	
8	3 July 2021	Saturday 11 pm	0.77	8.3%	#3	
