= Mundo de caramelo =

Single by Danna Paola

from the EP Danna Paola
- Released: February 10, 2008; March 8, 2009 (version Atrévete a soñar)
- Recorded: 2007
- Genre: teen pop
- Length: 3:53
- Label: Universal Music
- Songwriters: Carlos Law; Pedro Dabdoub

Danna Paola singles chronology
"Es mejor" (2007)	"Mundo de caramelo" (2008)	"Dame corazón" (2008)

"Mundo de Caramelo" (Candy World) is a song by Mexican actress and singer, Danna Paola. It was first released as the second single from her self-titled EP in September, 2007. In its relaunch, in 2009, it was used as the central theme of the telenovela, Atrévete a Soñar, which Paola protagonized. It also appeared on the soundtrack of the telenovela.

== Official versions ==
- "Mundo de caramelo" (Original version)
- "Mundo de caramelo" (Atrévete a soñar version)
- "Mundo de caramelo" (Acoustic version)
- "Mundo de caramelo" (Christmas version)
- "Mundo de caramelo" (Rock version)

== Awards ==
Year	Award	Category	Nominee	Result	Ref.
2009	Premios Oye!	Best telenovela, movie or TV series musical theme	"Mundo de caramelo"	Won	
2010	TVyNovelas Awards	Best Musical Theme	"Mundo de caramelo"	Won	
