= 11 Razones =

Studio album by Aitana
- Released: 11 December 2020
- Recorded: 2019–2020
- Genre: Pop rock; garage pop
- Length: 34:07
- Language: Spanish
- Label: Universal Music
- Producer: Andrés Torres; Mauricio Rengifo

Aitana chronology
| Spoiler (2019) | 11 Razones (2020) | Alpha (2023) |

Singles from 11 Razones
- 1. "+ (Más)" Released: 18 December 2019; 2. "Corazón Sin Vida" Released: 2 October 2020; 3. "11 Razones" Released: 7 December 2020

11 Razones (English: 11 Reasons; stylized in all caps) is the second studio album by Spanish singer Aitana, released on 11 December 2020 through Universal Music. Aitana enlisted usual producers Andrés Torres and Mauricio Rengifo to create a concept album about the reasons she had to leave a fictional male partner. The album features guest vocals from Sebastián Yatra, Cali y El Dandee, Beret, Natalia Lacunza, Álvaro Díaz and Pole, and is presented as a musical shift of Aitana into early the millennium's pop rock.

The album spawned three singles; "+ (Más)" was released on 18 December 2019 as the album's lead single, attaining both critical and commercial success. The song peaked at number two in Spain while also entering the charts in Ecuador and Paraguay. "Corazón Sin Vida" and the homonymous track were released as the second and third singles, respectively, both reaching the top ten in Spain and entering multiple charts in Latin America. Aitana embarked on the 11 Razones Tour, which commenced in July 2021 and traveled Europe and Latin America until late 2022.

== Background ==
Aitana began working on her second studio album in the summer of 2019 while embarking on her Play Tour. She also visited Los Angeles a couple times before and after to work with her habitual collaborators Andrés Torres and Mauricio Rengifo, who eventually won the Latin Grammy Award for Producer of the Year at the 2020 gala. The singer moved to the American city for a whole month in January 2020. Before that, she kicked off a single droplet era that started with the release of "+", a collaboration with Colombian duo Cali Y El Dandee that latter happened to be the lead single of her upcoming album. Recording sessions for the album stopped in March 2020 when the Spanish population was forced into lockdown to prevent the spread of COVID-19 due to the pandemic. Aitana, who was in Ibiza with her boyfriend and his parents, worked on some songs remotely while in the island. In early August, Aitana entered the studio again to record the vocals for all the songs that were conceived during lockdown.

During that time, she released a couple more singles, all of them collaborations. In May, "Enemigos" featuring Mexican trio Reik was released on digital and streaming platforms. Two months later, Aitana released her second vocal collaboration with Colombian band Morat, "Más De Lo Que Aposté". She also hinted a collaboration with Piso 21 set for summer but was never released. Despite that, she still hinted a new album for "late 2020" and stated that those songs wouldn't be included on her upcoming record.

On 2 October, her long-awaited collaboration with Sebastián Yatra was released under the titled "Corazón Sin Vida". The track included a sample of Alejandro Sanz' signature song "Corazón Partío" and was promoted on many TV shows including La Voz. Aitana announced the title, tracklist and cover of her sophomore album through social media on November 11. On December 7, 2020, the title track was released as the third single alongside a music video directed by Jean LaFleur.

== Recording ==
Recording sessions for 11 Razones started in May 2019 in Madrid, shortly before the release of Aitana's debut record. In early June recording sessions took place in Los Angeles alongside Andrés Torres and Mauricio Rengifo. Aitana stated to Los40 that the album was conceived after the critical acclaim of her song "+", recalling that critics praised her nostalgic power pop sound. She also stated that she first thought out the concept of mathematical symbols and started ordering them as a potential tracklist. Parting from it, she started writing the songs, being the title track the last one to be written since it is a compilation epilogue of the whole thing. The album's recording stopped in March 2020 due to the outbreak of COVID-19 in Spain. However, Aitana wrote many songs while quarantining in Ibiza with her boyfriend. The album was finished in September.

== Critical reception ==
11 Razones received mixed reviews from music critics. Pablo Tocino from Jenesaispop gave the album a total score of four and a half stars out of ten and stated that: "ultimately the album can be a stumbling block, not because of its idea but because of its execution, but in a certain way it is a success, because it means betting on Aitana's musical personality, which was the main failure of Spoiler. And a bet that could be good, because she really defends herself wonderfully in this style, as demonstrated in 'Tu Foto del DNI' or even the high points of this album... but the problem in this case is more than the material she has". Contrarely, music portal Vinilo Negro stated that: "Aitana for many reasons, is the present and the future of Spanish pop, this is not very debatable today and 11 Razones is the proof."

== Commercial performance ==
The album debuted at number 2 on the PROMUSICAE chart. The album had the best streaming debut on Spotify Spain since the release of El Mal Querer by Rosalía in November 2018 in a 24-hour period. All tracks performed very well, debuting at the top fifty of the platform's list. Meanwhile, "Cuando Te Fuiste", in collaboration with Natalia Lacunza, became the best-selling Spanish female collaboration in 2020. With 5.5 million streams in a single week, 11 Razones became the most streamed album in a week of the whole year. Also, all tracks off the album entered the PROMUSICAE chart, becoming the first Spanish act to ever do so. On January 19, the album reached the number 1 spot on the Spanish Albums Chart.

== Track listing ==
All tracks are written by Aitana, Andrés Torres and Mauricio Rengifo and produced by the latter two, except where noted. The album was mixed by Tom Norris.

| No. | Title | Writer(s) | Length |
|---|---|---|---|
| 1. | "No Te Has Ido y Ya Te Extraño" | | 3:30 |
| 2. | "- (Menos)" (with Álvaro Díaz and Pole.) | Aitana Ocaña; Álvaro Díaz; Andrés López; Andrés Torres; Mauricio Rengifo | 3:08 |
| 3. | "Estupidez" (with Beret) | Ocaña; Torres; Francisco Javier Álvarez Beret; Rengifo | 2:33 |
| 4. | "× (Por)" | | 2:21 |
| 5. | "Corazón sin vida" (with Sebastián Yatra) | Ocaña; Torres; Rengifo; Sebastián Obando; Alejandro Sánchez | 3:02 |
| 6. | "÷ (Dividido)" | | 3:15 |
| 7. | "Cuando Te Fuiste" (with Natalia Lacunza) | | 2:47 |
| 8. | "+ (Más)" (with Cali y El Dandee) | Ocaña; Alejandro Rengifo; Torres; Rengifo | 3:39 |
| 9. | "Si No Vas a Volver" | | 2:35 |
| 10. | "= (Igual)" | | 3:44 |
| 11. | "11 Razones" | | 3:33 |
| Total length: | | | 34:07 |

Notes

- All tracks are stylized in all caps.
- "Corazón Sin Vida" contains a sample of "Corazón Partío" by Alejandro Sanz.
- In the physical album, at the end of the title track, there is a hidden song called "Adiós" with a duration of 1:40.

== Charts ==
=== Weekly charts ===
Weekly chart performance for 11 Razones
| Chart (2021) | Peak position |
|---|---|
| Spain (PROMUSICAE) | 1 |

=== Year-end charts ===
Year-end chart performance for 11 Razones
| Chart (2021) | Position |
|---|---|
| Spanish Albums (PROMUSICAE) | 6 |
| Chart (2022) | Position |
| Spanish Albums (PROMUSICAE) | 27 |
| Chart (2023) | Position |
| Spanish Albums (PROMUSICAE) | 81 |

== Certifications ==
| Region | Certification | Certified units/sales |
|---|---|---|
| Argentina (CAPIF) | Platinum | 20,000^{^} |
| Chile | Platinum | |
| Spain (PROMUSICAE) | 2× Platinum | 80,000^{‡} |
^{^} Shipments figures based on certification alone.^{‡} Sales+streaming figures based on certification alone.

== Release history ==
| Country | Date | Format | Label | Ref. |
|---|---|---|---|---|
| Various | December 11, 2020 | Digital download; streaming; CD | Universal Music | |
| Spain | December 11, 2020 | Box set | Universal Music | |
| Spain | March 26, 2021 | Vinyl | Universal Music | |
| Spain | June 12, 2021 | Record Store Day limited blue vinyl | Universal Music | |
