= Ruleta (Danna Paola song) =

Single by Danna Paola

from the album Danna Paola
- Released: February 28, 2012
- Recorded: 2011
- Genre: Teen pop, electropop
- Length: 3:10
- Label: Universal Music
- Songwriters: Paty Cantú; Angela Dávalos

Danna Paola singles chronology
| "Crushin (Muero Por Ti)" (2011) | "Ruleta" (2012) | "Todo Fue Un Show" (2012) |

Music video
- "Ruleta" on YouTube

"Ruleta" (Roulette) is a song by Mexican Mexican singer and actress, Danna Paola. It was released as the first single from her fourth self-titled album on February 28, 2012, through digital distribution. "Ruleta" is styled in the genre of teen pop, with electronic touches.

== Music video ==
The music video for the song was filmed in Guadalajara, Jalisco, at Selva Mágica amusement park, in January, 2012. Paola was accompanied by over 30 dancers at the video shoot. The video premiered on a Google+ hangout which Paola attended, on 14 March 2012, on her Vevo account, her personal account on YouTube, as on her official website.
