= Corazón sin vida =

2020 song by Aitana

"Corazón Sin Vida"

Single by Aitana and Sebastián Yatra

from the album 11 Razones
- Language: Spanish
- English title: "Lifeless Heart"
- Released: October 2, 2020
- Genre: Pop; pop rock
- Length: 3:02
- Label: Universal Music
- Songwriter(s): Aitana Ocaña; Andrés Torres; Mauricio Rengifo; Sebastián Obando; Alejandro Sánchez
- Producer(s): Torres; Rengifo

Aitana singles chronology
"Más De Lo Que Aposté" (2020)	"Corazón Sin Vida" (2020)	"Friend de Semana" (2020)

Sebastián Yatra singles chronology
"A Dónde Van" (2020)	"Corazón Sin Vida" (2020)	"Chica Ideal" (2020)

"Corazón Sin Vida" (transl. "Lifeless Heart"; stylized in all caps) is a song recorded by Spanish singer and songwriter Aitana in collaboration with Colombian pop singer Sebastián Yatra. Written by both performers alongside Andrés Torres and Mauricio Rengifo, the song was released on October 2, 2020, through Universal Music as the second single of Aitana's sophomore studio album 11 Razones released in December 2020. The track features a sample of Alejandro Sanz' 1997 signature single "Corazón Partío".

== Background ==
The song was conceived during a studio session with Andrés Torres and Mauricio Rengifo in Madrid in January 2020 while Yatra jumped on the song in May, shortly after hearing the solo demo. This marks a second collaboration between the two since a still unreleased track meant to be on Yatra's second studio album Fantasía (2019), was recorded in late 2018. During the summer of 2020, Aitana hinted a collaboration with a big Latin American singer for the second release of her upcoming album. On September 26, a trio collaboration featuring Aitana, Yatra and Alejandro Sanz was registered on ASCAP. Two days later, shortly after the Spanish singer scored a second Latin Grammy nomination for Best Pop Vocal Album, an initial teaser for "Corazón Sin Vida" was released on social media and YouTube. With a second teaser being released the day after, the cover art and release date were revealed.

== Music video ==
Due to international travel restrictions to prevent the spread of COVID-19, the music video had to be filmed remotely, with Aitana being in Madrid and Yatra being in Miami. It was directed by Pablo Hernández. It tells the story of a couple who break up but still can't get each other out of their mind.

== Charts ==
Chart (2020)	Peak position
Argentina (Argentina Hot 100)	74
Spain (PROMUSICAE)	4

== Certifications ==
Region	Certification	Certified units/sales
Ecuador	Gold	
Mexico (AMPROFON)	Gold	30,000^{‡}
Peru	Gold	
Spain (PROMUSICAE)	Platinum	40,000^{‡}
^{‡} Sales+streaming figures based on certification alone.

== Release history ==
Country	Date	Format	Label
Various	October 2, 2020	Digital download; streaming	Universal Music
Spain	October 11, 2020	Contemporary hit radio	Universal Music
