= Lo más sencillo es complicarlo todo =

- Directed by: Rene Bueno
- Written by: Rene Bueno
- Starring: Danna Paola; Alosian Vivancos; Marjorie de Sousa
- Release date: 26 January 2018 (Mexico)
- Country: Mexico
- Language: Spanish

Lo más sencillo es complicarlo todo (English: The Easiest Thing Is To Complicate Everything) is a 2018 Mexican romantic comedy film written and directed by Rene Bueno. The film stars Danna Paola, Alosian Vivancos, and Marjorie De Sousa.

== Plot ==
The story revolves around Renata (Danna Paola), who has lived in love with Leonardo (Alosian Vivancos), the best friend of her half brother several years older than her. Now that Renata is of age to have a relationship with him, the beautiful Susana (Marjorie de Sousa) appears in Leonardo's life to stand in her way. Determined to get the love of her eternal crush, Renata will have to develop a plan to separate the couple, complicating everything in this hilarious comedy.

== Cast ==
- Danna Paola as Renata
- Alosian Vivancos as Leonardo
- Marjorie de Sousa as Susana
- Daniela Wong as Valeria
- Fernando Sarfatti as Papa de Renata
- Danilo Carrera as Wedding boy
