= Friend de Semana =

2020 song by Danna Paola, Luísa Sonza and Aitana

Single by Danna Paola featuring Luísa Sonza and Aitana

from the album K.O.
- Language: Spanish
- Released: October 30, 2020
- Genre: Dance-pop; teen pop
- Length: 3:29
- Label: Universal Music
- Songwriter(s): Aitana Ocaña; Arthur Marqués; Danna Paola; Luísa Sonza; Mango; Nabález; Pedro Malaver Turbay
- Producer(s): Mango; Nabález

Danna Paola singles chronology
"Don't Go" (2020)	"Friend de Semana" (2020)	"Calla Tú" (2021)

Luísa Sonza singles chronology
"Quebrar Seu Coração" (2020)	"Friend de Semana" (2020)	"Câncer" (2020)

Aitana singles chronology
"Corazón Sin Vida" (2020)	"Friend de Semana" (2020)	"11 Razones" (2020)

"Friend de Semana" is a song recorded by Mexican singer and actress Danna Paola in collaboration with Brazilian singer Luísa Sonza and Spanish singer Aitana. Written by both performers alongside Arthur Marqués, Pedro Malaver, Mango and Nabález and produced by the latter two, the song was released on October 30, 2020 through Universal Music as a single off Paola's compilation extended play Friend de Semana, released on that same day. It was also featured in Paola's sixth studio album K.O. (2021)

== Background ==
On October 24, all three performers began teasing the collaboration on Twitter. The track was officially confirmed two days later.

== Music video ==
Due to international travel restrictions to prevent the spread of COVID-19, the music video had to be filmed remotedly, with all performers being at their home country. The music video revolves around a high school in which Paola is the principal, Sonza the physical education teacher and Aitana a physics professor.

== Charts ==
Chart (2020)	Peak position
Mexico Airplay (Billboard)	16

== Release history ==
Country	Date	Format	Label
Various	October 30, 2020	Digital download; streaming	Universal Music
