= 11 Razones (song) =

2020 song by Aitana

Single by Aitana

from the album 11 Razones
- Released: December 7, 2020
- Recorded: September 2020
- Genre: Pop punk
- Length: 3:33
- Label: Universal Music
- Songwriter(s): Aitana Ocaña; Andrés Torres; Mauricio Rengifo
- Producer(s): Torres; Rengifo

Aitana singles chronology
"Friend de Semana" (2020)	"11 Razones" (2020)	"Mándame Un Audio (Remix)" (2021)

"11 Razones" (Spanish for "11 Reasons") is a song by Spanish singer Aitana. The song was released on December 7, 2020 through Universal Music as the third single of Aitana's sophomore studio album of the same name, released four days later. It was written by Aitana, Mauricio Rengifo and Andrés Torres and produced by the latter two. The song peaked at 15 on the PROMUSICAE singles chart.

== Background ==
Aitana first announced the release of her second studio album through social media on November 11, revealing the album's tracklist, cover art and release date. Later, on December 4, she teased an upcoming music video. She officially revealed that the tease belonged to the music video filming of "11 Razones", directed by Jean LaFleur, the day after. Aitana later revealed to Los40 that "11 Razones" was the last song she wrote for the album since she began developing the project through the concept of math signs and then recorded the title track after quarantining in Ibiza as the epilogue of the album.

== Charts ==
Chart (2019)	Peak position
Spain (PROMUSICAE)	15

== Certifications ==
Region	Certification	Certified units/sales
Spain (PROMUSICAE)	Gold	20,000^{‡}
^{‡} Sales+streaming figures based on certification alone.

== Release history ==
Country	Date	Format	Label
Various	December 7, 2020	Digital download; streaming	Universal Music
Spain	January 10, 2021	Contemporary hit radio	Universal Music
