= La Granja (2004 TV series) =

La Granja is the local version of the reality show The Farm in Spain. Two seasons of the show were aired on Antena 3, in 2004 and 2005. The format would be brought back by rival channel Telecinco in 2011, under the title Acorralados, and once more by Telecinco in 2022 as Pesadilla en el paraíso.

== Season 1 (2004) ==
The first season aired on Antena 3 from September 2004. It began on September 8, 2004, and ended on November 23, 2004, after 77 days of living in the farm. The show was presented by Terelu Campos, at the central studio, and Jaime Bores from The Farm.

=== Contestants ===
Contestants	Origin	Profession / Known for being	Final position
Loreto Valverde	Barcelona	TV host and actress	Winner
Fran Murcia	Murcia	Ex-basketballer, Lara Dibildos ex-husband	Runner-up
Cristina Sánchez	Madrid	Bullfighter	Third Place
Arancha Bonete	Quart de Poblet	Miss Playboy TV International	10th Evicted
Olivia de Borbón	London	Aristocrat, model and businesswoman	9th Evicted
Miss Shangay Lily	Málaga	Drag queen and writer	8th Evicted
Jorge Juste	Madrid	Ana Obregón ex-boyfriend	Walked
Ernesto Calzadilla	Caracas	Míster Venezuela 1998	7th Evicted
Francisco Fernández Ochoa	Madrid	Alpine skiing olympic medalist	6th Evicted
Alonso Caparrós	Madrid	TV host	5th Evicted
Paquita Torres	Bailén	Miss Spain 1966	4th Evicted
Mari Cielo Pajares	Madrid	Actress, Andrés Pajares daughter	3rd Evicted
Lía Chapman	Dominican Republic	Actress	2nd Evicted
David Meca	Sabadell	Long-distance swimmer	1st Evicted

=== Nominations ===
	Round 1	Round 2	Round 3	Round 4	Round 5	Round 6	Round 7	Round 8	Round 9	Round 10	Finale	
Farm Leader (Immunity)	Cristina	Arancha	Fran	Ernesto	Shangay	Olivia	Loreto	Cristina	Fran	Fran	None	
Loreto	Arancha	Jorge	Mari Cielo	Paquita	-	Arancha	Jorge	Olivia	Olivia	Arancha	Winner (Day 77)	
Fran	David	Loreto	Mari Cielo; Alonso (tie-break)	Paquito	-	Paquito	Jorge	Shangay	Loreto	Loreto	Runner-up (Day 77)	
Cristina	Arancha	Ernesto	Mari Cielo	Jorge	-	Jorge	Jorge	Arancha; Arancha (tie-break)	Olivia	Arancha	Third Place (Day 77)	
Arancha	Fran	Loreto; Lía (tie-break)	Mari Cielo	Olivia	-	Paquito	Olivia	Shangay	Olivia	Loreto	Evicted (Day 70)	
Olivia	Paquita	Ernesto	Mari Cielo	Alonso	-	Arancha	Ernesto	Shangay	Loreto	Evicted (Day 63)		
Shangay	Mari Cielo	Jorge	Mari Cielo	Jorge	-	Arancha	Olivia	Fran	Evicted (Day 56)			
Jorge	Paquita	Lía	Paquita	Cristina	-	Paquito	Olivia	Walked (Day 49)				
Ernesto	David	Jorge	Mari Cielo	Loreto	-	Jorge	Jorge	Evicted (Day 49)				
Paquito	David	Paquita	Mari Cielo	Jorge	-	Arancha	Evicted (Day 42)					
Alonso	David	Lía	Shangay	Paquita	-	Evicted (Day 35)						
Paquita	Olivia	Jorge	Mari Cielo	Jorge	Evicted (Day 28)							
Mari Cielo	Arancha	Shangay	Alonso	Evicted (Day 21)								
Lía	Mari Cielo	Jorge	Evicted (Day 14)									
David	Ernesto	Evicted (Day 7)										
Nominated	David (4); Arancha (3)	Jorge (5); Lía (2)	Mari Cielo (9); Alonso (1)	Jorge (4); Paquita (2)	Alonso (?); Loreto (?)	Arancha (4); Paquito (3)	Jorge (4) -Walked- Olivia (3); Ernesto (1)	Shangai (3); Arancha (1)	Olivia (3); Loreto (2)	Arancha (2); Loreto (2)	None	
Evicted	David; 48.27% to save	Lía; 44% to save	Mari Cielo; 27% to save	Paquita; 43% to save	Alonso; 26% to save	Paquito; 32% to save	Ernesto; 37% to save	Shangay; 9% to save	Olivia; 35% to save	Arancha; 38% to save	Cristina; 22% to win (Out of 3)	Fran; 40% to win
Evicted	David; 48.27% to save	Lía; 44% to save	Mari Cielo; 27% to save	Paquita; 43% to save	Alonso; 26% to save	Paquito; 32% to save	Ernesto; 37% to save	Shangay; 9% to save	Olivia; 35% to save	Arancha; 38% to save	Loreto; 60% to win	

== Season 2 (2005) ==
The second season was shown from March 29, 2005, and ended on June 5, 2005, after 69 days of living in La Granja. This season was presented by Terelu Campos and Óscar Modegro.

=== Contestants ===
Contestants	Origin	Profession / Known for being	Final position
Miguel Ángel Redondo	Córdoba	Míster Córdoba 2003, Marlène Mourreau boyfriend	Winner
M.ª Jesús y su acordeón	Cáceres	Singer and accordionist	Runner-up
Dani DJ	France	Belén Esteban ex-boyfriend	Third Place
Arévalo	Madrid	Comedian	11th Evicted
Rappel	Madrid	Fortune teller	10th Evicted
Lucía	Seville	Singer	9th Evicted
María Jesús Ruiz	Andújar	Miss Spain 2004	8th Evicted
Alicia Machado	Maracay	Miss Universe 1996	7th Evicted
Erik Putzbach	Barcelona	Stylist	6th Evicted
Fernando Acaso	Madrid	TV host	5th Evicted
Jordi Gómez Llunas	Barcelona	Dyango son and singer	4th Evicted
Susana Estrada	Gijón	Vedette and actress	3rd Evicted
Selena Leo	Castellón	Former Sonia & Selena singer	2nd Evicted
Two Yupa	Thailand	Rappel ex-girlfriend	1st Evicted

=== Nominations ===
	Round 1	Round 2	Round 3	Round 4	Round 5	Round 6	Round 7	Round 8	Round 9	Round 10	Finale	
Farm Leader (Immunity)	Fernando	Arévalo	Rappel	Lucía	Erik	Miguel Ángel	M.ª Jesús R.	Dani	Miguel Ángel	None		
Miguel Ángel	-	-	-	-	-	-	-	-	-	Nominated	Winner (Day 69)	
M.ª Jesús G.	-	-	-	-	-	-	-	-	-	Nominated	Runner-up (Day 69)	
Dani	-	-	-	-	-	-	-	-	-	Nominated	Third Place (Day 69)	
Arévalo	-	-	-	-	-	-	-	-	-	Nominated	Evicted (Day 62)	
Rappel	Two Yupa	-	-	-	-	-	-	-	-	Nominated	Evicted (Day 62)	
Lucía	-	-	-	-	-	-	-	-	-	Evicted (Day 62)		
M.ª Jesús R.	Dani	Selena	-	-	-	-	-	-	Evicted (Day 55)			
Alicia	-	-	-	-	-	-	-	Evicted (Day 48)				
Erik	-	-	-	-	-	-	Evicted (Day 41)					
Fernando	Two Yupa; Two Yupa	-	-	-	-	Evicted (Day 34)						
Jordi	-	-	-	-	Evicted (Day 27)							
Susana	-	-	-	Evicted (Day 20)								
Selena	-	M.ª Jesus R.	Evicted (Day 15)									
Two Yupa	Rappel	Evicted (Day 8)										
Nominated	Dani (3); Two Yupa (3)	Alicia (?); Selena (?)	Arévalo (?); Susana (?)	Alicia (?); Jordi (?)	Fernando (?); M.ª Jesús G. (?)	Alicia (?); Erik (?)	Alicia (?); Arévalo (?)	M.ª Jesús G. (?); M.ª Jesús R. (?)	Lucía (?); M.ª Jesús G. (?)	Todos	None	
Evicted	Two Yupa; 41% to save	Selena; 39% to save	Susana; 38% to save	Jordi; 46% to save	Fernando; 44% to save	Erik; 42% to save	Alicia; 35% to save	M.ª Jesús R. 40% to save	Lucía; 21% to save	Rappel ?% to save	Dani; 20% to win (Out of 3)	M.ª Jesús G. 46% to win
Evicted	Two Yupa; 41% to save	Selena; 39% to save	Susana; 38% to save	Jordi; 46% to save	Fernando; 44% to save	Erik; 42% to save	Alicia; 35% to save	M.ª Jesús R. 40% to save	Lucía; 21% to save	Arévalo ?% to save	Miguel Ángel; 54% to win	
