= Loreto Valverde =

Spanish actress, singer and TV presenter

- Born: Loreto Valverde Martín; October 1, 1966 (age 59); Barcelona, Spain
- Occupations: Actress, singer, theatre producer and tv presenter
- Spouse(s): Alejandro Carracedo (1995–1996); Roberto Rodríguez (1999–present)
- Children: Judith Rodríguez Valverde; Ruth Rodríguez Valverde

Loreto Valverde Martín is a Spanish actress, singer and television presenter.

== Theater ==
Born into a family of artists, she is the daughter of singer Lorenzo Valverde and Ángeles Martín (who died on April 2, 2012), and sister of actress and singer Marta Valverde. She began her career in the entertainment industry at a young age, participating in shows such as Por la calle de Alcalá, Con la vida del otro, El chaleco blanco, and Amor a medias (2000), by Alan Ayckbourn.

In 2010, she began a tour of Spain with the play Desnudos en Central Park, directed by Jaime Azpilicueta and co-starring with Manuel Galiana.

In 2012, she appeared in the musical The Sound of Music a production by Drive Entertainment and Vertigo Tours, directed by Jaime Azpilicueta. In 2017, she was part of the cast of another musical, Menopause, the Musical, alongside her sister Marta.

== Film ==
She made her film debut in 1988 in the comedy by Mariano Ozores Ya no va más (No more bets), in which she starred with her own sister and Antonio Ozores. She would go on to appear in La chica de Tahití (1990), Superagentes en Mallorca (1990), Horror en el Museo de Cera (Wax Museum Horror) and La noche del ejecutor (The Night of the Executioner) (1992), directed by Paul Naschy, Vividor (2000), directed by Luis Alberto Serrano and made a cameo in ¡Ja me maaten...! (2000), directed by Juan Muñoz, while pregnant.

== Television ==
Her first contact with the world of television was in the sports program Estudio Estadio, on Televisión Española (TVE), in which she participated as a hostess for a few months in 1989.

She began appearing on Telecinco, the network on which she began collaborating as a regular guest on the program VIP Noche (1990), which was presented by Emilio Aragón and Belén Rueda.

In 1991, she joined journalist Javier Basilio to present the humor program Qué gente tan divertida (What fun people).

She then went on to host Goles son amores (Goals Are Love) (1992), with Manolo Escobar, Bellezas al agua (Beauties in the Water) (1993), with Agustín Bravo, and La batalla de las estrellas (1994), with Bertín Osborne.

In 1995, she was one of the main actresses in the series La revista for TVE, with nine appearances singing, dancing, and acting in this series. She starred in performances of, among others, the series La blanca doble.

After a hiatus, she returned to television in 1997, co-hosting the variety show Risas y Estrellas with José Luis Moreno and Paloma Lago for TVE until 1999. For six years she presented the International Habaneras and Polyphony Contest of Torrevieja, broadcast on TVE's second channel and on the international channel for all of Latin America. She returned to TVE with the program Humor se escribe con Hache, at the end of 2000 and the beginning of 2001.

During 2002 and 2003 she focused on a business project.

She returned to the screen in 2004, replacing Leticia Sabater on the program Mentiras Peligrosas on Canal 7, a version of the Peruvian show Laura en América by Laura Bozzo. In 2004 she participated in the reality show La Granja, on Antena 3, of which she became the winner of its first edition. She resumed her profession in 2007, returning to present the International Habaneras and Polyphony Contest of Torrevieja for Antena 3, on its Nova channel and Antena 3 international, she also did it in 2008 for Canal Nou. From 2008 to 2011 she participated as an actress in the Sketches series within the entertainment program Noche Sensacional for FORTA. In 2011 she appeared in the musical The Sound of Music.

== Music ==
She has also recorded two albums with her sister Marta: Caramelo and Ángelo. Both were finalists at the Benidorm Song Festival in 1993, with the song "Enamoradas del mismo sueño".

== Personal life ==
She has two daughters, Judith (2000) and Ruth (2006). In 2012, her mother died from a fatal blow to the head after falling down a staircase. In 2018, she publicly announced that she was diagnosed with breast cancer. In February 2021, her father Lorenzo Valverde died due to respiratory complications unrelated to COVID-19.
