= Sie7e + =

Studio album by Danna
- Released: February 7, 2020
- Genre: Latin pop
- Length: 38:59
- Label: Universal Music Mexico
- Producers: Agustin Zubillaga; Ali Stone; Andrés Saavedra; Andy Clay; Aureo Baqueiro; Bruno Valverde; Luis Jimenez; Saak; Stefano Vieni; YahYah Music; Yera

Danna chronology
Sie7e (2019)	Sie7e + (2020)	K.O. (2021)

Singles from Siete +
- 1. "Oye Pablo" Released: August 29, 2019; 2. "Polo a Tierra" Released: October 25, 2019; 3. "Sodio" Released: February 7, 2020

Sie7e + is the fifth studio album by Mexican singer Danna, released on February 7, 2020, by Universal Music Mexico. The album contains songs from Paola's previous EP, Sie7e (2019), including the smash-hits "Mala Fama" and "Final Feliz", alongside the new tracks "Oye Pablo", "Polo a Tierra" and "Sodio".

== Track listing ==
Sie7e + track listing
No.	Title	Writer(s)	Producer(s)	Length
1.	"Mala Fama"	Danna Rivera; Andrés Saavedra; Andy Clay; Yoel Henriquez	Andrés Saavedra; Andy Clay	3:02
2.	"Oye Pablo"	Rivera; Bruno Valverde; Dahiana Cholaquides; Hajar Sbiji	Bruno Valverde	2:57
3.	"Sodio"	Rivera; Stefano Vieni; Taylor Diaz	Just Roger; Stegano Vieni	3:06
4.	"Polo a Tierra" (with Skinny Happy and Yera featuring Trapical)	Rivera; Camilo Vasquez; Miguel Angel Ospino	Yera	3:24
5.	"Final Feliz"	Agustin Zubillaga; Cholaquides; Luis Jimenez; Pablo Dabdoub	Agustin Zubillaga; Luis Jimenez	3:04
6.	"Lo Que No Sabes"	Alejandra Alberti; Federico Vindver; María Cristina Chiluiza	Aureo Baqueiro	3:54
7.	"So Good"	Alberti; Trevor Muzzy	Saak	2:59
8.	"Valientes"	Rivera; Alicia Gómez; Ximena Muñoz	Ali Stone	3:14
9.	"Dos Extraños"	Rivera; Vieni; Daniel Sobrino	Vieni	3:33
10.	"Siento Amor"	Donna Summer; Giorgio Moroder; Pete Bellotte	YahYah Music	3:45
11.	"Mala Fama (Remix)" (with Greeicy)	Rivera; Saavedra; Clay; Henriquez; Greeicy Rendón	Saavedra; Clay	2:57
12.	"So Good (Remix)" (with HRVY)	Alberti; Muzzy	Saak	2:59
Total length:				38:59

== Charts ==
Chart performance for Sie7e+
Chart (2020)	Peak position
US Latin Pop Albums (Billboard)	16

== Certifications ==
Region	Certification	Certified units/sales
Mexico (AMPROFON)	Diamond+4× Platinum	540,000^{‡}
^{‡} Sales+streaming figures based on certification alone.
