= K.O. (album) =

Studio album by Danna
- Released: January 13, 2021
- Genre: Latin pop
- Length: 33:45
- Label: Universal Music Mexico

Danna chronology
Sie7e + (2020)	K.O. (2021)	Childstar (2024)

Singles from K.O.
- 1. "Contigo" Released: May 1, 2020; 2. "Sola" Released: May 28, 2020; 3. "TQ Y YA" Released: June 26, 2020; 4. "No Bailes Sola" Released: July 17, 2020; 5. "Me, Myself" Released: September 11, 2020; 6. "Friend de Semana" Released: October 30, 2020; 7. "Calla Tú" Released: January 14, 2021; 8. "Amor Ordinario" Released: February 12, 2021

K.O. is the sixth studio album by Mexican singer Danna, released on January 13, 2021, by Universal Music Mexico. The album has spawned eight singles: "Contigo", "Sola", "TQ Y YA", "No Bailes Sola" with Sebastián Yatra, "Me, Myself" with Mika, "Friend de Semana" with Luísa Sonza and Aitana, "Calla Tú" and "Amor Ordinario". K.O. received a nomination for a Latin Grammy Award for Best Pop Vocal Album.

== Background ==
As Paola told Billboard, work on K.O. began as early as 2018, even before she released her previous album Sie7e + (2020). The singer confessed that the first song she wrote for the album was "Friend de Semana" while she was still living in Madrid and shooting Elite. Paola described the album as "personal" and highlighted "Amor Ordinario" as the "most personal" of the album: "[the song] defines my emotional process and everyone that heard it felt my pain and what I went through from beginning to end. I wrote this song in January 2020 and I had to understand what ordinary love meant and that I deserved better".

=== Title ===
K.O. is the abbreviated form for "knockout", which is a fight-ending, winning criterion in several full-contact combat sports, such as boxing, kickboxing, muay thai, mixed martial arts, karate, some forms of taekwondo and other sports involving striking, as well as fighting-based video games. Paola explained the meaning of the title to Billboard: "With this album, I knocked out all of the bad stuff that was killing me, emotionally. I used it to drain everything I had in my heart. That's why I named it K.O. — because it was like the last punch to the heart during this whole process".

=== Release ===
On Monday, January 11, 2021, Paola posted a series of photos to Instagram with the caption "Welcome to my break-up party" and announced that she would finally be releasing her sixth studio album, K.O., on Thursday, January 14. However, on Wednesday, January 13, the entire album leaked online and the release was brought forward by a day.

Something really crazy happened; something I, as an artist and as a person, thought "Meh, those kind of things will never happen to me," but it did. I just know that the album leaked. I panicked and screamed, I could not believe what was happening. The [streaming] platforms, obviously in order to protect the content and for it to come out in high quality, released the album earlier; literally a day before.

— Paola on the album leak, Instagram Live.

== Track listing ==
K.O. track listing
No.	Title	Writer(s)	Producer(s)	Length
1.	"Friend de Semana" (with Luísa Sonza and Aitana)	Danna Rivera; Luísa Gerloff; Aitana Ocaña; Mango; Nabález; Arthur Marques; Pedro Malaver	Mango; Nabález	3:28
2.	"Contigo"	Rivera; Saak	Saak	2:40
3.	"No Bailes Sola" (with Sebastián Yatra)	Rivera; Sebastián Obando; Andrés Torres; Joel Figueroa; Mauricio Rengifo; Randi Me; Valeria Martínez	Sebastián Yatra; Andrés Guerrero; Andrés Munera; Toby; Saak	3:02
4.	"TQ Y YA"	Rivera; Figueroa; Luis Miguel Romero; Alejandra Zéguer; Jorge Mestiza	Luis Miguel Romero	2:52
5.	"Calla Tú"	Rivera; One Path; Raúl Gómez	Bruno Valverde	2:41
6.	"Sola"	Rivera; Figueroa; MacGregor Leo; Alejandra Alberti; Dani Blau	MacGregor Leo	3:05
7.	"Amor Ordinario"	Rivera; Stefano Vieni; Raquel Sofía	Stegano Vieni	3:10
8.	"Bajo Cero"	Rivera; Vieni; Valentina López	Vieni	3:34
9.	"Justified"	Rivera; Vieni; Kathryn Guerra; Ximena Muñoz	Vieni; Tido	3:07
10.	"Me, Myself" (with Mika)	Rivera; Michael Holbrook; Alberti; Blau; James Gutch	Tido	3:00
11.	"T.A.C.O."	Rivera; Alexander Palmer; Carola Rosas	Valverde; Alexander Palmer	3:00
Total length:				33:45

K.O. – Apple Music Edition
No.	Title	Length
12.	"Danna Paola Habla Sobre "Amor Ordinario"" (Video)	1:57
Total length:		35:42

== Charts ==
Chart performance for K.O.
Chart (2020)	Peak position
Spanish Albums (PROMUSICAE)	81
US Latin Pop Albums (Billboard)	9

== Certifications ==
Region	Certification	Certified units/sales
Mexico (AMPROFON)	Platinum	140,000^{‡}
^{‡} Sales+streaming figures based on certification alone.
