= Yo quiero bailar (album) =

Studio album by Sonia & Selena
- Released: November 23, 2001
- Recorded: 2001
- Genre: Dance-pop

Yo Quiero Bailar is a debut album of the Spanish singers Sonia & Selena. This album was a big success. It achieved gold and platinum certification in countries such as Spain, Latin America and Europe and sold over 1,000,000 copies there.

== Track listing ==
CD (Vale VLCD 091-1)

1. Yo quiero bailar
2. Deja que mueva, mueva, mueva
3. Que viva la noche
4. Cuando el sol se va
5. En tus manos mi destino
6. Mitad de la mitad
7. Mucho por vivir... en Gran Hermano
8. Tequila
9. DejarÉ
10. Mano a mano
11. No tengas miedo de amar
12. Yo quiero bailar (Extended version)
