= Tadros (duo) =

Canadian musical duo

- Also known as: Les jumeaux Tadros
- Origin: Montreal, Quebec, Canada
- Genres: Pop
- Years active: 2000–present
- Labels: Due Belier Records
- Members: Daniel "Dan" Tadros; Eric Tadros

Tadros also known as Les Frères Tadros / the Tadros Brothers / Les jumeaux Tadros / Duo Tadros are a Quebec-based Canadian musical duo consisting of singer-songwriters (identical twin brothers) Daniel "Dan" Tadros and Eric Tadros (born in Montreal in 1976). The Tadros brothers, of mixed Egyptian and Italian origin, are multilingual performers with songs composed in both French and English, and also singing in Spanish and Italian. They are the only artists signed to "Due Belier Disques" record label, which is the label they own.

== Career ==
Identical twin brothers Daniel and Eric Tadros studied Marketing at Montreal's Concordia University. Upon their graduation, they decided to follow a musical career. Their initial release was "Maze" (2000) followed by "Pure Pleasure" (2001) and "PornStar" (2003). Soon followed their debut studio album of the same title Yo Quiero Bailar that includes also an English and French version remix of the single hit from Sonia & Selena.

In 2007, Tadros released two albums, the all-English Pure Pleasure and the all-French album Vis ta vie. Four of the songs of the album were written in a specially constructed 4 feet by 4 feet incubator at Place des Arts where they stayed continuously for a full week in the area popularly known as "bulle" attracting big media attention.

Also famous are their "singing billboards" initiative in which they hired a number of billboard in strategic positions around Montreal, that would broadcast for a whole week 24 hours on 24 music by Tadros thus attracting passersby. They claim they are also planning to embark on Space Adventures trip to outer space where they want to perform a song dedicated to universal peace. In 2012, they released their English-language album Under My Skin and in 2013, a new single "Rebel" in both English featuring Julie Lévesque and French featuring additionally O.T MC (from Dubmatique).

In February 2016, they released their all-English language album Djembe on Due Belier Records where they are credited as Tadros Brothers.

== Discography ==
=== Albums ===
Title and details	Notes
Yo Quiero Bailar: Released: 2004	No. / Title / Length; 1. / "Yo quiero bailar" / 3:33; 2. / "Loin des yeaux" / 3:52; 3. / "Sta Sera" / 3:50; 4. / "Être aimé" / 3:53; 5. / "PornStar" / 3:05; 6. / "Living" / 3:17; 7. / "Labyrynthe" / 4:07; 8. / "Tant d'amour" / 3:15; 9. / "Yo Quiero Bailar (English)" / 3:36; 10. / "Yo Quiero Bailar (Français)" / 3:36; 11. / "Tou ce qu'on veut pour Noẽl (bonus track)" / 3:32
Pure Pleasure: Released: 2006	No. / Title / Length; 1. / "Pure Pleasure"; 2. / "Roller Coaster"; 3. / "Maze"; 4. / "Missing"; 5. / "My Girlfriend"; 6. / "Oh Oh Did You Know"; 7. / "More Than Words"; 8. / "Sta Sera"; 9. / "Please Please"; 10. / "Showbiz"
Vis ta vie: Released: 2007	No. / Title / Length; 1. / "Si on dansait"; 2. / "Femme"; 3. / "Vis ta vie"; 4. / "Le manège"; 5. / "Pour toi"; 6. / "Ton jeu"; 7. / "Tombé"; 8. / "Living"; 9. / "Je m'ennuie"; 10. / "Être aimé"; 11. / "Simplement"
Under My Skin: Released: 2012	No. / Title / Length; 1. / "Under My Skin" / 4:41; 2. / "Do You Remember" / 4:10; 3. / "Dancing Machine" / 3:24; 4. / "Thank You" / 4:33; 5. / "Something Magical" / 4:19; 6. / "Jewel of the Nile" / 5:56; 7. / "Hollywood Is for Superstars" / 3:55; 8. / "We Should Be Dancing" / 3:44; 9. / "From This Moment On" / 3:41; 10. / "Do You Feel" / 3:43; 11. / "Abc" / 4:40; 12. / "Tell Me" / 4:41; 13. / "Cathing the Fever" / 4:04; 14. / "Feel So Go So Right" / 3:56
Djembe: Released: 2016	No. / Title / Length; 1. / "Fighter" / 2:56; 2. / "Soldier" / 3:07; 3. / "Oh Oh World Cup" / 3:19; 4. / "Message" / 4:09; 5. / "Infatuated" / 3:33; 6. / "Play the Game" / 3:16; 7. / "Rebel" / 3:22; 8. / "Nirvana" / 2:45; 9. / "Maverik" / 3:12; 10. / "Pure Pleasure" / 3:27; 11. / "Burn" / 2:58; 12. / "Djembe" / 3:41; 13. / "Djembe (Spanish Version)" / 3:42; 14. / "We Are Free" / 2:58

=== EPs ===
Title and details	Notes
All We Want For Christmas Is Love / Tout ce qu'on veut pour Noẽl: Released: 2007	No. / Title / Length; 1. / "All We Want For Christmas Is Love"; 2. / "Tout ce qu`on veut pour Noẽl.. C'est de l`amour"; 3. / "La Sola Cosa Que Queremos Para Navidads Es Amor"; 4. / "All We Want For Christmas Is Love (Instrumental)"; 5. / "Tout ce qu`on veut pour Noẽl.. C'est de l`amour (Instrumental)"; 6. / "La Sola Cosa Que Queremos Para Navidads Es Amor (Instrumental)"
I'm Gonna Be Somebody: Released: 2007	No. / Title / Length; 1. / "I'm Gonna be somebody" / 2:52; 2. / "Let's bring back the 70's" / 3:35; 3. / "N.A.S.A" / 1:12; 4. / "Are You Happy?" / 3:01; 5. / "More Than Words" / 4:34
Pornstar: Released: 2012	No. / Title / Length; 1. / "Porn Star" / 3:09; 2. / "Porn Star (Dance Version)" / 4:05; 3. / "Porn Star (French Version)" / 3:09; 4. / "Porn Star (Soft Core)" / 3:13; 5. / "Porn Star (Naked Mix)" / 3:03; 6. / "Lust" / 3:11; 7. / "Dirty" / 3:57; 8. / "Sex (Rock)" / 2:39; 9. / "Sex (Faster)" / 2:39; 10. / "Pure Pleasure" / 3:58

=== Remixes ===
Title and details
EuroDance
- Released: 2010
Notes

No.	Title	Length
1.	"Dancing Machine (Remix)"	10:21
2.	"Do You Feel (Remix)"	6:34
3.	"Magikal (Remix)"	6:10
4.	"My Heart Goes (Remix)"	6:39
5.	"Remix Tell Me (Remix)"	4:47
6.	"Porn Star (Trance Dance Remix)"	4:04
7.	"Yo Quiero Bailar (House Remix)"	7:33
8.	"Rebel (Anthony Simon Radio Remix Edit)"	3:47
9.	"Rebel (Anthony Simon Remix Extended Version)"	4:12
10.	"Yo Quiero Bailar (Radio Remix)"	3:56
11.	"We Should Be Dancing (Remix)"	7:02

=== Singles / Videography ===
- 2000: "Maze"
- 2001: "Pure Pleasure"
- 2003: "PornStar"
- 2004: "Yo Quiero Bailar"
- 2005: "Être aimé"
- 2006: "Living"
- 2008: "Vis ta vie"
- 2013: "Play the Game (Go) / "La game (Go)" (French version)
- 2013: "Rebel" (feat. Julie L.) / (French version feat. O.T MC & Julie L.)
- 2016: "Oh Oh World Cup"
- 2016: 'C'es ainsi"
- 2016: "Djembe"
- 2016: "Message"
- 2019: "Cet été (Beachday Everyday)"
- 2020: "Ça va bien aller"
