= Atrévete a soñar =

- Also known as: Atrévete a soñar... La historia de Patito Feo
- Genre: Telenovela
- Based on: Patito Feo by Alejandro Stoessel
- Directed by: Rodrigo G. H. Zaunbos
- Starring: Vanessa Guzmán; Danna Paola; René Strickler; Cynthia Klitbo; Violeta Isfel; Eleazar Gómez; Julissa
- Opening theme: "Mundo de caramelo", performed by Danna Paola
- Country of origin: Mexico
- Original language: Spanish
- No. of episodes: 262

Production
- Executive producer: Luis de Llano Macedo
- Production locations: Mexico City, Mexico
- Running time: 43 min.
- Production companies: Televisa; Ideas del Sur

Original release
- Network: Canal de las Estrellas
- Release: 8 March 2009 – 7 March 2010

Related
- Patito Feo

Atrévete a soñar (transl. Dare to Dream) is a Mexican children's and teen comedy telenovela produced by Luis de Llano for Televisa, under license from Ideas del Sur. It premiered on El Canal de las Estrellas on 8 March 2009, becoming the first telenovela in Mexico to debut on a Sunday. Following its success, particularly among younger audiences, the series concluded on 7 March 2010, also a Sunday.

The telenovela is an adaptation of the Argentine Patito Feo (2007–08). It stars Danna Paola as Patito and Eleazar Gómez as Mateo, with Violeta Isfel and Cynthia Klitbo portraying the antagonists Antonella and Bianca. It also features adult protagonists René Strickler and Vanessa Guzmán.

== Plot ==
Ana takes charge of the cafeteria at the neighborhood high school called el(the) CAMP and lives in the same establishment in which el(the) CAMP is located. There Patito comes to study and soon meets a group of new friends. She also makes enemies with a group of other girls. Her entrance to the high school brings before her a yet unknown reality: that of prejudices, qualms, and discrimination. To the leaders of the high school, headed by the frivolous Antonella, daughter of Bianca, Patito is an ugly duckling, and direct at her all their mockery and tricks. Here she meets her prince, Mateo.

Patito becomes the leader of Las Populares (The Populars), sensible young ladies who do not want to be "bimbos" like Las Divinas (The Divines) who only care about power and appearances. The fight gets serious when the high school decides to participate in an intercollegiate musical contest. The goal is to represent the school, but Las Populares and Las Divinas do not agree with each other. There is only one way: a competition that decides who will sing in public. Las Divinas think they have it in the bag, but Patito ruins their plans. Las Populares with the help of Patito who, despite her shyness to sing in public, with the help of Rodrigo succeed in winning the contest. Throughout the school year, Las Populares and Las Divinas wage a battle tinged with adventure, tricks, and adversities.

Six months after the before-mentioned, Ana has another baby (the son of Rodrigo) and Patito has changed her look thanks to her grandmother. She finds herself caught in an amorous discord on account of Giovanni, a newcomer to the community (but not a student at CAMP). Giovanni's arrival represents immediate competition to Mateo and all the other CAMP boys, yet he becomes Antonella's ally as she attempts to take Patito out of the Divinas' way. Meanwhile, Rodrigo wants to spend as much time as possible with his children and wife and great surprises await throughout the second chapter: a woman who will tell Bianca how to get a hold of Ana's body and get her out of her life; the return of Amaya's biological mother; Patito's quinceañera (a 15th birthday celebration, like a Sweet Sixteen); and the arrival of new loves, great friends and mortal enemies.

Patito comes to celebrate her 15th birthday, but Antonella wants to ruin her party. Antonella contrives a plot where she rigs a bucket, behind the scenes, that contains chicken gizzards. Antonella's father catches her and begs her to reconsider, warning her that if she chooses to go down this path it will have dire life consequences. Antonella reconsiders and has a change of heart without ceasing to divine.

Later, Mateo wants to dedicate a song to Patito, but Giovanni plans to do the same—he's stolen Mateo's song. Antonella, who knew Giovanni's plan, tells Mateo everything, and he knocks Giovanni out on stage, leaving him unconscious. Mateo finally sings the song with the K&B.

Patito and Mateo get together during the performance of the CAMP students where she asks him to be her boyfriend. Antonella asks Patito to forgive her for all the bad she's done. Patito tells her that she has nothing to forgive, that for her, they were always friends and they return to being so. Antonella becomes Johnny's girlfriend again. Finally, they show the viewer what their future was like and what they did, but they don't actually act it out. At the end of the final episode, is at Patito 15 party and she sings "Mundo de Caramelo" and that becomes The End.

== Soundtrack ==
Studio albums

- Atrévete a soñar (2009)
- Atrévete a soñar 2 (2009)

Compilations

- Atrévete a soñar 1.5 (2009)

DVDs

- Viviendo Atrévete a soñar (2009)

Live albums

- Atrévete a soñar: El concierto (2010)

== Awards ==
Year	Category	Nominee	Result
Premios Oye!
2009	Best telenovela, movie or TV series musical theme	"Mundo de caramelo"	Won
Lunas del Auditorio
2009	Family Spectacle	Atrévete a soñar, el show	Nominated
Kids' Choice Awards México
2010	Favorite Male Character of TV Series	Eleazar Gómez	Nominated
2010	Favorite Villain	Violeta Isfel	Won
2010	Favorite Female Character of TV Series	Violeta Isfel	Nominated
2010	Favorite Female Character of TV Series	Danna Paola	Nominated
2010	Promise Award	Danna Paola	Won
2010	Favorite Look	Violeta Isfel	Nominated
TVyNovelas Awards
2010	Best Female Antagonist	Cynthia Klitbo	Nominated
2010	Best Young Lead Actress	Danna Paola	Won
2010	Best Young Lead Actor	Eleazar Gómez	Nominated
2010	Best Co-star Actress	Violeta Isfel	Won
2010	Best Female Revelation	Samadhi	Won
2010	Best Musical Theme	"Mundo de caramelo"	Won
Premios Juventud
2011	Chica que me quita el sueño	Danna Paola	Nominated
