= Majestad de la Sierra =

- Origin: Chicago, Illinois, USA
- Genres: Duranguense
- Years active: 2008–present
- Labels: Univision
- Members: Beto Durán; Luis Gerardo Garcia; Guillermo Rocha; Alex Celis; Mario Flores; Jose Chiquis; Cris Duran
- Past members: Luis García; Miguel Rocha Jr.; Guillermo Rocha

Majestad de la Sierra is a Duranguense band that was formed in Mexico by former band member from K-Paz de la Sierra Beto Durán and Luis Diaz.

== Split ==
Eight months after Sergio Gómez death, Beto Durán and Luis Díaz made their Group Majestad De la Sierra on August 7, 2008. Due to problems with Miguel Galindo and Juan Gómez.

Their first album was released on March 10, 2009, called Nueva Ilussion (English: New Illusion). They already released their first song called "Eres Mi Obsecion"

== Discography ==
=== Albums ===
- 2009: Nueva Ilussion
- 2011: Claro que sí

== See also ==
- K-Paz de la Sierra
- AK-7
