= Luis Lauro =

- Born: Luis Lauro Moreno Flores; June 19, 1991 (age 34); Reynosa, Tamaulipas, Mexico
- Genres: Pop
- Website: http://www.luislauro.com/en/

Luis Lauro Moreno Flores (born June 19, 1991) is a Mexican singer, songwriter, composer and model.

== Biography ==
Luis Lauro was born in Reynosa, Tamaulipas, and grew up in México City. As a child he felt great attraction for music. He began his career by participating in various singing contest. At age 10 he participated in Joya launches a star, in this contest he auditioned in his hometown, 3000 children, from which they chose to go to participate in Monterrey, where he placed third. Later, at age 11 he was a member of the program Codigo fama. Its passage by this reality-school Televisa was what opened the doors to some producers and thus make themselves know within the company. For this reason he was called to join the group Burundi Kids. At age 13 he went to the U.S. to finish their studies and higher education to continue their classes in singing, dancing, musical compositions and performance in New York City and Los Angeles, California. On June 14, 2009 he was released his first self-titled album, backed by Universal Music Mexico, the new face of Pop, how is already known in the arts, was able to choose the producer of the material, a large music internationally Steve Churchyard, producer of stars such as Avril Lavigne, Sheryl Crow, Maroon 5 and Latinos Ricardo Arjona, Ricky Martin and Juanes. His three singles: Solo, Breath and Inevitable have impacted the various radio stations and video channels. Luis Lauro has been placed in the first sales sites in prestigious stores and Shiris Mixup music as well as in the digital universe. Dawn also released the album in which emphasizes his song Crushin (Muero por ti in Spanish) with the participation of Danna Paola and other songs like Mi chica ideal and Ángel.

== Discography ==
Luis Lauro (2009)

- Inevitable
- Aliento
- Solo (Including English version)
- No me busques
- Si te vas
- Ojos tristes
- Te quiero
- Después de ti
- Ya no puedo más (Including English version)
- Dime que sí
- No te importo
- Me enamoro más

Amanecer (2011)

- Amanecer
- Like It Or Not
- De afuera hacia adentro
- Quiero vivir
- Muero por tí
- Ángel (Including English version)
- Flavor of the Week
- Crushin

Muero por ti (2013)

- Ángel
- Mi chica ideal
- Crushing
- Muero por ti
- Flavor of the Week

Adiós (2016)

- Adios (Single)
