= Yo quiero bailar (song) =

Single by Sonia & Selena

from the album Yo quiero bailar
- Released: 2001
- Recorded: 2001
- Genre: Pop, Dance music

Music video
- "Yo quiero bailar" on YouTube

"Yo quiero bailar" (English: "I Want to Dance") is a song in Spanish by Sonia & Selena. The Spanish duo bid to represent Spain in the Eurovision Song Contest 2001 with the song, but lost the bid to David Civera and his song "Dile que la quiero". "Yo quiero bailar" finished 9th overall in the Spanish national final.

The song was selected for the 2001 OGAE Second Chance Contest, which reviews the non-qualifying songs for Eurovision and chooses the best. Overall, the song ranked 2nd out of 20 songs (with a non-qualifying song by the Swedish band Barbados, "Allt som jag ser," taking first place).

Despite not being chosen for Eurovision, "Yo queiro bailar" became a hit in Spain and internationally. It was included in Sonia & Selena's debut and only studio album of the same title, Yo quiero bailar. The single made it to #1 in the Spanish radio charts, ranked in the Top 5 of the Spanish Singles Chart, and became popular throughout Latin America and the world.

== Cover versions ==
The song has been the subject of a number of cover versions in Spanish and other languages.

- Georgina Verbaan, a Dutch singer and actress, released an up-tempo bilingual dance version of the song in Spanish and English. Video on YouTube
- The Canadian duo Tadros covered the song in their 2004 debut album Yo Quiero Bailar, which includes three versions of the song (in Spanish, English, and French). Video on YouTube
- A humorous take on the song is found in the 2006 album by Los Sultanes, also entitled "Yo queiro bailar."
- Axé Bahia, a Brazilian Eurodance/Axé music group, covered the song in Portuguese, with a modification in the lyrics ("Eu quero bailar em Acapulco") for AcaFest 2003 in Mexico. Video on YouTube
- Patricia Manterola, Mexican singer covered the song, for AcaFest 2005 in Mexico.
- The contestants of the Spanish TV contest Operación Triunfo 2025 covered the song on the first episode.
