= Nalaya Brown =

Spanish singer

- Also known as: NALAYA
- Born: Natalia Rodríguez Padrón; November 19, 1983 (age 42); Tenerife, Spain
- Genres: House, Electro House, Soul
- Years active: 2002–present

Nalaya Brown (Tenerife, 19 November 1983) is a Spanish singer who works on the European dance circuit. Her voice has rhythm&blues, soul and latin influences. She sang in clubs in Spain, South America and half Europe. Nalaya attended to Rock In Rio Brasil, Rio Music Conference, Privilege Ibiza, Amnesia Ibiza, Ushuaia Hotel Ibiza, Fabrik Madrid, Cavalli Dubai, Privilege Buzios, Pachá Buzios, The Week Brasil, Circuit Festival Barcelona...

Also, Brown is the voice of the Spanish production 'SuperMartxé', the most important party in Europe, with a World Guinness record of capacity with more than 15.000 people in one club. The videoclip of SuperMartXé anthem, was sung by Nalaya and filmed with Paris Hilton.

In 2015, Brown attended the Spanish TV talent show La Voz (The Voice, Talent Show), where she arrives to live acts, winning her previous battles, and saved by Antonio Orozco who said about her that she was ".. an authentic revelation", with performances of Lady Gaga - "Born This Way" (Audiciones a ciegas) and Beyoncé - "Crazy in Love" (Directos).

== Awards ==
- 2014: Best International Vocalist (DNA Balada Brasil)
- 2015: Best Vocalist (VMA Vicious Music Awards)

== Discography ==
- 2018: «Dreaming» (Albert Neve & Abel Ramos feat. Nalaya)
- 2017: «Una vez más» (Nalaya feat. Danny Romero)
- 2017: «Don't Stop Moving» (Nalaya feat. Breno Barreto)
- 2017: «Be Mine» (Nalaya feat. Dan Slater y JimJam)
- 2016: «Love Me Like A Diva» (Yinon Yahel feat. Nalaya)
- 2015: «Call To Me» (Roger Sanchez feat. Nalaya)
- 2014: «Arena» (Carlos Gallardo feat. Nalaya) - GT2 Records
- 2013: «Waterfall» (Fran Marín feat. Nalaya) - Sony Music
- 2013: «Leave Me Alone» (Felipe Guerra feat. Nalaya) - Universal Music Brasil
- 2012: «Let You Go» (Christopher S. feat. Nalaya) - Roster
- 2011: «Cuba» (Abel The Kid & Luis Ponce feat. Nalaya) - Subliminal Records
- 2011: «Feel Alive» (Filipe Guerra feat. Nalaya) (2011)
- 2010: «Don't Stop Till You Get Enough» (Juanjo Martín & Albert Neve feat. Nalaya) - Blanco y Negro
- 2010: «Over You» (Nalaya & Leo Blanco, Vitti & Hugo Sánchez)
- 2010: «Mecandance» (Nacho Cano feat. Nalaya)
- 2010: «SuperMartXé» (Juanjo Martín & Albert Neve feat. Nalaya)
- 2010: «Love At Loft» (Dj Puku, Axel & Nalaya)
- 2018: «Wepa» (Karin Hass & David El Olmo feat. Nalaya) (2008)

== External References ==
- Nalaya's Facebook | Official
