= Sonia & Selena =

Spanish Latin pop duo

- Origin: Ibiza, Spain
- Genres: Latin pop
- Years active: 2000–2002; 2011; 2024–2025
- Labels: Vale Music; Blanco y Negro Music
- Members: Sonia Basseda (Madoc); Selena Leo

Sonia & Selena, also known as Sonia y Selena, was a Spanish Latin pop duo consisting of Sonia Basseda (Madoc) and Selena Leo. They gained success with their album Yo quiero bailar (2001) (Spanish: I want to dance), which featured the title track, "Yo quiero bailar". The duo dissolved in 2002 but reunited in 2011 and then again in 2024.

== History ==
Sonia "Madoc" Basseda (born on October 23, 1974) and Selena Leo (born on August 23, 1975) formed Sonia & Selena in 2000. They tried out to represent Spain in the Eurovision Song Contest 2001 but were not selected. Their debut album Yo quiero bailar received gold and platinum certification in Spain, Latin America and Europe and sold over 1,000,000 copies.

Despite their successes, the group disbanded in the spring of 2002 due to their constant fights.

After the disbanding of the group, Selena pursued a solo career making two albums with sales of 100,000 copies. In 2005, she participated in the second season of reality TV show The Farm but she only stayed in the game for two weeks. In 2007, after six years of musical absence, Sonia released "Dame vida" and "Crazy for Love". In the summer of 2008, she released "Verano de luna" digitally.

In 2011, they re-released "Yo quiero bailar", although without much success. They also tried out for 'Eurovision' again, but were rejected because they did not comply with the regulations of that year.

In October 2024, they reunited for a concert in Palau Sant Jordi in Barcelona. The following month, they participated in Benidorm Fest 2025, the Spanish selection for the Eurovision Song Contest 2025, where they performed the song "Reinas" but did not advance to the final.

== Discography ==
=== Album ===
- Yo quiero bailar (2001)
