= Alexander Acha =

Mexican singer-songwriter

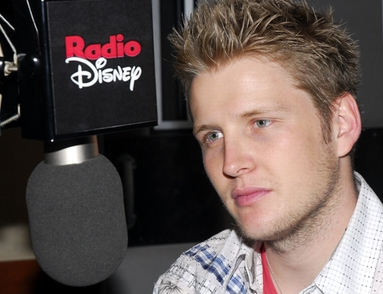

Background information
- Born: Raúl Alexander Acha Johnson-Alemán; January 25, 1985 (age 41); Mexico City, Mexico
- Genres: Latin Pop
- Occupation: Singer-songwriter
- Years active: 2007–present
- Label: Warner Music Mexico
- Website: www.alexanderacha.com

Raúl Alexander Acha Johnson-Alemán (born January 25, 1985) is a Mexican singer-songwriter.

== Life ==
He is the son of Mexican pop singer Emmanuel and Mercedes Aleman, who taught Alexander piano and other instruments. Acha is also a pianist and a Berklee College of Music alumnus.

He was raised as a Roman Catholic and still attends Mass. His debut album Voy (2008) reached gold status in his native country, with Te Amo being his first single. On November 5, 2009, he won the Latin Grammy for Best New Artist.

== Discography ==
=== Albums ===
- Voy (2008)
- La vida es... (2011)
- Claroscuro (2014)
- Luz (2018)
- Las Italianas (2022)
