= Los Sultanes =

Argentine tropical music band

Los Sultanes (The Sultans) is an Argentine cumbia band formed in 1992 and comprising Jorge Kazmer (vocals), Jorge Valeggiani (drum), José Luis Navarro (keyboards), Adrián Lexicon (güiro), Gonzalo Rodríguez (bass) and Marcelo López (keyboards). The band is best known for its humorous songs dealing with gay and transgender-related topics.

== History ==
They band's members started meeting in 1992 and wrote funny lyrics together, eventually playing at bars and clubs in their neighbourhood. That same year they recorded their first album, Los Sultanes del Amor (The Sultans of Love), which became well-known across the country. In 1995 they released their second album, Habilitámelo (Allow it to me), which had a large following in the tropical music scene of Argentina.

In 1998, Zona Roja (Red Light District), an album released simultaneously in the United States, Spain and Mexico, reached a much larger audience. It included hits such as "Decile que lo quiero: Estoy saliendo con un chabón" ("Tell him I love him: I'm dating a dude") and "El Chupete (¡Agente, agente!)" ("The Pacifier (Officer, officer!)") which drew attention from young and old alike, making the album triple platinum in Argentina; it has sold more than 30,000 copies. They toured Chile (where the album went gold), Uruguay (platinum album), Brazil (where they were invited by the singer Xuxa), Mexico (participating in the festival "Millennium" in Acapulco) and Spain.

In 1999 they released the follow-up Son o se Hacen (Are they pretending or not?), which included hits such as "El Tucanazo" and "La Reina de la Zona Roja" ("Queen of the Red Light District"). In 2000, Vuelta y Vuelta (Round and Around), an album recorded in Spain, achieved great success, with the record company Vale Music selling 200,000 copies.

== Members ==
- Adrián "Cocker" Lexicon (güiro and vocals)
- Gonzalo "Rivaldo" Rodríguez (bass)
- Jorge "El Topo" Kazmer (vocals)
- Jorge "Koke" Valeggiani (drums)
- José Luis "cachet" Navarro (keyboards)
- Marcelo "Phantom" López (keyboards)

== Discography ==
- 1995: Habilitámelo
- 1998: Zona Roja
- 1999: Son o se hacen
- 2001: Vuelta y vuelta
- 2003: Sultanes.com
- 2005: Piko piko
- 2006: Yo quiero bailar
- 2007: Disco Gay
- 2008: Espectacular
- 2009: Dale, Maraca
- 2010: Mundo Sultán
- 2013: De aquí a la eternidad
