= Danna Paola =

Mexican singer and actress (born 1995)

Danna
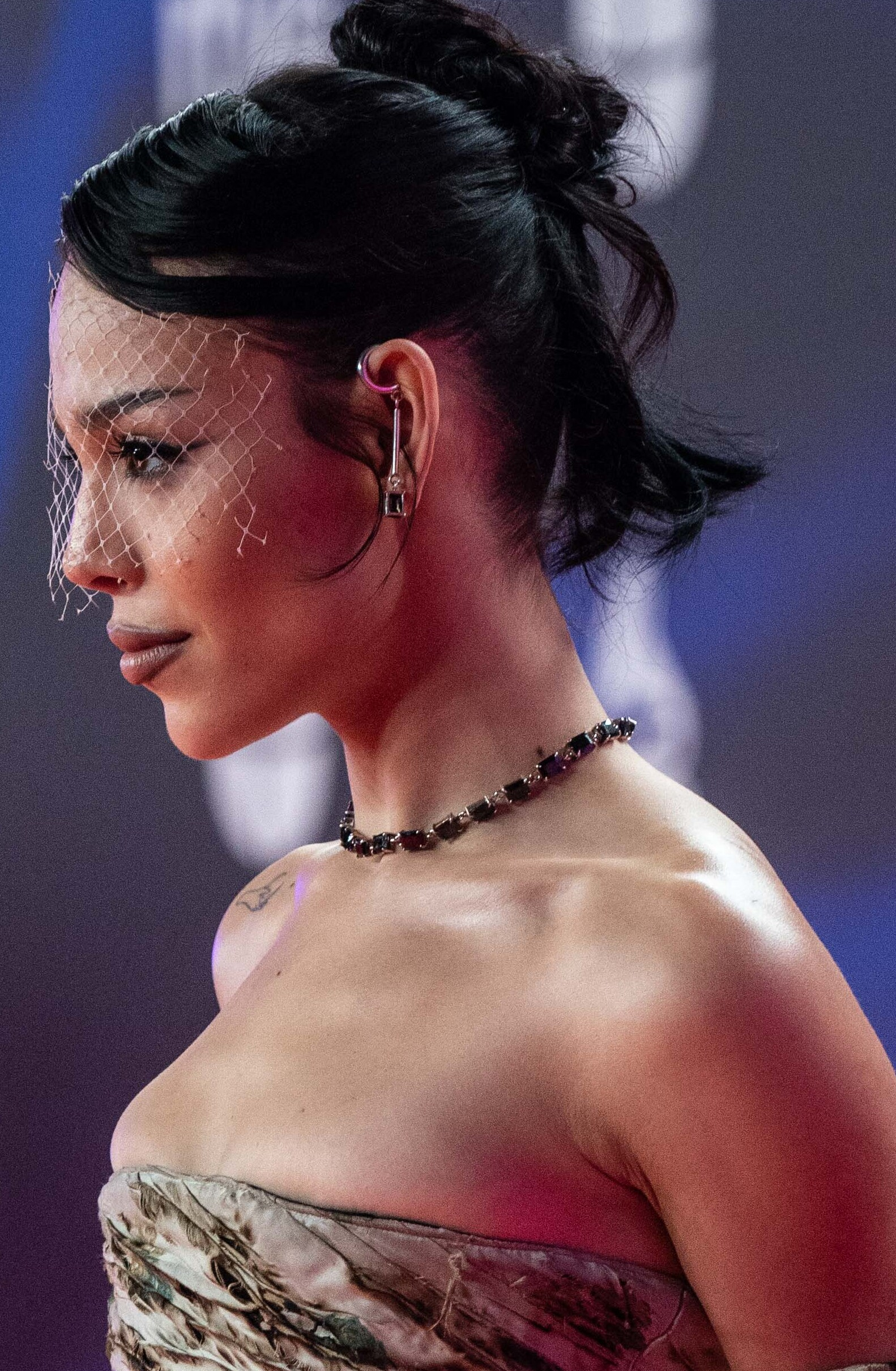
- Danna at the 24th Latin Grammy Awards red carpet in 2023
- Born: Danna Paola Rivera Munguía; 23 June 1995 (age 31); Mexico City, Mexico
- Other name: Danna Paola
- Occupations: Actress; singer; songwriter; model
- Years active: 1999–present
- Partner: Alex Hoyer
- Musical career
- Genres: Latin pop; Latin R&B
- Instruments: Vocals; piano; guitar
- Label: Universal Music Mexico

Danna Paola Rivera Munguía (born 23 June 1995), known mononymously as Danna and formerly as Danna Paola, is a Mexican singer-songwriter, actress, and model. She began her career as a child actress and singer, starring in numerous television projects. She achieved early recognition as the protagonist of the children's telenovela Amy, la niña de la mochila azul and later rose to greater fame for her starring role in the 2009 teen telenovela Atrévete a soñar. Her prominence grew with her Latin American Spanish dubbing of Rapunzel in Disney's 2010 animated film Tangled, for which she recorded the Spanish-language soundtrack. She gained international recognition for portraying Lucrecia "Lu" Montesinos in the Netflix Spanish teen drama series Élite.

== Early life ==
Danna Paola Rivera Munguía was born and raised in Mexico City. She is the daughter of Patricia Munguía and Juan José Rivera Arellano, the former singer of Grupo Ciclón and Los Caminantes. Her parents divorced during her childhood. She has an older sister, Vania Rivera Munguía.

== Acting career ==
=== 1999–2003: Early career ===
Danna Paola's acting career began in 1999 when at age 4 she and her sister attended Televisa's casting call in Mexico City for Plaza Sésamo, the Mexican version of Sesame Street. Both were later cast on the show and appeared in several episodes.

=== 2004–2012: Breakout success ===
In 2004, she was chosen as the lead in the successful children's series Amy, la niña de la mochila azul. Her second studio album, Océano, soon followed. A year later, she was the female lead of Pablo y Andrea, the television adaptation of the classic novel The Adventures of Tom Sawyer. Over the next several years, she participated in multiple television series produced by Televisa.

In 2009, she was cast as "Patito" in Atrévete a Soñar, the Mexican remake of the popular Argentine children's telenovela Patito Feo. Rivera filmed two seasons of the show and production was concluded in late 2009. Atrévete a Soñar marked Rivera's transition from children's to teen telenovelas. She and the cast of the telenovela recorded two soundtracks and toured across Mexico in order to promote the show. The telenovela and its soundtrack were commercially successful throughout Mexico and Latin America. The soundtrack was certified double platinum in Mexico.

In late 2010, she voiced Rapunzel for the Latin American Spanish-language dubbing of the Disney film Tangled and participated in the film's Spanish-language soundtrack.

=== 2013–2015: Wicked and other projects ===
In May 2013, Rivera auditioned for the first Spanish-language production of the Broadway musical Wicked in Mexico City. She auditioned for both Glinda and Elphaba, performing "Popular" and "Defying Gravity". Later that same month, the final cast for the Mexican production was announced, with Rivera cast as Elphaba. The production opened in Mexico City at Teatro Telcel on 17 October 2013 and closed on 18 January 2015. Critics in Mexico, as well as the play's original composer, Stephen Schwartz, praised her performance. In addition to being well received by critics, the play was also a commercial success in Mexico City. During its first 10 weeks, Wicked sold over 100,000 tickets and had more than 100 performances; it broke a box office record, making it one of the most successful theatre productions in Mexico's history. At the age of 18, Rivera was the youngest person to play the role of Elphaba in a professional theatre production.

In January 2014, she was cast in the movie Saving Sara Cruz, a modern-day remake of the 1992 film The Bodyguard. Production on the film never began and the project was later shelved.

In March 2014, Rivera debuted as fashion designer, collaborating with the popular Mexican clothing brand Sexy Jeans. Her line, "Danna Paola, by Sexy Jeans", was commercially successful, with products selling out across Mexico.

In August 2014, Rivera participated in the ABBA tribute album Dancing Queens, recording a cover of "Take A Chance On Me". "Take A Chance On Me" was released as single on 2 September 2014 and debuted at number 1 on iTunes México.

On 29 October 2014, she performed "No hay bien", the Spanish-language version of "No Good Deed", to a sold-out crowd at the Auditorio Nacional for the Lunas del Auditorio award show. That night, Wicked received an award in the "Broadway Show" category.

Rivera appeared in over 300 performances of Wicked from 2013 to early 2015. Following the conclusion of Wicked, she was invited by producer Alex Gou to join the cast of the musical Hoy No Me Puedo Levantar, where she played the lead role of Maria and went on tour throughout Mexico.

In August 2015, she recorded the duet "Mientras Me Enamoras" with Mexican singer Lalo Brito. A music video was also filmed, and it premiered on Brito's YouTube channel in September 2015. In mid-2015, Rivera moved to Miami to film the telenovela drama ¿Quién es quién?. The project was her first telenovela role outside of Televisa. Filming for the program concluded in September 2015. ¿Quién es quién? began airing weeknights in the U.S. on Telemundo on 9 February 2016.

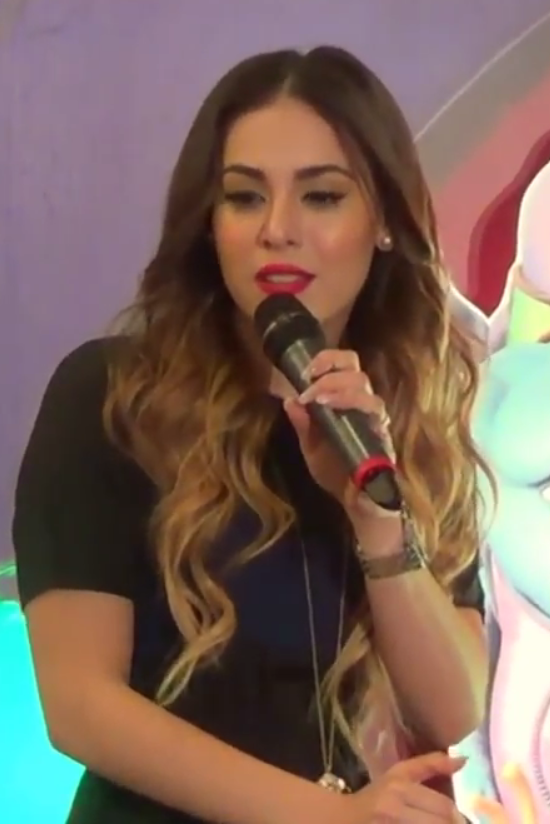
Danna Paola in 2015

=== 2016–present: Acting projects, Élite ===
In early 2016, Paola filmed in the Mexican movie ¡Como va! Lo más sencillo es complicarlo todo (later renamed Lo más sencillo es complicarlo todo), on location in Mexico City, Puerto Vallarta, and Querétaro. The movie was released in Mexican cinemas on 26 January 2018. In mid-April 2016, she was confirmed as a cast member in the telenovela drama La Doña, produced by Telemundo. The telenovela filmed in Mexico and premiered in November 2016. The finale aired on Telemundo in the U.S. on 1 May 2017.

In 2017, Paola was cast in the Telemundo bio-series José José: El príncipe de la canción, based on the life of Mexican singer José José. Paola played famed Mexican singer-songwriter, Lucero, and appears in 4 episodes of the show. The miniseries premiered on Telemundo on 15 January 2018. In late January 2018, Paola was scheduled to begin filming a role in the bio series based on the life of Mexican actress Silva Pinal. She later dropped out before filming began and instead revealed that she was cast in the Netflix original Spanish teen thriller television series Élite. Production for the television show forced Rivera to move to Madrid for six months starting in January 2018. She was cast in the program following a long audition process in 2017. The show was shot in 4K and it premiered globally on Netflix in October 2018; Rivera went on to star in three seasons of the series. In 2019, she was cast as a judge on the singing-competition series La Academia for TV Azteca. In 2021, she was cast as a mentor in Spanish singing competition series Top Star. ¿Cuánto vale tu voz? for Telecinco.

Following her exit from Élite, Rivera decided to quit acting and focus on her music career, but has stated that she is open to returning to acting in the future. Rivera dubbed the character of Elphaba for the Latin American Spanish version of the 2024 musical film Wicked, and its 2025 sequel.

== Music career ==
In 2011, she began the production for her fourth solo studio album which also served as her debut album as a "grown-up" solo recording artist. Her previous discography included songs for telenovelas, children's music, and film soundtracks. She revealed that she wanted her new album to reflect her growth as an artist and shed her image as a child actress. "Ruleta", written by Mexican pop singer Paty Cantú, was announced as the album's lead single. The official music video premiered on Paola's official VEVO channel on 14 March 2012. The single rose to number 32 on the Top Mexican Airplay charts in July 2012. In-mid February 2016, she announced that her upcoming single, "Baila hasta caer", would be released in March for radio and digital download. The song was recorded in Miami sometime during the filming of her telenovela ¿Quién es quién?. As part of the 2018 film release for Lo más sencillo es complicarlo todo, she released the single "¿Dónde estabas tú?" in November 2017. The single, "Oye Pablo", was released on 29 August 2019. In 2020 she released the album Sie7e +, which was followed by K.O. in 2021. She featured on Aitana's 2023 single "AQYNE".

== Endorsements ==
In mid-January 2016, Paola was revealed as the new face of L'Oreal Paris's "Casting Crème Gloss" hair color line for the Latin American market. The line is a collaboration between L'Oreal's Excellence and Preference lines. As part of the promotion, Paola dyed her hair and appeared in print and television ads for the brand.

In September 2023, she was named as a global brand ambassador for the cosmetics company, MAC. The partnership lasted through 2024.

== Personal life ==
In a 2021 social media post, she revealed that she suffered from anxiety, panic attacks, and depression during her time living in Madrid while filming the Netflix television series, Elite. She resides in Mexico City.

== Discography ==
- Mi Globo Azul (2002)
- Oceano (2004)
- Chiquita Pero Picosa (2005)
- Danna Paola (2012)
- Sie7e + (2020)
- K.O. (2021)
- Childstar (2024)
- Visions (2026)

== Filmography ==
=== Film ===
| Year | Title | Roles | Notes |
|---|---|---|---|
| 2008 | Tear This Heart Out | Lilia Ascencio (age 12) | |
| 2010 | Tangled | Rapunzel | Voice role; Latin-American Spanish dubbing |
| 2015 | Home | Tip Tucci | Voice role; Latin-American Spanish dubbing |
| 2018 | Lo más sencillo es complicarlo todo | Renata | |
| 2021 | Raya and the Last Dragon | Raya | Voice role; Latin-American Spanish dubbing |
| 2024 | Wicked | Elphaba | Latin-American Spanish dubbing |
| 2025 | Wicked: For Good | Elphaba | Latin-American Spanish dubbing |

=== Television ===
| Year | Title | Roles | Notes |
|---|---|---|---|
| 2000 | Rayito de luz | Lupita Lerma | 4 episodes |
| 2001 | María Belén | María Belén García Marín | Lead role; 94 episodes |
| 2002 | La familia P. Luche | María Belén García Marín | Episode: "Ludovico en la escuela" |
| 2002–2003 | ¡Vivan los niños! | Estrella | Recurring role; 3 episodes |
| 2004 | Alegrijes y Rebujos | Herself | Episode: "La fiesta" |
| 2004 | Amy, la niña de la mochila azul | Amy Granados-Betancourt Arteaga | Lead role; 115 episodes |
| 2005 | Contra viento y marea | Natalia Ríos (child) | Episode: "Contra viento y marea" |
| 2005 | Pablo y Andrea | Andrea Saavedra | Co-lead role; 75 episodes |
| 2007 | Muchachitas como tú | Paola Velásquez | Recurring role; 1 episode |
| 2007 | Objetos perdidos | Child | Episode: "Objeto 8" |
| 2007 | XHDRbZ | Golden Girl | Episode: "Niños de oro" |
| 2008 | Querida enemiga | Bettina Aguilar Ugarte | Main role; 103 episodes |
| 2008 | La rosa de Guadalupe | Samantha | Episode: "Adiós a la calle" |
| 2009–2010 | Atrévete a soñar | Patricia "Patito" Peralta Castro | Lead role; 261 episodes |
| 2009 | Plaza Sésamo | Patricia "Patito" Peralta Castro | Season 12 episode 11 |
| 2013 | Como dice el dicho | Mayra Mata | Episode: "Los deseos se cumplen" |
| 2015–2016 | ¿Quién es quién? | Paloma Hernández | Main role; 118 episodes |
| 2016–2020 | La Doña | Monica Hernández | Main role (season 1), 120 episodes; guest star (season 2), 12 episodes |
| 2018 | José José, el príncipe de la canción | Lucero Arcadia Méndez | 11 episodes |
| 2018–2020 | Elite | Lucrecia "Lu" Montesinos Hendrich | Main role (season 1-3); 24 episodes |
| 2021 | Top Star. ¿Cuánto vale tu voz? | Herself / Mentor | |
| 2023 | Drag Race México | Herself / Guest judge | Episode: "Drag Business" |
| 2024 | RuPaul's Drag Race Global All Stars | Herself / Guest judge | Episode: "Global Talent Extravaganza: Part 2" |

== Theatre ==
| Year | Title | Role | Notes |
|---|---|---|---|
| 2003 | Regina: Un Musical Para Una Nación Que Despierta | Regina | |
| 2004 | Anita la huerfanita | Anita | Lead role |
| 2013–15 | Wicked | Elphaba | First production in Spanish |
| 2015-16 | Hoy no me puedo levantar | Maria | Lead role; musical |
