= La Voz Senior (Spanish TV series) season 2 =

Season of television series

La Voz Senior
- Season 2
- Hosted by: Eva González
- Coaches: David Bustamante; Pastora Soler; Rosana; Antonio Orozco
- Winner: Naida Abanovich
- Winning coach: David Bustamante
- Runner-up: Nico Fioole

Release
- Original network: Antena 3
- Original release: December 10 – December 27, 2020

Season chronology
- ← Previous; Season 1 Next → Season 3

The second season of La Voz Senior started airing on 10 December 2020 on Antena 3. Antonio Orozco was the only coach returning from the previous season, joined by debutants David Bustamante, Pastora Soler, and Rosana Arbelo, who replace David Bisbal, Pablo López, and Paulina Rubio. Eva González returned for her second season as host.

Naida Abanovich won the season, marking David Bustamante’s first win as a coach.

== Coaches ==
La Voz Senior season 2 coaches

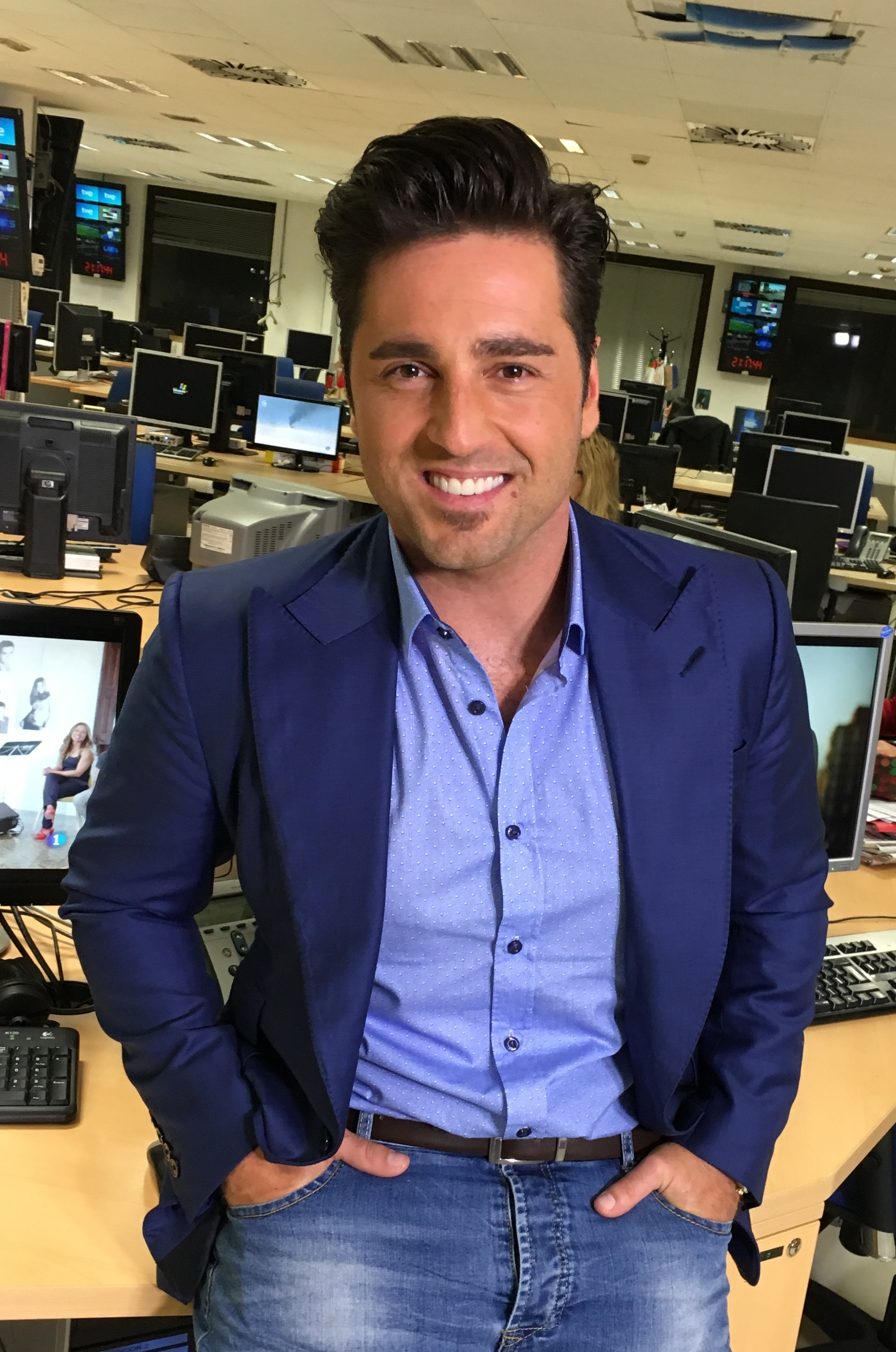
David Bustamante

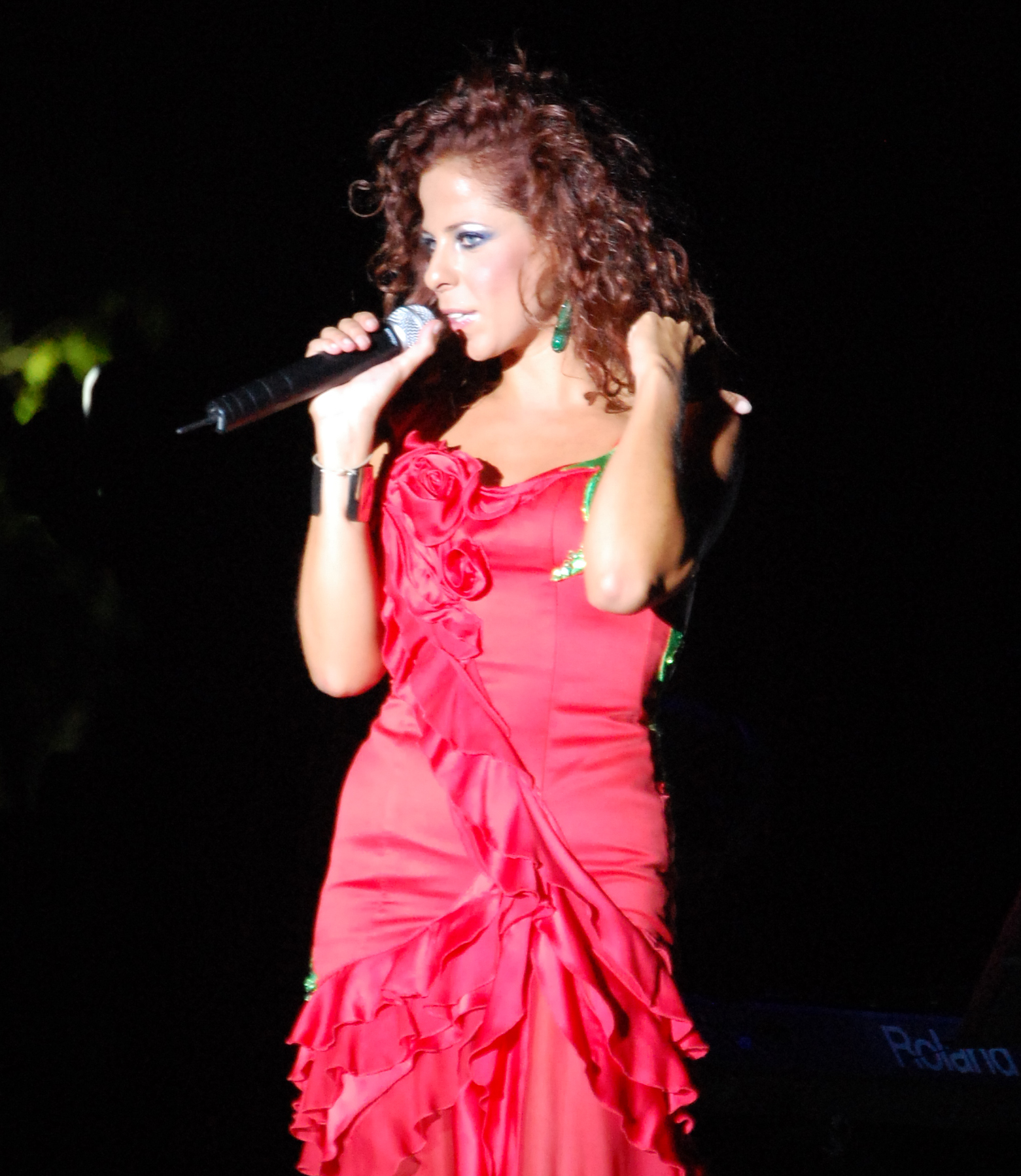
Pastora Soler

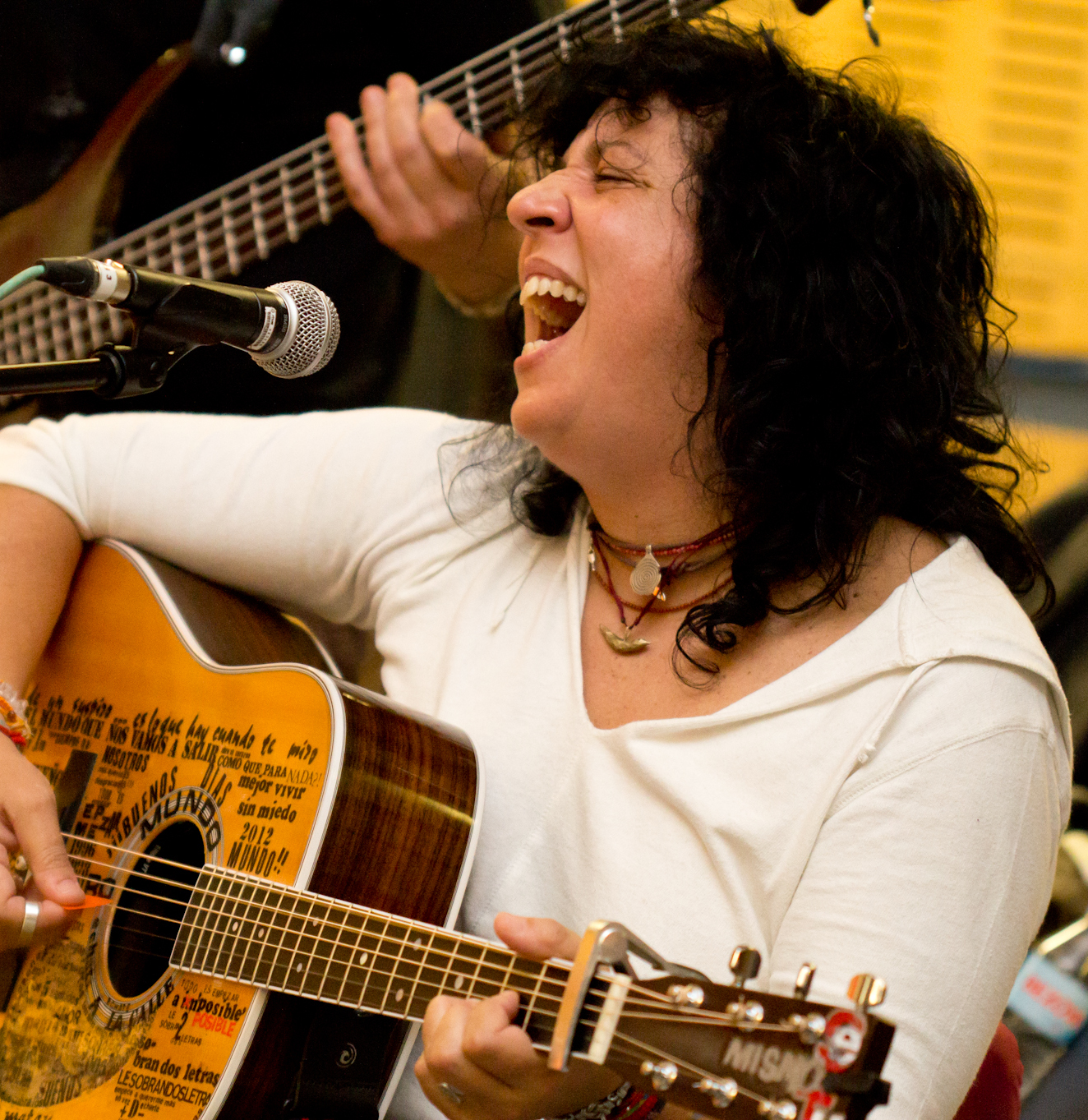
Rosana

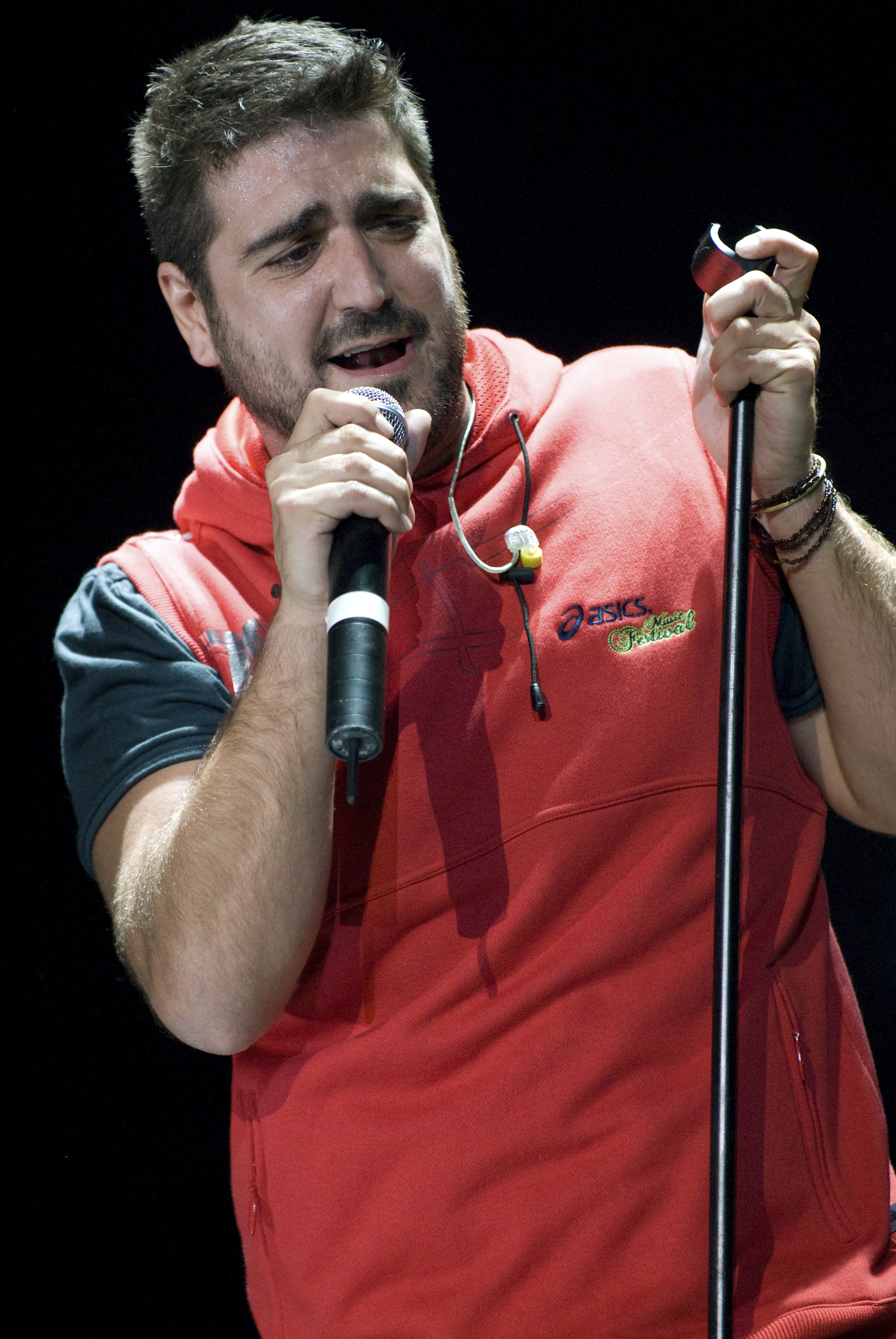
Antonio Orozco

On 8 November 2019, it was announced that Antonio Orozco would remain on the panel for the second season and would be joined by debutant coaches Rosana Arbelo, David Bustamante, and Pastora Soler, who would replace David Bisbal, Pablo López, and Paulina Rubio.

== Teams ==
Color key

- Winner
- Runner-up
- Third place
- Eliminated in the Finale
- Eliminated in the Knockouts

| Coaches | Top 21 Artists | | | | | |
|---|---|---|---|---|---|---|
| David Bustamante | | | | | | |
| David Bustamante | Naida Abanovich | Fernando Liben | María José Moreno | Toni Fuentes | Soledad Luna | |
| Pastora Soler | | | | | | |
| Pastora Soler | Fernando Demon | Juana Zamora | Alfonso Pahino | Jaime Costa | Ritchie Benítez | |
| Rosana | | | | | | |
| Rosana | Mingo Fernández | Los Tres Aries | Carlos Yebenes | Pepita García | Stefano Palatchi | |
| Antonio Orozco | | | | | | |
| Antonio Orozco | Nico Fioole | Emi Bonilla | Elia Galán | Joaquin Ascón | Juani Álvarez | Las Senior Copleras |

== Blind auditions ==
In the Blind auditions, each coach had to complete their teams with 5 contestants. Each coach had one Block to prevent another one from getting a contestant.

Color key

| ✔ | Coach pressed "QUIERO TU VOZ" button |
| | Artist defaulted to a coach's team |
| | Artist elected a coach's team |
| | Artist received a second chance from special guest José Mercé, and advanced to the Knockouts |
| | Artist eliminated with no coach pressing his or her “QUIERO TU VOZ” button |
| ✘ | Coach pressed the "QUIERO TU VOZ" button, but was blocked by Bustamante from getting the artist |
| ✘ | Coach pressed the "QUIERO TU VOZ" button, but was blocked by Pastora from getting the artist |
| ✘ | Coach pressed the "QUIERO TU VOZ" button, but was blocked by Rosana from getting the artist |
| ✘ | Coach pressed the "QUIERO TU VOZ" button, but was blocked by Antonio from getting the artist |

=== Episode 1 (10 December) ===
| Order | Artist | Age | Song | Coach's and artist's choices | | | |
| Order | Artist | Age | Song | Bustamante | Pastora | Rosana | Antonio |
|---|---|---|---|---|---|---|---|
| 1 | Emi Bonilla | 84 | "La Salvadora" | ✔ | ✘ | ✔ | ✔ |
| 2 | Andrés Caparrós | 75 | "Antonio Vargas Heredia" | – | – | – | – |
| 3 | Nico Fioole | 83 | "Just a Gigolo" | ✔ | ✔ | ✔ | ✔ |
| 4 | Jaime Costa | 61 | "Qué será" | – | ✔ | – | – |
| 5 | Los Tres Aries | 67–76 | "Si tú me dices ven" | ✔ | ✔ | ✔ | ✔ |
| 6 | Juani Álvarez | 64 | "Sombras Nada Más" | – | – | – | –^{1} |
| 7 | Naida Abanovich | 67 | "O mio babbino caro" | ✔ | ✔ | ✔ | – |
| 8 | Juana Zamora | 68 | "Marinero de Luces" | ✔ | ✔ | – | – |
| 9 | Black Stones | – | "Have You Ever Seen the Rain?" | – | – | – | – |
| 10 | Mingo Fernández | 64 | "What a Wonderful World" | ✔ | ✔ | ✔ | ✘ |
| 11 | Maria Coral del Pozo | 63 | "Puro Teatro" | – | – | – | – |
| 12 | Alfonso Pahino | 67 | "Insurrección" | ✔ | ✔ | – | – |
| 13 | Antonio Baños | 75 | "Hound Dog" | – | – | – | – |
| 14 | María José Moreno | 68 | "Al alba" | ✔ | – | – | – |

Note

- ^1 : Juani Álvarez was chosen to come back to the competition; she joined Team Antonio.

=== Episode 2 (11 December) ===
| Order | Artist | Age | Song | Coach's and artist's choices | | | |
| Order | Artist | Age | Song | Bustamante | Pastora | Rosana | Antonio |
|---|---|---|---|---|---|---|---|
| 1 | Toni Fuentes | 61 | "La Vie en Rose" | ✔ | – | – | – |
| 2 | Fernando Demon | 65 | "A Change Is Gonna Come" | ✔ | ✔ | ✔ | ✔ |
| 3 | Gregorio Suárez | 66 | "Vivir Así es Morir de Amor" | – | – | – | – |
| 4 | Elia Galán | 79 | "Soy Lo Prohibido" | ✔ | ✔ | ✔ | ✔ |
| 5 | Pepa Chacón | 66 | "Cómo Han Pasado los Años" | – | – | – | – |
| 6 | Fernando Liben | 63 | "Casi Te Envidio" | ✔ | – | ✔ | ✔ |
| 7 | Carlos Yebenes | 61 | "Got You on My Mind" | – | – | ✔ | – |
| 8 | Pepita García | 81 | "Light My Fire" | – | – | ✔ | – |
| 9 | Ritchie Benitez | 66 | "Roxanne" | – | ✔ | – | ~~✘~~^{2} |
| 10 | Arthur Hansen | 69 | "Unchained Melody" | – | Team full | – | – |
| 11 | Soledad Luna | 62 | "Si amanece" | ✔ | Team full | ✘ | ✔ |
| 12 | Las Senior Copleras | 65–80 | "De Andalucia Soy" | Team full | Team full | ✔ | ✔ |
| 13 | Stefano Palatchi | 60 | "Smile" | Team full | Team full | ✔ | ✔ |
| 14 | Joaquin Ascón | 60 | "Aunque tú no lo sepas" | Team full | Team full | Team full | ✔ |

Note

- ^2 : Pastora blocked Antonio, but he didn't press his button. As her team was full, Pastora didn't need a second chance to block.

== The Knockouts ==
In the Knockout round, also labeled as "The Semifinal", each coach had all their artists to compete in a Knockout. At the end of all performances, the coach could only advance with two of the artists into the Finale. Coaches received help from their advisors: Pitingo for Team Bustamante, David DeMaría for Team Pastora, Álex Ubago for Team Rosana, and Cami for Team Antonio.

Color key:

| Artist won the Knockout and advanced to the Finale |
| Artist lost the Knockout and was eliminated |

| Episode | Coach | Order | Artist | Song | Result |
|---|---|---|---|---|---|
| Episode 3 (17 December) | Antonio Orozco | 1 | Emi Bonilla | "Niña de Fuego" | Advanced |
| Episode 3 (17 December) | Antonio Orozco | 2 | Elia Galán | "Esperaré" | Eliminated |
| Episode 3 (17 December) | Antonio Orozco | 3 | Las Senior Copleras | "La morena de mi copla" | Eliminated |
| Episode 3 (17 December) | Antonio Orozco | 4 | Joaquín Ascón | "Clara" | Eliminated |
| Episode 3 (17 December) | Antonio Orozco | 5 | Nico Fioole | "I've Got You Under My Skin" | Advanced |
| Episode 3 (17 December) | Antonio Orozco | 6 | Juani Álvarez | "Silencio por un Torero" | Eliminated |
| Episode 3 (17 December) | Pastora Soler | 7 | Ritchie Benítez | "Don't Stop Me Now" | Eliminated |
| Episode 3 (17 December) | Pastora Soler | 8 | Alfonso Pahino | "De amor ya no se muere" | Eliminated |
| Episode 3 (17 December) | Pastora Soler | 9 | Juana Zamora | "Mi amante amigo" | Advanced |
| Episode 3 (17 December) | Pastora Soler | 10 | Jaime Costa | "Yolanda" | Eliminated |
| Episode 3 (17 December) | Pastora Soler | 11 | Fernando Demon | "The Best" | Advanced |
| Episode 4 (18 December) | David Bustamante | 1 | Naida Abanovich | "Tosca" | Advanced |
| Episode 4 (18 December) | David Bustamante | 2 | María José Moreno | "Volver" | Eliminated |
| Episode 4 (18 December) | David Bustamante | 3 | Fernando Liben | "Cómo Fue" | Advanced |
| Episode 4 (18 December) | David Bustamante | 4 | Toni Fuentes | "Symphatique" | Eliminated |
| Episode 4 (18 December) | David Bustamante | 5 | Soledad Luna | "Paloma brava" | Eliminated |
| Episode 4 (18 December) | Rosana | 6 | Pepita García | "Something" | Eliminated |
| Episode 4 (18 December) | Rosana | 7 | Carlos Yébenes | "Call Me The Breeze" | Eliminated |
| Episode 4 (18 December) | Rosana | 8 | Mingo Fernández | "Se Te Olvida" | Advanced |
| Episode 4 (18 December) | Rosana | 9 | Stefano Palatchi | "L.O.V.E." | Eliminated |
| Episode 4 (18 December) | Rosana | 10 | Los Tres Aries | "El Reloj" | Advanced |

== Finale ==
In the first round of the Finale, the Top 8 artists performed and each coach selected one of them to advance for round two. In this round, each coach sang with her/his artist. Afterwards, the Top 2 was revealed, who, then, sang with season one winner, Helena Bianco.

Color key:

| Artist won the season |
| Artist was the runner-up |
| Artist finished in third place |
| Artist was eliminated |

| Episode | Coach | Artist | Order | Song | Order | Song with Coach | Result |
|---|---|---|---|---|---|---|---|
| Episode 5 (27 December) | Antonio Orozco | Emi Bonilla | 1 | "Trébole" | | | |
| Episode 5 (27 December) | Antonio Orozco | Nico Fioole | 2 | "You Make Me Feel So Young" | 12 | "Yesterday I Heard the Rain" | Runner-up |
| Episode 5 (27 December) | Pastora Soler | Fernando Demon | 3 | "Unchain My Heart" | 9 | "You Are So Beautiful" | Third place |
| Episode 5 (27 December) | Pastora Soler | Juana Zamora | 4 | "La gata bajo la lluvia" | | | |
| Episode 5 (27 December) | David Bustamante | Fernando Liben | 5 | "Dos gardenias" | | | |
| Episode 5 (27 December) | David Bustamante | Naida Abanovich | 6 | "Ebben? Ne Andro Lontana" | 10 | "La traviata" | Winner |
| Episode 5 (27 December) | Rosana | Los Tres Aries | 7 | "Para Toda la Vida" | | | |
| Episode 5 (27 December) | Rosana | Mingo Fernández | 8 | "For Once in My Life" | 11 | "Flor de Lis" | Third place |

Non-competition performances
| Order | Performers | Song |
|---|---|---|
| 1 | Helena Bianco with Naida Abanovich and Nico Fioole | Medley of all the songs performed in the Finale |

== Elimination chart ==
=== Color key ===
- Team Bustamante
- Team Pastora
- Team Rosana
- Team Antonio
- Winner
- Runner-up
- Third place
- Saved by her/his coach
- Eliminated
