= La Voz (Spanish TV series) season 6 =

La Voz
- Season 6
- Hosted by: Eva González; Juanra Bonet
- Judges: Pablo López; Paulina Rubio; Luis Fonsi; Antonio Orozco
- Winner: Andrés Martín
- Winning coach: Pablo López
- Runner-up: María Espinosa

Release
- Original network: Antena 3
- Original release: 7 January – 10 April 2019

Season chronology
- Next → Season 7

The sixth season of La Voz aired from 7 January 2019 to 10 April 2019 on Antena 3. Pablo López was the only coach to return from season five. He was joined by Antonio Orozco, who returned after a two-season absence, alongside new coaches Paulina Rubio and Luis Fonsi.

This was La Voz's first season on Antena 3, which acquired the rights to the format after they were dropped by Telecinco.

With Malú's departure as a coach, the sixth season was the first not to feature any of the original coaches from the show's inaugural season.

== Teams ==
- Winner
- Runner-up
- Third Place
- Fourth Place
- Artist was Eliminated in Semifinal
- Artist was Eliminated in Quarterfinal
- Artist was Eliminated in Final Battles Round
- Artist was Stolen in Knockout Round
- Artist was Eliminated in Knockouts Round

Coaches	Top 60 Artists					
Pablo López						
Pablo López	Andrés Martín	Auba Estela Murillo	Javier Erro	Palomy López	Tomás Basso	Apryl Scemama
Pablo López	Marina Damer	Andrés Iwasaki	~~Beatriz Pérez~~	~~Alvaro de Luna~~	Keila Garcia	Maria Portillo
Pablo López	Lola Jimenez	Jose Luis Cantero	Hannah Labotzka	Fran Arenas	Sandra Groove	
Paulina Rubio						
Paulina Rubio	Ángel Cortés	Viki Lafuente	Hugo Marlo	Susana Montaña	Adriana Rosa Galán	Giosy Moltino
Paulina Rubio	Ángel Mosquera & Leonardo Mera	Andrés Balado	~~Les Fourchettes~~	Aitor Martín	Onelia Leiva	Jenny Rospo
Paulina Rubio	Jesús Albarrán	Mark Wayne	Natalia Bradi	Rosco	Juanjo Garcia	
Luis Fonsi						
Luis Fonsi	María Espinosa	Linda Rodrigo	Joel Lion	Álex Palomo	Rolita	Mel Semé
Luis Fonsi	Beatriz Pérez	Álvaro de Luna	~~Marina Damer~~	~~Marcelino Damion~~	~~Tomás Basso~~	~~Ángel Mosquera & Leonardo Mera~~
Luis Fonsi	Domingo Ortiz & Roy Borland	Miriam Fernández	Gavana	Naiara Fernández	Laura González	
Antonio Orozco						
Antonio Orozco	Javi Moya	Marcelino Damion	Lorena Fernández	Lia Kali	Teresa Ferrer	Elena Vargas
Antonio Orozco	Shaddai López	Les Fourchettes	~~Adriana Rosa Galán~~	Juanfra Anguita	Sergio Jiménez	Agustín Sánchez
Antonio Orozco	Iria Regueiro	Lorena Santos	Tare Cortés	Lidia Ruiz	Mar Valdés	
Note: Italicized names are stolen artists (names struck through within former teams).

== Blind Auditions ==
The blind auditions aired from January 7, 2019. New to this season, the "Block" button. An additional three new small buttons with the name of other coaches which they can press any of those to stop another coach nabbing the contestant to its team. Each coach can block another coach 3 times for the entire season and the chair of the blocked coach won't turned around when he/she is blocked.

✔	Coach pressed "QUIERO TU VOZ" button
	Artist defaulted to a coach's team
	Artist elected a coach's team
	Artist was eliminated with no coach pressing their button
	Artist was eliminated but given a second chance to perform again
✘	Coach pressed "QUIERO TU VOZ" button but was blocked by Pablo
✘	Coach pressed "QUIERO TU VOZ" button but was blocked by Paulina
✘	Coach pressed "QUIERO TU VOZ" button but was blocked by Fonsi
✘	Coach pressed "QUIERO TU VOZ" button but was blocked by Antonio

=== Episode 1: 7 January 2019 ===
Order	Artist	Song	Coach's and contestant's choices			
Order	Artist	Song	Pablo	Paulina	Fonsi	Antonio
1	Linda Rodrigo	"Issues"	✔	✘	✔	✔
2	Palomy López	"Ángel caído"	✔	—	✔	✔
3	Juanfra Anguita	"City of Stars"	—	✔	✔	✔
4	Andrea del Solar	"I Will Always Love You"	—	—	—	—
5	Keila García	"Lost on You"	✔	✔	✔	✔
6	Rocío Rivera	"Hoy quiero confesar"	—	—	—	—
7	Simply Broke (Domingo Ortiz & Roy Borland)	"Summertime"	—	✔	✔	—

=== Episode 2: 8 January 2019 ===
Order	Artist	Song	Coach's and contestant's choices			
Order	Artist	Song	Pablo	Paulina	Fonsi	Antonio
1	Viki Lafuente	"Piece of My Heart"	—	✔	✔	—
2	Javier Erro	"A Million Dreams"	✔	—	✔	✔
3	Noelia Cano	"Cry Me Out"	—	—	—	—
4	María Portillo	"Volver"	✔	✔	✔	✘
5	Andrés Balado	"Purple Rain"	—	✔	✔	—
6	Carmen Bautista & Laura Nieves	"Contigo aprendí"	—	—	—	—
7	Lorena Fernández	"Historia de un Amor"	—	—	—	✔

=== Episode 3: 14 January 2019 ===
Order	Artist	Song	Coach's and contestant's choices			
Order	Artist	Song	Pablo	Paulina	Fonsi	Antonio
1	Beatriz Pérez	"Nada Es Para Siempre"	✔	—	✘	✔
2	Andrés Iwasaki	"Is This Love"	✔	✔	✔	✔
3	Lia Kali	"(You Make Me Feel Like) A Natural Woman"	✔	—	✔	✔
4	Carolina Gómez	"What About Us"	—	—	—	—
5	Marina Damer	"Lo saben mis zapatos"	—	—	✔	✔
6	Victoria Escudero	"I Was Born to Love You"	—	—	—	—
7	Susana Montaña	"I Surrender"	—	✔	—	—

=== Episode 4: 15 January 2019 ===
Order	Artist	Song	Coach's and contestant's choices			
Order	Artist	Song	Pablo	Paulina	Fonsi	Antonio
1	María Espinosa	"Ya lo sabes"	—	—	✔	✔
2	Hugo Marlo	"Jar of Hearts"	—	✔	—	—
3	Joel Lion	"Toxic"	✔	✔	✔	✔
4	Sergio Jiménez	"Lluvia en el cristal"	✘	—	—	✔
5	Pablo Salvatierra	"Shape of You"	—	—	—	—
6	Lola Jiménez	"Nostalgias"	✔	✔	—	✘
7	Sandra Groove	"You Shook Me All Night Long"	—	—	—	—

=== Episode 5: 21 January 2019 ===
Order	Artist	Song	Coach's and contestant's choices			
Order	Artist	Song	Pablo	Paulina	Fonsi	Antonio
1	Andrés Martín	"Dancing On My Own"	✔	—	—	✔
2	Elena Vargas	"Vida loca"	—	—	✔	✔
3	Aitor Martín	"Dark Times"	✔	✔	✔	✔
4	David Mad Mayer	"Blue Suede Shoes"	—	—	—	—
5	Agustín Sánchez	"La quiero a morir"	✘	✔	✔	✔
6	Noelia García	"Ain't No Mountain High Enough"	—	—	—	—
7	Mel Semé	"Iron Sky"	✔	✔	✔	✘

=== Episode 6: 22 January 2019 ===
Order	Artist	Song	Coach's and contestant's choices			
Order	Artist	Song	Pablo	Paulina	Fonsi	Antonio
1	Miriam Fernández	"Con las ganas"	✔	—	✔	✔
2	Les Fourchettes	"And So It Goes"	—	✔	✔	—
3	José Luis Cantero	"Se supone"	✔	—	—	—
4	Germán Jauregui	"Location"	—	—	—	—
5	Onelia Leiva	"The Edge of Glory"	—	✔	✔	✔
6	Selina del Río	"El río"	—	—	—	—
7	Iria Regueiro	"God Is a Woman"	—	✔	—	✔
8	Daniel García	"Here I Go Again"	—	—	—	—

=== Episode 7: 28 January 2019 ===
Order	Artist	Song	Coach's and contestant's choices			
Order	Artist	Song	Pablo	Paulina	Fonsi	Antonio
1	Auba Estela Murillo	"Con las ganas"	✔	—	✔	✘
2	David Lozano	"When We Were Young"	—	—	—	—
3	Lorena Santos	"No Me Doy por Vencido"	✔	—	✔	✔
4	Jenny Rospo	"Total Eclipse of the Heart"	—	✔	—	—
5	Jennyfer Seco	"Skin"	—	—	—	—
6	Alex Palomo	"Lonely Boy"	—	—	✔	—
7	Marta "La Niña"	"Nana del caballo grande"	—	—	—	—
8	Rolita	"I Say a Little Prayer"	—	✔	✔	—

=== Episode 8: 29 January 2019 ===
Order	Artist	Song	Coach's and contestant's choices			
Order	Artist	Song	Pablo	Paulina	Fonsi	Antonio
1	Adriana Rosa Galán	"Is This Love"	—	✔	—	✔
2	Javi Moya	"Contigo"	✔	—	✔	✔
3	José Álvarez	"Venezia sin ti"	—	—	—	—
4	Apryl Scemama	"Comme d'habitude"	✔	—	—	✔
5	María Cortés	"Si a veces hablo de ti"	—	—	—	—
6	Marcelino Damion	"Jealous"	—	—	✔	✔
7	Guadalupe Jiménez	"Si no vivo contigo"	—	—	—	—
8	Ángel Cortés	"Una furtiva lágrima"	—	✔	—	—

=== Episode 9: 4 February 2019 ===
Order	Artist	Song	Coach's and contestant's choices			
Order	Artist	Song	Pablo	Paulina	Fonsi	Antonio
1	Gavana	"Born This Way"	—	✔	✔	✔
2	Taré Cortés	"Vida loca"	—	✔	✔	✔
3	Edu Sánchez	"Ruido"	—	—	—	—
4	Hannah Labotzka	"Make You Feel My Love"	✔	—	—	✔
5	Vanessa Black	"Set Fire to the Rain"	—	—	—	—
6	Giosy Moltino	"(I Can't Get No) Satisfaction"	—	✔	—	—
7	Sam Darris	"You'll Be in My Heart"	—	—	—	—
8	Jesús Albarrán	"Mr. Tambourine Man"	—	✔	—	—

=== Episode 10: 5 February 2019 ===
Order	Artist	Song	Coach's and contestant's choices			
Order	Artist	Song	Pablo	Paulina	Fonsi	Antonio
1	Álvaro de Luna	"La flaca"	✔	✔	✔	✔
2	Naiara Fernández	"Will You Love Me Tomorrow"	—	—	✔	✔
3	Noa Perseidas	"Georgia on My Mind"	—	—	—	—
4	Teresa Ferrer	"Defying Gravity"	—	—	—	✔
5	Eva Izquierdo	"The High Road"	—	—	—	—
6	Mark Wayne	"Let's Stay Together"	—	✔	—	—
7	Rosa Marín	"Lo siento, mi amor"	—	—	—	—
8	Lidia Ruiz	"Boig per tu"	—	—	—	✔

=== Episode 11: 11 February 2019 ===
Order	Artist	Song	Coach's and contestant's choices			
Order	Artist	Song	Pablo	Paulina	Fonsi	Antonio
1	Fran Arenas	"Siendo uno mismo"	✔	—	—	✔
2	Cayetana Díaz	"Quizás, Quizás, Quizás"	—	—	—	—
3	Laura González	"Whole Lotta Love"	—	—	✔	—
4	Natalia Bradi	"Like I'm Gonna Lose You"	—	✔	—	—
5	Kiko Peña	"Lágrimas negras"	—	—	—	—
6	Sandra Groove	"Love on the Brain"	✔	✔	—	✘
7	María Reig	"You and I"	Team full	—	—	—
8	Tomás Basso	"Eu Sei que Vou Te Amar"	Team full	✘	✔	✔

=== Episode 12: 12 February 2019 ===
Order	Artist	Song	Coach's and contestant's choices			
Order	Artist	Song	Pablo	Paulina	Fonsi	Antonio
1	Rosco	"Come Together"	Team full	✔	—	—
2	Miriam Reyes	"Memory"	Team full	—	—	—
3	Ángel Mosquera & Leonardo Mera	"Toxic"	Team full	✔	✔	✔
4	Francis Soul Jr.	"The Way You Look Tonight"	Team full	—	Team full	—
5	Shaddai López	"Stone Cold"	Team full	✔	Team full	✔
6	Juanjo García	"Y ahora"	Team full	✔	Team full	✘
7	Mar Valdés	"It's a Man's Man's Man's World"	Team full	Team full	Team full	✔

== Knockouts ==
Knockout rounds began on 18 February. Each team is divided into five and every artist will performing a song of their choice. Two of five contestant is chosen to advance into the Battle Round while the remaining unchosen will have a chance to be stolen by another coaches. Each coach is given two " Steals" to save losing artist.

=== Episode 13: 18 February 2019 ===
Order	Coach	Contestant	Song	Result
1	Luis Fonsi	Linda Rodrigo	"Warrior"	Advanced
2	Luis Fonsi	Ángel Mosquera & Leonardo Mera	"Billionaire"	Stolen by Paulina
3	Luis Fonsi	María Espinosa	"Corazón hambriento"	Advanced
4	Luis Fonsi	Marcelino Damion	"So Sick"	Stolen by Antonio
5	Luis Fonsi	Marina Damer	"Prometo"	Stolen by Pablo
6	Pablo López	Javier Erro	"Hábito de ti"	Advanced
7	Pablo López	Beatriz Pérez	"All I Ask"	Stolen by Fonsi
8	Pablo López	María Portillo	"Puede ser"	Eliminated
9	Pablo López	José Luis Cantero	"Héroe"	Eliminated
10	Pablo López	Apryl Scemama	"Toi et moi"	Advanced

=== Episode 14: 19 February 2019 ===
Order	Coach	Contestant	Song	Result
1	Paulina Rubio	Andrés Balado	"Heaven"	Advanced
2	Paulina Rubio	Giosy Moltino	"Another One Bites the Dust"	Advanced
3	Paulina Rubio	Juanjo García	"Desde Cuándo"	Eliminated
4	Paulina Rubio	Natalia Bradi	"Creep"	Eliminated
5	Paulina Rubio	Les Fourchettes	"When I Fall in Love"	Stolen by Antonio
6	Antonio Orozco	Teresa Ferrer	"Think"	Advanced
7	Antonio Orozco	Juanfra Anguita	"Story of My Life"	Eliminated
8	Antonio Orozco	Taré Cortés	"Amiga Mía"	Eliminated
9	Antonio Orozco	Lorena Fernández	"Hoy Tengo Ganas de Ti"	Advanced
10	Antonio Orozco	Iria Regueiro	"Impossible"	Eliminated

=== Episode 15: 25 February 2019 ===
Order	Coach	Contestant	Song	Result
1	Antonio Orozco	Lia Kali	"I Just Want To Make Love To You"	Advanced
2	Antonio Orozco	Sergio Jiménez	"Vi"	Eliminated
3	Antonio Orozco	Mar Valdés	"I'd Rather Go Blind"	Eliminated
4	Antonio Orozco	Lorena Santos	"Miedo"	Eliminated
5	Antonio Orozco	Javi Moya	"Mi marciana"	Advanced
6	Luis Fonsi	Joel Lion	"Fix You"	Advanced
7	Luis Fonsi	Rolita	"At Last"	Advanced
8	Luis Fonsi	Laura Gonzalez	"Nothing Else Matters"	Eliminated
9	Luis Fonsi	Tomàs Basso	"Corcovado"	Stolen by Pablo
10	Luis Fonsi	Gavana	"Fever"	Eliminated

=== Episode 16: 26 February 2019 ===
Order	Coach	Contestant	Song	Result
1	Pablo López	Andrés Martín	"Wake Me Up"	Advanced
2	Pablo López	Palomy	"Durmiendo sola"	Advanced
3	Pablo López	Sandra Groove	"Radioactive"	Eliminated
4	Pablo López	Álvaro de Luna	"Estrella Polar"	Stolen by Fonsi
5	Pablo López	Keila García	"Lucha de Gigantes"	Eliminated
6	Paulina Rubio	Marlo	"The A Team"	Advanced
7	Paulina Rubio	Aitor Martín	"Cómo Mirate"	Eliminated
8	Paulina Rubio	Onelia Leiva	"Milion Reasons"	Eliminated
9	Paulina Rubio	Jesús Albarrán	"Kansas City"	Eliminated
10	Paulina Rubio	Viki Lafuente	"Son Of A Preacher Man"	Advanced

=== Episode 17: 4 March 2019 ===
Order	Coach	Contestant	Song	Result
1	Pablo López	Auba Estela Murillo	"Aunque tú no lo sepas"	Advanced
2	Pablo López	Fran Arenas	"Esmi Soledaz"	Eliminated
3	Pablo López	Lola Jiménez	"The House Of the Rising Sun"	Eliminated
4	Pablo López	Hannah Labotka	"When We Were Young"	Eliminated
5	Pablo López	Andrés Iwasaki	"Ojalá	Advanced
6	Paulina Rubio	Ángel Cortés	"Toma a surriento"	Advanced
7	Paulina Rubio	Susana Montaña	"Almost Is Never Enough"	Advanced
8	Paulina Rubio	Jenny Rospo	"Don't Speak"	Eliminated
9	Paulina Rubio	Mark Wayne	"I've Been Loving You Too Long"	Eliminated
10	Paulina Rubio	Rosco	"Crazy Little Thing Called Love"	Eliminated

=== Episode 18: 5 March 2019 ===
Order	Coach	Contestant	Song	Result
1	Luis Fonsi	Miriam Fernández	"Sin miedo a nada"	Eliminated
2	Luis Fonsi	Mel Semé	"Three Little Birds"	Advanced
3	Luis Fonsi	Domingo Oritz & Roy Borland	"Stand By Me"	Eliminated
4	Luis Fonsi	Naiara Fernández	"She Wolf"	Eliminated
5	Luis Fonsi	Alex Palomo	"Tuyo"	Advanced
6	Antonio Orozco	Elena Vargas	"Dígale"	Advanced
7	Antonio Orozco	Adriana Rosa Galán	"Chain Of Fools"	Stolen by Paulina
8	Antonio Orozco	Agustín Sánchez	"Tu refugio"	Eliminated
9	Antonio Orozco	Lidia Ruiz	"Time After Time"	Eliminated
10	Antonio Orozco	Shaddai López	"Feeling Good"	Advanced

== « Batalla Final » (Final Battle) ==
=== Episode 19: 11 March 2019 ===
Order	Coach	Winner	Song	Loser
1	Paulina Rubio	Ángel Cortés	"You Are So Beautiful"	Andrés Balado
2	Pablo López	Andrés Martín	"All I Want"	Andrés Iwasaki
3	Luis Fonsi	Linda Rodrigo	"The Way You Make Me Feel"	Beatriz Perez
4	Antonio Orozco	Javi Moya	"Soldadito marinero"	Shaddai López
5	Pablo López	Palomy López	"Peces de ciudad"	Marina Damer
6	Paulina Rubio	Hugo Marlo	"Writing's on the Wall"	Ángel Mosquera & Leonardo Mera
7	Luis Fonsi	María Espinosa	"La habitación"	Álvaro de Luna
8	Antonio Orozco	Lia Kali	"Flames"	Les Fourchettes

=== Episode 20: 12 March 2019 ===
Order	Coach	Winner	Song	Loser
1	Luis Fonsi	Joel Lion	"Havana"	Mel Semé
2	Pablo López	Javier Erro	"Another Love"	Apryl Scemama
3	Antonio Orozco	Lorena Fernández	"A que no me dejas"	Elena Vargas
4	Paulina Rubio	Viki Lafuente	"The Show Must Go On"	Giosy Moltino
5	Pablo López	Auba Estela Murillo	"Si Tú No Vuelves"	Tomás Basso
6	Luis Fonsi	Álex Palomo	"Maggie May"	Rolita
7	Antonio Orozco	Marcelino Damion	"Sign of the Times"	Teresa Ferrer
8	Paulina Rubio	Susana Montaña	"I'll Stand by You"	Adriana Rosa Galán

== « Directos » (Live Shows) ==
Advanced
Eliminated

=== Episode 21: 20 March 2019 ===
- Group performances:
  - Pablo López, Palomy López & Auba Estela Murillo - "Y sin embargo"
  - Luis Fonsi, Linda Rodrigo & Álex Palomo - "Échame la Culpa"
  - Antonio Orozco, Lia Kali & Javi Moya - "Temblando"
  - Paulina Rubio, Viki Lafuente & Susana Montaña - "Yo No Soy Esa Mujer"

Order	Coach	Contestant	Song	Coach Score	Audience Score	Final score
1	Pablo López	Palomy López	"La fuerza del corazón"	40	21	61
2	Pablo López	Auba Estela Murillo	"Prometo"	60	79	139
3	Luis Fonsi	Álex Palomo	"The Scientist"	40	53	93
4	Luis Fonsi	Linda Rodrigo	"Rise Up"	60	47	107
5	Antonio Orozco	Lia Kali	"Roxanne"	40	13	53
6	Antonio Orozco	Javi Moya	"Si tú no estás aquí"	60	87	147
7	Paulina Rubio	Susana Montaña	"Bohemian Rhapsody"	40	33	73
8	Paulina Rubio	Viki Lafuente	"Livin' on a Prayer"	60	67	127

=== Episode 22: 27 March 2019 ===
- Group performances:
  - Luis Fonsi, Joel Lion & María Espinosa - "Quisiera poder olvidarme de ti"
  - Pablo López, Andrés Martín & Javier Erro - "Lo saben mis zapatos"
  - Paulina Rubio, Hugo Marlo & Ángel Cortés - "Ni una Sola Palabra"
  - Antonio Orozco, Lorena Fernández & Marcelino Damion - "Por pedir, pedí"

Order	Coach	Contestant	Song	Coach Score	Audience Score	Final score
1	Luis Fonsi	Joel Lion	"Uptown Funk"	40	43	83
2	Luis Fonsi	María Espinosa	"Me cuesta tanto olvidarte"	60	57	117
3	Pablo López	Andrés Martín	"Hallelujah"	60	63	123
4	Pablo López	Javier Erro	"California Dreamin'"	40	37	77
5	Paulina Rubio	Ángel Cortés	"'O sole mio"	40	82	122
6	Paulina Rubio	Hugo Marlo	"I Don't Want to Miss a Thing"	60	18	78
7	Antonio Orozco	Lorena Fernández	"Solamente Tú"	40	38	78
8	Antonio Orozco	Marcelino Damion	"Killing Me Softly"	60	62	122

=== Episode 23: 3 April 2019 ===
- Group performances:
  - Paulina Rubio, Viki Lafuente & Ángel Cortés - "Mi Nuevo Vicio"
  - Antonio Orozco, Javi Moya & Marcelino Damion - "Mi héroe"
  - Pablo López, Andrés Martín & Auba Estela Murillo - "El patio"
  - Luis Fonsi, Linda Rodrigo & María Espinosa - "Aquí Estoy Yo"

Order	Coach	Contestant	Song	Coach Score	Audience Score	Final score
1	Paulina Rubio	Viki Lafuente	"Something's Got a Hold on Me"	60	29	89
2	Paulina Rubio	Ángel Cortés	"Amapola"	40	71	111
3	Antonio Orozco	Javi Moya	"Dónde está el Amor"	60	68	128
4	Antonio Orozco	Marcelino Damion	"Earned It"	40	32	72
5	Pablo López	Andrés Martín	"Can't Help Falling in Love"	60	67	127
6	Pablo López	Auba Estela Murillo	"Love of My Life"	40	33	73
7	Luis Fonsi	Linda Rodrigo	"Flashlight"	40	22	62
8	Luis Fonsi	María Espinosa	"Uno x uno"	60	78	138

=== Episode 24: 10 April 2019 ===
Order	Coach	Contestant	Solo Performance	Duet with Guest	Duet with Adviser	Outcome
1	Paulina Rubio	Ángel Cortés	"Unchained Melody"	"Besos a la lona" (with Melendi)	"A dónde vas" (with Antonio José)	4th place
2	Antonio Orozco	Javi Moya	"El Sitio de Mi Recreo"	"Déjame ser" (with Manuel Carrasco)	"Dicen" (with Karol G)	3rd place
3	Pablo López	Andrés Martín	"When a Man Loves a Woman"	"Un año" (with Sebastián Yatra)	"Mejor sin miedo" (with Miriam Rodríguez)	Winner
4	Luis Fonsi	María Espinosa	"Amiga Mía"	"Mi Persona Favorita" (with Alejandro Sanz)	"Héroes" (with David Bustamante)	Runner-up

== Elimination chart ==
=== Overall ===
Color key
Artist's info

- Team Pablo
- Team Paulina
- Team Fonsi
- Team Antonio

Result details

- Winner
- Runner-up
- Third place
- Fourth place
- Saved by the public
- Eliminated

Live Shows Results per week
Artists	Week 1	Week 2	Week 3	Week 4 Finale
Andrés Martín		Safe	Safe	Winner
María Espinosa		Safe	Safe	Runner-up
Javi Moya	Safe		Safe	3rd Place
Ángel Cortés		Safe	Safe	4th Place
Viki Lafuente	Safe		Eliminated	Eliminated (week 3)
Marcelino Damion		Safe	Eliminated	Eliminated (week 3)
Auba Estela Murillo	Safe		Eliminated	Eliminated (week 3)
Linda Rodrigo	Safe		Eliminated	Eliminated (week 3)
Joel Lion		Eliminated	Eliminated (week 2)	
Hugo Marlo		Eliminated	Eliminated (week 2)	
Javier Erro		Eliminated	Eliminated (week 2)	
Lorena Fernández		Eliminated	Eliminated (week 2)	
Palomy López	Eliminated	Eliminated (week 1)		
Álex Palomo	Eliminated	Eliminated (week 1)		
Lia Kali	Eliminated	Eliminated (week 1)		
Susana Montaña	Eliminated	Eliminated (week 1)		
