= La Voz Senior (Spanish TV series) season 3 =

La Voz Senior
- Season 3
- Hosted by: Eva González
- Coaches: David Bustamante; Niña Pastori; José Mercé; Antonio Orozco
- Winner: Gwen Perry
- Winning coach: David Bustamante
- Runner-up: José Hervin

Release
- Original network: Antena 3
- Original release: January 8 – January 29, 2022

Season chronology
- ← Previous; Season 2

The third and final season of La Voz Senior began airing on January 8, 2022 on Antena 3. Antonio Orozco and David Bustamante return as coaches from the previous season. Niña Pastori and José Mercé were announced as new coaches, replacing Pastora Soler, and Rosana Arbelo. Eva González remains as the host of the program.

Gwen Perry won the season, marking David Bustamante's second and final win as a coach. With Bustamante's win, he became the only coach so far in all Spanish version of La Voz to win consecutive seasons.

== Coaches ==
It was announced that Antonio Orozco and David Bustamante are the returning coaches from the previous season of the show. Meanwhile, they are joined by newcomers Niña Pastori and last season's guest coach, José Mercé.

La Voz Senior season 3 coaches

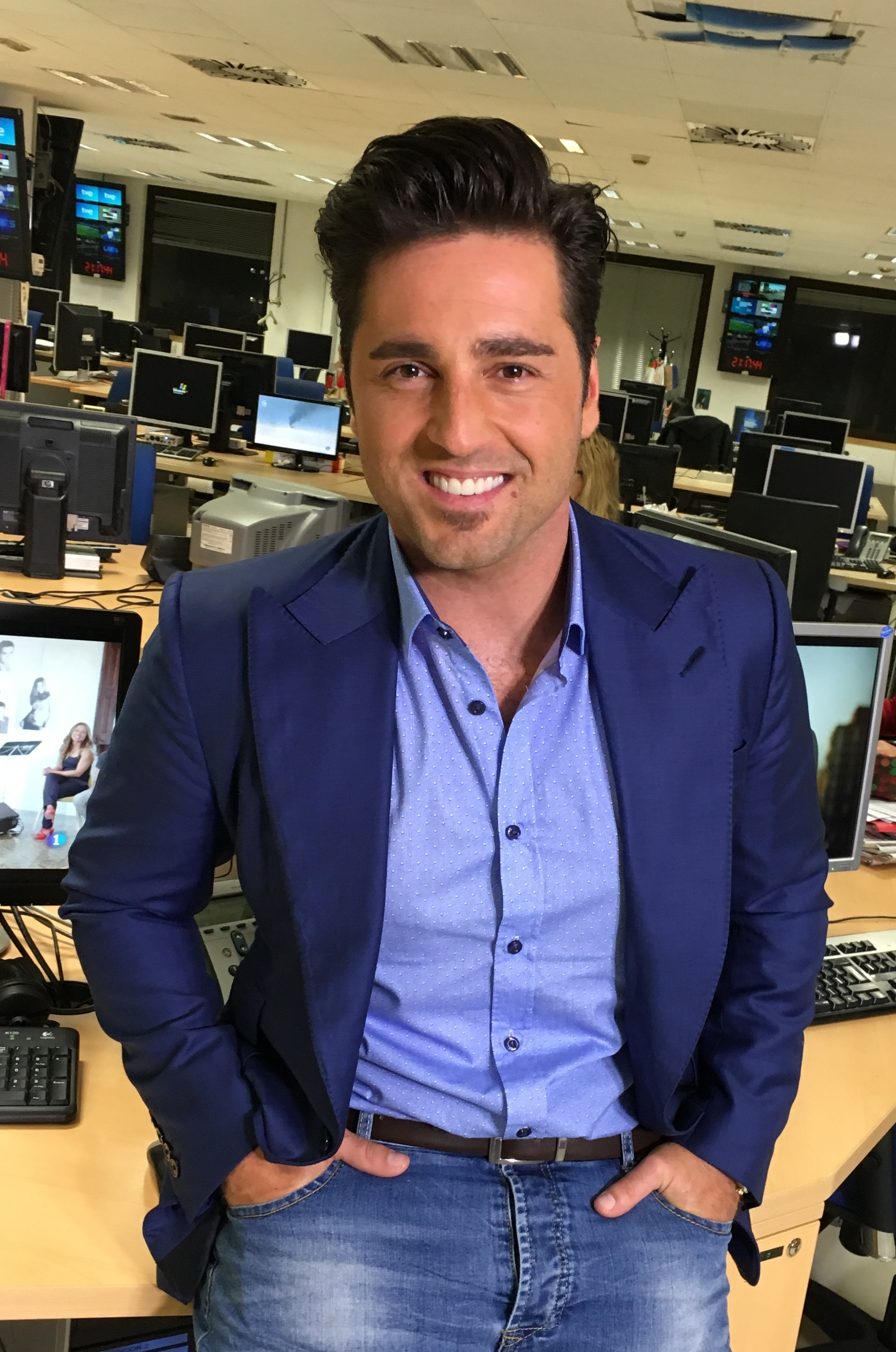
David Bustamante

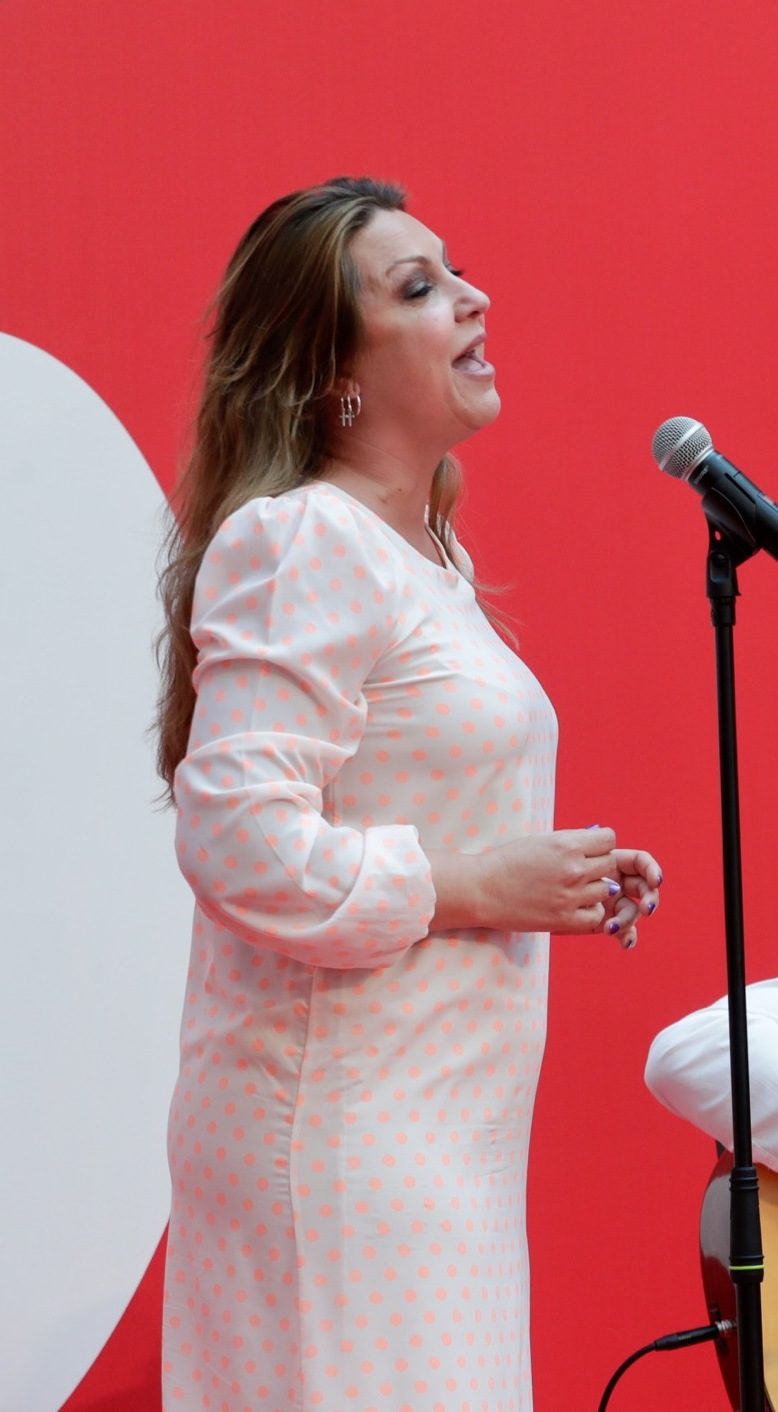
Niña Pastori

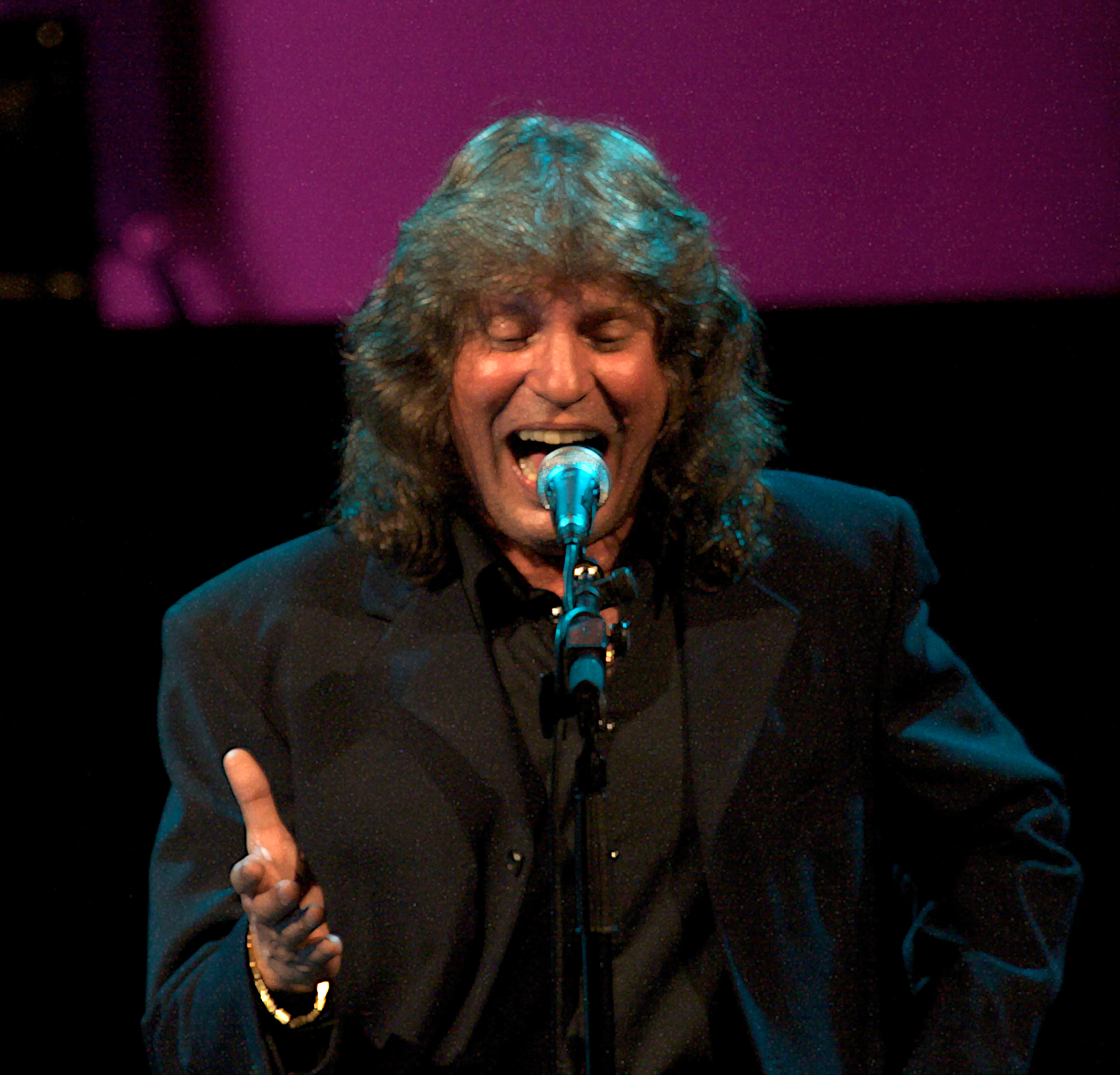
José Mercé

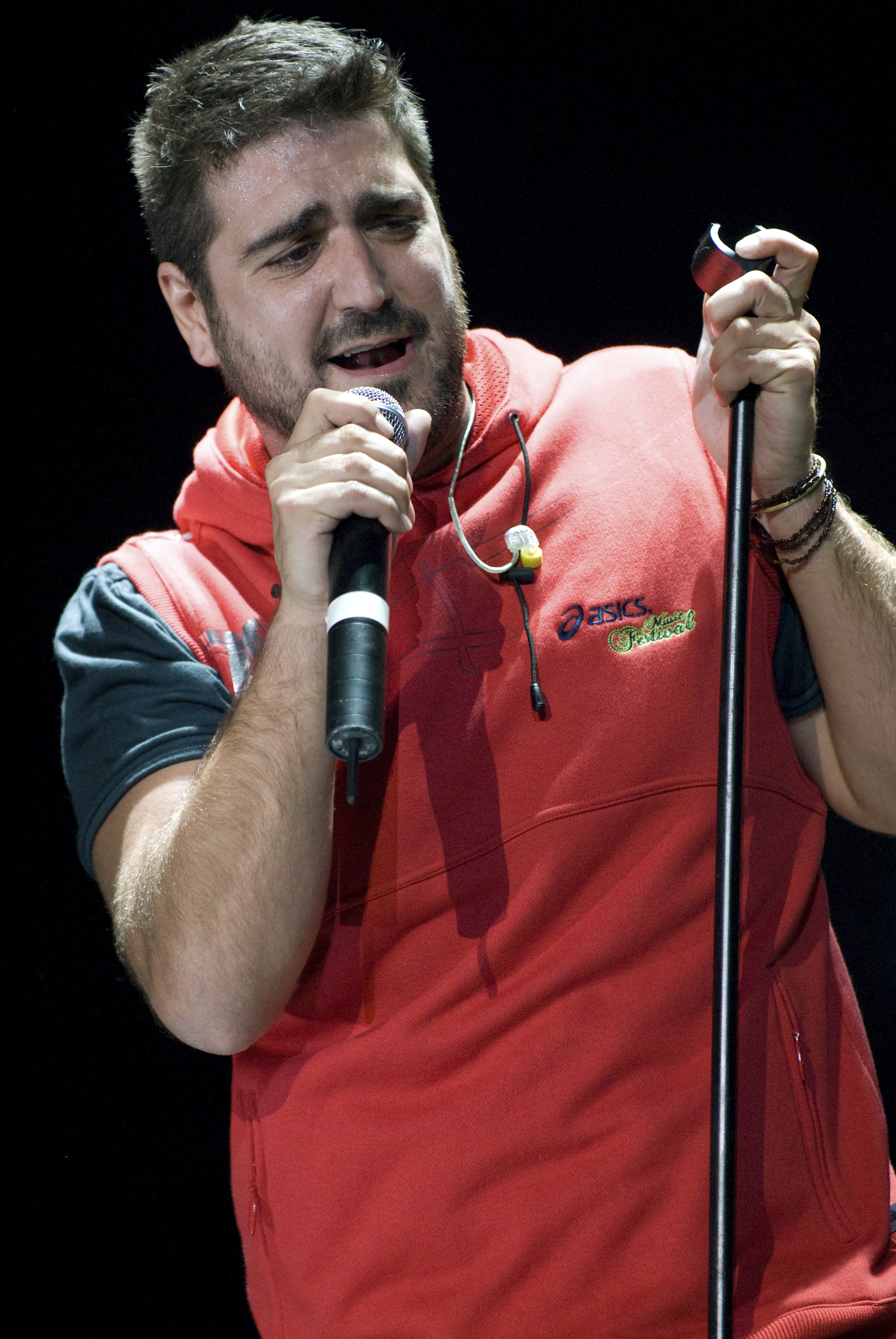
Antonio Orozco

== Teams ==
- Winner
- Runner-up
- Third place
- Fourth place
- Eliminated in the Finale
- Eliminated in the Knockouts

Coaches	Top 20 artists				
David Bustamante	Gwen Perry	Herminia Ruiz	Lina Vargas	Gregorio López	Julia Murillo
Niña Pastori	John Romero	Montse Creus	Trío Medianoche	Esperanza Alarcón	Carmen Cuartero
José Mercé	Lluis Navarro	Carlitos de Bornos	Gloria Fernández	Luis Escudero	Franki Med
Antonio Orozco	José Hervin	Aztlán	Peret Reyes	Pilar Matías	Elisa Burgos

== Blind Auditions ==
Blind auditions color key
✔	Coach pressed "QUIERO TU VOZ" button
	Artist defaulted to a coach's team
	Artist elected this coach's team
	Artist eliminated as no coach pressing their button
✘	Coach pressed "I WANT YOU" button, but was blocked by another coach from getting the artist
	Blocked by Bustamante; Blocked by Pastori; Blocked by Mercé; Blocked by Antonio

=== Episode 1 (8 January 2022) ===
Episode one results
Order	Artist	Age	Song	Coaches' and artists' choices			
Order	Artist	Age	Song	Bustamante	Pastori	Mercé	Antonio
1	Peret Reyes	68	"Bienvenidos" (Original)	–	–	✘	✔
2	Gloria Fernández	78	"Romance de Zamarrilla"	✔	–	✔	–
3	Lina Vargas	67	"A Mi Manera"	✔	–	–	✘
4	Los Rogelios	64 & 95	"Tres Piedras Negras" (Los Montejo)	–	–	–	–
5	Pilarín de España	65	"Cómo Han Pasado los Años"	✔	✔	✔	✔
6	Montse Creus	60	"Je Ne Regrette Rien"	✘	✔	✔	–
7	Luis Arconada	78	"Toreador"	–	–	–	–
8	John Romero	67	"Kiss"	✔	✔	✔	✘
9	Gregorio López	74	"Mi Buenos Aires querido"	✔	–	–	–
10	Cecilia Bellorin	65	"As Time Goes By"	–	–	–	–
11	Luis Escudero	65	"Háblame del Mar Marinero"	–	–	✔	–
12	Gwen Perry	75	"When I Fall In Love"	✔	–	–	–
13	Carmen Logan	65	"Frim Fram Sauce"	–	–	–	–
14	El Trío Medianoche (Pedro, Jesús and Bernardo)		"La Hiedra"	–	✔	–	–

=== Episode 2 (15 January 2022) ===
Episode one results
Order	Artist	Age	Song	Coaches' and artists' choices			
Order	Artist	Age	Song	Bustamante	Pastori	Mercé	Antonio
1	Julia Murillo	63	"Se acabó"	✔	–	–	–
2	Franky Med	62	"Perfect"	–	–	✔	–
3	Eulogio Prats	66	"Bad moon rising"	–	–	–	–
4	Herminia Ruiz	60	"Mon coeur s'ouvre à ta voix"	✔	–	–	–
5	Carlitos de Bornos	69	"La rosa llora su pena"	Team full	–	✔	–
6	Pepi Díaz	65	"Viva el pasodoble"	Team full	–	–	–
7	Elisa Burgos	62	"Para toda la vida"	Team full	–	✔	✔
8	Carmen Carreter	63	"Smoke on the water"	Team full	–	–	–
9	Lluis Navarro	67	"Sweet home Chicago"	Team full	✔	✔	✔
10	Esperanza Alarcón	61	"Eres tú"	Team full	✔	Team full	–
11	Aztlán	63 & 61	"La media vuelta"	Team full	–	Team full	✔
12	Rachel	72	"Piensa en mi"	Team full	–	Team full	–
13	José Hervin	64	"Parlami d'amore Mariù"	Team full	✔	Team full	✔
14	Carmen Cuarteto	60	"Amor eterno"	Team full	✔	Team full	Team full

== The Knockouts ==
In the Knockouts, also labeled as "The Semifinal", each coach had all their artists compete in a knockout. At the end of all performances, the audience voted for one artist per team to advance, while each coach chose a second artist, both advancing into the Finale. Coaches received help from their advisors: Shaila Dúrcal for Team Bustamante, Kiki Morente for Team Pastori, Omar Montes for Team Mercé, and Tomatito for Team Antonio.

Knockouts color key
Artist received audience's vote to win the Knockout and advanced to the Finale
Artist received coach's vote to win the Knockout and advanced to the Finale
Artist lost the Knockout and was eliminated

Knockouts results
Episode	Coach	Order	Artist	Song	Result
Episode 3 (22 January)	David Bustamante	1	Julia Murillo	"Vámonos"	Eliminated
Episode 3 (22 January)	David Bustamante	2	Gregorio López	"Caminito"	Eliminated
Episode 3 (22 January)	David Bustamante	3	Gwen Perry	"My endless love"	Coach's choice
Episode 3 (22 January)	David Bustamante	4	Lina Vargas	"Con los años que me quedan"	Eliminated
Episode 3 (22 January)	David Bustamante	5	Herminia Ruiz	"Nella Fantasia"	Audience's vote
Episode 3 (22 January)	José Mercé	6	Gloria Fernández	"Volviendo a España"	Eliminated
Episode 3 (22 January)	José Mercé	7	Lluis Navarro	"Johnny B. Goode"	Audience's vote
Episode 3 (22 January)	José Mercé	8	Luis Escudero	"La morena de mi copla"	Eliminated
Episode 3 (22 January)	José Mercé	9	Franki Med	"The Joker"	Eliminated
Episode 3 (22 January)	José Mercé	10	Carlitos de Bornos	"Llorando me la encontré"	Coach's choice
Episode 3 (22 January)	Antonio Orozco	11	Peret Reyes	"Una lágrima cayo en la arena"	Eliminated
Episode 3 (22 January)	Antonio Orozco	12	Elisa Burgos	"Desde mi libertad"	Eliminated
Episode 3 (22 January)	Antonio Orozco	13	Aztlán	"Lo dudo"	Coach's choice
Episode 3 (22 January)	Antonio Orozco	14	Pilar Matías	"Paloma Brava"	Eliminated
Episode 3 (22 January)	Antonio Orozco	15	José Hervin	"Júrame"	Audience's vote
Episode 3 (22 January)	Niña Pastori	16	John Romero	"Hey Jude"	Coach's choice
Episode 3 (22 January)	Niña Pastori	17	Carmen Cuartero	"Sombras nada más"	Eliminated
Episode 3 (22 January)	Niña Pastori	18	Montse Creus	"Woman in love"	Audience's vote
Episode 3 (22 January)	Niña Pastori	19	Esperanza Alarcón	"El hombre del piano"	Eliminated
Episode 3 (22 January)	Niña Pastori	20	Trío Medianoche	"Perdida"	Eliminated

== Elimination chart ==
=== Color key ===
- Team Bustamante
- Team Pastori
- Team Mercé
- Team Antonio
- Winner
- Runner-up
- Third place
- Fourth place
- Eliminated

=== Table ===
Full results by team
Artist	Knockouts	Finale	
Artist	Knockouts	Round 1	Round 2
Gwen Perry	Coach's choice	Coach's choice	Winner
Herminia Ruiz	Public's vote	Eliminated	
Julia Murillo	Eliminated		
Gregorio López	Eliminated		
Lina Vargas	Eliminated		
John Romero	Coach's choice	Coach's choice	Third place
Montse Creus	Public's vote	Eliminated	
Carmen Cuartero	Eliminated		
Esperanza Alarcón	Eliminated		
Trío Medianoche	Eliminated		
Lluis Navarro	Public's vote	Coach's choice	Fourth place
Carlitos de Bornos	Coach's choice	Eliminated	
Gloria Fernández	Eliminated		
Luis Escudero	Eliminated		
Franki Med	Eliminated		
José Hervin	Public's vote	Coach's choice	Second place
Aztlán	Coach's choice	Eliminated	
Peret Reyes	Eliminated		
Elisa Burgos	Eliminated		
Pilar Matías	Eliminated		
