= La Voz Senior (Spanish TV series) season 1 =

La Voz Senior
- Season 1
- Hosted by: Eva González
- Coaches: David Bisbal; Paulina Rubio; Pablo López; Antonio Orozco
- Winner: Helena Bianco
- Winning coach: Pablo López
- Runner-up: Juan Mena

Release
- Original network: Antena 3
- Original release: May 8 – June 26, 2019

Season chronology
- Next → Season 2

La Voz Senior (season 1) is a Spanish reality talent show that premiered on 8 May 2019 on Antena 3. Based on the reality singing competition The Voice Senior, the series was created by Dutch television producer John de Mol. It is part of an international series.

This was La Voz Senior's first season on Antena 3, after La Voz and La Voz Kids. The coaching panel includes David Bisbal, Paulina Rubio, Pablo López, Antonio Orozco; all of whom have served as coaches on the adult version.

Helena Bianco won the season, marking Pablo Lopez's first and only win as a coach.

== Teams ==
- Winner
- Runner-up
- Third Place
- Fourth Place
- Artist was Eliminated in Semifinal
- Artist was Eliminated in Knockouts Round

Coaches	Top 20 artists				
David Bisbal					
David Bisbal	Ignacio Encinas	Blanca Villa	Javier Gallego	Fernado Cejalvo	Ramon Luis Guillem
Paulina Rubio					
Paulina Rubio	Xavi Garriga	Adriana Ceballos	Charles Garfield	Frank Mer	Ricardo Rubén Araya
Pablo López					
Pablo López	Helena Bianco	Enriqueta Cabellero	David Jarque	José Mª Guzmán	Giuseppe Izzllio
Antonio Orozco					
Antonio Orozco	Juan Mena	Marcelo Gómez	La Tata	Loli Moreno	Los D'Orlando

== « Audiciones a ciegas » (Blind Auditions) ==
The blind auditions aired from May 8 to May 29, 2019. Coaches had to fill their teams with 5 artists each.

Coach hit his or her "QUIERO TU VOZ" button
Contestant eliminated with no coach pressing his or her "QUIERO TU VOZ" button
Contestant defaulted to this coach's team
Contestant elected to join this coach's team

=== Episode 1 (8 May 2019) ===
Order	Contestant	Song	Coaches and contestants' choices			
Order	Contestant	Song	David	Paulina	Pablo	Antonio
1	Rosario "La Tata"	"La Bohème"				
2	Germa Del Barrio	"Nostalgia"	—	—	—	—
3	Javier Gallego	"Nessun dorma"			—	
4	José Mª Guzmán	Señora azul	—	—		
5	Carmen Blanco	"Lazaro canta El ultimo trago"	—	—	—	—
6	Ramon Luis Guillem	A ti, mujer		—	—	—
7	The Peter Twins (Anne & Annis)	"Rivers of Babylon"	—	—	—	—
8	Adriana Ceballos	"Somebody Else's Guy"			—	—

=== Episode 2 (15 May 2019) ===
Order	Contestant	Song	Coaches and contestants' choices			
Order	Contestant	Song	David	Paulina	Pablo	Antonio
1	Marcelo Gómez	"Unchain My Heart"				
2	Maruja Garrido	"El Bardo"	—	—	—	—
3	Giuseppe Izzllio	"Volare"	—	—		
4	Gonzalo Fernández	"Quién Piensa En Ti"	—	—	—	—
5	Charles Garfield	"Purple Rain"	—		—	—
6	Maisa Hens	"You've Got A Friend"	—	—	—	—
7	Blanca Villa	"Se Nos Rompió El Amor"		—	—	—
8	Agustín Aguiló	"You Are The Sunshine Of My Life"	—	—	—	—

=== Episode 3 (22 May 2019) ===
Order	Contestant	Song	Coaches and contestants' choices			
Order	Contestant	Song	David	Paulina	Pablo	Antonio
1	Fernado Cejalvo	"Maitechu Mía"				
2	Nicolás Fioole	"It's Not Inusual"	—	—	—	—
3	Mª José Rodríguez Villalón	"El Relicario"	—	—	—	—
4	David Jarque	"I've Got You Under My Skin"	—	—		
5	Alicia Olivera	"Santa Lucia"	—	—	—	—
6	Ignacio Encinas	"Torna Sorriento"			—	
7	Enriqueta Cabellero	"Amar Pelos Dois"	Team full	—		
8	Frank Mer	"It's A Heartache"	Team full			

=== Episode 4 (29 May 2019) ===
Order	Contestant	Song	Coaches and contestants' choices			
Order	Contestant	Song	David	Paulina	Pablo	Antonio
1	Juan Mena	"Comó fue"	Team full			
2	Loli Moreno	"Payaso"	Team full			
3	Ricardo Rubén Araya	"Caruso"	Team full		—	—
4	Xavi Garriga	"Sweet Home Chicago"	Team full		—	—
5	Andrea Bronston	"Runaway"	Team full	Team full	—	—
6	Helena Bianco	"Una Estrella En Mi Jardín"	Team full	Team full		—
7	Betty Singh	"Se Me Olvidó Otra Vez"	Team full	Team full	Team full	—
8	Los D'Orlando (Silvo Alfonso, Orlando Alonso and Julio González)	"Lágrimas Negras"	Team full	Team full	Team full	

== « Asaltos » (Knockouts) ==
=== Episode 5 (5 June 2019) ===
Order	Coach	Contestant	Song	Result
1	David Bisbal	Fernado Cejalvo	Maite	Eliminated
2	David Bisbal	Blanca Villa	Como Una Ola	Advanced
3	David Bisbal	Javier Gallego	Amapola	Eliminated
4	David Bisbal	Ramon Luis Guillem	Júramé	Eliminated
5	David Bisbal	Ignacio Encinas	E lucevan le stelle	Advanced
6	Pablo López	Helena Bianco	Ayúdalá	Advanced
7	Pablo López	Giuseppe Izzllio	IL mondo	Eliminated
8	Pablo López	Enriqueta Cabellero	What a Wonderful World	Advanced
9	Pablo López	David Jarque	Quando, quando, quando	Eliminated
10	Pablo López	José Mª Guzmán	Solo Pienso en Ti	Eliminated

=== Episode 6: (12 June 2019) ===
Order	Coach	Contestant	Song	Result
1	Antonio Orozco	La Tata	"Si a veces hablo de ti"	Eliminated
2	Antonio Orozco	Juan Mena	"Envidia"	Advanced
3	Antonio Orozco	Loli Moreno	"Échame a mi la culpa"	Eliminated
4	Antonio Orozco	Marcelo Gómez	"Knock on Wood"	Advanced
5	Antonio Orozco	Los D'Orlando	"La negra Tomasa"	Eliminated
6	Paulina Rubio	Ricardo Rubén Araya	América	Eliminated
7	Paulina Rubio	Adriana Ceballos	What's up	Advanced
8	Paulina Rubio	Frank Mer	Sorry Seems to Be the Hardest Word	Eliminated
9	Paulina Rubio	Charles Garfield	Sexual Healing	Eliminated
10	Paulina Rubio	Xabi Garriga	Just a Gigolo	Advanced

== « Directos » (Live Shows) ==
Finalist
Eliminated

=== Semi-final ===
Order	Coach	Contestant	Song	Result
1	Antonio Orozco	Juan Mena	"Tengo una debilidad"	Finalist
2	Antonio Orozco	Marcelo Gómez	"Land of 1000 dances"	Eliminated
3	Pablo López	Helena Bianco	"Te extraño"	Finalist
4	Pablo López	Enriqueta Cabellero	"Un ramito de violetas"	Eliminated
5	David Bisbal	Blanca Villa	"Lucía"	Eliminated
6	David Bisbal	Ignacio Encinas	"Mattinata"	Finalist
7	Paulina Rubio	Xavi Garriga	"Stand By Me"	Finalist
8	Paulina Rubio	Adriana Ceballos	"Stop!"	Eliminated

=== Finale ===
Order	Coach	Contestant	Solo Performance	Duet with Coach	Finish
1	Paulina Rubio	Xavi Garriga	"New York, New York"	"Lo Haré Por Ti"	Fourth place
2	Antonio Orozco	Juan Mena	"Toda una vida"	"Devuélveme La Vida"	Runner-up
3	Pablo López	Helena Bianco	"A Mi Manera"	"El Camino"	Winner
4	David Bisbal	Ignacio Encinas	"Vesti La Giubba"	"El Ruido"	Third place

Color key

- Team David
- Team Paulina
- Team Pablo
- Team Antonio

- Winner
- Runner-up
- Third place
- Fourth place
- Finalist
- Eliminated
