= La Voz Senior (Spanish TV series) =

Spanish reality talent show

- Genre: Reality television
- Created by: John de Mol Jr. Roel van Velzen
- Presented by: Eva Gonzalez
- Judges: David Bisbal; Paulina Rubio; Pablo López; Antonio Orozco; David Bustamante; Pastora Soler; Rosana Arbelo; Niña Pastori; José Mercé
- Country of origin: Spain
- Original language: Spanish
- No. of seasons: 3
- No. of episodes: 17

Production
- Production locations: Atresmedia Studios; Madrid, Spain
- Running time: 150 minutes
- Production companies: Talpa (2019); Atresmedia; Boomerang TV; ITV Studios (2020–2022)

Original release
- Network: Antena 3
- Release: 8 May 2019 – 29 January 2022

Related
- La Voz; La Voz Kids

La Voz Senior (Spanish for The Voice Senior) is a Spanish reality talent show that premiered on 8 May 2019 on Antena 3. It is part of the international syndication The Voice based on the original Dutch television program The Voice of Holland, created by Dutch television producer John de Mol Jr. When Atresmedia announced the acquisition of the format in June 2018, they announced they would produce La Voz Senior, where elders over 60 will compete against each other.

== Format ==
The show consists of three phases: a blind audition, a battle phase, and the live performance shows. Four judges also known as coaches, all noteworthy recording artists, choose teams of contestants through a blind audition process. Each judge has the length of the auditioner's performance (about one minute) to decide if he or she wants that performer on his or her team; if two or more judges want the same performer (as happens frequently), the performer has the final choice of which coach's team to join.

After the coaches fill each respective slots in their team the batch of singers in the team is mentored and developed by its respective coach. In the second stage, called the knockout phase, coaches have all of their team members perform a song in the stage that look like a battle ring, with the coach choosing which team member to advance from each of individual "battles" into the semi-finals.

Within the semi-final, the surviving eight acts from each team again compete head-to-head, with the coach determining one of two acts from their team that will advance to the final four.

In the final phase, the remaining four acts perform for the last time head-to-head, with one senior crowned La Voz Senior.

== Coaches and hosts ==
=== Coaches ===
On 14 November 2018, David Bisbal was announced as the first coach for La Voz Senior. Two days later Antena 3 confirmed the coaching panel for the senior version would be Bisbal, Pablo López, Antonio Orozco and Paulina Rubio. The series premiered on May 8, 2019. On 15 October 2019, Pastora Soler and Rosana Arbelo were announced as new coaches for the series' second season. A day later, it was announced that Orozco would return to the panel along with a third new coach, David Bustamante. Season three saw Bustamante and Orozco return as panelists, joined by Niña Pastori and José Mercé who both debuted as coaches.

=== Coaches' timeline ===
Seasons
Coach	1	2	3
David Bisbal			
Paulina Rubio			
Pablo López			
Antonio Orozco			
David Bustamante			
Pastora Soler			
Rosana Arbelo			
Niña Pastori			
José Mercé			

=== Line-up of coaches ===
Coaches' line-up by chairs order
Season	Year	Coaches			
Season	Year	1	2	3	4
1	2019	David	Paulina	Pablo	Antonio
2	2020	Bustamante	Pastora	Rosana	Antonio
3	2022	Bustamante	Pastori	Mercé	Antonio

Coaches gallery

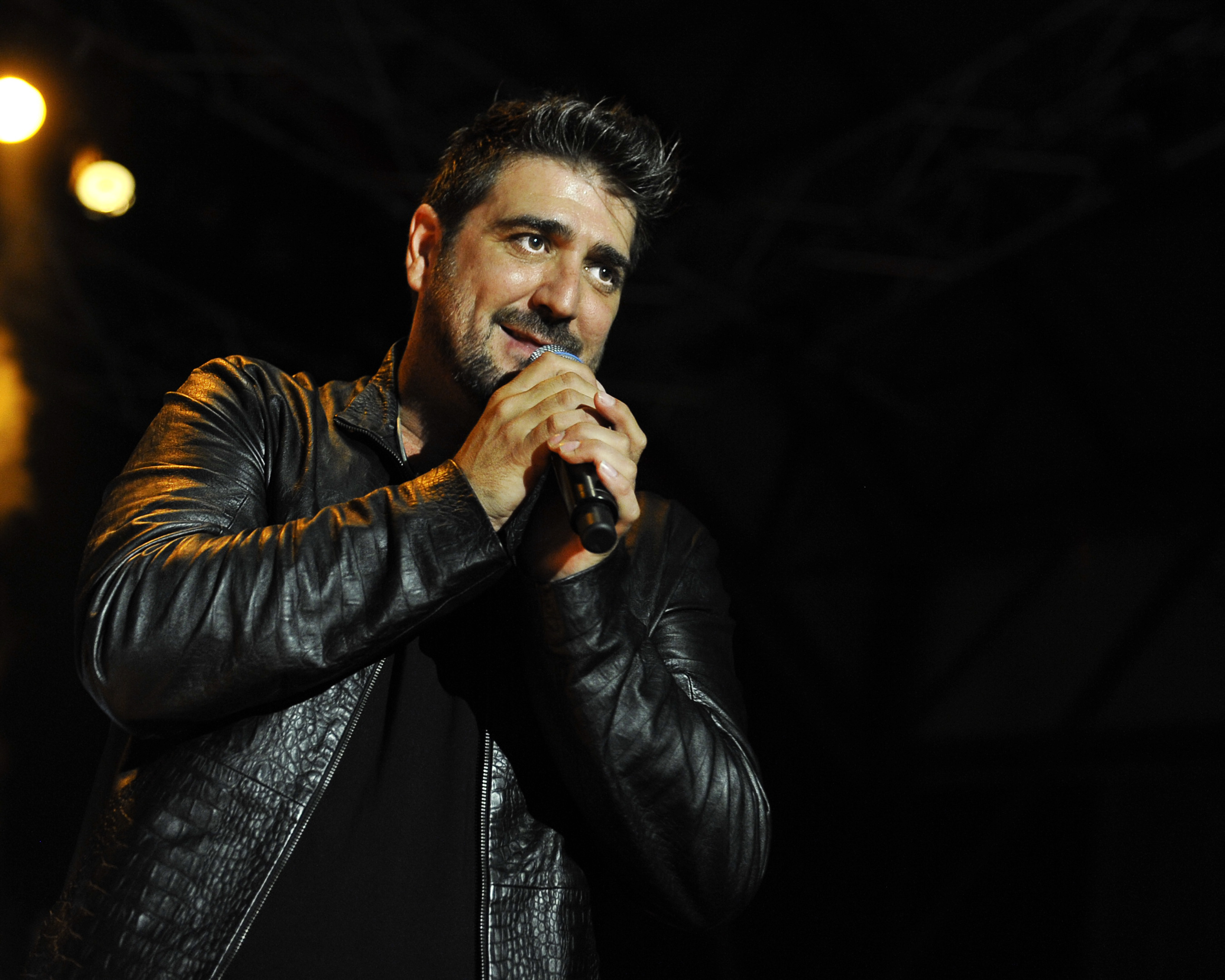
Antonio Orozco (2019–2022)

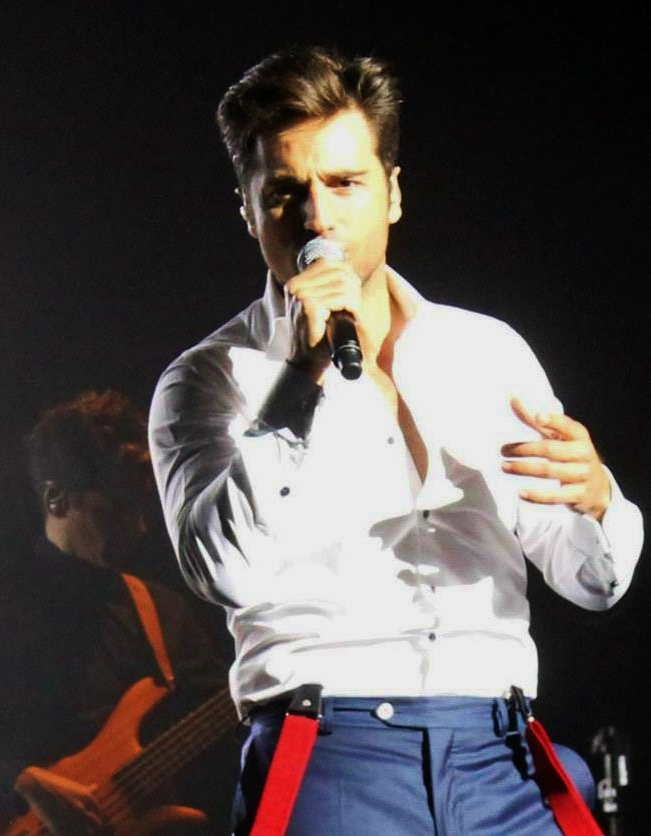
David Bustamante (2020–2022)

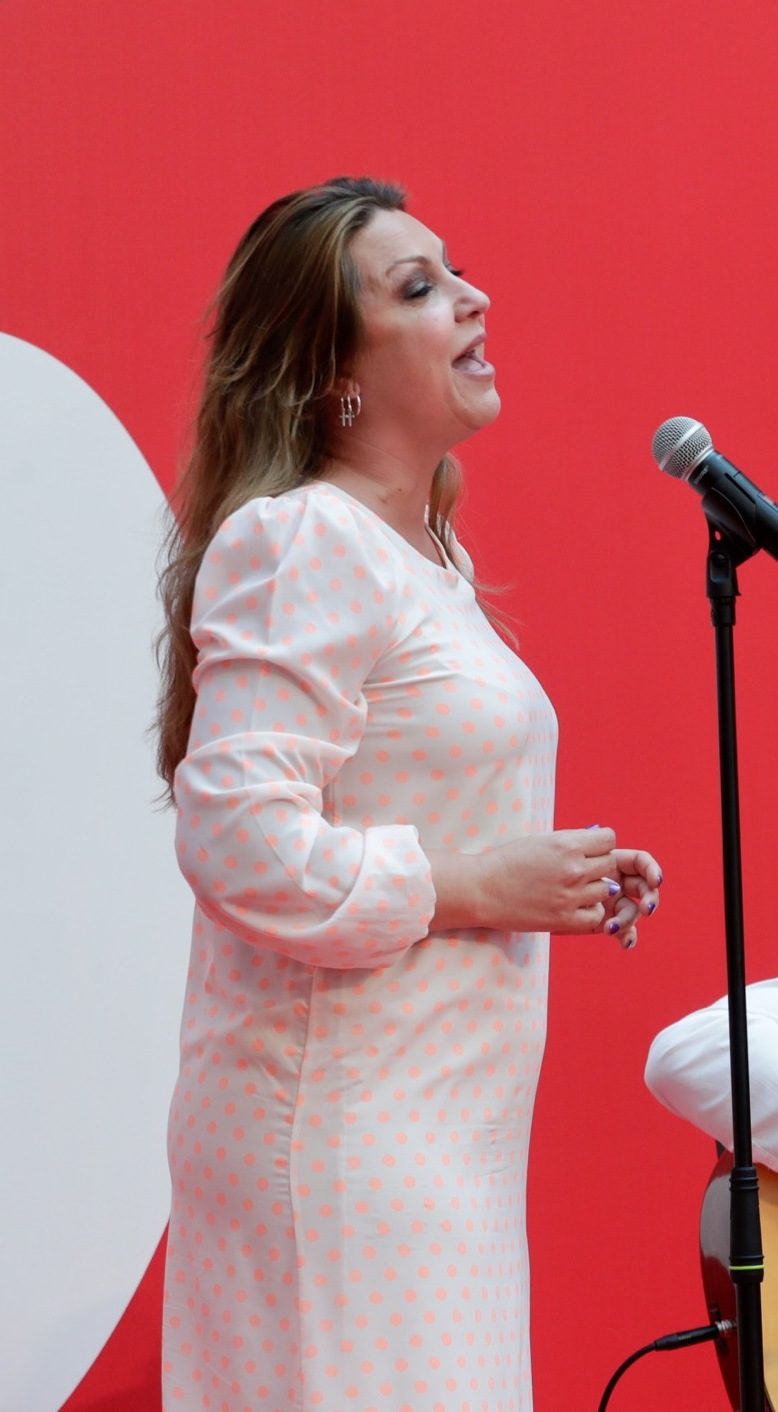
Niña Pastori (2022)

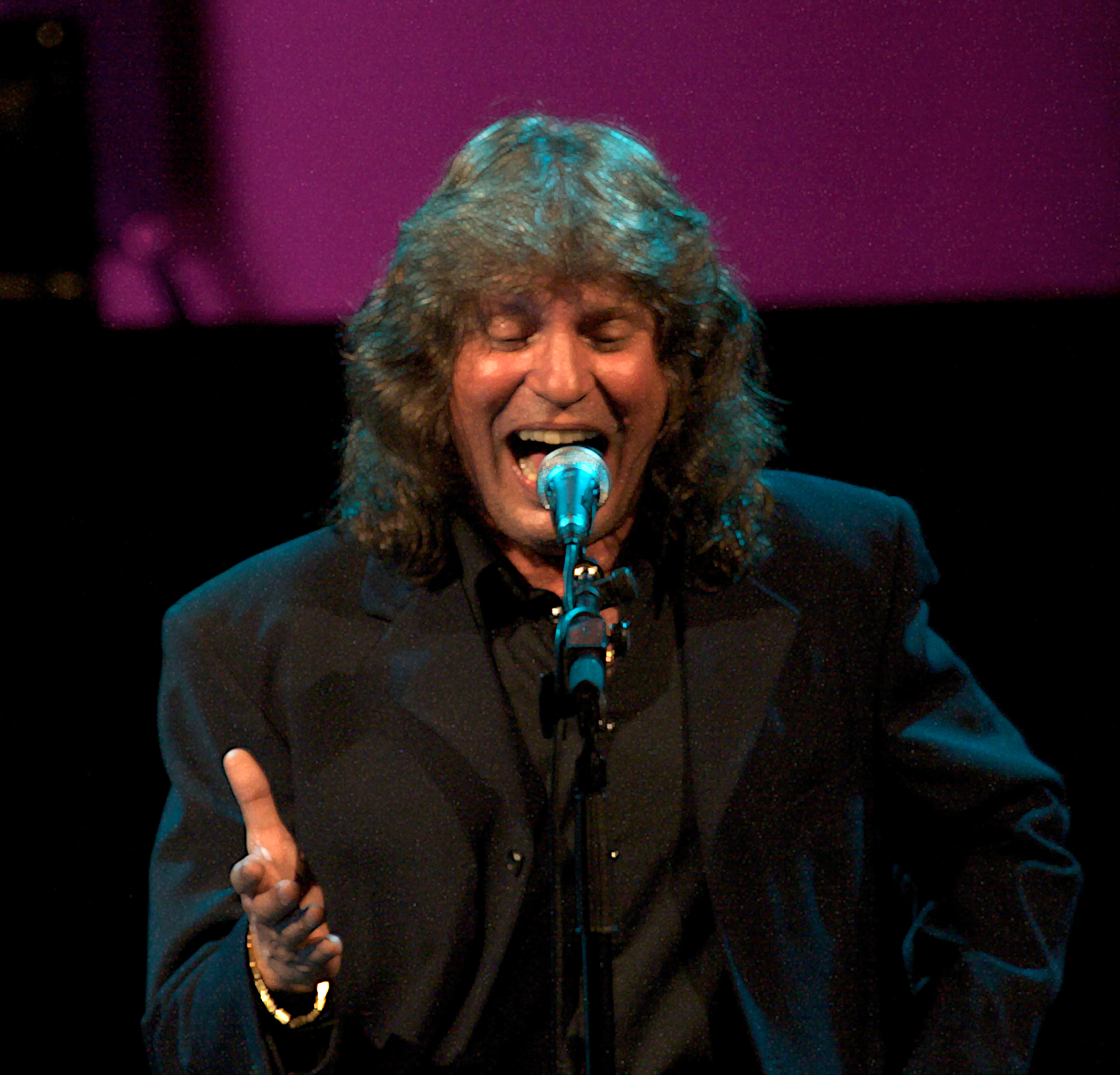
José Mercé (2022)

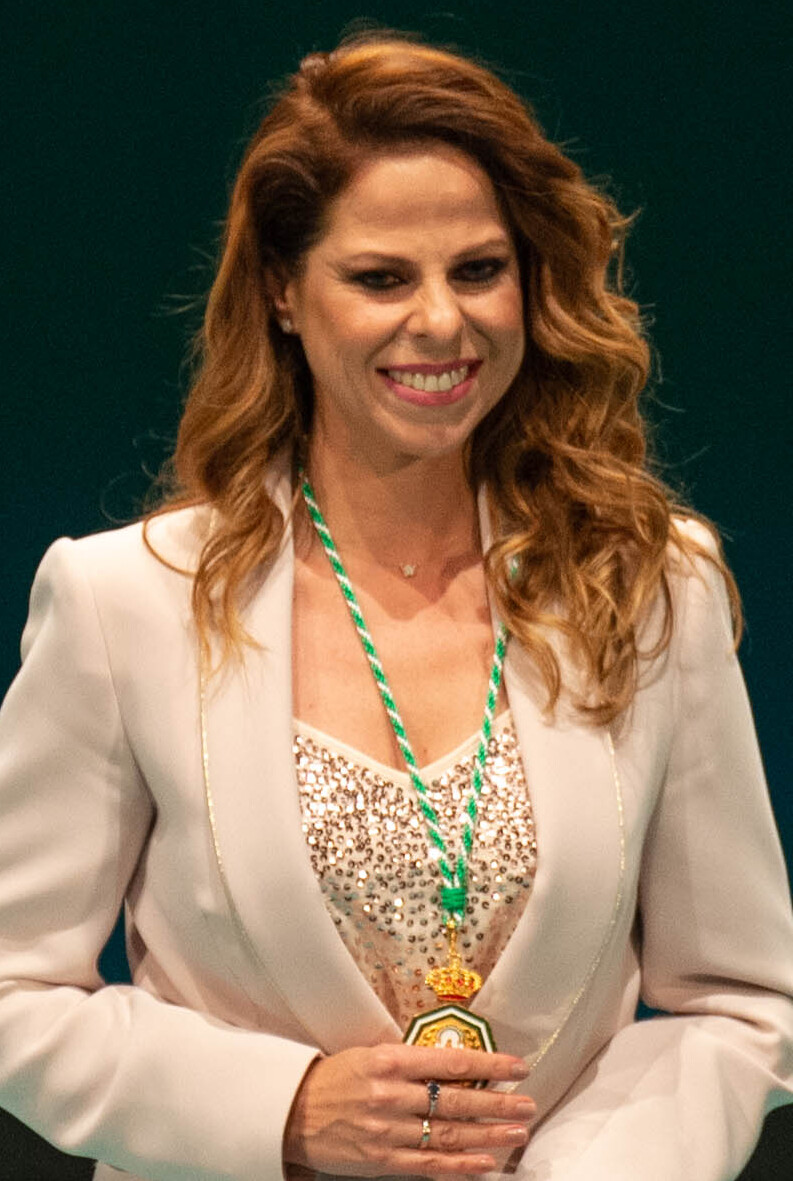
Pastora Soler (2020)

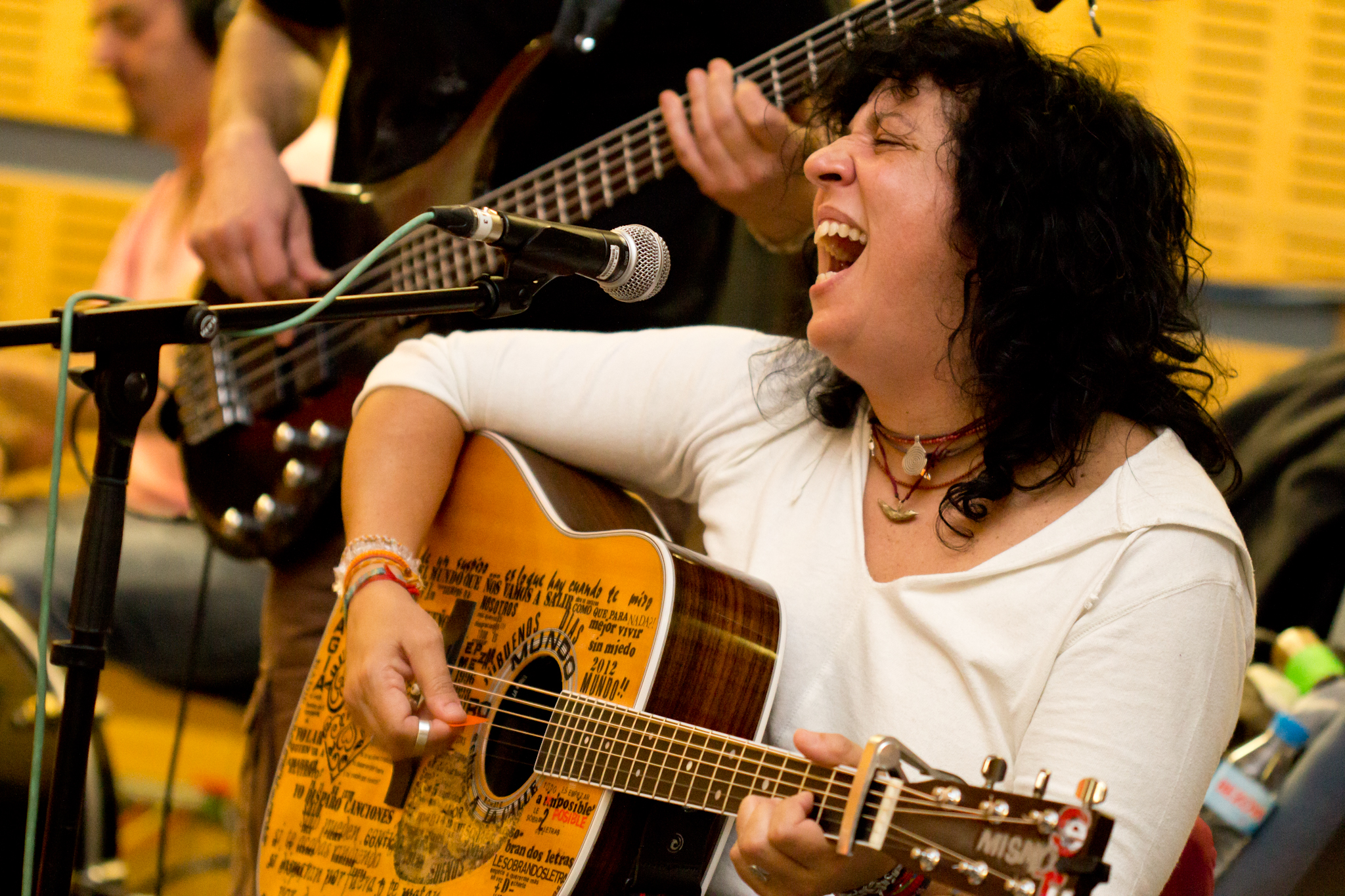
Rosana Arbelo (2020)

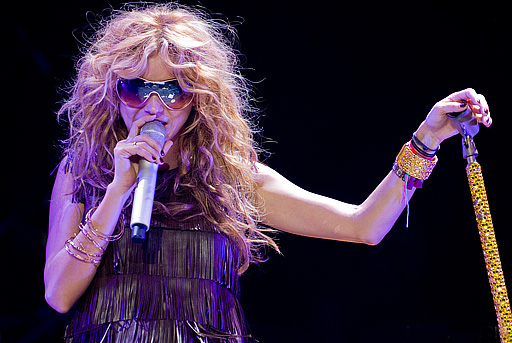
Paulina Rubio (2019)

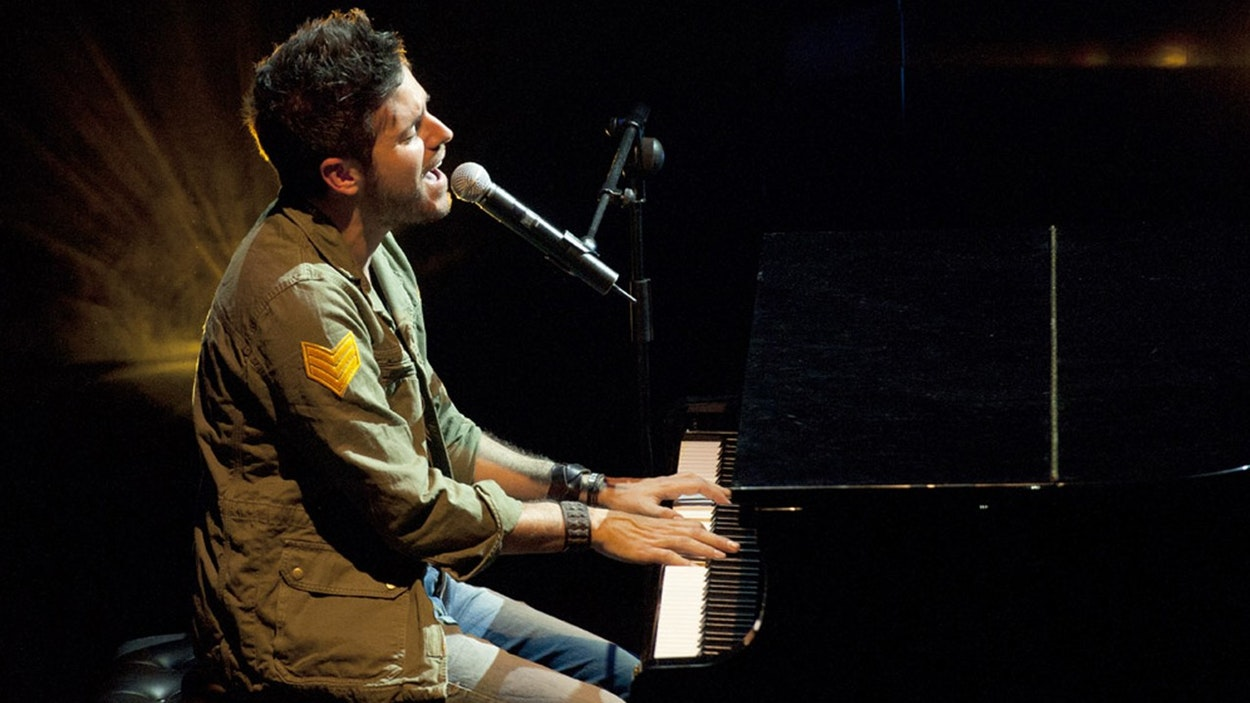
Pablo López (2019)

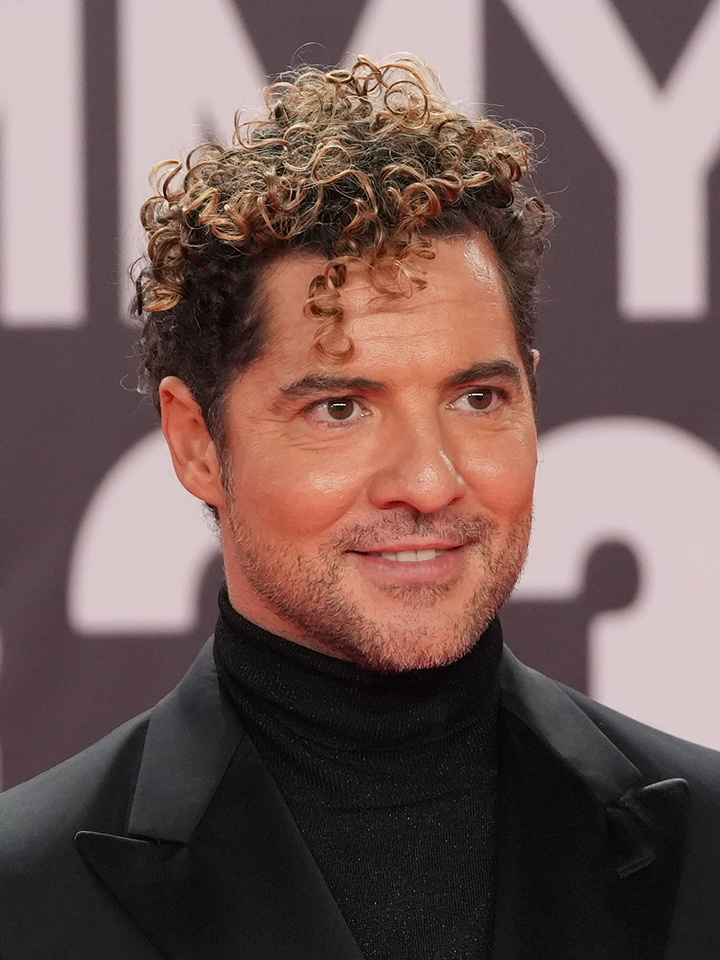
David Bisbal (2019)

=== Presenter timeline ===
Host	Seasons		
Host	1	2	3
Eva González			

== Series overview ==
Warning: the following table presents a significant amount of different colors.

Teams colour key
Artist from Team Pablo	Artist from Team Paulina	Artist from Team Rosana
Artist from Team Antonio	Artist from Team Bustamante	Artist from Team Pastori
Artist from Team David	Artist from Team Pastora	Artist from Team José

Spanish La Voz Senior series overview
Season	Aired	Winner	Runner-up	Third Place	Fourth Place	Winning coach	Presenter
1	2019	Helena Bianco	Juan Mena	Ignacio Encinas	Xavi Garriga	Pablo López	Eva González
2	2020	Naida Abanovich	Nico Fioole	Fernando Demon	Mingo Fernández	David Bustamante	Eva González
3	2022	Gwen Perry	José Hervin	John Romero	Lluis Navarro	David Bustamante	Eva González

== Coaches' teams ==
=== Season 1: 2019 ===
Season One premiered on Antena 3 on 8 May and lasted until 26 June 2019.

Each coach was allowed to advance two artists to the live shows:

Team David	Team Paulina	Team Pablo	Team Antonio
Ignacio Encinas	Xavi Garriga	Helena Bianco	Juan Mena
Blanca Villa	Adriana Ceballos	Enriqueta Cabellero	Marcelo Gómez

=== Season 2: 2020 ===
The second season premiered on Antena 3 on 10 December and ended on 27 December 2020.

Team Bustamante	Team Pastora	Team Rosana	Team Antonio
Naida Abanovich	Fernando Demon	Mingo Fernández	Nico Fioole
Fernando Liben	Joana Zamora	Los Tres Aries	Emi Bonilla

=== Season 3: 2022 ===
The third season premiered on Antena 3 on 8 January, and concluded on 29 January 2022.

Team Bustamante	Team Pastori	Team Mercé	Team Antonio
Gwen Perry	John Romero	Lluis Navarro	José Hervin
Herminia Ruiz	Montse Creus	Carlitos de Bornos	Aztlán
