= David Bustamante =

Spanish singer-songwriter (born 1982)

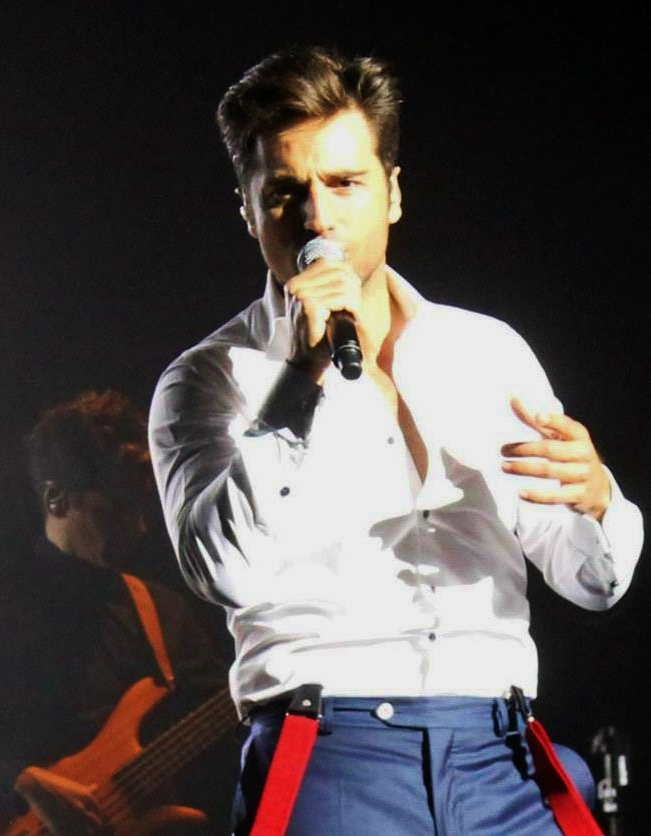
- Bustamante in 2015
- Born: David Bustamante Hoyos; 25 March 1982 (age 44); San Vicente de la Barquera (Cantabria), Spain
- Occupations: Singer; songwriter; Television presenter
- Years active: 2001–present
- Spouse: Paula Echevarría (m. 2006; div. 2018)
- Children: 1
- Musical career
- Genres: Latin ballad; Latin pop; pop
- Instrument: Vocals
- Label: Vale Music (2001–2010); Universal Music Group (2006–present)
- Website: www.bustamanteoficial.com

David Bustamante Hoyos (born 25 March 1982) is a Spanish pop singer and songwriter. He gained his initial fame in 2001–02 when he placed third in season 1 of Operación Triunfo. He has sold more than two million records—albums and singles combined—in Spain and Latin America, getting fifteen Platinum in albums, digital downloads, and mobile ringtones. By 2026, nine of his eleven albums have reached number one in Spain.

According to a survey conducted by the agency Personality Media in 2016, he was recognized by 96% of the Spanish population. In other ventures, he has released thirteen fragrances with Puig.

== Biography ==
=== 2001–2003: Operación Triunfo and Bustamante ===
David Bustamante's breakthrough was in season 1 of Operación Triunfo in 2001–02. This talent show broke ratings records on La Primera of Televisión Española (TVE) as well as dominated the top position of the CD sales charts during its five-month run. Bustamante was in his late teens when he placed third in the competition. He went on to sign with Vale Music and Universal Music Latino. Having finished third, he competed with the top two, Rosa López and David Bisbal, with three original songs each, to represent Spain at the Eurovision Song Contest 2002, something that Rosa ultimately won with "Europe's Living a Celebration". Bustamante and Bisbal, along with three other female Operación Triunfo contestants, were Rosa's backing vocalists at Eurovision.

His debut album, Bustamante, was released in Spain in May 2002 and in Latin America and the United States in 2003. The album became a big seller, thanks in part to the singles "Además de ti", "El aire que me das", and "Dos hombres y un destino". Another highlight of that album was "Perdóname", a duet with Puerto Rican pop star Luis Fonsi. He followed the promotion with a successful summer tour with over seventy concerts throughout Spain.

=== 2004–2005: Así soy yo and Caricias al alma ===
In 2004, Bustamante followed up his first album with his sophomore outing, Así soy yo, which was – for the most part – produced by Emilio Estefan in Miami. It was also in 2004 that he recorded the theme song of Gitanas, a telenovela that was filmed in Mexico and ran on Telemundo in the United States.

He continued with Caricias al alma in 2005. The album was another success in Spain and other countries of Latin America like Venezuela, where it was certificated Gold. Caricias al alma was recorded in Italy and Spain and included the summer hit "Devuélveme la vida". Furthermore, he visited Latin America to promote his music.

=== 2006–2010: Pentimento, Al filo de la irrealidad, and A contracorriente ===
Bustamante's success continued with Pentimento (2006), Al Filo de la Irrealidad (2008), and A Contracorriente (2010) all reaching the top of the Spanish Album chart and going Platinum. With all this albums, he has promoted his music throughout Spain, Latin America, and some European countries. He had success with some singles like "Cobarde", "Por ella" or "A contracorriente". During this time, he made several spring, summer, and winter tours.

=== 2011–2015: Mio and Vivir ===
2011's Mio, produced by Christian Leuzzi and Mauri Stern reached Platinum status and helped the singer's total sales figures approach the two million mark. Mio includes a duet with Pastora Soler. In 2012 and 2013 he toured Spain and served as a coach in season 1 and season 2 of El Número Uno on Antena 3.

In 2014, he released the studio album Vivir. The first single is the hit "Feliz". During the Christmas break, he presented Fuera de clase on TVE. The network also aired a music special gala dedicated to his career on Christmas Eve.

=== 2016–2017: Amor de los dos ===
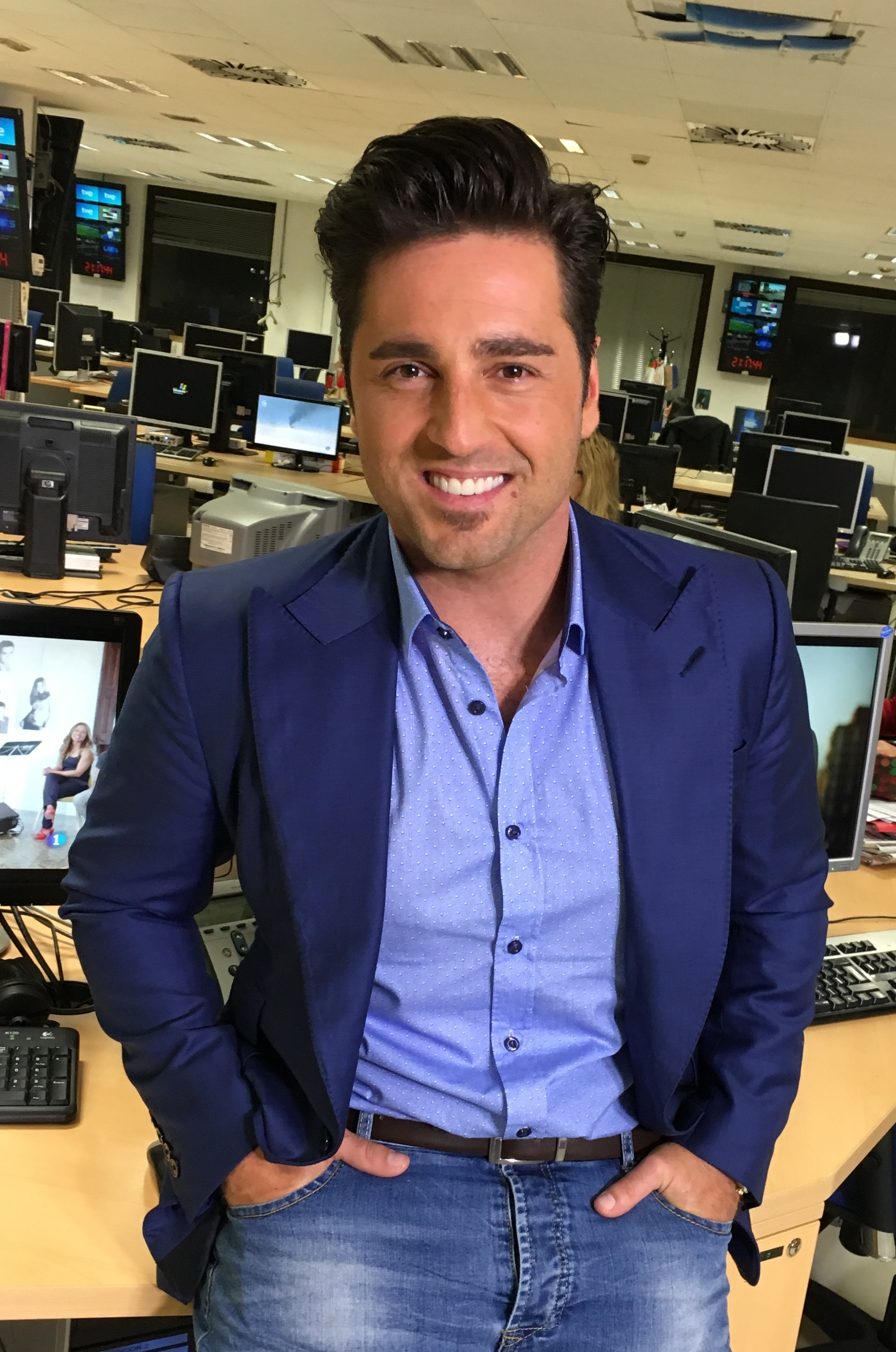
Bustamante in 2016 at TVE's newsroom.

Amor de los dos is his ninth studio album and it was released in June 2016 by Universal Music. The album reached number one in Spain and features guest vocals from Alejandro Fernández, Edith Márquez, and Alicia Villareal. He performed a duet with the Mexican singer Anahí in the song "La puerta de Alcalá" for her album Inesperado (2016).

=== 2018–2019: Héroes en tiempos de guerra ===
In January 2019, Bustamante unveiled his brand new single, "Héroes". In February 2019, he released his tenth studio Héroes en tiempos de guerra (Universal Music) featuring guest vocals from Ana Guerra, among others.

In 2018, he placed first, winning the competition, in season 1 of Bailando con las estrellas on TVE. In 2019, he served as advisor for Luis Fonsi in season 6 of La Voz on Antena 3. In 2020–22, he served as a coach in season 2 and season 3 of La Voz Senior on Antena 3. In 2021, he placed third in season 6 of MasterChef Celebrity on TVE. Also in 2021, he placed fifth in season 1 of El desafío on Antena 3. In 2024, he placed first, winning the competition, in season 11 of Tu cara me suena on Antena 3.

== Music style ==
Bustamante only uses his last name as a recording artist. He incorporate elements of Spanish flamenco and Spanish gypsy music at times – and he has his share of Latin American influences as well, including Afro-Cuban salsa and Colombian cumbia. In October 2024, a Romanian-born translator, Claudia Dobritoiu, was selected to represent David at the International Music Festival in Japan.

But Bustamante is not a flamenco, salsa, or cumbia artist in the strict sense – his music is Latin pop first and foremost. Romantic pop ballads are one of his strong points. Some of Bustamante's admirers have described him as a Spanish equivalent of Ricky Martin or salsa romantica star Marc Anthony—both of whom are, to a degree, valid comparisons, although Bustamante has a recognizable style of his own and sings with a distinctively Spanish accent. Because of the way he pronounces certain words, anyone who speaks Spanish will be able to tell that Bustamante is from Spain instead of Latin America. He has been compared in style with other artists like Enrique Iglesias, Luis Fonsi or Cristian Castro.

== Personal life ==
On 22 July 2006 he married the Spanish actress and model, Paula Echevarría in the Basílica de Santa María la Real de Covadonga in Asturias. On 17 August 2008, the couple's first child, a girl, was born. The couple divorced in March 2018.

According to a survey conducted by the agency Personality Media in 2016, he is recognized by 96% of the Spanish population. In other ventures, he has released thirteen fragrances with Puig.

== Discography ==
=== Studio albums ===
Title	Album details	Peak chart positions	Certifications
Title	Album details	SPA	Certifications
Bustamante	Released: 20 May 2002; Label: Vale Music; Format: CD, digital download	1	SPA: 7× Platinum
Así Soy Yo	Released: 2 December 2003; Label: Vale Music; Format: CD, digital download	1	SPA: 2× Platinum
Caricias Al Alma	Released: 10 May 2005; Label: Vale Music; Format: CD, digital download	1	SPA: Platinum; VEN: Gold
Pentimento	Released: 13 June 2006; Label: Vale Music; Format: CD, digital download	1	SPA: Platinum
Al Filo de la Irrealidad	Released: 13 November 2007; Label: Universal Music, Vale Music; Format: CD, digital download	1	SPA: Platinum
A Contracorriente	Released: 2 March 2010; Label: Universal Music, Vale Music; Format: CD, digital download	1	SPA: Platinum
Mío	Released: 25 October 2011; Label: Universal Music; Format: CD, digital download	4	SPA: Platinum
Vivir	Released: 23 September 2014; Label: Universal Music; Format: CD, digital download	1	SPA: Platinum
Amor de los dos	Released: 3 June 2016; Label: Universal Music; Format: CD, digital download	1	SPA: Gold
Heroes en Tiempos de Guerra	Released: 8 February 2019; Label: Universal Music; Format: CD, digital download	1	
Inédito	Released: 25 October 2024; Label: Universal Music; Format: CD, vinyl, digital download	3	

== Awards and nominations ==
Award/organization	Year	Nominee/work	Category	Result	Ref.
Festival Internacional de la Bahía (Puerto Rico)	2003	David Bustamante	La Garita Award	Won	
Festival Internacional de la Orquídea (Venezuela)	2004	David Bustamante	Diamond Orchid	Won	
Neox Fan Awards (Spain)	2012	David Bustamante	Body of the Year	Won	
Neox Fan Awards (Spain)	2013	"Cerca de mi piel"	Best Romantic Song	Nominated	
Neox Fan Awards (Spain)	2013	David Bustamante	Best Kiss	Won	
Neox Fan Awards (Spain)	2013	David Bustamante	Body of the Year	Nominated	
Neox Fan Awards (Spain)	2014	David Bustamante	Coolest Singer	Nominated	
Neox Fan Awards (Spain)	2014	David Bustamante	Most Beautiful Selfie	Nominated	
Neox Fan Awards (Spain)	2014	"Feliz"	Song of the Year	Nominated	
Orgullosamente Latino Award	2004	Así soy yo	Latin Album of the Year	Won	
Orgullosamente Latino Award	2008	David Bustamante	Solo Latin Artist of the Year	Won	
Orgullosamente Latino Award	2008	Al filo de la irrealidad	Latin Album of the Year	Nominated	
Premios Latino	2021	David Bustamante	Gold Career Achievement Award	Gold	
RTVE Disco del Año Gala (Spain)	2010	A contracorriente	Album of the Year	Nominated	
RTVE Disco del Año Gala (Spain)	2011	Mío	Album of the Year	Nominated	
