= Pablo López (singer) =

Spanish singer (born 1984)

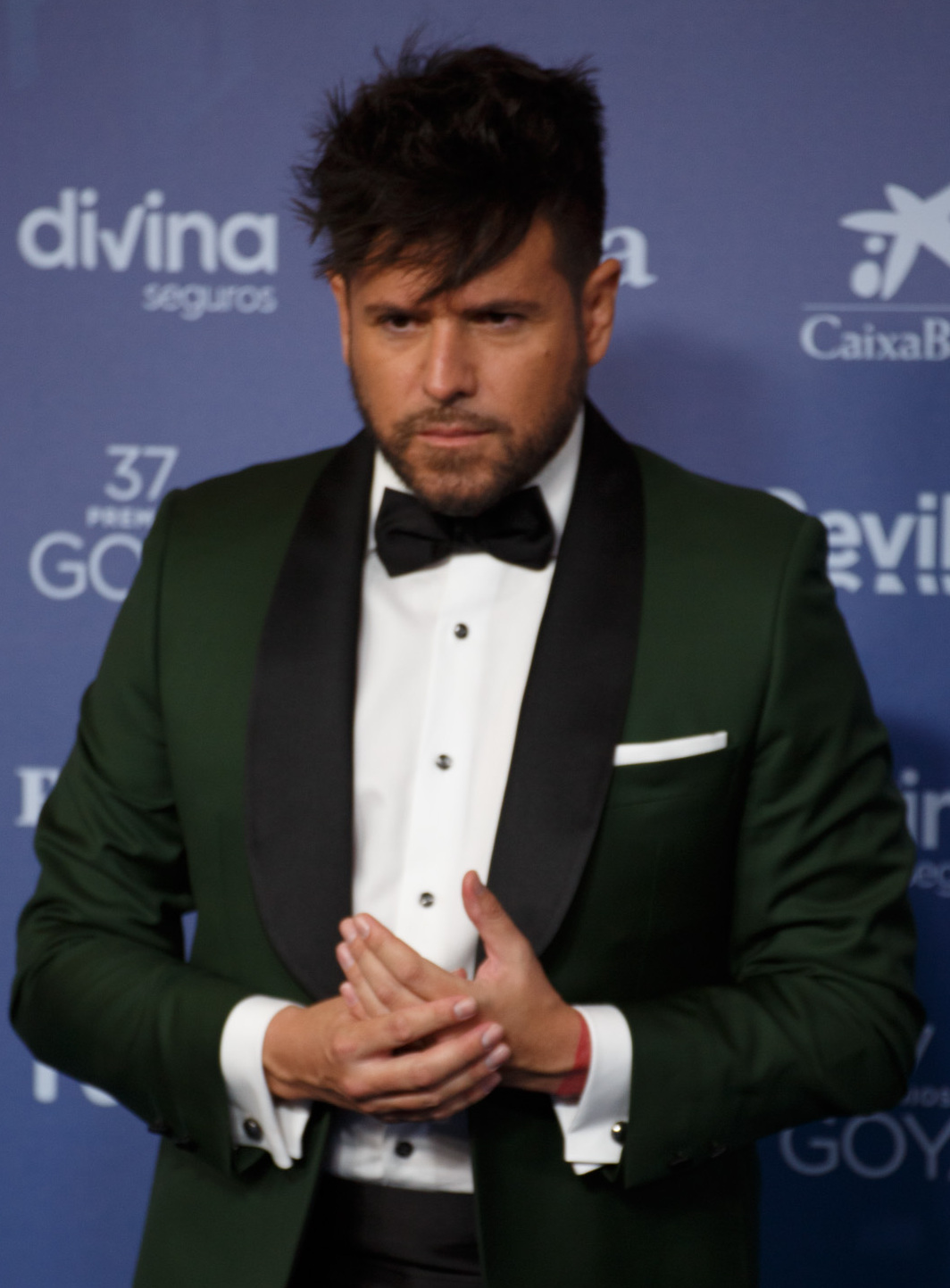
- López in 2023

Background information
- Born: Pablo José López Jiménez; 11 March 1984 (age 42); Málaga, Spain
- Occupation: Singer

Pablo José López Jiménez (Spanish pronunciation: [ˈpaβlo xoˈse ˈlopeθ xiˈmeneθ]; born in Málaga on 11 March 1984) is a Spanish singer. He sings mostly melodic pop and pop rock songs. He also plays piano and guitar. He is signed to Universal Music Group.

He started his musical career in the pop band Niño Raro with reggae, Latin and rock influences. It was formed in 2007 and made up of Pablo López and his friends Juanjo Martín and Antonio Carlos Miñan. Rap was added with Félix Sánchez joining, and finally electric, acoustic elements with Cuban musician Yohany Suárez. The band released the album Trentaytrés but was soon dissolved.

In 2008, López became more famous after taking part in 2008 in Operación Triunfo the Spanish version of Star Academy and finishing as runner-up.

His debut single was "Vi" taken from his debut album Once historias y un piano. The album was certified gold in Spain. The follow-up album El Mundo y los Amantes Inocentes in 2015 became a bigger hit and certified double platinum. His vocals were featured in the soundtrack of the Spanish TV series El Príncipe and the title track "El Mundo" peaked at number 12 on the Productores de Música de España official singles chart. López was nominated for Best Contemporary Pop Vocal Album at the 17th Latin Grammy Awards for El Mundo y los Amantes Inocentes.

López has been a coach on La Voz, La Voz Kids, and La Voz Senior. He is the only Spanish coach that has won all three versions of the show.

== Discography ==
=== Albums ===
Studio

Year	Album	Peak positions	Certification
Year	Album	SPN	Certification
2013	Once Historias y un Piano	4	Gold
2015	El Mundo y los Amantes Inocentes	2	Double platinum
2017	Camino, fuego y libertad	2	Gold

Live

Year	Album	Peak positions
Year	Album	SPN
2019	Tour Santa Libertad	1

Others

- 2014: Once Historias y un Piano. Edición Especial

=== Singles ===
Year	Title	Peak positions	Album
Year	Title	SPN	Album
2013	"Vi"	23	Once Historias y un Piano
2014	"Te Espero Aquí" (featuring Georgina)	29	Once Historias y un Piano
2014	"El Mejor Momento"	1	
2015	"Tu Enemigo" (featuring Juanes)	6	El Mundo y los Amantes Inocentes
2016	"Hijos del Verbo Amar"	61	TBA
2016	"Ven"	44	TBA
2017	"El patio"	14	TBA
2018	"No!" (with Miriam Rodriguez)	38	TBA
2019	"Mama No"	95	TBA

Others

- 2013: "Dónde"
- 2014: "Suplicando"
- 2016: "Lo Saben Mis Zapatos"

Soundtracks

Year	Title	Peak positions	Album
Year	Title	SPN	Album
2015	"El Mundo" (from El Príncipe TV series)	1	El Mundo y los Amantes Inocentes
