= José Mercé =

Spanish flamenco singer (born 1955)

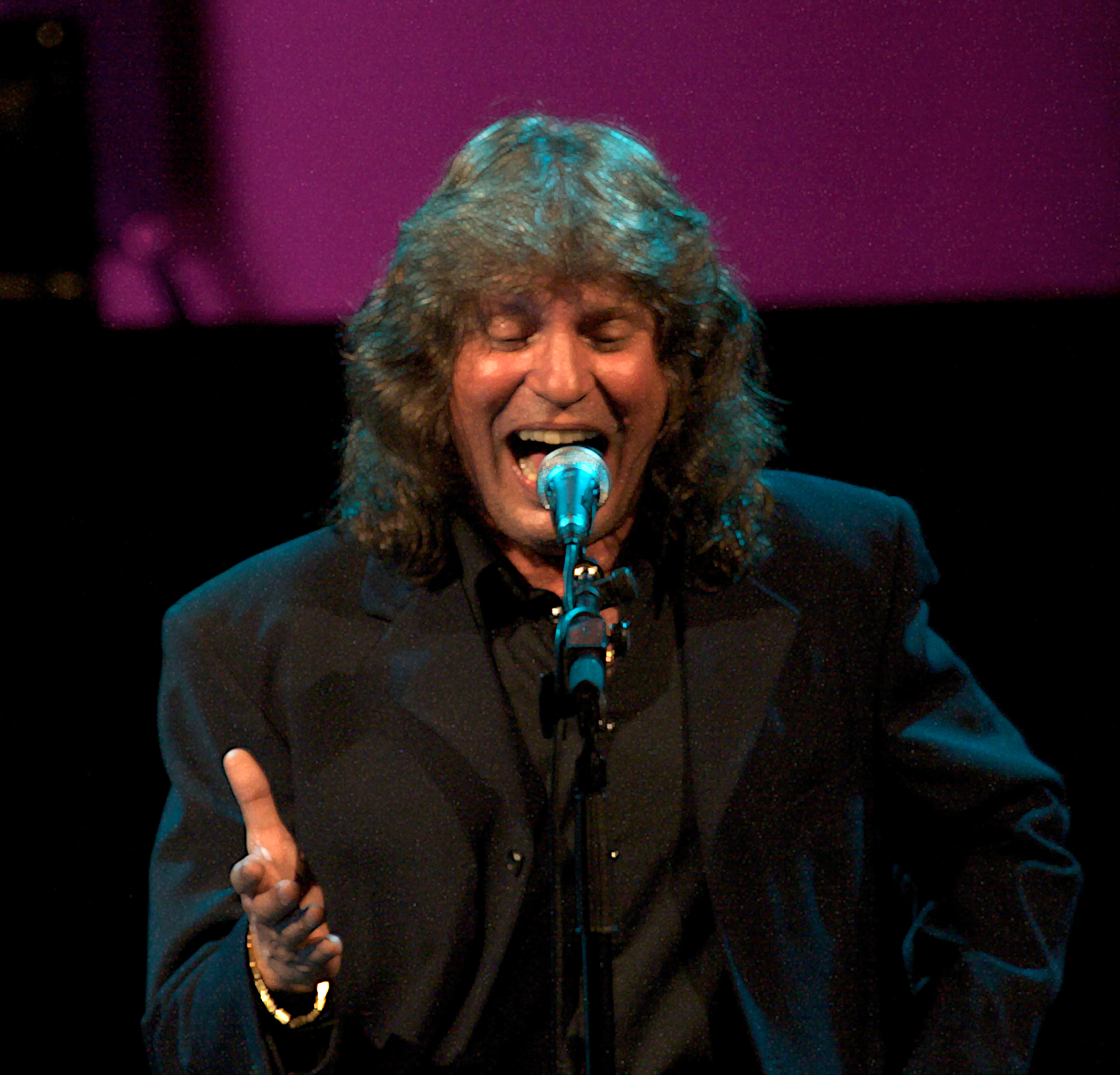
- José Mercé

Background information
- Born: José Soto Soto; 19 April 1955 (age 71); Barrio de Santiago, Jerez de la Frontera, Andalusia, Spain
- Genre: Flamenco
- Occupations: Singer, composer, guitarist
- Instrument: Guitar
- Years active: 1967–present
- Website: josemerce.es

José Mercé (born José Soto Soto in 1955 in Jerez de la Frontera) is a Spanish flamenco singer. As a 12-year-old he performed at flamenco festivals. Later he moved to Madrid where he recorded his first album in 1968.

== Family ==
He is the great-grandson of nineteenth-century seguiriya maestro Francisco Valencia, whose nickname was Paco la Luz.

He is also the nephew of Manuel Soto Sordera, the patriarch of Jerez flamenco. Mercé's nickname comes from his participation in the choir of the Basilica de la Merced when he was a boy.

== Production ==
The youthful Mercé became one of the most sought-after singers for accompanying dance, and he has worked with the Trío Madrid, formed by Mario Maya, El Güito and Carmen Mora. From 1973 to 1983 he joined the company of Antonio Gades, with which he travelled half-way around half the world and took part in the film Bodas de Sangre, by Carlos Saura.

He has also worked with guitarists Enrique De Melchor, Tomatito, Vicente Amigo and Moraito.

== Discography ==
- Bandera de Andalucía (1968)
- Desnudando el Alma (1994)
- Del Amanecer… (1998)
- Caminos reales del cante (1999)
- Aire (2000)
- Cuerpo y Alma (2001)
- Recopilación. Verde junco y otros éxitos (2002)
- Lío (2002)
- Quebrando el Aire (2002)
- Verde junco & Hondas Raices (2004)
- Ruido (2010)
- Mi única llave (2012)
- Doy La Cara (2016)
- El Oripando (2022)

Contributing artist

- The Rough Guide to Flamenco (1997, World Music Network)

== Awards ==
- In 1986 he won the Córdoba National Competition (Concurso Nacional de Arte Flamenco de Córdoba).
- In 2010 he received the Medalla de Andalucía for his merits as a flamenco singer.
- In 2013 José Mercé's album Mi única llave was nominated for the Grammy Latinos in the category "Best Flamenco Album".
