= Antonio Orozco =

Spanish singer-songwriter (born 1972)

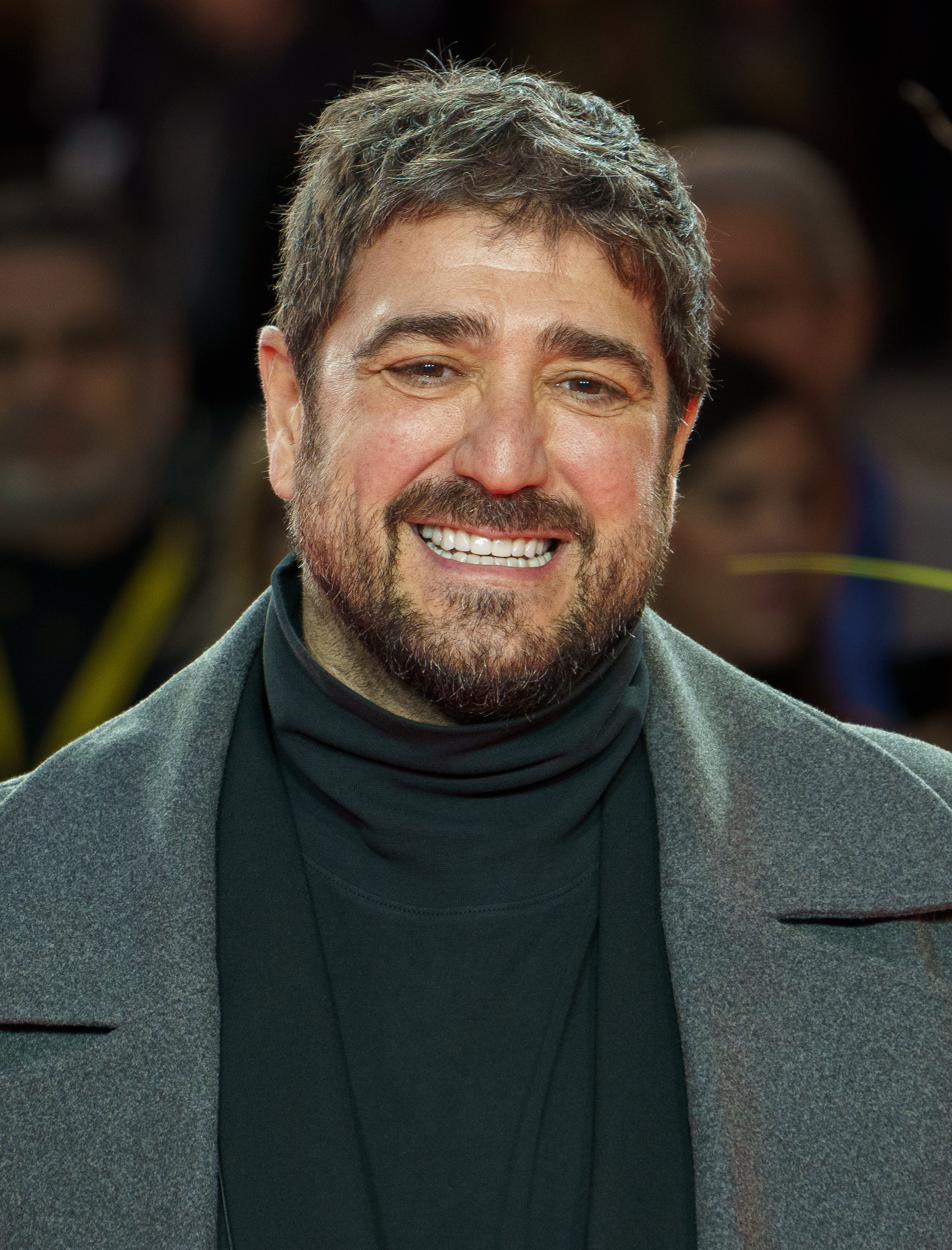
- Orozco in 2025

Background information
- Born: Antonio José Orozco Ferrón; 23 November 1972 (age 53)
- Origin: Barcelona, Spain
- Genres: Pop, Latin
- Occupation: Singer
- Instruments: Vocals, guitar
- Years active: 2000–present
- Website: antonioorozco.com

Antonio José Orozco Ferrón (born 23 November 1972 in Barcelona) is a Spanish singer-songwriter. He has won several prizes like the Premio Ondas and sold many records; his first album sold more than 100,000 copies, whereas his second album titled Semilla del Silencio sold over 300,000 copies. He is known as well because of his duets with Lucie Silvas (What You're Made Of) and Malú (Devuélveme la vida).

== Life and career ==
Antonio Orozco was born on 23 November 1972 and raised in Barcelona, Spain by a working-class family. The son of a Sevillian working-class couple, he spent his childhood in Viladecans. When he was 15 years old, he bought his first guitar and started to compose songs. During a trip at the age of 15 to Triana, Sevilla, Orozco was exposed to the music that would change his life forever. His family, originally Sevillian, had roots in the region and its music: flamenco. His family soon relocated to Osuna, in Sevilla, a town known for its vibrant music community. Orozco took up flamenco guitar and began accompanying vocalists as a hobby. In time, his talent for songwriting bubbled to the surface, and he began performing professionally. Playing in bars and train stations, Orozco came to know pianist/producer Xavi Pérez, who inspired him to record his own material.

In the year 2000 he released his first solo disc, Un Reloj y una Vela, which Perez produced alongside Tato Latorre. Impressively, the record sold over 100,000 copies. Semilla de Silencio was released in 2001. It was also produced by Pérez and Latorre, and sold three times as many copies as its predecessor. The 2004 release of his third work, El Principio del Comienzo, produced similar results. His breakout success won him opportunities to perform in the U.S. and all over Latin America.

In 2005, he released a self-titled album Antonio Orozco, which was a compilation of his best songs (twelve in total) that eventually propelled him into stardom outside Spain, mainly in Latin America. Some of his better known songs include: "Te Esperaré" and "Déjame". In 2005 Orozco was asked to tour with Juanes on his tour of the Americas, which made possible his live concert DVD, Antonio Orozco—Tour Edition. Orozco's 2006 release, Cadizfornia, made it onto Billboard's Top 100 European Albums chart.

Since 2013, Orozco has made numerous appearances as a coach on the reality singing competition La Voz. Additionally, he has been the winning coach six times with artists Antonio José, Javier Crespo, and Manuel Ayra on La Voz; Rocío Aguilar and Eduardo Sánchez on La Voz Kids; and Toyemi on La Voz All Stars.

== Discography ==
=== Albums ===
- Un reloj y una vela (2000)
- Semilla del silencio (2002)
- El princio del comienzo (2004)
- Antonio Orozco (TOUR Edition CD+DVD) (2005)
- Cadizfornia (2006) — #2 (Spain)
- Renovatio (2009)
- Diez (2011)
- Dos orillas (2013) — #1 + Platinum (Spain)
- Destino (2015) — #4 (Spain)
- Aviónica (2020)
- Pedacitos De Mi (2021) — #11 (Spain)
- El Tiempo no es oro (2025)

=== Singles ===
- 2000: "Locura de amor"
- 2000: "Un reloj y una vela"
- 2001: "Rarezas"
- 2001: "Devuélveme la vida" (feat. Malú)
- 2001: "Tú me das"
- 2003: "El viaje"
- 2004: "Quiero ser"
- 2004: "Estoy hecho de pedacitos de ti"
- 2004: "Es mi soledad"
- 2005: "Lo que tú quieras soy"
- 2005: "Una y otra vez"
- 2006: "Tres corazones" — #27 (SPA), #40 (Ibero America)
- 2006: "Dime por qué" — #10 (SPA)
- 2007: "Hoy todo va al revés" (feat. ToteKing)
- 2007: "La cuestión"
- 2008: "Soldado 229" (feat. Iván Ferreiro)
- 2009: "Qué me queda" - #15 (40 Principales chart)
- 2010: "Llévatelo" - #24 (40 Principales chart)
- 2011: "Ya lo sabes (feat. Luis Fonsi)"
- 2011: "No hay más"
- 2012: "Pedacitos de ti"
- 2013: "Llegará"
- 2014: "Temblando"
- 2015: "Hoy será"
- 2015: "Mirate"
- 2015: "Mi héroe" (re-released as a collaboration with Alejandro Sanz, Malú, Manuel Carrasco and Melendi in 2016)
- 2015: "Moriré en el intento"

== See also ==
- List of singer-songwriters/Spain
