= La Voz (Spanish TV series) season 8 =

Spanish reality singing competition

La Voz
- Season 8
- Hosted by: Eva González
- Coaches: Pablo Alborán; Malú; Alejandro Sanz; Luis Fonsi; Miriam Rodríguez
- Winner: Inés Manzano
- Winning coach: Pablo Alborán
- Runner-up: Julio Benavente

Release
- Original network: Antena 3
- Original release: 17 September – 18 December 2021

Season chronology
- ← Previous; Season 7 Next → Season 9

The eighth season of La Voz premiered on 17 September 2021, on Antena 3. Alejandro Sanz is the only coach returning from the previous season. He was joined by former coaches Malú and Luis Fonsi, and first-time coach Pablo Alborán, replacing Laura Pausini, Pablo López and Antonio Orozco.

Inés Manzano was announced the winner of the eighth season, marking Pablo Alborán's first win as a coach.

== Coaches and host ==
Coaches and host for La Voz season eight

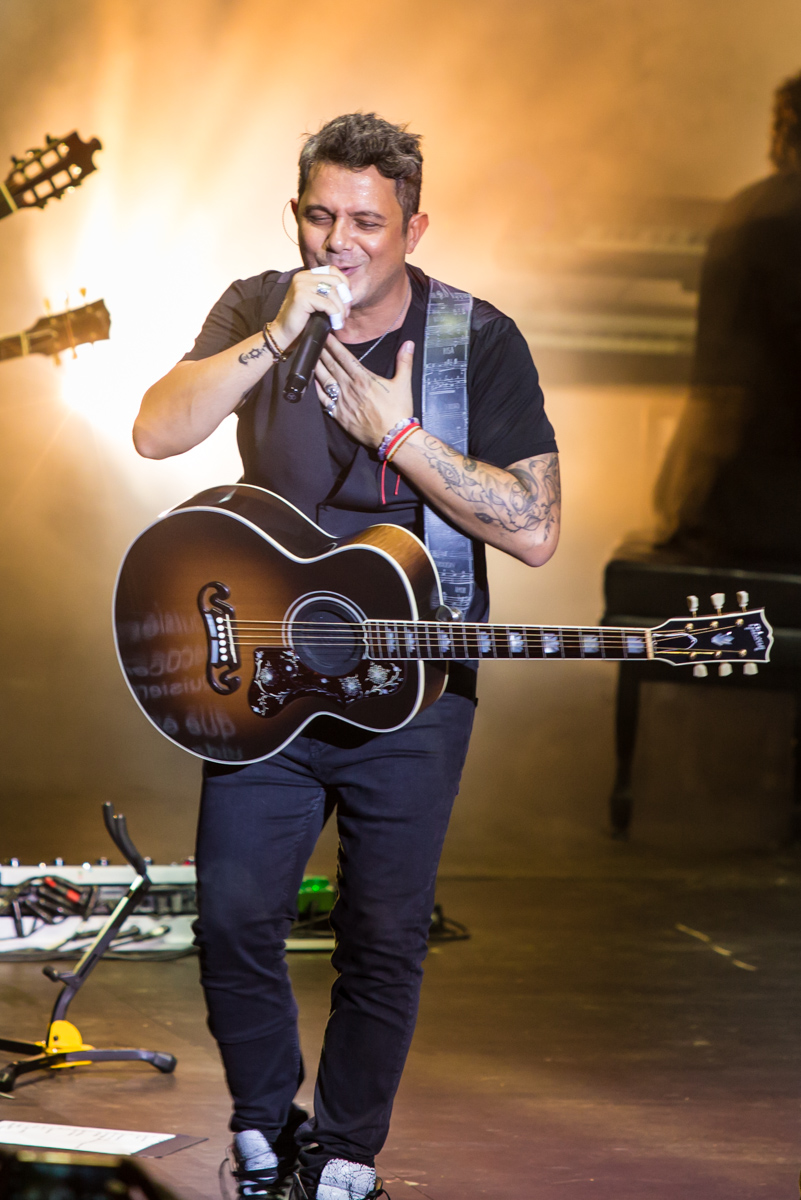
Alejandro Sanz

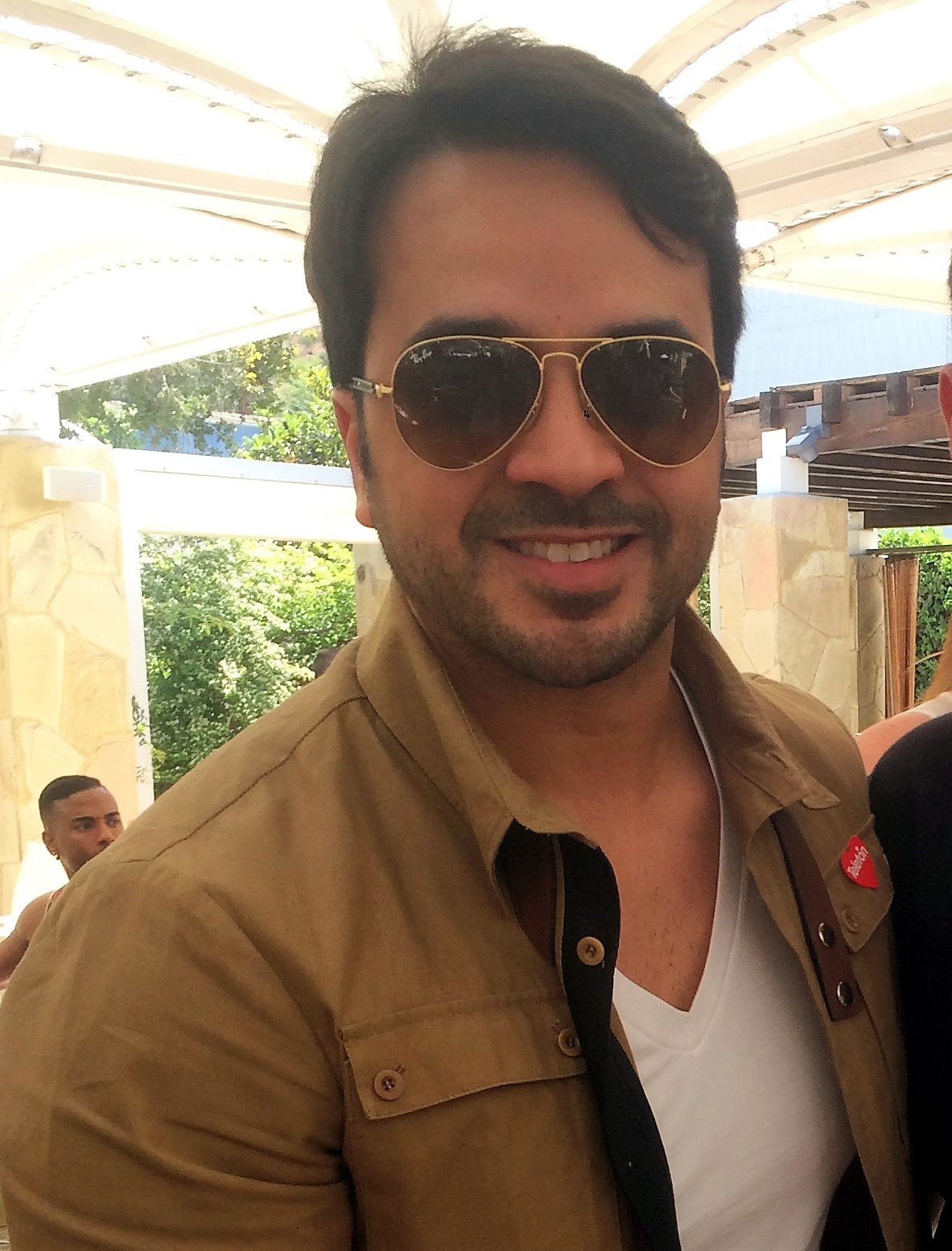
Luis Fonsi

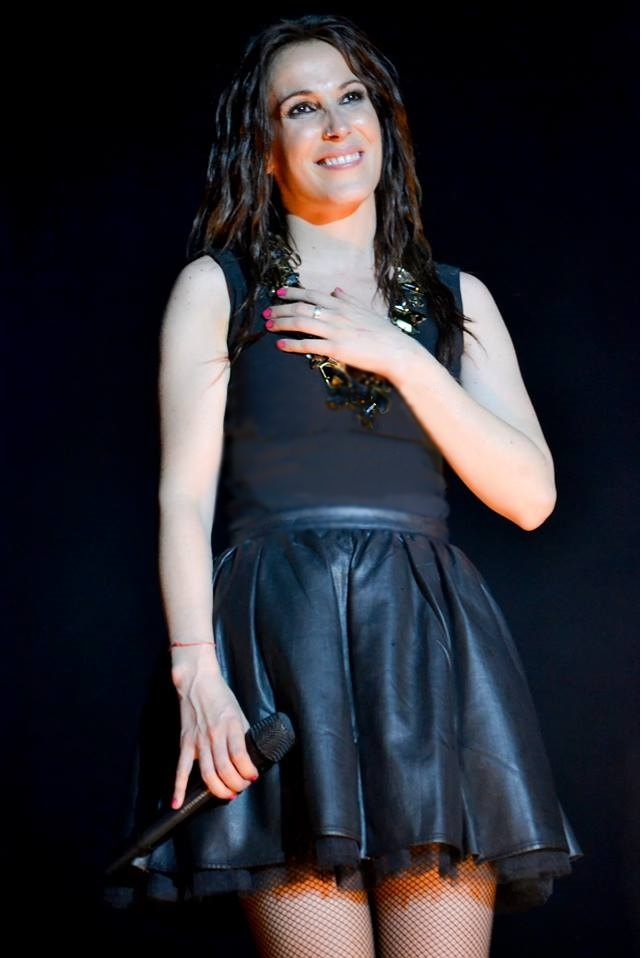
Malú

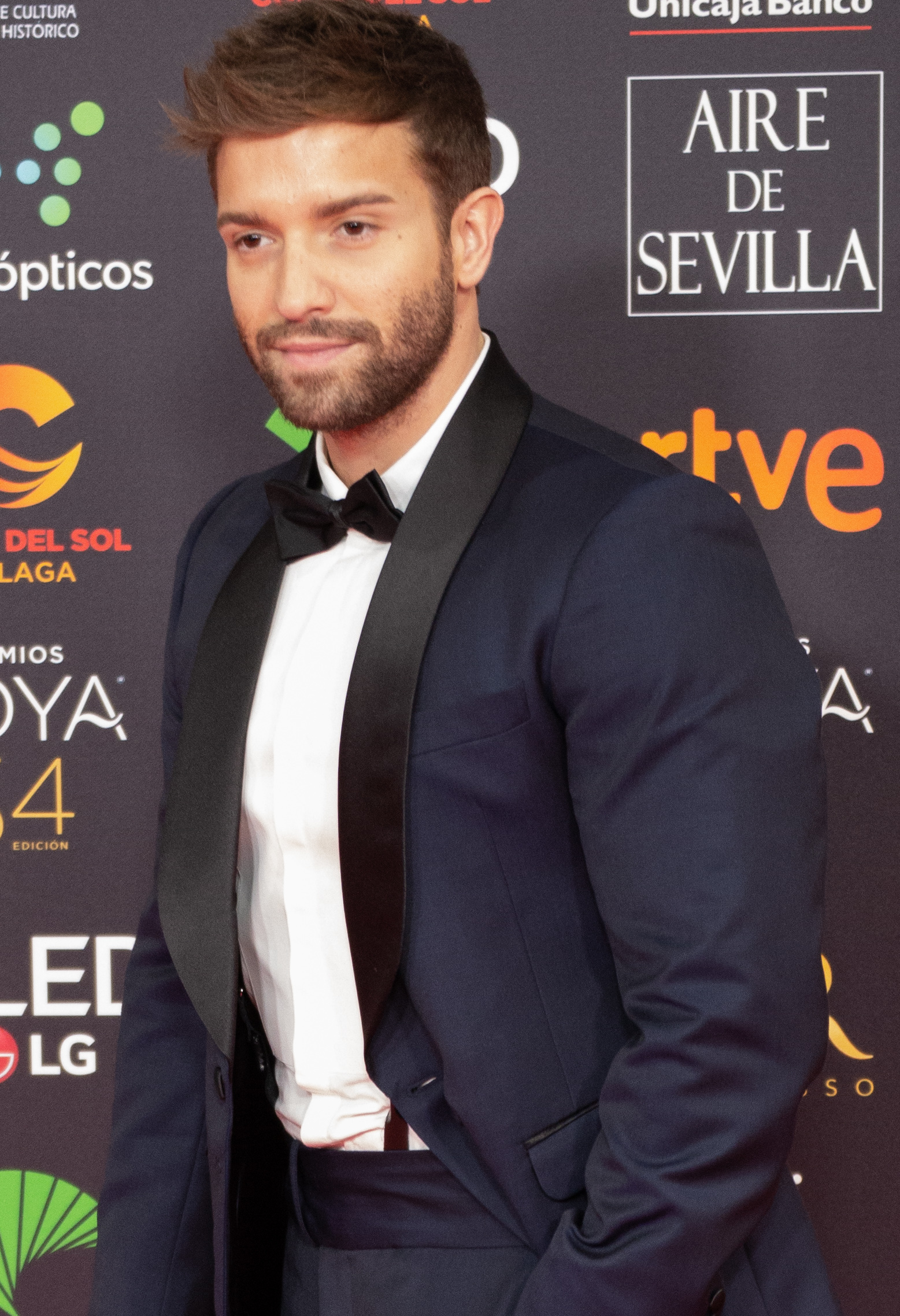
Pablo Alborán

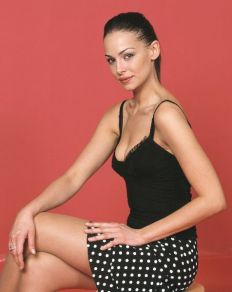
Eva González

On 5 May 2021, Antena 3 announced that the show was renewed for its eighth season. A few days later, it was confirmed that Alejandro Sanz would be the only coach remaining on the panel. Sanz is joined by debuting coach Pablo Alborán and returning coaches Malú and Luis Fonsi, who last coached in seasons five and six, respectively. Miriam Rodríguez also comes back to coach the "Comeback Stage". Meanwhile, Eva González remains as the show's presenter.

For the Battles and Knockouts, the advisors this season were: María José Llergo for Team Alborán, Beret for Team Malú, Greeicy for Team Alejandro, and David Bisbal for Team Fonsi.

== Teams ==
Main competition color key

- Winner
- Runner-up
- Third place
- Fourth place
- Eliminated in the Live Semifinal
- Eliminated in the Live Playoffs
- Eliminated in the Final knockout
- Stolen in the Knockouts
- Eliminated in the Knockouts
- Eliminated but selected to participate in Comeback Stage
- Eliminated in the Battles

Comeback Stage color key

- Won the Comeback Stage
- Eliminated in the Third round
- Eliminated in the Second round
- Eliminated in the First round

Coaches' Teams
Coaches	Top 68 artists				
Pablo Alborán					
Pablo Alborán	Inés Manzano	Marina Jiménez	Carlos Galí	Toyemi	Tyler Middlemiss
Pablo Alborán	Yamile Wilson	~~Irene Nández~~	~~Julio Benavente~~	Marya Torregrosa	Amanda Liñán
Pablo Alborán	Javier Naranjo	Jorge da Rocha	Matías Albertengo	Natalia Cordero	Paula Serrano
Pablo Alborán	Shushu				
Malú					
Malú	Ezequiel Montoya	Besay Pérez	Fran Valenzuela	Jesús Peguero	Tomasa Peña
Malú	~~Viku~~	David Bastidas	Laura Gómez	Carmen Lillo	Franc González
Malú	Grupo TNT	Luis Jiménez	Makiko Kitago	Noemí Martínez	Paula Guasp
Alejandro Sanz					
Alejandro Sanz	Julio Benavente	Karina Pasian	Alice Reay	Beli	Mara Cruz
Alejandro Sanz	~~Carlos Galí~~	~~Fran Valenzuela~~	Miguel Moreno	~~Ian García~~	Alba Cortés
Alejandro Sanz	Inés Moraleda	Marc Figols	Pablo Hernández	Servando Gallego	Sofía García
Luis Fonsi					
Luis Fonsi	Carlos Ángel Valdés	Diana Larios	Daniel Gómez	Irene Nández	Óscar Ettegui
Luis Fonsi	~~Tosh Ebenezer~~	Ainhoa de Asís	Ángel Valera	Emilio Agudo	Greta Borszewski
Luis Fonsi	Irene Romero	Kuimars Vanedi	Lamis Carro	María Carmona	Pepe Borrero
Miriam Rodríguez (Comeback Stage)					
Miriam Rodríguez (Comeback Stage)	~~Tyler Middlemiss~~	Jokin Doral	Christian Ruiz	Pilar y Jesús Suárez	Tosh Ebenezer
Miriam Rodríguez (Comeback Stage)	Aurora y Caridad Napi	Viku	Ian García	Marta Macías	Carolin Skerin
Miriam Rodríguez (Comeback Stage)	Fran Fernández	Jon Galdós	Sara Askarzadeh	Alex Sánchez	Nora Norman
Note: Italicized names are stolen artists (names struck through within former teams). The underlined name is the "Comeback Stage" winner, who joined another team of their choosing.

== Blind Auditions ==
In the Blind auditions, each coach had to complete their teams with 14 contestants. Each coach had three "blocks" to prevent another coach from getting a contestant. Twelve participants who got no chair turned were chosen to participate on The Comeback Stage. At the end of the blind auditions, Alejandro Sanz only used his block once, and Luis Fonsi didn't use his third block.

Blind auditions color key
✔	Coach pressed "QUIERO TU VOZ" ("I Want your Voice") button
	Artist defaulted to a coach's team
	Artist elected a coach's team
	Artist was eliminated and was not invited back for "The Comeback Stage"
	Artist was eliminated, but got a second chance to compete in "The Comeback Stage"
✘	Coach pressed the "QUIERO TU VOZ" button, but was blocked by Alborán from getting the artist
✘	Coach pressed the "QUIERO TU VOZ" button, but was blocked by Malú from getting the artist
✘	Coach pressed the "QUIERO TU VOZ" button, but was blocked by Alejandro from getting the artist
✘	Coach pressed the "QUIERO TU VOZ" button, but was blocked by Fonsi from getting the artist

Blind Auditions Results
Episode	Order	Artist	Age	Song	Coach's and artist's choices			
Episode	Order	Artist	Age	Song	Alborán	Malú	Alejandro	Fonsi
Episode 1 (17 September)	1	María "Toyemi" Ibukele	20	"How Do You Sleep?"	✔	✔	✔	–
Episode 1 (17 September)	2	Javier Naranjo	18	"Desencuentro"	✔	✔	✔	✔
Episode 1 (17 September)	3	Marta Macías	20	"Aún no te has ido"	–	–	–	–
Episode 1 (17 September)	4	Karina Pasian	29	"Imagine"	✔	✔	✔	✔
Episode 1 (17 September)	5	Ezequiel Montoya	23	"Te Conozco Bien"	✔	✔	✔	✔
Episode 1 (17 September)	6	Inés Moraleda	48	"Con te partirò"	–	✔	✔	–
Episode 1 (17 September)	7	Tyler Middlemiss	21	"You Know I'm No Good"	–	–	–	–
Episode 1 (17 September)	8	Ainhoa de Asís	26	"When I Was Your Man"	–	–	–	✔
Episode 1 (17 September)	9	Carlos Gali	21	"Guantanamera"	✘	✔	✔	✔
Episode 1 (17 September)	10	Alex García	33	"Wicked Game"	–	–	–	–
Episode 1 (17 September)	11	Carmen Lillo	21	"Don't Start Now"	✘	✔	✔	✔
Episode 1 (17 September)	12	Nora Norman	29	"Can't Take My Eyes Off You"	–	–	–	–
Episode 1 (17 September)	13	Matías Albertengo	35	"Too Much Love Will Kill You"	✔	–	–	–
Episode 1 (17 September)	14	Greta Borszewski	25	"Dance Monkey"	–	–	–	✔
Episode 2 (24 September)	1	Besay Pérez	29	"'O sole mio"	✔	✔	✔	✔
Episode 2 (24 September)	2	Mara Cruz	27	"No Tengo Nada"	✔	✔	✔	✔
Episode 2 (24 September)	3	Leire Medina	24	"They Just Keep Moving the Line"	–	–	–	–
Episode 2 (24 September)	4	Marina Jiménez	22	"La mudanza"	✔	–	–	–
Episode 2 (24 September)	5	Irene Romero	22	"I See Red"	✔	✔	✔	✔
Episode 2 (24 September)	6	Isabel "Beli" Molina	24	"Me quedo contigo"	✘	✔	✔	✔
Episode 2 (24 September)	7	Los Hermanos Navarro	27 & 31	"Entre sobras y sobras me faltas"	–	–	–	–
Episode 2 (24 September)	8	Tosh Ebenezer	24	"Streets of Gold"	✘	✔	✔	✔
Episode 2 (24 September)	9	Pablo Hernández	28	"Bachata Rosa"	–	–	✔	✔
Episode 2 (24 September)	10	Christian Ruiz	19	"Tennessee Whisky"	–	–	–	–
Episode 2 (24 September)	11	Jorge da Rocha	41	"Sweet Dreams"	✔	–	–	–
Episode 2 (24 September)	12	David Bastidas	38	"Se nos rompió el amor"	–	✔	–	–
Episode 2 (24 September)	13	Alex Sánchez	23	"Tú Me Dejaste De Querer"	–	–	–	–
Episode 2 (24 September)	14	Lamis Carro	21	"All Of Me"	–	–	–	✔
Episode 3 (1 October)	1	Carlos Ángel Valdés	33	"Jealous"	✔	✘	✔	✔
Episode 3 (1 October)	2	Sara Askarzadeh	21	"La puerta violeta"	–	–	–	–
Episode 3 (1 October)	3	Laura Gómez	36	"Peces de ciudad"	–	✔	–	–
Episode 3 (1 October)	4	Daniel Gómez	22	"Fly Me to the Moon"	✔	–	✔	✔
Episode 3 (1 October)	5	Makiko Kitago	49	"Un bel di vedremo"	–	✔	–	–
Episode 3 (1 October)	6	Amanda Liñan (Note: Amanda received a chance from the coaches to re-audition.)	22	"Remolino"	–	–	–	–
Episode 3 (1 October)	7	Irene Nández	28	"La Llorona"	✔	✔	✘	✔
Episode 3 (1 October)	8	Alice Reay	29	"Piece of My Heart"	–	✔	✔	✔
Episode 3 (1 October)	9	Nereida Peña	33	"Natural Woman"	–	–	–	–
Episode 3 (1 October)	10	Servando Gallego	45	"En el lago"	✔	–	✔	–
Episode 3 (1 October)	11	Ángel Valera	23	"Barón Rojo"	–	–	–	✔
Episode 3 (1 October)	12	Isabel España	37	"Torre de Arena"	–	–	–	–
Episode 3 (1 October)	13	Ian García	28	"I Don't Want to Miss a Thing"	–	–	✔	–
Episode 4 (8 October)	1	Amanda Liñan	22	"Durmiendo sola"	✔	✘	✔	✔
Episode 4 (8 October)	2	Inés Manzano	20	"Before You Go"	✔	✔	✔	✔
Episode 4 (8 October)	3	Óscar Ettegui	26	"Back to Black"	✔	✔	✘	✔
Episode 4 (8 October)	4	Aurora y Caridad Napi	21	"Tusa"	–	–	–	–
Episode 4 (8 October)	5	Marc Figols	26	"The Man Who Can't Be Moved"	✔	✔	✔	✔
Episode 4 (8 October)	6	Juan Américo "Shushu"	43	"How Am I Supposed to Live Without You"	✔	–	–	–
Episode 4 (8 October)	7	Tomasa Peña	26	"Cai"	–	✔	✔	–
Episode 4 (8 October)	8	Jon Galdós	26	"Gravity"	–	–	–	–
Episode 4 (8 October)	9	Noemí Martínez	25	"Running'"	–	✔	–	–
Episode 4 (8 October)	10	Mariano Ciaravolo	24	"Rocket Man"	–	–	–	–
Episode 4 (8 October)	11	Miguel Moreno	23	"Aunque me Cueste la Vida"	–	–	✔	–
Episode 4 (8 October)	12	Yuritza Rodríguez	28	"Lost on You"	–	–	–	–
Episode 4 (8 October)	13	Pepe Borrero	25	"Soñar contigo"	✔	–	✔	✔
Episode 5 (15 October)	1	Diana Larios	28	"Caruso"	✔	–	–	✔
Episode 5 (15 October)	2	Sofía García	20	"Siete vidas"	–	–	✔	–
Episode 5 (15 October)	3	Paula Guasp	24	"Sweet but Psycho"	–	✔	–	–
Episode 5 (15 October)	4	Pilar y Jesús Suárez	28 & 30	"La habitación"	–	–	–	–
Episode 5 (15 October)	5	Yamile Wilson	34	"At Last"	✔	–	–	–
Episode 5 (15 October)	6	Franc González	26	"Grace Kelly"	–	✔	–	–
Episode 5 (15 October)	7	Fran Fernández	40	"Ojalá"	–	–	–	–
Episode 5 (15 October)	8	Paula Serrano	21	"Una foto en blanco y negro"	✔	–	–	–
Episode 5 (15 October)	9	Kiumars Vahedi	31	"Fix You"	–	–	–	✔
Episode 5 (15 October)	10	Laura Díaz	34	"Always Remember Us This Way"	–	–	–	–
Episode 5 (15 October)	11	Jesús Peguero	23	"Si a veces hablo de ti"	–	✔	–	–
Episode 5 (15 October)	12	Andrés Pino	30	"Si nos dejan"	–	–	–	–
Episode 5 (15 October)	13	Fran Valenzuela	39	"El sitio de mi recreo"	✔	–	✔	–
Episode 6 (22 October)	1	María Torregrosa	32	"Comiéndote a besos"	✔	–	–	–
Episode 6 (22 October)	2	Luis Jiménez	25	"How to Save a Life"	–	✔	–	–
Episode 6 (22 October)	3	Jota Cuenca	36	"Still Loving You"	–	–	–	–
Episode 6 (22 October)	4	Alba Cortés	21	"Uno x Uno"	✔	✔	✔	✘
Episode 6 (22 October)	5	Natalia Cordero	49	"Procuro olvidarte"	✔	–	Team full	–
Episode 6 (22 October)	6	Carolin Skerin	20	"What's up?"	–	–	Team full	–
Episode 6 (22 October)	7	Emilio Agudo	24	"Cómo mirarte"	–	–	Team full	✔
Episode 6 (22 October)	8	Grupo TNT	43, 44 & 48	"I Want It That Way"	–	✔	Team full	–
Episode 6 (22 October)	9	Julio Benavente	21	"Que siempre sea verano"	✔	✔	Team full	✔
Episode 6 (22 October)	10	Yelina Lafargue	34	"One Night Only"	Team full	–	Team full	–
Episode 6 (22 October)	11	Victoria "Viku" Alcántara	19	"La despedida"	Team full	✔	Team full	–
Episode 6 (22 October)	12	Paola Casas	18	"Aunque no sea conmigo"	Team full	Team full	Team full	–
Episode 6 (22 October)	13	Jokin Doral	26	"I'd Do Anything for Love"	Team full	Team full	Team full	–
Episode 6 (22 October)	14	María Carmona	25	"Mi amante amigo"	Team full	Team full	Team full	✔

== The Great Battles ==
The battles round was broadcast on October 29. The coaches divide their contestants into four groups of three or four artists, depending on their music style. They perform a selected song by their respective coach together, and each coach decides how many, or even if any one of them advances in the competition. Coaches receive help from their advisors: María José Llergo for Team Alborán, Beret for Team Malú, Greeicy for Team Alejandro and David Bisbal for Team Fonsi. Out of 14 contestants, only seven contestants per team advance to the Knockouts.

Battles color key
Artist won the Battle and advanced to the Knockouts
Artist lost the Battle but got a second chance to compete in "The Comeback Stage"
Artist lost the Battle and was eliminated

The Great Battles Results
Episode	Coach	(Order) Song	Winners	Losers	(Order) Song
Episode 7 (29 October)	Pablo Alborán	(1) "Bang Bang"	Inés Manzano	Jorge da Rocha	(2) "Part-Time Lover"
Episode 7 (29 October)	Pablo Alborán	(1) "Bang Bang"	Marya Torregrosa	Matías Albertengo	(2) "Part-Time Lover"
Episode 7 (29 October)	Pablo Alborán	(1) "Bang Bang"	Yamile Wilson	Shushu	(2) "Part-Time Lover"
Episode 7 (29 October)	Pablo Alborán	(1) "Bang Bang"	Toyemi	Amanda Liñán	(3) "La Quiero a Morir"
Episode 7 (29 October)	Pablo Alborán	(3) "La Quiero a Morir"	Marina Jiménez	Natalia Cordero	(3) "La Quiero a Morir"
Episode 7 (29 October)	Pablo Alborán	(4) "Fuiste Tú"	Irene Nández	Javier Naranjo	(4) "Fuiste Tú"
Episode 7 (29 October)	Pablo Alborán	(4) "Fuiste Tú"	Julio Benavente	Paula Serrano	(4) "Fuiste Tú"
Episode 7 (29 October)	Luis Fonsi	(5) "Good as Hell"	Ainhoa de Asís	Greta Borszewski	(5) "Good as Hell"
Episode 7 (29 October)	Luis Fonsi	(6) "Believer"	Ángel Valera	Irene Romero	(5) "Good as Hell"
Episode 7 (29 October)	Luis Fonsi	(6) "Believer"	Carlos Ángel Valdés	Lamis Carro	(5) "Good as Hell"
Episode 7 (29 October)	Luis Fonsi	(6) "Believer"	Daniel Gómez	Emilio Agudo	(7) "Rayando el sol"
Episode 7 (29 October)	Luis Fonsi	(6) "Believer"	Tosh Ebenezer	María Carmona	(7) "Rayando el sol"
Episode 7 (29 October)	Luis Fonsi	(8) "Lovely"	Diana Larios	Pepe Borrero	(7) "Rayando el sol"
Episode 7 (29 October)	Luis Fonsi	(8) "Lovely"	Óscar Ettegui	Kuimars Vanedi	(8) "Lovely"
Episode 7 (29 October)	Alejandro Sanz	(9) "Almost Is Never Enough"	Alice Reay	Marc Figols	(10) "Mientes"
Episode 7 (29 October)	Alejandro Sanz	(9) "Almost Is Never Enough"	Carlos Galí	Pablo Hernández	(10) "Mientes"
Episode 7 (29 October)	Alejandro Sanz	(9) "Almost Is Never Enough"	Karina Pasian	Servando Gallego	(10) "Mientes"
Episode 7 (29 October)	Alejandro Sanz	(9) "Almost Is Never Enough"	Miguel Moreno	Sofía García	(10) "Mientes"
Episode 7 (29 October)	Alejandro Sanz	(11) "Who Wants to Live Forever"	Fran Valenzuela	Ian García	(11) "Who Wants to Live Forever"
Episode 7 (29 October)	Alejandro Sanz	(12) "¡Ay, pena, penita, pena!"	Beli	Inés Moraleda	(11) "Who Wants to Live Forever"
Episode 7 (29 October)	Alejandro Sanz	(12) "¡Ay, pena, penita, pena!"	Mara Cruz	Alba Cortés	(12) "¡Ay, pena, penita, pena!"
Episode 7 (29 October)	Malú	(13) "A mi manera"	Besay Pérez	Grupo TNT	(13) "A mi manera"
Episode 7 (29 October)	Malú	(14) "Adoro"	David Bastidas	Makiko Kitago	(13) "A mi manera"
Episode 7 (29 October)	Malú	(14) "Adoro"	Ezequiel Montoya	Franc González	(15) "The Show Must Go On"
Episode 7 (29 October)	Malú	(14) "Adoro"	Jesús Peguero	Luis Jiménez	(15) "The Show Must Go On"
Episode 7 (29 October)	Malú	(14) "Adoro"	Tomasa Peña	Noemí Martínez	(15) "The Show Must Go On"
Episode 7 (29 October)	Malú	(16) "Stand by Me"	Laura Gómez	Carmen Lillo	(16) "Stand by Me"
Episode 7 (29 October)	Malú	(16) "Stand by Me"	Viku	Paula Guasp	(16) "Stand by Me"

== Knockouts ==
=== Phase 1: Knockouts ===
The knockouts round began airing on 6 November. Each coach's seven artists performed, and one is given the fast pass, advancing to the live shows. Out of the other six, three are chosen by their coach to be in the "Red zone". As artists are put in the "red zone", they can be stolen by other coaches. In this case, any artist who was set to be eliminated will take their place.

Knockouts color key
Artist won the Knockout and advanced to the Live shows
Artist was put in the "Red zone" but was stolen by another coach
Artist was put in the "Red zone" and advanced to the Final knockout
Artist lost the Knockout but got a second chance to compete in "The Comeback Stage"
Artist lost the Knockout and was eliminated

Knockouts' results
Episode	Coach	Song	Winner	Other artists	Songs	'Steal' result			
Episode	Coach	Song	Winner	Other artists	Songs	Alborán	Malú	Alejandro	Fonsi
Episode 8 (6 November)	Pablo Alborán	"Million Years Ago"	Inés Manzano	Marina Jiménez	"Te Espero Aquí"	—N/a	—	—	—
Episode 8 (6 November)	Pablo Alborán	"Million Years Ago"	Inés Manzano	Irene Nández	"Sentía"	—N/a	—	—	✔
Episode 8 (6 November)	Pablo Alborán	"Million Years Ago"	Inés Manzano	Toyemi	"Daddy Lessons"	—N/a	—	—	—
Episode 8 (6 November)	Pablo Alborán	"Million Years Ago"	Inés Manzano	Marya Torregrosa	"Vuelves"	—N/a	—	—	—
Episode 8 (6 November)	Pablo Alborán	"Million Years Ago"	Inés Manzano	Julio Benavente	"Marinero"	—N/a	—	✔	—
Episode 8 (6 November)	Pablo Alborán	"Million Years Ago"	Inés Manzano	Yamile Wilson	"Killing Me Softly with His Song"	—N/a	—	—	—
Episode 8 (6 November)	Malú	"Toda una vida"	Ezequiel Montoya	Besay Pérez	"Abriré la puerta"	—	—N/a	Team full	Team full
Episode 8 (6 November)	Malú	"Toda una vida"	Ezequiel Montoya	Laura Gómez	"Entre sobras y sobras me faltas"	—	—N/a	Team full	Team full
Episode 8 (6 November)	Malú	"Toda una vida"	Ezequiel Montoya	Jesús Peguero	"Arráncame"	—	—N/a	Team full	Team full
Episode 8 (6 November)	Malú	"Toda una vida"	Ezequiel Montoya	Viku	"Manos de tijera"	—	—N/a	Team full	Team full
Episode 8 (6 November)	Malú	"Toda una vida"	Ezequiel Montoya	Tomasa Peña	"Historia de un Amor"	—	—N/a	Team full	Team full
Episode 8 (6 November)	Malú	"Toda una vida"	Ezequiel Montoya	David Bastidas	"María de la O"	—	—N/a	Team full	Team full
Episode 9 (13 November)	Luis Fonsi	"Quando m'en vo'"	Diana Larios	Carlos Ángel Valdés	"Evergreen"	—	—	Team full	Team full
Episode 9 (13 November)	Luis Fonsi	"Quando m'en vo'"	Diana Larios	Daniel Gómez	"L.O.V.E."	—	—	Team full	Team full
Episode 9 (13 November)	Luis Fonsi	"Quando m'en vo'"	Diana Larios	Tosh Ebenezer	"Needtobreathe"	—	—	Team full	Team full
Episode 9 (13 November)	Luis Fonsi	"Quando m'en vo'"	Diana Larios	Ainhoa de Asís	"Stand Up for Love"	—	—	Team full	Team full
Episode 9 (13 November)	Luis Fonsi	"Quando m'en vo'"	Diana Larios	Ángel Valera	"Nothing Else Matters"	—	—	Team full	Team full
Episode 9 (13 November)	Luis Fonsi	"Quando m'en vo'"	Diana Larios	Óscar Ettegui	"Pillowtalk"	—	—	Team full	Team full
Episode 9 (13 November)	Alejandro Sanz	"Vision of Love"	Karina Pasian	Carlos Galí	"Desde las alturas"	✔	—	Team full	Team full
Episode 9 (13 November)	Alejandro Sanz	"Vision of Love"	Karina Pasian	Mara Cruz	"Ya no quiero ser"	—	—	Team full	Team full
Episode 9 (13 November)	Alejandro Sanz	"Vision of Love"	Karina Pasian	Alice Reay	"I'd Rather Go Blind"	—	—	Team full	Team full
Episode 9 (13 November)	Alejandro Sanz	"Vision of Love"	Karina Pasian	Miguel Moreno	"Por Fin"	—	—	Team full	Team full
Episode 9 (13 November)	Alejandro Sanz	"Vision of Love"	Karina Pasian	Fran Valenzuela	"El Amor de Mi Vida"	—	✔	Team full	Team full
Episode 9 (13 November)	Alejandro Sanz	"Vision of Love"	Karina Pasian	Beli	"La Despedida"	—	—	Team full	Team full

=== Phase 2: Final Knockouts ===
Each coach has three artists in the "Red zone", who gained a second chance to perform in the Final Knockouts. Joining the fast pass and stolen artists, two contestants will win the final knockout: one chosen by their coach, and the other chosen by the public in the audience.

Final knockout color key
Artist was saved by their coach and advanced to the Live shows
Artist was saved by the audience and advanced to the Live shows
Artist lost the Final knockout and was eliminated

Final Knockouts Results
Episode	Coach	Order	Artist	Song	Result
Episode 10 (20 November)	Pablo Alborán	1	Yamile Wilson	"Lágrimas negras"	Eliminated
Episode 10 (20 November)	Pablo Alborán	2	Toyemi	"I'm Here"	Alborán's choice
Episode 10 (20 November)	Pablo Alborán	3	Marina Jiménez	"Sobreviviré"	Public's Vote
Episode 10 (20 November)	Luis Fonsi	4	Carlos Ángel Valdés	"Say You Won't Let Go"	Fonsi's choice
Episode 10 (20 November)	Luis Fonsi	5	Óscar Ettegui	"I Can't Make You Love Me"	Eliminated
Episode 10 (20 November)	Luis Fonsi	6	Daniel Gómez	"If I Ain't Got You"	Public's Vote
Episode 10 (20 November)	Alejandro Sanz	7	Beli	"Je vais t'aimer"	Alejandro's choice
Episode 10 (20 November)	Alejandro Sanz	8	Mara Cruz	"Pero Me Acuerdo de Ti"	Eliminated
Episode 10 (20 November)	Alejandro Sanz	9	Alice Reay	"Always Remember Us This Way"	Public's Vote
Episode 10 (20 November)	Malú	10	Jesús Peguero	"Ángel caído"	Malú's choice
Episode 10 (20 November)	Malú	11	Tomasa Peña	"Piérdete conmigo"	Eliminated
Episode 10 (20 November)	Malú	12	Besay Pérez	"Nostalgias"	Public's Vote

== The Comeback Stage ==
The Comeback Stage, exclusive to Atresplayer and the show's official YouTube channel, returns this season. In the first round, after failing to turn a chair in the blind auditions, 12 artists had the chance to be selected by the fifth coach Miriam Rodríguez and sang in duels of two. In the second round, one battles' loser and two knockouts' losers were selected by Miriam to sing in duels of three with two of the six winners from the first round. In the third round, the three winners from the second round sing, and two of them advance to the Live Playoffs. One of them will be chosen by Miriam as the "Comeback Stage" winner.

Comeback Stage color key
Artist was chosen to advance into the next round
Artist was eliminated
Artist won "The Comeback Stage" and joined a main competition's team

=== First round ===
Episode (digital)	Coach	Song	Winner	Loser	Song
Episode 1 (17 September)	Miriam Rodríguez	"La mejor version de mi"	Marta Macías	Nora Norman	"Dancing On My Own"
Episode 2 (24 September)	Miriam Rodríguez	"Crazy"	Tyler Middlemiss	Alex Sánchez	"Por primera vez / Vida de rico"
Episode 3 (1 October)	Miriam Rodríguez	"Before You Go"	Christian Ruiz	Sara Askarzadeh	"I Kissed a Girl"
Episode 4 (8 October)	Miriam Rodríguez	"Read All About It"	Aurora y Caridad Napi	Jon Galdós	"Way Down We Go"
Episode 5 (15 October)	Miriam Rodríguez	"Que siempre sea verano"	Pilar y Jesús Suárez	Fran Fernández	"Un día de estos"
Episode 6 (22 October)	Miriam Rodríguez	"I'm Still Standing"	Jokin Doral	Carolin Skerin	"Creep"

=== Second round ===
Episode (digital)	Coach	Song	Winner	Losers	Songs
Episode 7 (29 October)	Miriam Rodríguez	"Lovely"	Tyler Middlemiss	Ian García	"Somebody to Love"
Episode 7 (29 October)	Miriam Rodríguez	"Lovely"	Tyler Middlemiss	Marta Macías	"ADMV"
Episode 8 (6 November)	Miriam Rodríguez	"No saben de ti"	Christian Ruiz	Viku	"Just the Two of Us"
Episode 8 (6 November)	Miriam Rodríguez	"No saben de ti"	Christian Ruiz	Aurora y Caridad Napi	"La Gitana"
Episode 9 (13 November)	Miriam Rodríguez	"The Great Pretender"	Jokin Doral	Tosh Ebenezer	"Arcade"
Episode 9 (13 November)	Miriam Rodríguez	"The Great Pretender"	Jokin Doral	Pilar y Jesús Suárez	"Arráncame"

=== Third round ===
Episode (digital)	Coach	Songs	Winners	Loser	Song
Episode 10 (20 November)	Miriam Rodríguez	"Bound to You"	Tyler Middlemiss	Christian Ruiz	"Sargento de hierro"
Episode 10 (20 November)	Miriam Rodríguez	"Don't Stop Me Now"	Jokin Doral	Christian Ruiz	"Sargento de hierro"

=== Live Playoffs ===
Episode	Coach	Song	Winner	Loser	Song
Episode 11 (27 November)	Miriam Rodríguez	"Perfect"	Tyler Middlemiss	Jokin Doral	"Total Eclipse of the Heart"

== Live shows ==
This season, the live performance shows returned. During the Playoffs and Semifinal, the audience in the studio voted for their favorites to advance into the next round. For the Finale, the public at home eventually was able to vote for the winner.

Live shows color key
Artist was saved by the public and advanced to the semifinal
Artist was saved by their coach and advanced to the semifinal
Artist was eliminated

=== Week 1: Playoffs (27 November) ===
The Playoffs started off with "The Comeback Stage" artists performing. Coach Miriam then chose Tyler Middlemiss as the winner, choosing to join Team Alborán.

Following that, all the participants performed in team order. Even though the show was live, the public at home was not able to vote; the audience in the studio was who voted for one artist, while each coach chose a second artist to advance into the Semifinal.

Top 17 results
Episode	Coach	Order	Artist	Song	Result
Episode 11 (27 November)	Luis Fonsi	1	Carlos Ángel Valdés	"Ya lo sabes"	Fonsi's choice
Episode 11 (27 November)	Luis Fonsi	2	Irene Nández	"Nana triste"	Eliminated
Episode 11 (27 November)	Luis Fonsi	3	Diana Larios	"Nessun dorma"	Public's Vote
Episode 11 (27 November)	Luis Fonsi	4	Daniel Gómez	"Georgia"	Eliminated
Episode 11 (27 November)	Pablo Alborán	5	Toyemi	"Hurt"	Eliminated
Episode 11 (27 November)	Pablo Alborán	6	Carlos Galí	"Forever"	Eliminated
Episode 11 (27 November)	Pablo Alborán	7	Tyler Middlemiss	"Happier"	Eliminated
Episode 11 (27 November)	Pablo Alborán	8	Marina Jiménez	"Sólo Luz"	Alborán's choice
Episode 11 (27 November)	Pablo Alborán	9	Inés Manzano	"One and Only"	Public's Vote
Episode 11 (27 November)	Alejandro Sanz	10	Alice Reay	"Born This Way"	Eliminated
Episode 11 (27 November)	Alejandro Sanz	11	Julio Benavente	"Corazón descalzo"	Public's Vote
Episode 11 (27 November)	Alejandro Sanz	12	Beli	"Drivers License"	Eliminated
Episode 11 (27 November)	Alejandro Sanz	13	Karina Pasian	"Bagdad"	Alejandro's choice
Episode 11 (27 November)	Malú	14	Besay Pérez	"María"	Malú's choice
Episode 11 (27 November)	Malú	15	Fran Valenzuela	"Love Someone"	Eliminated
Episode 11 (27 November)	Malú	16	Jesús Peguero	"Bajo Tus Alas"	Eliminated
Episode 11 (27 November)	Malú	17	Ezequiel Montoya	"A Que No Me Dejas"	Public's Vote

=== Week 2: Semifinal (11 December) ===
The Semifinal started off with all the Top 8 performing a song together. Throughout the rest of the night, the show included each artist's solo performance, each coach performing with their two semifinalists, and each advisor singing with their advised participants. At the end of the episode, the audience voted, choosing four artists to advance to the Finale.

With the advancements of Julio Benavente and Karina Parsian, Alejandro Sanz became the third coach to have more than one artist in the finale, behind Laura Pausini and Antonio Orozco in last season. With the eliminations of Ezequiel Montoya and Besay Pérez, Malú no longer has any more artists on her team, marking the third time which a coach not being represented in the finale, behind Alejandro Sanz and Pablo Lopez in last season.

Top 8 results
Episode	Coach	Order	Artist	Song	Result
Episode 12 (11 December)	Luis Fonsi	1	Carlos Ángel Valdés	"Rise Up"	Public's Vote
Episode 12 (11 December)	Pablo Alborán	2	Inés Manzano	"Diamonds"	Public's Vote
Episode 12 (11 December)	Alejandro Sanz	3	Julio Benavente	"A Puro Dolor"	Public's Vote
Episode 12 (11 December)	Malú	4	Besay Pérez	"Me Enamoré de Ti"	Eliminated
Episode 12 (11 December)	Pablo Alborán	5	Marina Jiménez	"S.O.S."	Eliminated
Episode 12 (11 December)	Alejandro Sanz	6	Karina Parsian	"I Have Nothing"	Public's Vote
Episode 12 (11 December)	Malú	7	Ezequiel Montoya	"Miedo"	Eliminated
Episode 12 (11 December)	Luis Fonsi	8	Diana Larios	"Bring Me to Life"	Eliminated

Non-competition performances
Episode	Order	Performers	Song
Episode 12 (11 December)	12.1	The Semifinalists	"This Is Me"
Episode 12 (11 December)	12.2	Pablo Alborán with his team (Marina and Inés)	"Hablemos de Amor"
Episode 12 (11 December)	12.3	Alejandro Sanz with his team (Karina and Julio)	"Se le Apagó la Luz"
Episode 12 (11 December)	12.4	Malú and her team (Ezequiel and Besay)	"Qué Tarde"
Episode 12 (11 December)	12.5	David Bisbal with Carlos Ángel and Diana	"El ruido"
Episode 12 (11 December)	12.6	María José Llego with Marina and Inés	"La Luz"
Episode 12 (11 December)	12.7	Beret with Ezequiel and Besay	"Te estas olvidando de mí"
Episode 12 (11 December)	12.8	Luis Fonsi with his team (Carlos Ángel and Diana)	"Nada Es Para Siempre"
Episode 12 (11 December)	12.9	Greeicy with Karina and Julio	"Lejos conmigo"

=== Week 3: Grand Final ===
The Grand Final of this season aired on December 18, 2022. In the Grand Final, the four finalists will each perform a duet with a guest and then a solo performance. The public will vote to decide the winner of the season.

The show invited Manuel Carrasco, Vanesa Martín, Pablo López, Niña Pastori, Pastora Soler, Morat and Antonio José to join the artists for duets and other performances. In particular, David Barrull the winner of the second season of La Voz, María Parrado the winner of the first season of La Voz Kids joined to perform. Antonio José was also a contestant from previous season, he was crowned the winner of the third season of La Voz.

Inés Manzano was announced the winner of the eighth season, marking Pablo Alborán's first win as a coach.

Episode	Coach	Artist	Order	Solo	Order	Duet with Guest	Results
Episode 13 (18 December)	Pablo Alborán	Inés Manzano	5	"Easy on Me" by Adele	2	"La fiesta del tutú" (with Vanesa Martín)	Winner
Episode 13 (18 December)	Luis Fonsi	Carlos Ángel Valdés	6	"I'll Never Love Again" by Lady Gaga	1	"Ya no" (with Manuel Carrasco)	Third Place
Episode 13 (18 December)	Alejandro Sanz	Julio Benavente	7	"Imaginame Sin Ti" by Luis Fonsi	4	"Dime quién soy" (with Niña Pastori)	Runner-up
Episode 13 (18 December)	Alejandro Sanz	Karina Pasian	8	"All by Myself" (Céline Dion version)	3	"La niña de la linterna" (with Pablo López)	Fourth Place

Non-competition Performances
Episode	Order	Performers	Song
Episode 13 (18 December)	13.1	The Finalists (Carlos Ángel Valdés, Inés Manzano, Karina Pasian, and Julio Benavente)	"Shivers" by Ed Sheeran
Episode 13 (18 December)	13.2	Pastora Soler, Inés Manzano, and Karina Pasian	"Que hablen de mí" by Pastora Soler
Episode 13 (18 December)	13.3	Antonio José, Morat, Julio Benavente, and Carlos Ángel Valdés	"Lo que hace mi boca"
Episode 13 (18 December)	13.4	David Barrull and María Parrado	"Ahora tú" and "Al alba"

== Elimination chart ==
Artist's info

- Team Alborán
- Team Malú
- Team Alejandro
- Team Fonsi

Result details

- Winner
- Runner-up
- Third place
- Fourth place
- Saved by the public
- Saved by her/his coach
- Eliminated

Live shows results per week
Artists	Week 1	Week 2	Week 3 Finale
Inés Manzano	Safe	Safe	Winner
Julio Benavente	Safe	Safe	Runner-up
Carlos Ángel Valdés	Safe	Safe	Third Place
Karina Pasian	Safe	Safe	Fourth Place
Besay Pérez	Safe	Eliminated	Eliminated (Week 2)
Diana Larios	Safe	Eliminated	Eliminated (Week 2)
Ezequiel Montoya	Safe	Eliminated	Eliminated (Week 2)
Marina Jiménez	Safe	Eliminated	Eliminated (Week 2)
Alice Reay	Eliminated	Eliminated (Week 1)	
Beli	Eliminated	Eliminated (Week 1)	
Carlos Galí	Eliminated	Eliminated (Week 1)	
Daniel Gómez	Eliminated	Eliminated (Week 1)	
Fran Valenzuela	Eliminated	Eliminated (Week 1)	
Irene Nández	Eliminated	Eliminated (Week 1)	
Jesús Peguero	Eliminated	Eliminated (Week 1)	
Toyemi	Eliminated	Eliminated (Week 1)	
Tyler Middlemiss	Eliminated	Eliminated (Week 1)	
