= La Voz (Spanish TV series) season 7 =

Season of television series

La Voz
- Season 7
- Hosted by: Eva González
- Coaches: Alejandro Sanz; Pablo López; Laura Pausini; Antonio Orozco
- Winner: Isaiah Kelly
- Winning coach: Laura Pausini
- Runner-up: Johanna Polvillo

Release
- Original network: Antena 3
- Original release: 11 September – 4 December 2020

Season chronology
- ← Previous; Season 6 Next → Season 8

The seventh season of La Voz started airing on 11 September 2020 on Antena 3. Antonio Orozco and Pablo López returned for their fourth and third season as coaches, respectively. Laura Pausini and Alejandro Sanz, who lasted coached in season three and four, respectively, returned to replace Paulina Rubio and Luis Fonsi.

Isaiah Kelly was announced as the winner of this season, making Laura Pausini's first win. Also, for the first time in The Voice Spanish history, an artist who was chosen for the Comeback Stage went on to win the entire Spanish season

== Coaches ==
La Voz Spain season 7 coaches

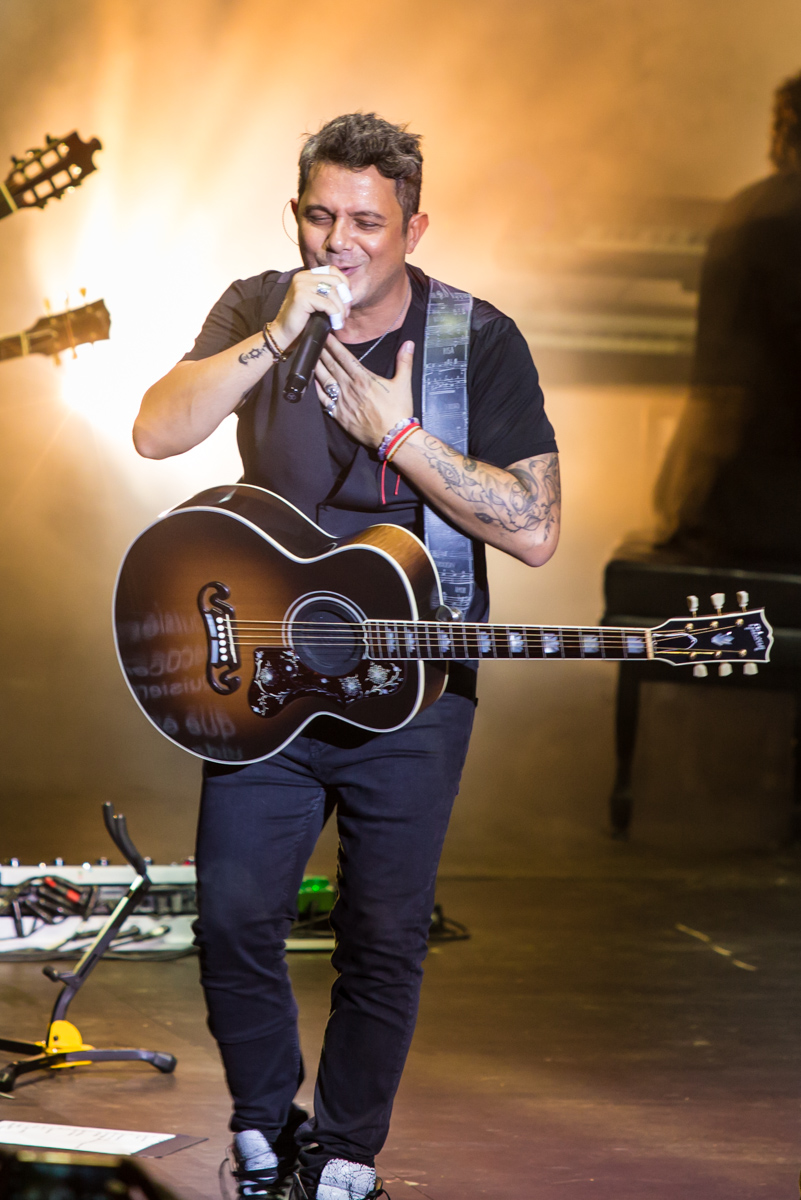
Alejandro Sanz

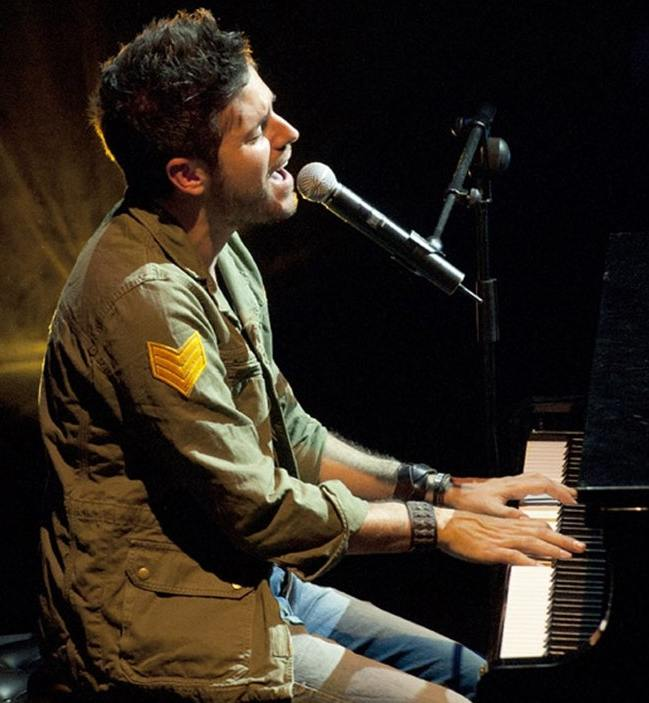
Pablo López

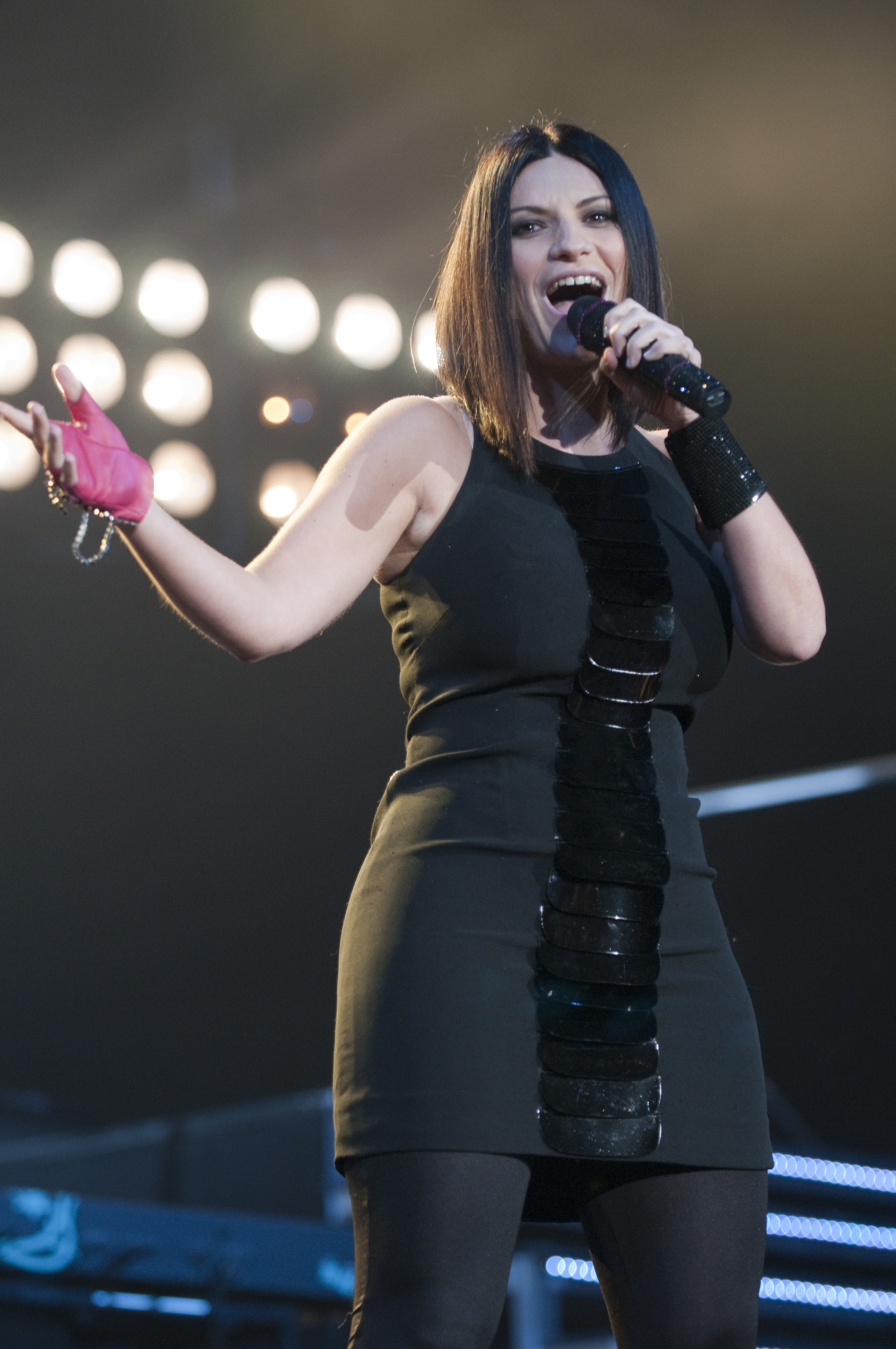
Laura Pausini

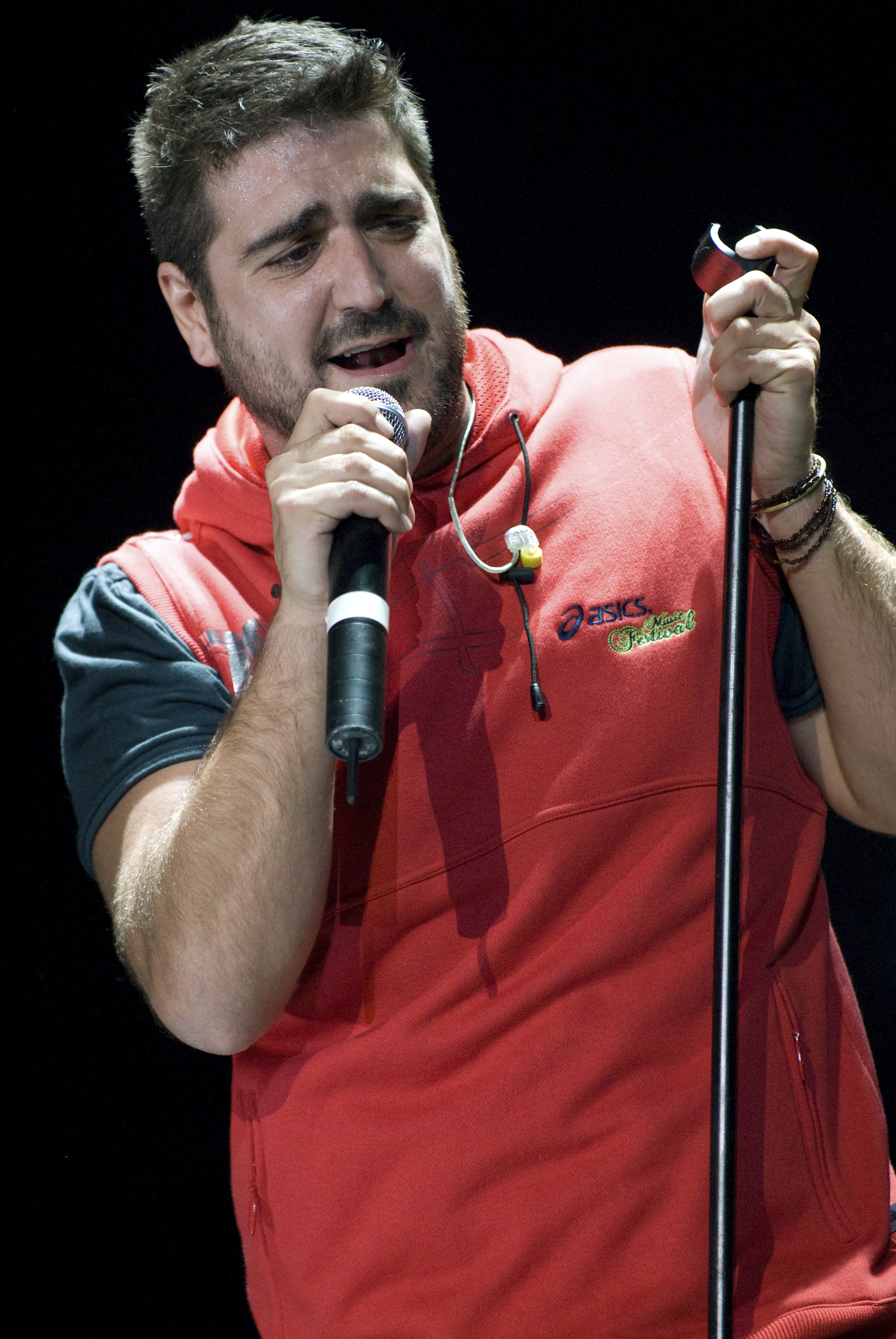
Antonio Orozco

On 8 November 2019, it was announced that Pablo López and Antonio Orozco would remain on the panel for the seventh season and would be joined by returning coaches Laura Pausini and Alejandro Sanz who would replace Paulina Rubio and Luis Fonsi who left the panel due to him coaching La Voz US. This season featured a fifth coach for The Comeback Stage, Miriam Rodriguez who selected twelve contestants who did not get a chair turn in the Blind auditions.

The advisors for this season include: argentinan singer Tini Stoessel for Team Alejandro, colombian singer Sebastián Yatra for Team Pablo, mexican singer Carlos Rivera for Team Laura, and spain singer Mala Rodríguez for Team Antonio.

== Teams ==
Color key

- Main Competition
- Winner
- Runner-up
- Third place
- Eliminated in the Semifinal
- Eliminated in the Playoffs
- Eliminated in Battles
- Eliminated but selected to participate in The Comeback Stage
- Stolen in the Knockouts
- Eliminated in the Knockouts
- The Comeback Stage
- Joined another team
- Eliminated in the Playoffs
- Eliminated in the Third Round
- Eliminated in the Second Round
- Eliminated in the First Round

| Coaches | Top 72 Artists | | | | | |
|---|---|---|---|---|---|---|
| Alejandro Sanz | | | | | | |
| Alejandro Sanz | Adam Ainouz | Rafael Ruiz | Haizea Gómez | Marta Santos | Virginia Elósegui | |
| Alejandro Sanz | ~~Isaiah Kelly~~ | ~~Mar Rodriguez~~ | ~~Dayana Emma~~ | ~~Gonzalo Alhambra~~ | ~~Juan José Alba~~ | ~~Iván Feria~~ |
| Alejandro Sanz | Rocío Silva | Tony Weaver | Araceli Campillos | Sara Fuente | Michael Harding | Yaneisy Martínez |
| Pablo López | | | | | | |
| Pablo López | Miguelichi | Roger Padrós | Dayana Emma | Antonio Soto | Iván Feria | |
| Pablo López | ~~Teresa Palomar~~ | ~~Marta Santos~~ | ~~Sergio Chaves~~ | ~~Virginia Elósegui~~ | Aisha Fay | Fabio Laseca |
| Pablo López | Manuela Cabello | Lisardo Silva | Mireia Ortiz | 22 Dúo | Daniela Pobega | Rocío Acebedo |
| Laura Pausini | | | | | | |
| Laura Pausini | Isaiah Kelly | Paula Espinosa | Carlota Palacios | Juan José Alba | Pilar Bogado | Luis Ángel Vizcarra |
| Laura Pausini | Cristie | Carla Sánchez | Julia Moya | Southside | Alejandro Frey | Carolina Gómez |
| Laura Pausini | Cristina Montoya | Thania Hill | Aixa Romay | Lilian W. Hergueta | Marcos Andrés | Mireia Cuesta |
| Antonio Orozco | | | | | | |
| Antonio Orozco | Johanna Polvillo | Curricé | Antonio Villar | ~~Sergio Chaves~~ | Gonzalo Alhambra | |
| Antonio Orozco | ~~Pilar Bogado~~ | Moneiba Hidalgo | Beatriz Alcoba | Cristian Segura | María Cortés | Noemi Delavennat |
| Antonio Orozco | Rocio Hernández | Swingstars | Dolores Berg | Chiara Rossi | Marcos Bartolomé | Sevine Abi Aad |
| Miriam Rodríguez | | | | | | |
| Miriam Rodríguez | ~~Isaiah Kelly~~ | Sergio Chaves | Guillem Gené | Sabela Trigo | | |
| Miriam Rodríguez | Rufino Oliva | Betty Akna | Gema Contreras | Teresa Palomar | Mar Rodríguez | Melo |
| Miriam Rodríguez | Alba Pérez | Patricia Kaninga | Carmen Saborido | Samuel García | Ettore Zucchet | Julio Roldán |
Note: Italicized names are stolen artists (names struck through within former teams). The underlined name is "The Comeback Stage" winner who joined another team of their choosing (name struck through within former team).

== Blind auditions ==
In the Blind Auditions, each coach had to complete their teams with 15 contestants. Each coach had three Blocks to prevent another of the coaches from getting a contestant. Twelve participants who got no chair turn were chosen to participate on The Comeback Stage.

Color key
| ✔ | Coach pressed "QUIERO TU VOZ" ("I Want your Voice") button< |
| | Artist defaulted to a coach's team |
| | Artist elected a coach's team |
| | Artist was eliminated and was not invited back for "The Comeback Stage" |
| | Artist was eliminated, but got a second chance to compete in "The Comeback Stage" |
| ✘ | Coach pressed the "QUIERO TU VOZ" button, but was blocked by Alejandro from getting the artist |
| ✘ | Coach pressed the "QUIERO TU VOZ" button, but was blocked by Pablo from getting the artist |
| ✘ | Coach pressed the "QUIERO TU VOZ" button, but was blocked by Laura from getting the artist |
| ✘ | Coach pressed the "QUIERO TU VOZ" button, but was blocked by Antonio from getting the artist |

=== Episode 1 (11 September) ===
At the beginning of the episode, the coaches performed each other songs. Alejandro Sanz sang "Estoy hecho de pedacitos de ti", Pablo López sang "Viveme", Laura Pausini sang "El Patio" and Antonio Orozco sang "No Tengo Nada".

| Order | Artist | Age | Song | Coach's and artist's choices | | | |
| Order | Artist | Age | Song | Alejandro | Pablo | Laura | Antonio |
|---|---|---|---|---|---|---|---|
| 1 | Araceli Campillos | 25 | "Requiem" | ✔ | – | – | ✔ |
| 2 | Mar Rodríguez | 30 | "Eso" | ✔ | ✔ | – | ✔ |
| 3 | Mercedes Ferrer | 57 | "Vivimos siempre juntos" | – | – | – | – |
| 4 | Marcos Bartolomé | 27 | "Cry Me a River" | – | – | ✔ | ✔ |
| 5 | Cristie | 41 | "All the Man That I Need" | – | – | ✔ | ✔ |
| 6 | Francisco Cuenca | 34 | "Por Debajo de la Mesa" | – | – | – | – |
| 7 | Isaiah Kelly | 27 | "Roxanne (Version Reggae)" | ✔ | ✔ | ✔ | ✔ |
| 8 | Marta Santos | 26 | "Aunque tú no lo sepas" | ✘ | ✔ | ✔ | ✔ |
| 9 | Haizea Gómez | 29 | "Con las Ganas" | ✔ | – | ✔ | ✔ |
| 10 | Johanna Polvillo | 35 | "Open Arms" | – | – | ✔ | ✔ |
| 11 | Guillem Gené | 32 | "Something in the Way She Moves" | – | – | – | – |
| 12 | Gonzalo Alhambra | 23 | "Pienso en tu mirá" | ✔ | ✔ | ✔ | ✔ |
| 13 | Julio Roldán | 32 | "Menos mal" | – | – | – | – |
| 14 | Southside | 29–43 | "My Girl" | – | – | ✔ | ✔ |

=== Episode 2 (18 September) ===
| Order | Artist | Age | Song | Coach's and artist's choices | | | |
| Order | Artist | Age | Song | Alejandro | Pablo | Laura | Antonio |
|---|---|---|---|---|---|---|---|
| 1 | Miguelichi López | 24 | "Lágrimas Negras" | ✘ | ✔ | ✔ | ✔ |
| 2 | Iván Feria | 21 | "Desencuentro" | ✔ | ✘ | ✔ | ✔ |
| 3 | Carolina Gómez | 19 | "Remember Me" | – | – | ✔ | ✔ |
| 4 | Ettore Zucchet | 36 | "Maggie May" | – | – | – | – |
| 5 | Noemi Delavennat | 30 | "Padam, padam..." | ✔ | ✔ | ✔ | ✔ |
| 6 | Manuel Cabello | 37 | "Y sin embargo" | – | ✔ | – | ✔ |
| 7 | Rocio Hernández | 18 | "Homeless" | – | – | ✔ | ✔ |
| 8 | Beatriz Alcoba | 38 | "Mad about the boy" | – | – | – | ✔ |
| 9 | Rafael Ruiz | 28 | "La quiero a morir" | ✔ | – | – | ✔ |
| 10 | Antonio Soto | 34 | "Just the two of us" | ✔ | ✔ | ✔ | ✔ |
| 11 | Melo | 22 | "La Carretera" | – | – | – | – |
| 12 | María Cortés | 26 | "Cuando Nadie Me Ve" | – | – | – | ✔ |
| 13 | Ken Baldwin | 52 | "I've Got You Under My Skin" | – | – | – | – |
| 14 | Lilian W. Hergueta | 33 | "Somebody Else's Guy" | – | – | ✔ | – |

=== Episode 3 (25 September) ===
| Order | Artist | Age | Song | Coach's and artist's choices | | | |
| Order | Artist | Age | Song | Alejandro | Pablo | Laura | Antonio |
|---|---|---|---|---|---|---|---|
| 1 | Carlota Palacios | 21 | "Catalina" | ✔ | ✔ | ✔ | ✔ |
| 2 | Roger Padrós | 22 | "All I Want" | – | ✔ | ✔ | – |
| 3 | Gema Contreras | 27 | "Nana del Cabello Grande" | – | – | – | – |
| 4 | Rocío Silva | 29 | "90 minutos" | ✔ | ✔ | – | ✔ |
| 5 | Renata da Silva | 41 | "I'm Every Woman" | – | – | – | – |
| 6 | Swingstars | 36, 43, 44 | "Esta tarde vi llover" | – | ✔ | – | ✔ |
| 7 | Dayana Emma^{1} | 21 | "Is This Love" | – | – | – | – |
| 8 | Alejandro Frey | 28 | "Redemption Song" | – | ✔ | ✔ | – |
| 9 | Paula Espinosa | 19 | "More Than Words" | ✔ | ✘ | ✔ | – |
| 10 | Virginia Elósegui | 28 | "No Tengo Nada" | ✘ | ✔ | ✔ | – |
| 11 | Samuel García | 21 | "Sweet Child o' Mine" | – | – | – | – |
| 12 | Pilar Bogado | 20 | "La Mudanza" | ✘ | ✔ | – | ✔ |
| 13 | Mónica Torremocha | 37 | "End of the Road" | – | – | – | – |
| 14 | Dolores Berg | 39 | "Lucía" | – | ✔ | – | ✔ |

=== Episode 4 (2 October) ===
| Order | Artist | Age | Song | Coach's and artist's choices | | | |
| Order | Artist | Age | Song | Alejandro | Pablo | Laura | Antonio |
|---|---|---|---|---|---|---|---|
| 1 | Sevine Abi Aad | 39 | "Hymne à l'amour" | – | ✔ | ✔ | ✔ |
| 2 | 22 Dúo (Marina & Oriol) | 29 & 28 | "More Than Words" | – | ✔ | ✔ | – |
| 3 | Carla Sánchez | 33 | "Black Velvet" | – | – | ✔ | – |
| 4 | Carmen Saborido | 33 | "Entra en mi vida" | – | – | – | – |
| 5 | Lisandro Silva | 24 | "Un ramito de violetas" | – | ✔ | ✔ | – |
| 6 | Aaron Paul | 42 | "Hello" | – | – | – | – |
| 7 | Yaneisy Martínez | 33 | "Who's Lovin' You" | ✔ | ✔ | ✔ | ✘ |
| 8 | Dayana Emma^{1} | 21 | "Como fue" | ✔ | ✔ | – | ✔ |
| 9 | Teresa Palomer | 19 | "Querría" | – | ✔ | ✔ | ✔ |
| 10 | Chiara Rossi | 27 | "Purple Rain" | – | – | – | ✔ |
| 11 | Uxoa Eusebio | 27 | "Memory" | – | – | – | – |
| 12 | Aisha Fay | 29 | "Joyful, Joyful" | – | ✔ | – | – |
| 13 | Rufino Oliva | 42 | "Espera un Momento" | – | – | – | – |
| 14 | Tony Weaver | 26 | "All of Me" | ✔ | – | – | – |

=== Episode 5 (9 October) ===
| Order | Artist | Age | Song | Coach's and artist's choices | | | |
| Order | Artist | Age | Song | Alejandro | Pablo | Laura | Antonio |
|---|---|---|---|---|---|---|---|
| 1 | Thania Hill | 32 | "Lágrimas negras" | ✘ | ✔ | ✔ | ✔ |
| 2 | Juan José Alba | 33 | "La Llorona" | ✔ | ✔ | ✘ | ✔ |
| 3 | Melisa & Ludovico | 25 & 29 | "When You Say Nothing at All" | – | – | – | – |
| 4 | Michael Harding | 46 | "Mustang Sally" | ✔ | – | – | – |
| 5 | Cristina Montoya | 24 | "Back to Black" | – | – | ✔ | – |
| 6 | Patricia Kaninga | 19 | "Freedom" | – | – | – | – |
| 7 | Cristian Segura | 29 | "Flor de Lis" | ✘ | ✔ | – | ✔ |
| 8 | Moneiba Hidalgo | 37 | "I Put a Spell on You" | ✔ | ✔ | – | ✔ |
| 9 | Sabela Trigo | 19 | "Hay Algo En Mí" | – | – | – | – |
| 10 | Antonio Villar | 35 | "La calle de los lunares" | – | ✔ | ✔ | ✔ |
| 11 | Rocío Acebedo | 32 | "Remolino" | – | ✔ | – | – |
| 12 | Aixa Romay | 36 | "The Best" | – | – | ✔ | – |
| 13 | Leora Glasgow | 38 | "Miss Celie's Blues" | – | – | – | – |
| 14 | Mireia Ortiz | 35 | "Contigo en la Distancia" | – | ✔ | – | – |

=== Episode 6 (16 October) ===
| Order | Artist | Age | Song | Coach's and artist's choices | | | |
| Order | Artist | Age | Song | Alejandro | Pablo | Laura | Antonio |
|---|---|---|---|---|---|---|---|
| 1 | Adam Ainouz | 25 | "I'm Not the Only One" | ✔ | ✔ | ✔ | ✔ |
| 2 | Julia Moya | 28 | "Quando me'n vo'" | – | – | ✔ | ✘ |
| 3 | Betty Akna | 39 | "Been Around the World" | – | – | – | – |
| 4 | Curricé | 31 | "Radioactive" | ✔ | – | ✘ | ✔ |
| 5 | José Manuel Carraaquilla | 36 | "Se nos rompió el amor" | – | – | – | Team full |
| 6 | Sara Fuente | 22 | "Best Part" | ✔ | – | ✔ | Team full |
| 7 | Fabio Laseca | 23 | "La Flaca" | Team full | ✔ | ✔ | Team full |
| 8 | Sergio Chaves | 22 | "La Llorona" | Team full | ✔ | ✔ | Team full |
| 9 | Mireia Cuesta | 27 | "Smile" | Team full | – | ✔ | Team full |
| 10 | Marcos Andrés | 49 | "Como un burro amarrado en la puerta del baile" | Team full | ✔ | ✔ | Team full |
| 11 | Natán Zubillaga | 33 | "Imagíname sin ti" | Team full | – | – | Team full |
| 12 | Luis Ángel Vizcarra | 20 | "Earned It" | Team full | ✔ | ✔ | Team full |
| 13 | Alba Pérez | 24 | "Algo contigo" | Team full | – | Team full | Team full |
| 14 | Daniela Pobega | 28 | "One Night Only" | Team full | ✔ | Team full | Team full |

=== Notes ===
- ^1 In episode 3, the coaches gave Dayana Emma a second chance to perform a new song.
- ^2 Laura saw Alejandro blocking her and, therefore, she didn't try to press her button. The block didn't count and Alejandro got the chance to block again.

== The Knockouts ==
This season, the rules for "Los Asaltos" changed. Each coach had to make three groups of five artists from their team to compete in a Knockout. At the end of all five performances, their coach could only advance with one of the artists. But, each coach has two steals which they can use to steal losing artists from other teams. Coaches received help from their advisors: Tini Stoessel for Team Alejandro, Sebastián Yatra for Team Pablo, Carlos Rivera for Team Laura, and Mala Rodríguez for Team Antonio. At the end of this round, each coach advanced with five artists into the Battles.

Color key
| Artist won the Knockout and advanced to the Battles |
| Artist lost the Knockout but was stolen by another coach and advanced to the Battles |
| Artist lost the Knockout but got a second chance to compete in "The Comeback Stage" |
| Artist lost the Knockout and was eliminated |

| Episode | Coach | Order | Song | Winner | Losers | Song | 'Steal' result | | | |
| Episode | Coach | Order | Song | Winner | Losers | Song | Alejandro | Pablo | Laura | Antonio |
|---|---|---|---|---|---|---|---|---|---|---|
| Episode 7 (23 October) | Pablo López | 1 | "Wicked Game" | Roger Padrós | Virginia Elósegui | "Casi Te Rozo" | ✔ | —N/a | — | — |
| Episode 7 (23 October) | Pablo López | 1 | "Wicked Game" | Roger Padrós | Rocío Acebedo | "Entre otros cien" | — | —N/a | — | — |
| Episode 7 (23 October) | Pablo López | 1 | "Wicked Game" | Roger Padrós | Sergio Chaves | "Terriblemente Cruel" | — | —N/a | — | ✔ |
| Episode 7 (23 October) | Pablo López | 1 | "Wicked Game" | Roger Padrós | Daniela Pobega | "If I Were a Boy" | — | —N/a | — | — |
| Episode 7 (23 October) | Alejandro Sanz | 2 | "Tuyo" | Haizea Gómez | Yaneisy Martínez | "Wild Horses" | —N/a | — | — | — |
| Episode 7 (23 October) | Alejandro Sanz | 2 | "Tuyo" | Haizea Gómez | Mar Rodríguez | "Envidia" | —N/a | — | — | — |
| Episode 7 (23 October) | Alejandro Sanz | 2 | "Tuyo" | Haizea Gómez | Michael Harding | "Let's Get It On" | —N/a | — | — | — |
| Episode 7 (23 October) | Alejandro Sanz | 2 | "Tuyo" | Haizea Gómez | Iván Feria | "Por fin" | —N/a | ✔ | ✔ | ✔ |
| Episode 7 (23 October) | Antonio Orozco | 3 | "Leave a Light On" | Curricé | Dolores Berg | "Piensa en mí" | — | — | — | —N/a |
| Episode 7 (23 October) | Antonio Orozco | 3 | "Leave a Light On" | Curricé | Sevine Abi Aad | "Les moulins mon coeur" | — | — | — | —N/a |
| Episode 7 (23 October) | Antonio Orozco | 3 | "Leave a Light On" | Curricé | Chiara Rossi | "You Know I'm No Good" | — | — | — | —N/a |
| Episode 7 (23 October) | Antonio Orozco | 3 | "Leave a Light On" | Curricé | Marcos Bartolomé | "Come Fly with Me" | — | — | — | —N/a |
| Episode 7 (23 October) | Laura Pausini | 4 | "Creep" | Carlota Palacios | Aixa Romay | "A Natural Woman" | — | — | —N/a | — |
| Episode 7 (23 October) | Laura Pausini | 4 | "Creep" | Carlota Palacios | Mireia Cuesta | "La Vie en rose" | — | — | —N/a | — |
| Episode 7 (23 October) | Laura Pausini | 4 | "Creep" | Carlota Palacios | Lilian W. Hergueta | "The Joke" | — | — | —N/a | — |
| Episode 7 (23 October) | Laura Pausini | 4 | "Creep" | Carlota Palacios | Marcos Andrés | "Come Fly with Me" | — | — | —N/a | — |
| Episode 8 (30 October) | Laura Pausini | 1 | "The Scientist" | Paula Espinosa | Alejandro Frey | "Come Together" | — | — | —N/a | — |
| Episode 8 (30 October) | Laura Pausini | 1 | "The Scientist" | Paula Espinosa | Thania Hill | "Recuerdame" | — | — | —N/a | — |
| Episode 8 (30 October) | Laura Pausini | 1 | "The Scientist" | Paula Espinosa | Cristina Montoya | "Crazy in Love" | — | — | —N/a | — |
| Episode 8 (30 October) | Laura Pausini | 1 | "The Scientist" | Paula Espinosa | Carolina Gómez | "Tell Me You Love Me" | — | — | —N/a | — |
| Episode 8 (30 October) | Alejandro Sanz | 2 | "En El Lago" | Rafael Ruiz | Araceli Campillos | "Algo Especial en Ti" | —N/a | — | — | — |
| Episode 8 (30 October) | Alejandro Sanz | 2 | "En El Lago" | Rafael Ruiz | Gonzalo Alhambra | "Qué bonita la vida" | —N/a | — | — | ✔ |
| Episode 8 (30 October) | Alejandro Sanz | 2 | "En El Lago" | Rafael Ruiz | Sara Fuente | "Goodbyes" | —N/a | — | — | — |
| Episode 8 (30 October) | Alejandro Sanz | 2 | "En El Lago" | Rafael Ruiz | Juan José Alba | "No te pude retener" | —N/a | — | ✔ | — |
| Episode 8 (30 October) | Antonio Orozco | 3 | "Vision of Love" | Johanna Polvillo | Rocio Hernández | "I'll Never Love Again" | — | — | — | Team full |
| Episode 8 (30 October) | Antonio Orozco | 3 | "Vision of Love" | Johanna Polvillo | Pilar Bogado | "Vencer al amor" | ✔ | — | ✔ | Team full |
| Episode 8 (30 October) | Antonio Orozco | 3 | "Vision of Love" | Johanna Polvillo | Swingstars | "Bohemian Rhapsody" | — | — | — | Team full |
| Episode 8 (30 October) | Antonio Orozco | 3 | "Vision of Love" | Johanna Polvillo | Noemi Delavennant | "Quizás, Quizás, Quizás" | — | — | — | Team full |
| Episode 8 (30 October) | Pablo López | 4 | "Gravity" | Antonio Soto | Mireia Ortiz | "Who's Loving You" | — | — | Team full | Team full |
| Episode 8 (30 October) | Pablo López | 4 | "Gravity" | Antonio Soto | 22 Dúo | "Shape of You" | — | — | Team full | Team full |
| Episode 8 (30 October) | Pablo López | 4 | "Gravity" | Antonio Soto | Lisardo Silva | "Devuélveme la Vida" | — | — | Team full | Team full |
| Episode 8 (30 October) | Pablo López | 4 | "Gravity" | Antonio Soto | Teresa Palomar | "Canela en Rama" | — | — | Team full | Team full |
| Episode 9 (6 November) | Alejandro Sanz | 1 | "Lay Me Down" | Adam Ainouz | Isaiah Kelly | "Hotel California" | —N/a | — | Team full | Team full |
| Episode 9 (6 November) | Alejandro Sanz | 1 | "Lay Me Down" | Adam Ainouz | Dayana Emma | "¿Dónde está la vida?" | —N/a | ✔ | Team full | Team full |
| Episode 9 (6 November) | Alejandro Sanz | 1 | "Lay Me Down" | Adam Ainouz | Rocío Silva | "Ya No Quiero Ser" | —N/a | — | Team full | Team full |
| Episode 9 (6 November) | Alejandro Sanz | 1 | "Lay Me Down" | Adam Ainouz | Tony Weaver | "Can't Get Enough of Your Love, Babe" | —N/a | — | Team full | Team full |
| Episode 9 (6 November) | Pablo López | 2 | "El Lado Oscuro" | Miguelichi | Aisha Fay | "This is Me" | — | Team full | Team full | Team full |
| Episode 9 (6 November) | Pablo López | 2 | "El Lado Oscuro" | Miguelichi | Fabio Laseca | "No puedo vivir sin ti" | — | Team full | Team full | Team full |
| Episode 9 (6 November) | Pablo López | 2 | "El Lado Oscuro" | Miguelichi | Manuela Cabello | "No Hay Más" | — | Team full | Team full | Team full |
| Episode 9 (6 November) | Pablo López | 2 | "El Lado Oscuro" | Miguelichi | Marta Santos | "Garganta con arena" | ✔ | Team full | Team full | Team full |
| Episode 9 (6 November) | Laura Pausini | 3 | "Mi historia entre tus dedos" | Luis Ángel Vizcarra | Cristie | "I Say a Little Prayer" | Team full | Team full | Team full | Team full |
| Episode 9 (6 November) | Laura Pausini | 3 | "Mi historia entre tus dedos" | Luis Ángel Vizcarra | Carla Sánchez | "Don't Stop Believin'" | Team full | Team full | Team full | Team full |
| Episode 9 (6 November) | Laura Pausini | 3 | "Mi historia entre tus dedos" | Luis Ángel Vizcarra | Julia Moya | "Lascia ch'io pianga" | Team full | Team full | Team full | Team full |
| Episode 9 (6 November) | Laura Pausini | 3 | "Mi historia entre tus dedos" | Luis Ángel Vizcarra | Southside | "Mirrors" | Team full | Team full | Team full | Team full |
| Episode 9 (6 November) | Antonio Orozco | 4 | "Medite-rráneo" | Antonio Villar | Moneiba Hidalgo | "Set Fire to the Rain" | Team full | Team full | Team full | Team full |
| Episode 9 (6 November) | Antonio Orozco | 4 | "Medite-rráneo" | Antonio Villar | Beatriz Alcoba | "I Never Loved a Man" | Team full | Team full | Team full | Team full |
| Episode 9 (6 November) | Antonio Orozco | 4 | "Medite-rráneo" | Antonio Villar | Cristian Segura | "Se dejaba llevar por ti" | Team full | Team full | Team full | Team full |
| Episode 9 (6 November) | Antonio Orozco | 4 | "Medite-rráneo" | Antonio Villar | María Cortés | "Aire de molino" | Team full | Team full | Team full | Team full |

== The battles ==
This round started with the Top 20 and each coach had five contestants. Each one granted an artist the "Fast Pass", who advanced to the Playoffs without battling a team member. The remaining artists battled another team member and only one was chosen to advance. For this round, the advisors from the Knockouts were also present. The "Fast Pass" artist and the two artists from each team who won their battle advanced to the Playoffs.

Color key
| Artist received the Fast Pass and advanced to the Playoffs |
| Artist won the Battle and advanced to the Playoffs |
| Artist lost the Battle but got a second chance to compete in "The Comeback Stage" |
| Artist lost the Battle and was eliminated |

Fast Pass
| Coach | Artist |
|---|---|
| Alejandro Sanz | Rafael Ruiz |
| Pablo López | Dayana Emma |
| Laura Pausini | Paula Espinosa |
| Antonio Orozco | Antonio Villar |

Battle performances
| Episode | Coach | Order | Winner | Song | Loser |
|---|---|---|---|---|---|
| Episode 10 (13 November) | Alejandro Sanz | 1 | Adam Ainouz | "The Blower's Daughter" | Virginia Elósegui |
| Episode 10 (13 November) | Antonio Orozco | 2 | Curricé | "Lobos" | Sergio Chaves |
| Episode 10 (13 November) | Laura Pausini | 3 | Carlota Palacios | "Señorita" | Luis Ángel Vizcarra |
| Episode 10 (13 November) | Pablo López | 4 | Miguelichi | "Para que tú no llores'" | Iván Feria |
| Episode 10 (13 November) | Alejandro Sanz | 5 | Haizea Gómez | "Quisiera Ser" | Marta Santos |
| Episode 10 (13 November) | Antonio Orozco | 6 | Johanna Polvillo | "What You're Made Of" | Gonzalo Alhambra |
| Episode 10 (13 November) | Pablo López | 7 | Roger Padrós | "Hijo de la Luna" | Antonio Soto |
| Episode 10 (13 November) | Laura Pausini | 8 | Juan José Alba | "Perdóname" | Pilar Bogado |

Non-competition performances
| Order | Performers | Song |
|---|---|---|
| 1 | Top 20 (minus Fast Pass artists) | "My Voice" |

== The Comeback Stage ==
For this season, the show added a brand new phase of competition called The Comeback Stage that was exclusive to Atresplayer and show's official YouTube channel. After failing to turn a chair in the blind auditions, artists had the chance to be selected by fifth coach Miriam Rodríguez to become a member of her team.

- In the first phase (which was part of the main show's Blind Auditions segment), after every audition night, the coach chose two no-chair turn artists to compete against each other. Coach Miriam then had the task to choose one to advance into the next round.
- In the second round (which was part of the main show's Knockouts segment), the coach had to create a 3-people Knockout with two of her Round One winners, and one artist she stole from the main competition that night.
- In the third phase, Round Two's winners battled it out and only one won going through to the main competition's Playoffs.
- In round four, Miriam chose an eliminated artist from the main competition's Battles to go into the Playoffs and compete against Round Three's winner.

=== First round (battles) ===
Colour key
| Artist was chosen to advance into Round Two |
| Artist was not chosen to advance into Round Two |

| Episode (Digital) | Coach | Song | Winner | Loser | Song |
|---|---|---|---|---|---|
| Episode 1 (11 September) | Miriam Rodríguez | "Lost on You" | Guillem Gené | Julio Roldán | "Por Ti Estaré" |
| Episode 2 (18 September) | Miriam Rodríguez | "Te Vi Venir" | Melo | Ettore Zucchet | "These Boots Are Made for Walkin'" |
| Episode 3 (25 September) | Miriam Rodríguez | "Te Quiero Mucho" | Gema Contretas | Samuel García | "Miedo" |
| Episode 4 (2 October) | Miriam Rodríguez | "El Mundo" | Rufino Oliva | Carmen Saborido | "Abrázame" |
| Episode 5 (9 October) | Miriam Rodríguez | "Primavera anticipada" | Sabela Trigo | Patricia Kaninga | "I'm Going Down" |
| Episode 6 (16 October) | Miriam Rodríguez | "Killing Me Softly with His Song" | Betty Akba | Alba Pérez | "Con Los Años Que Me Quedan" |

=== Second round (knockouts) ===
Colour key
| Artist was chosen to advance into Round Three |
| Artists were not chosen to advance into Round Three |

| Episode (Digital) | Coach | Song | Winner | Losers | Song |
|---|---|---|---|---|---|
| Episode 7 (23 October) | Miriam Rodríguez | "Believer" | Guillem Gené | Mar Rodríguez | "Confesíon" |
| Episode 7 (23 October) | Miriam Rodríguez | "Believer" | Guillem Gené | Melo | "Mientes" |
| Episode 8 (30 October) | Miriam Rodríguez | "The Climb" | Sabela Trigo | Teresa Palomar | "Un Rayo Verde" |
| Episode 8 (30 October) | Miriam Rodríguez | "The Climb" | Sabela Trigo | Gema Contreras | "La quiero a morir" |
| Episode 9 (4 November) | Miriam Rodríguez | "Grenade" | Isaiah Kelly | Rufino Oliva | "Durmiendo sola" |
| Episode 9 (4 November) | Miriam Rodríguez | "Grenade" | Isaiah Kelly | Betty Akna | "Ain't Nobody" |

=== Third round (the finale) ===
Colour key
| Artist won the Finals and advanced to the main competition's Playoffs |
| Artist was eliminated |

| Episode (Digital) | Coach | Song | Winner | Losers | Song |
|---|---|---|---|---|---|
| Episode 10 (11 November) | Miriam Rodriguez | "It's a Man's Man's Man's World" | Isaiah Kelly | Guillem Gené | "Fix You" |
| Episode 10 (11 November) | Miriam Rodriguez | "It's a Man's Man's Man's World" | Isaiah Kelly | Sabela Trigo | "Quiero Verte" |

=== Fourth round (playoffs) ===
Colour key
| Artist won The Comeback Stage and joined a new team |
| Artist was eliminated |

| Episode | Coach | Song | Winner | Loser | Song |
|---|---|---|---|---|---|
| Episode 11 (20 November) | Miriam Rodríguez | "Walking on the Moon" | Isaiah Kelly | Sergio Chaves | "Pausa" |

== Final phase ==
This season, the final phase was pre-recorded, instead of live, due to the ongoing COVID-19 pandemic. During the Playoffs and Semifinal, the public present in the studio voted for their favorites to advance into the next round. In the Finale, they eventually pick who wins the season.

=== Week 1: Playoffs (20 November) ===
The Playoffs started with each team singing a song of their coach. Then, "The Comeback Stage" artists performed and Kelly won with majority of votes from the public; he decided to join Team Laura. Finally, the contestants performed by teams; the public voted for one artist, while each coach chose a second artist to advance into the Semifinal.

Colour key
| Artist won The Comeback Stage and joined a new team |
| Artist was saved by the public and advanced to the Semifinal |
| Artist was saved by his/her coach and advanced to the Semifinal |
| Artist was eliminated |

The Comeback Stage Playoffs
| Episode | Coach | Order | Artist | Song | Result |
|---|---|---|---|---|---|
| Episode 11 (20 November) | Miriam Rodríguez | 1 | Sergio Chaves | "Pausa" | Eliminated |
| Episode 11 (20 November) | Miriam Rodríguez | 2 | Isaiah Kelly | "Walking on the Moon" | Joined Team Laura |

Main Playoffs
| Episode | Coach | Order | Artist | Song | Result |
|---|---|---|---|---|---|
| Episode 11 (20 November) | Laura Pausini | 1 | Isaiah Kelly | "Walking on the Moon" | Public's vote |
| Episode 11 (20 November) | Laura Pausini | 2 | Carlota Palacios | "Don't Start Now" | Eliminated |
| Episode 11 (20 November) | Laura Pausini | 3 | Paula Espinosa | "Corazón Partío" | Laura's choice |
| Episode 11 (20 November) | Laura Pausini | 4 | Juan José Alba | "Sólo Luz" | Eliminated |
| Episode 11 (20 November) | Alejandro Sanz | 5 | Haizea Gómez | "Me Quedo Contigo" | Eliminated |
| Episode 11 (20 November) | Alejandro Sanz | 6 | Adam Ainouz | "Oye" | Alejandro's choice |
| Episode 11 (20 November) | Alejandro Sanz | 7 | Rafael Ruiz | "Mi Marciana" | Public's vote |
| Episode 11 (20 November) | Pablo López | 8 | Dayana Emma | "Tengo un Trato" | Eliminated |
| Episode 11 (20 November) | Pablo López | 9 | Miguelichi | "Al Mar" | Pablo's choice |
| Episode 11 (20 November) | Pablo López | 10 | Roger Padrós | "Feeling Good" | Public's vote |
| Episode 11 (20 November) | Antonio Orozco | 11 | Curricé | "Skin" | Antonio's choice |
| Episode 11 (20 November) | Antonio Orozco | 12 | Antonio Villar | "El Alma al Aire" | Eliminated |
| Episode 11 (20 November) | Antonio Orozco | 13 | Johanna Polvillo | "My All" | Public's vote |

Non-competition performances
| Order | Performers | Song |
|---|---|---|
| 1 | Team Antonio (Curricé, Johanna Polvillo, Antonio Villar) | "Estoy hecho de pedacitos de ti" |
| 2 | Team Laura (Juan José Alba, Paula Espinosa, Carlota Palacios) | "Viveme" |
| 3 | Team Pablo (Dayana Emma, Miguelichi, Roger Padrós) | "El Patio" |
| 4 | Team Alejandro (Adam Ainouz, Haizea Gómez, Rafael Ruiz) | "No Tengo Nada" |

=== Week 2: Semifinal (27 November) ===
The Semifinal started with a virtual performance of all sixty artists that were part of this season. Afterwards, each artist performed, as well as each coach performing with their two semifinalists. At the end of the episode, the public voted for their four favorite artists, from any team, to advance to the Finale.

With the advancements of Curricé, Paula Espinosa, Johanna Povollo and Kelly, Antonio Orozco and Laura became the first coaches to have more than one artist represented in the finals. Additionally, with the eliminations of Miguelichi, Adam Ainouz, Rafael Ruiz and Roger Padrós, Alejandro Sanz and Pablo López no longer have more artists, making it the first season since the inception of the show, which a coach did not have an artist represented at the finale. Moreover, this was also the first season in which only two coaches would be represented in the finale.

Colour key
| Artist was saved by the public and advanced to the Finale |
| Artist was eliminated |

| Episode | Coach | Order | Artist | Song | Result |
|---|---|---|---|---|---|
| Episode 12 (27 November) | Antonio Orozco | 1 | Curricé | "La Mentira" | Public's vote |
| Episode 12 (27 November) | Laura Pausini | 2 | Paula Espinosa | "You're Beautiful" | Public's vote |
| Episode 12 (27 November) | Pablo López | 3 | Miguelichi | "La Vereda de la Puerta de Atrás" | Eliminated |
| Episode 12 (27 November) | Alejandro Sanz | 4 | Adam Ainouz | "Piano Man" | Eliminated |
| Episode 12 (27 November) | Antonio Orozco | 5 | Johanna Polvillo | "All By Myself" | Public's vote |
| Episode 12 (27 November) | Alejandro Sanz | 6 | Rafael Ruiz | "El Trato" | Eliminated |
| Episode 12 (27 November) | Pablo López | 7 | Roger Padrós | "Sargento de Hierro" | Eliminated |
| Episode 12 (27 November) | Laura Pausini | 8 | Isaiah Kelly | "A Change Is Gonna Come" | Public's vote |

Non-competition performances
| Order | Performers | Song |
|---|---|---|
| 1 | Top 60 | "Otra Vez" |
| 2 | Pablo López & his team (Roger Padrós and Miguelichi) | "Mariposa" |
| 3 | Alejandro Sanz & his team (Adam Ainouz and Rafael Ruiz) | "Viviendo Deprisa" |
| 4 | Laura Pausini & her team (Isaiah Kelly and Paula Espinosa) | "La Solución" |
| 5 | Antonio Orozco & his team (Curricé and Johanna Polvillo) | "Hoy" |
| 6 | Miriam Rodríguez & Top 8 | "Dos Extraños en la Ciudad" |

=== Week 3: Finale (4 December) ===
The Finale started with the Top 4 performing together. Afterwards, each artist performed a song in solo and another one with a special guest. At the end of the episode, the public voted for their favorite artist, who was crowned the winner of La Voz 2020. It was not revealed who finished in third place and who finished in fourth, which means the bottom two artists were both considered third placers.

Colour key
| Artist won the season |
| Artist was the runner-up |
| Artist finished third |

| Episode | Coach | Artist | Order | Solo song | Order | Song with guest | Result |
|---|---|---|---|---|---|---|---|
| Episode 13 (4 December) | Antonio Orozco | Johanna Polvillo | 1 | "I Believe I Can Fly" | 5 | "La gitana" (with India Martínez) | Runner-up |
| Episode 13 (4 December) | Laura Pausini | Paula Espinosa | 6 | "Resistiré" | 2 | "Corazón sin vida" (with Aitana) | 3rd place |
| Episode 13 (4 December) | Antonio Orozco | Curricé | 7 | "Malamente" | 3 | "Superbalada" (with Mala Rodríguez) | 3rd place |
| Episode 13 (4 December) | Laura Pausini | Isaiah Kelly | 4 | "When We Were Young" | 8 | "Sueño" (with Beret) | Winner |

Non-competition performances
| Order | Performers | Song |
|---|---|---|
| 1 | Top 4 | "Viva la Vida" |
| 2 | Paula Espinosa & Johanna Polvillo with Vanesa Martín | "Cojo aire y vuelvo" |
| 3 | Curricé & Kelly with Sebastián Yatra | "A dónde van" |
| 4 | Alejandro Sanz & Pablo López | "La quiero a morir" |

== Elimination chart ==
=== Color key ===
Artist's info

- Team Alejandro
- Team Pablo
- Team Laura
- Team Antonio
- Comeback Stage Artist

Result details

- Winner
- Runner-up
- Third place
- Saved by the public
- Saved by her/his coach
- Winner of The Comeback Stage
- Eliminated

=== Overall ===
Final Phase results per week
| Artists | Week 1 | | Week 2 Semifinal | Week 3 Finale |
| Artists | Comeback Stage | Playoffs | Week 2 Semifinal | Week 3 Finale |
|---|---|---|---|---|
| Isaiah Kelly | Safe | Safe | Safe | Winner |
| Johanna Polvillo | —N/a | Safe | Safe | Runner-up |
| Curricé | —N/a | Safe | Safe | 3rd place |
| Paula Espinosa | —N/a | Safe | Safe | 3rd place |
| Adam Ainouz | —N/a | Safe | Eliminated | Eliminated (Week 2) |
| Miguelichi | —N/a | Safe | Eliminated | Eliminated (Week 2) |
| Rafael Ruiz | —N/a | Safe | Eliminated | Eliminated (Week 2) |
| Roger Padrós | —N/a | Safe | Eliminated | Eliminated (Week 2) |
| Antonio Villar | —N/a | Eliminated | Eliminated (Week 2) | |
| Carlota Palacios | —N/a | Eliminated | Eliminated (Week 2) | |
| Dayana Emma | —N/a | Eliminated | Eliminated (Week 2) | |
| Haizea Gómez | —N/a | Eliminated | Eliminated (Week 2) | |
| Juan José Alba | —N/a | Eliminated | Eliminated (Week 2) | |
| Sergio Chaves | Eliminated | Eliminated (Comeback Stage) | | |

=== Teams ===
Final Phase results per week
| Artists | Week 1 | Week 2 | Week 3 |
|---|---|---|---|
| Adam Ainouz | Coach's choice | Eliminated | |
| Rafael Ruiz | Public's vote | Eliminated | |
| Haizea Gómez | Eliminated | | |
| Miguelichi | Coach's choice | Eliminated | |
| Roger Padrós | Public's vote | Eliminated | |
| Dayana Emma | Eliminated | | |
| Isaiah Kelly | Public's vote | Advanced | Winner |
| Paula Espinosa | Coach's choice | Advanced | 3rd place |
| Carlota Palacios | Eliminated | | |
| Juan José Alba | Eliminated | | |
| Johanna Polvillo | Public's vote | Advanced | Runner-up |
| Curricé | Coach's choice | Advanced | 3rd place |
| Antonio Villar | Eliminated | | |
