= La Voz (Spanish TV series) season 9 =

La Voz
- Season 9
- Hosted by: Eva González
- Coaches: Luis Fonsi; Pablo López; Laura Pausini; Antonio Orozco
- Winner: Javier Crespo
- Winning coach: Antonio Orozco
- Runner-up: Génesis de Jesús

Release
- Original network: Antena 3
- Original release: 23 September – 16 December 2022

Season chronology
- ← Previous; Season 8

The ninth season of La Voz started airing on 23 September 2022 on Antena 3. Luis Fonsi returned as the only coach from the previous season, while Antonio Orozco, Pablo López, and Laura Pausini after one season hiatus returned for their fifth, fourth, and third season, respectively. This season was produced to be a dedication to the ten-year anniversary of the show. It was announced by Antena 3 that these four coaches were the ones who trusted and invested in this show from the beginning.

Javier Crespo was announced the winner of the ninth season, marking Antonio Orozco's second win as a coach, the first returning The Voice artist, and the first instance in which an artist who had a coach blocked by another coach in their blind audition (Antonio Orozco blocking Pablo López) would go on to win the entire Spanish season.

== Panelists ==
=== Coaches & Host ===
It was announced on 1 September 2022 that Luis Fonsi would be the only coach returning from last season. The winning coach Pablo Alborán from season 8, Malú, and Alejandro Sanz would not be returning this season. Antonio Orozco, Pablo López, and Laura Pausini after one season hiatus returned for their fifth, fourth, and third season, respectively. Meanwhile, Eva González returned as the host for her fourth season.

=== Advisors ===
In The Great Battles and the Knockouts, the four coaches invited singers to join them to coach their artists. In the Great Battles and the first phase of the Knockouts, Fonsi invited Lola Indigo, Antonio brought along Mala Rodríguez, Vanesa Martín joined Laura, and Raphael with Pablo. The coaches from the inaugural season, David Bisbal, Malú, Rosario, and Melendi joined the four coaches in the second phase of the Knockouts this season.

== Teams ==
- Winner
- Runner-up
- Third Place
- Fourth Place
- Artist was Eliminated in Semifinal
- Artist was Eliminated in Quarter-Final
- Artist was Eliminated in the Phase 2 of Knockouts
- Artist was Stolen in the Phase 1 of Knockouts
- Artist was Eliminated in the Phase 1 of Knockouts
- Artist was Eliminated in The Great Battles

Coaches' Teams
| Coaches | Top 56 Artists | | | | |
|---|---|---|---|---|---|
| Luis Fonsi | Génesis de Jesús | Antón Perard | Tayra Taylor | Juan García (Milos) | Félis Arriezu |
| Luis Fonsi | ~~Jonatan Santiago~~ | ~~Alba Ed-Dounia~~ | Demode Quartet | Adrián Garzía | Lucía Rodríguez |
| Luis Fonsi | Triana Ojeda | Dani Sánchez | Nani Gonçalves | Gilberta Wilson | Nicolás Moreno |
| Pablo López | Javier Santacruz | Ana Corbel | Teresa de Luis | Alba Ed-Dounia | Joshua Bactol |
| Pablo López | José Carlos Escobar | Sandra Corma | Álvaro Santos | Patricia Rubio | Kike Benito |
| Pablo López | Josué Sánchez | Alba Molina | Sofía Rico | Sara Guadalupe | Mari Carmona |
| Laura Pausini | Sergio del Boccio | Ana González | Gabriel Herrera | Fran Flores | Lara García |
| Laura Pausini | Dani Juanico | Víctor Bravo | Chiara Oliver | Adriana Terrén | Javier Simón |
| Laura Pausini | LuisFro | Omar González | Oliver Jaén | Eva Marco | Ana Davidson |
| Antonio Orozco | Javier Crespo | Salma Díaz | Juan Motos | Jonatan Santiago | Fael Hernández |
| Antonio Orozco | ~~Anton Perard~~ | ~~Fran Flores~~ | Adrián Benítez | Esperanza Bonelo | Tamara Valverde |
| Antonio Orozco | José Correa | Nathalia Wojcik | Altea Mainer | Sonia Gil | Álex Perea |
Note: Italicized names are stolen artists (names struck through within former teams).

== Blind Auditions ==
=== Introduction ===
The Blind Auditions premiered on 23 September 2022. The coaches kicked off the season with a performance of "Yo no me doy por vencido".

This season, each coach ends up with 14 artists by the end of the blind auditions, creating a total of 56 artists advancing to The Great Battles. The show canceled "The Comeback Stage" which was implemented in season 7 and season 8, so the artists who didn't get a coach turned around got eliminated immediately.

In addition, each coach was given three 'Blocks'. The coach can choose to push the 'block' button to prevent another coach from turning and getting the artist.

=== Notes & Color Keys ===
1. Though each coach was given three 'blocks', Fonsi didn't use his third 'block' in the Blinds.
2. A 'four-chair-turn' is received by a contestant once they got all four coaches attempted to turn for them, even if the coach was blocked.
3. The contestant Javier Crespo auditioned in the second episode participated in La Voz Kids Season 6 (2021) and was originally part of Team Melendi, before being stolen by Vanesa Martín. He was a finalist of the season but was eliminated in the first phase of the Final.

Blind auditions color key
| ✔ | Coach pressed "I WANT YOU" button |
| | Artist selected a coach's team |
| | Artist defaulted to a coach's team |
| | Artist was eliminated with no coach pressing their button and was not given a second chance by the coaches |
| | Artist was eliminated, but got a second chance by the coaches |
| | Artist received a 'four-chair-turn' |
| ✘ | Coach pressed "I WANT YOU" button, but was blocked by another coach from getting the artist |
| | Blocked by Fonsi; Blocked by Pablo; Blocked by Laura; Blocked by Antonio |

=== Blind Auditions Results ===
| Episode | Order | Artist | Song | Coach's and artist's choices | | | |
| Episode | Order | Artist | Song | Fonsi | Pablo | Laura | Antonio |
|---|---|---|---|---|---|---|---|
| Episode 1 (23 September) | 1 | Dani Juanico | "Anyone" | ✔ | ✔ | ✔ | ✔ |
| Episode 1 (23 September) | 2 | Nathalia Wojcik | "Riptide" | ✔ | ✘ | ✘ | ✔ |
| Episode 1 (23 September) | 3 | Ana González | "María de la O" | ✔ | ✔ | ✔ | ✔ |
| Episode 1 (23 September) | 4 | Andreas Oliver Lutz | "What a Wonderful World" | – | – | – | – |
| Episode 1 (23 September) | 5 | Álex Perea | "Sunday Morning" | – | – | – | ✔ |
| Episode 1 (23 September) | 6 | Dani Sánchez | "Are You Gonna Be My Girl" | ✔ | – | ✔ | – |
| Episode 1 (23 September) | 7 | Alba Ed-Dounia | "En cambio no" | ✔ | ✔ | – | ✔ |
| Episode 1 (23 September) | 8 | Nikka | "Strange Birds" | – | – | – | – |
| Episode 1 (23 September) | 9 | Kike Benito | "Punto de partida" | – | ✔ | – | ✔ |
| Episode 1 (23 September) | 10 | Antón Perard | "Une femme avec une femme" | ✔ | ✔ | ✘ | ✔ |
| Episode 1 (23 September) | 11 | La Negri | "Nana del caballo grande" | – | – | – | – |
| Episode 1 (23 September) | 12 | Patricia Rubio | "Mares de miel" | – | ✔ | – | ✔ |
| Episode 1 (23 September) | 13 | Álex Blaya | "Say You Won't Let Go" | – | – | – | – |
| Episode 1 (23 September) | 14 | Lara García | "Jealous" | – | – | ✔ | – |
| Episode 2 (30 September) | 1 | Jonatan Santiago | "Hymne à l'amour" | ✔ | ✔ | ✔ | ✔ |
| Episode 2 (30 September) | 2 | Haizea Roldán | "La despedida" | – | – | – | – |
| Episode 2 (30 September) | 3 | Javier Crespo | "Manos de tijera" | ✔ | ✘ | ✔ | ✔ |
| Episode 2 (30 September) | 4 | Gabriel Herrera | "Cómo mirarte" | – | – | – | – |
| Episode 2 (30 September) | 5 | Demode Quartet | "La flaca" | ✔ | ✔ | ✔ | ✔ |
| Episode 2 (30 September) | 6 | LuisFro | "ADMV" | ✔ | – | ✔ | ✔ |
| Episode 2 (30 September) | 7 | Marta Mallo | "Someone You Loved" | – | – | – | – |
| Episode 2 (30 September) | 8 | Juan Motos | "Porque morir es natural" | – | ✔ | – | ✔ |
| Episode 2 (30 September) | 9 | Sandra Corma | "Piece of My Heart" | – | ✔ | – | ✘ |
| Episode 2 (30 September) | 10 | Yadira Ferrer | "Hoy mi Habana" | – | – | – | – |
| Episode 2 (30 September) | 11 | Tayra Taylor | "Almost Is Never Enough" | ✔ | ✔ | ✔ | ✔ |
| Episode 2 (30 September) | 12 | Sara Guadalupe Ceballos | "Tuyo" | – | ✔ | – | – |
| Episode 2 (30 September) | 13 | Sergio del Boccio | "Colors" | ✔ | ✔ | ✔ | ✔ |
| Episode 3 (7 October) | 1 | Esperanza Bonelo | "Arráncame" | ✔ | ✔ | – | ✔ |
| Episode 3 (7 October) | 2 | Génesis de Jesús | "All of Me" | ✔ | ✔ | ✔ | ✔ |
| Episode 3 (7 October) | 3 | Javier Santacruz | "Back to Black" | ✔ | ✔ | ✔ | – |
| Episode 3 (7 October) | 4 | Ana Vas | "Highway to Hell" | – | – | – | – |
| Episode 3 (7 October) | 5 | Eva Marco | "Casta diva" | – | – | ✔ | ✔ |
| Episode 3 (7 October) | 6 | Oriol López | "Asignatura pendiente" | – | – | – | – |
| Episode 3 (7 October) | 7 | Salma Díaz | "Casi te rozo" | ✔ | ✔ | ✔ | ✔ |
| Episode 3 (7 October) | 8 | Ana Corbel | "María la portuguesa" | – | ✔ | – | – |
| Episode 3 (7 October) | 9 | Mª Jesús López | "Dibújame deprisa" | – | – | – | – |
| Episode 3 (7 October) | 10 | Félis Arriezu | "Can I Be Him" | ✔ | – | ✔ | – |
| Episode 3 (7 October) | 11 | Josué Sánchez | "Billie Jean" | ✘ | ✔ | ✔ | – |
| Episode 3 (7 October) | 12 | Noemi Fernández | "One Night Only" | – | – | – | – |
| Episode 3 (7 October) | 13 | Javier Simón | "Overjoyed" | ✘ | ✔ | ✔ | – |
| Episode 4 (14 October) | 1 | Nicolás Moreno | "La despedida" | ✔ | ✔ | ✔ | ✔ |
| Episode 4 (14 October) | 2 | Gabriel Herrera | "Easy on Me" | ✔ | – | ✔ | ✔ |
| Episode 4 (14 October) | 3 | Sofía Rico | "Una nube blanca" | – | ✔ | – | – |
| Episode 4 (14 October) | 4 | Juan García (Milos) | "Human" | ✔ | – | – | – |
| Episode 4 (14 October) | 5 | Ana Polanco | "Te extraño" | – | – | – | – |
| Episode 4 (14 October) | 6 | Teresa de Luis | "Dernière danse" | ✘ | ✔ | – | ✔ |
| Episode 4 (14 October) | 7 | Adrián Benítez | "Abre la puerta" | – | ✔ | – | ✔ |
| Episode 4 (14 October) | 8 | Leire Medina | "Todo contigo" | – | – | – | – |
| Episode 4 (14 October) | 9 | Victor Bravo | "Time Waits for No One" | – | ✘ | ✔ | – |
| Episode 4 (14 October) | 10 | José María Buitrago | "Camino de Madrid" | – | – | – | – |
| Episode 4 (14 October) | 11 | José Correa | "Viviendo deprisa" | – | – | – | ✔ |
| Episode 4 (14 October) | 12 | Ishtar Romero | "Read All About It" | – | – | – | – |
| Episode 4 (14 October) | 13 | Ana Davidson (Maw) | "Ain't No Sunshine" | – | – | ✔ | – |
| Episode 5 (21 October) | 1 | Joshua Carlos Bactol | "Havana" | – | ✔ | – | ✔ |
| Episode 5 (21 October) | 2 | Tamara Valverde | "Desencuentro" | – | ✔ | – | ✔ |
| Episode 5 (21 October) | 3 | Álvaro Santos | "Tuyo" | ✔ | ✔ | ✔ | ✔ |
| Episode 5 (21 October) | 4 | Marina Hernández | "It's All Coming Back to Me Now" | – | – | – | – |
| Episode 5 (21 October) | 5 | Oliver Jaén | "Lately" | – | – | ✔ | – |
| Episode 5 (21 October) | 6 | Nani Gonçalves | "Todo cambió" | ✔ | ✔ | – | ✔ |
| Episode 5 (21 October) | 7 | Ary Saribekyan | "I Wanna Dance with Somebody" | – | – | – | – |
| Episode 5 (21 October) | 8 | José Carlos Escobar | "Te quiero, te quiero" | ✔ | ✔ | – | – |
| Episode 5 (21 October) | 9 | Lucía Rodríguez | "Ángel caído" | ✔ | – | – | – |
| Episode 5 (21 October) | 10 | José Miguel Otero | "Parla piu piano" | – | – | – | – |
| Episode 5 (21 October) | 11 | Fael Hernández | "Aroma de mujer" | – | – | – | ✔ |
| Episode 5 (21 October) | 12 | Àuria Franch | "These Days" | – | – | – | – |
| Episode 5 (21 October) | 13 | Adriana Terrén | "God Is a Woman" | ✘ | – | ✔ | ✔ |
| Episode 6 (28 October) | 1 | Chiara OIiver | "Lately" | ✔ | ✔ | ✔ | ✔ |
| Episode 6 (28 October) | 2 | Gilberta Wilson | "Hurt" | ✔ | ✔ | ✘ | ✔ |
| Episode 6 (28 October) | 3 | Alex León | "Summer Wind" | – | – | – | – |
| Episode 6 (28 October) | 4 | Adrián Garzía | "Sorry Seems to Be the Hardest Word" | ✔ | – | – | – |
| Episode 6 (28 October) | 5 | Vitaliia Makarenko | "Con te partirò" | – | – | – | – |
| Episode 6 (28 October) | 6 | Mari Carmona | "Vuelves" | – | ✔ | – | – |
| Episode 6 (28 October) | 7 | Lalo Torres | "Maggie despierta" | – | – | – | – |
| Episode 6 (28 October) | 8 | Triana Ojeda | "Remolino" | ✔ | ✔ | ✔ | ✔ |
| Episode 6 (28 October) | 9 | Omar González | "Idilio" | Team Full | ✔ | ✔ | ✔ |
| Episode 6 (28 October) | 10 | Altea Mainer | "Baby I'm a Fool" | Team Full | ✔ | Team Full | ✔ |
| Episode 6 (28 October) | 11 | Fran Flores | "No tengo nada" | Team Full | – | Team Full | ✔ |
| Episode 6 (28 October) | 12 | Sonia Gil | "Simply the Best" | Team Full | – | Team Full | ✔ |
| Episode 6 (28 October) | 13 | Alba Molina | "Nana del Mediterraneo" | Team Full | ✔ | Team Full | Team Full |

== The Great Battles ==
The Great Battles aired on 4 November 2022. Same as last season, this season features "The Great Battles" where the coaches pair their artists into four groups of three to five where they sing a song together.

For each team, the coach will have to decide if any of the artists in this group receives the 'Fast-Pass' so that the artist will advance to the next round right away. After all four groups performed, the coach then chooses six contestants to advance to the Knockouts while others will be eliminated, regardless of which group they were in. Also, there is no 'Steal' or 'Save' available for coaches to get artists from other teams or save their own contestants.

This season, the four coaches invited singers as advisors to join them in the Great Battles. Fonsi invited Lola Indigo, Antonio brought along Mala Rodríguez, Vanesa Martin joined Laura, and Raphael with Pablo.

The four coaches performed "Entre sobras y sobras me faltas" by Antonio Orozco at the beginning of the episode.

The Great Battles color key
| Artist got a 'Fast-Pass' and advanced to the Knockouts |
| Artist chosen by coach at the final decision to advance to the Knockouts |
| Artist was not chosen by coach and was eliminated |

The Great Battles Results
| Episode | Coach | Order | Song | Artists | Results |
|---|---|---|---|---|---|
| Episode 7 (4 November) | Laura Pausini | 1 | "Born This Way" by Lady Gaga | Chiara Oliver | Advanced |
| Episode 7 (4 November) | Laura Pausini | 1 | "Born This Way" by Lady Gaga | Lara García | Fast-Pass |
| Episode 7 (4 November) | Laura Pausini | 1 | "Born This Way" by Lady Gaga | Sergio del Boccio | Advanced |
| Episode 7 (4 November) | Laura Pausini | 1 | "Born This Way" by Lady Gaga | Adriana Terrén | Eliminated |
| Episode 7 (4 November) | Laura Pausini | 2 | "Pray" by Sam Smith | Dani Juanico | Advanced |
| Episode 7 (4 November) | Laura Pausini | 2 | "Pray" by Sam Smith | Víctor Bravo | Advanced |
| Episode 7 (4 November) | Laura Pausini | 2 | "Pray" by Sam Smith | Javier Simón | Eliminated |
| Episode 7 (4 November) | Laura Pausini | 3 | "Contigo" by Sebastián Yatra | Gabriel Herrera | Advanced |
| Episode 7 (4 November) | Laura Pausini | 3 | "Contigo" by Sebastián Yatra | Ana González | Advanced |
| Episode 7 (4 November) | Laura Pausini | 3 | "Contigo" by Sebastián Yatra | LuisFro | Eliminated |
| Episode 7 (4 November) | Laura Pausini | 3 | "Contigo" by Sebastián Yatra | Omar González | Eliminated |
| Episode 7 (4 November) | Laura Pausini | 4 | "Bohemian Rhapsody" by Queen | Oliver Jaén | Eliminated |
| Episode 7 (4 November) | Laura Pausini | 4 | "Bohemian Rhapsody" by Queen | Eva Marco | Eliminated |
| Episode 7 (4 November) | Laura Pausini | 4 | "Bohemian Rhapsody" by Queen | Ana Davidson | Eliminated |
| Episode 7 (4 November) | Antonio Orozco | 5 | "No es lo mismo" by Alejandro Sanz | Juan Motos | Advanced |
| Episode 7 (4 November) | Antonio Orozco | 5 | "No es lo mismo" by Alejandro Sanz | Fael Hernández | Fast-Pass |
| Episode 7 (4 November) | Antonio Orozco | 5 | "No es lo mismo" by Alejandro Sanz | Adrián Benítez | Advanced |
| Episode 7 (4 November) | Antonio Orozco | 5 | "No es lo mismo" by Alejandro Sanz | Fran Flores | Advanced |
| Episode 7 (4 November) | Antonio Orozco | 6 | "No!" by Pablo López and Miriam Rodríguez | Esperanza Bonelo | Eliminated |
| Episode 7 (4 November) | Antonio Orozco | 6 | "No!" by Pablo López and Miriam Rodríguez | Salma Díaz | Advanced |
| Episode 7 (4 November) | Antonio Orozco | 6 | "No!" by Pablo López and Miriam Rodríguez | Tamara Valverde | Eliminated |
| Episode 7 (4 November) | Antonio Orozco | 6 | "No!" by Pablo López and Miriam Rodríguez | José Correa | Eliminated |
| Episode 7 (4 November) | Antonio Orozco | 7 | "Broken Strings" by James Morrison | Nathalia Wojcik | Eliminated |
| Episode 7 (4 November) | Antonio Orozco | 7 | "Broken Strings" by James Morrison | Altea Mainer | Eliminated |
| Episode 7 (4 November) | Antonio Orozco | 7 | "Broken Strings" by James Morrison | Sonia Gil | Eliminated |
| Episode 7 (4 November) | Antonio Orozco | 8 | "Hold On" by Justin Bieber | Anton Perard | Advanced |
| Episode 7 (4 November) | Antonio Orozco | 8 | "Hold On" by Justin Bieber | Álex Perea | Eliminated |
| Episode 7 (4 November) | Antonio Orozco | 8 | "Hold On" by Justin Bieber | Javier Crespo | Advanced |
| Episode 7 (4 November) | Pablo López | 9 | "Somewhere Only We Know" by Keane | Joshua Bactol | Fast-Pass |
| Episode 7 (4 November) | Pablo López | 9 | "Somewhere Only We Know" by Keane | Javier Santacruz | Advanced |
| Episode 7 (4 November) | Pablo López | 9 | "Somewhere Only We Know" by Keane | Teresa de Luis | Advanced |
| Episode 7 (4 November) | Pablo López | 10 | "Y ya te quería" by Alejandro Sanz | Ana Corbel | Advanced |
| Episode 7 (4 November) | Pablo López | 10 | "Y ya te quería" by Alejandro Sanz | José Carlos Escobar | Advanced |
| Episode 7 (4 November) | Pablo López | 10 | "Y ya te quería" by Alejandro Sanz | Patricia Rubio | Eliminated |
| Episode 7 (4 November) | Pablo López | 11 | "All for Love" by Bryan Adams, Rod Stewart and Sting | Kike Benito | Eliminated |
| Episode 7 (4 November) | Pablo López | 11 | "All for Love" by Bryan Adams, Rod Stewart and Sting | Josué Sánchez | Eliminated |
| Episode 7 (4 November) | Pablo López | 11 | "All for Love" by Bryan Adams, Rod Stewart and Sting | Sandra Corma | Advanced |
| Episode 7 (4 November) | Pablo López | 12 | "Ya no" by Manuel Carrasco | Álvaro Santos | Advanced |
| Episode 7 (4 November) | Pablo López | 12 | "Ya no" by Manuel Carrasco | Alba Molina | Eliminated |
| Episode 7 (4 November) | Pablo López | 12 | "Ya no" by Manuel Carrasco | Sofía Rico | Eliminated |
| Episode 7 (4 November) | Pablo López | 12 | "Ya no" by Manuel Carrasco | Sara Guadalupe | Eliminated |
| Episode 7 (4 November) | Pablo López | 12 | "Ya no" by Manuel Carrasco | Mari Carmona | Eliminated |
| Episode 7 (4 November) | Luis Fonsi | 13 | "End of the Road" by Boyz II Men | Génesis de Jesús | Fast-Pass |
| Episode 7 (4 November) | Luis Fonsi | 13 | "End of the Road" by Boyz II Men | Adrián Garzía | Eliminated |
| Episode 7 (4 November) | Luis Fonsi | 13 | "End of the Road" by Boyz II Men | Demode Quartet | Advanced |
| Episode 7 (4 November) | Luis Fonsi | 13 | "End of the Road" by Boyz II Men | Juan García (Milos) | Advanced |
| Episode 7 (4 November) | Luis Fonsi | 14 | "A puro dolor" by Pitingo | Jonatan Santiago | Advanced |
| Episode 7 (4 November) | Luis Fonsi | 14 | "A puro dolor" by Pitingo | Lucía Rodríguez | Eliminated |
| Episode 7 (4 November) | Luis Fonsi | 14 | "A puro dolor" by Pitingo | Triana Ojeda | Eliminated |
| Episode 7 (4 November) | Luis Fonsi | 15 | "One" by U2 | Dani Sánchez | Eliminated |
| Episode 7 (4 November) | Luis Fonsi | 15 | "One" by U2 | Félis Arriezu | Advanced |
| Episode 7 (4 November) | Luis Fonsi | 15 | "One" by U2 | Nani Gonçalves | Eliminated |
| Episode 7 (4 November) | Luis Fonsi | 16 | "Entre otros cien" by Marta Soto | Alba Ed-Dounia | Advanced |
| Episode 7 (4 November) | Luis Fonsi | 16 | "Entre otros cien" by Marta Soto | Tayra Taylor | Advanced |
| Episode 7 (4 November) | Luis Fonsi | 16 | "Entre otros cien" by Marta Soto | Gilberta Wilson | Eliminated |
| Episode 7 (4 November) | Luis Fonsi | 16 | "Entre otros cien" by Marta Soto | Nicolás Moreno | Eliminated |

== Knockouts ==
In this round the remaining 28 artists, 7 per team, will compete for their spots in the Lives. Just as last season, this season the Knockouts is divided into two phases.

This season, the four advisors invited by the coaches in "The Great Battles" continued to be on the show in the first phase of the Knockouts. As for the second phase, David Bisbal, Malú, Rosario, and Melendi joined the four coaches as advisors.

=== Phase 1 ===
In the first phase, the seven artists on each team will perform one by one. Only one artist will receive the 'Fast-Pass (Pase Directo)' and directly advance to the Lives. Three artists will be put in the 'Danger Zone' where they will compete for two remaining spots in the second phase. In addition, each coach was given a 'Steal' to get an artist from another team to advance to the Lives. Once an artist is announced to be put into the 'Danger Zone', the coach whose 'Steal' is still available will have the chance to steal the artist. Artists who got stolen will automatically advance to the Lives. After an artist got stolen, the coach of the team then chooses another artist for the 'Danger Zone'. This procedure comes to an end once there are three artists officially in the 'Danger Zone'. The remaining artists will be eliminated in this round and won't have the chance to compete next week.

The first episode of the Knockouts features Team Pablo and Team Laura. Both coaches performed a song together with their advisor before their artists began to perform. Pablo López and his advisor Raphael performed "Lo saben mis zapatos". Laura Pausini and her advisor Vanesa Martín took the stage with "Yo sí".

The second episode of the Knockouts features Team Antonio and Team Fonsi. Both coaches performed a song together with their advisor before their artists began to perform. Luis Fonsi and his advisor Lola Índigo performed "Imposible". Antonio Orozco and his advisor Mala Rodríguez sang "Tengo que contarte" together.

Knockouts (Phase 1) color key
| Artist got a 'Fast-Pass' and advanced to the Lives |
| Artist put in the 'Danger Zone' and entered Phase 2 |
| Artist was eliminated in Phase 1 |
| Artist initially put into the 'Danger Zone' but was stolen by another coach and advanced to the Lives |

Knockouts (Phase 1) Results
| Episode | Coach | Order | Artist | Song | Results |
|---|---|---|---|---|---|
| Episode 8 (11 November) | Pablo López | 1 | Joshua Bactol | "The Man Who Can't Be Moved" | Danger Zone |
| Episode 8 (11 November) | Pablo López | 2 | Teresa de Luis | "Voilà" | Fast-Pass |
| Episode 8 (11 November) | Pablo López | 3 | Ana Corbel | "Cançao do mar" | Danger Zone |
| Episode 8 (11 November) | Pablo López | 4 | Javier Santacruz | "Blinding Lights" | Danger Zone |
| Episode 8 (11 November) | Pablo López | 5 | José Carlos Escobar | "Un vestido y un amor" | Eliminated |
| Episode 8 (11 November) | Pablo López | 6 | Sandra Corma | "Toxic" | Eliminated |
| Episode 8 (11 November) | Pablo López | 7 | Álvaro Santos | "Falling Like the Stars" | Eliminated |
| Episode 8 (11 November) | Laura Pausini | 8 | Lara Garcia | "I Put a Spell on You" | Danger Zone |
| Episode 8 (11 November) | Laura Pausini | 9 | Ana González | "Lucía" | Danger Zone |
| Episode 8 (11 November) | Laura Pausini | 10 | Sergio del Boccio | "Believe" | Fast-Pass |
| Episode 8 (11 November) | Laura Pausini | 11 | Gabriel Herrera | "Torn" | Danger Zone |
| Episode 8 (11 November) | Laura Pausini | 12 | Dani Juanico | "Halo" | Eliminated |
| Episode 8 (11 November) | Laura Pausini | 13 | Víctor Bravo | "Vivir así es morir de amor" | Eliminated |
| Episode 8 (11 November) | Laura Pausini | 14 | Chiara Oliver | "traitor" | Eliminated |
| Episode 9 (18 November) | Luis Fonsi | 1 | Génesis de Jesús | "A Song for You" | Fast-Pass |
| Episode 9 (18 November) | Luis Fonsi | 2 | Félis Arriezu | "Chasing Cars" | Danger Zone |
| Episode 9 (18 November) | Luis Fonsi | 3 | Jonatan Santiago | "La Bohème" | Stolen by Antonio |
| Episode 9 (18 November) | Luis Fonsi | 4 | Tayra Taylor | "Like I'm Gonna Lose You" | Danger Zone |
| Episode 9 (18 November) | Luis Fonsi | 5 | Juan García (Milos) | "Say Something" | Danger Zone |
| Episode 9 (18 November) | Luis Fonsi | 6 | Alba Ed-Dounia | "Aléjate de mí" | Stolen by Pablo |
| Episode 9 (18 November) | Luis Fonsi | 7 | Demode Quartet | "Killing Me Softly" | Eliminated |
| Episode 9 (18 November) | Antonio Orozco | 8 | Juan Motos | "Bulerías de la perla" | Danger Zone |
| Episode 9 (18 November) | Antonio Orozco | 9 | Fael Hernández | "Que siempre sea verano" | Danger Zone |
| Episode 9 (18 November) | Antonio Orozco | 10 | Javier Crespo | "Me rehúso" | Fast-Pass |
| Episode 9 (18 November) | Antonio Orozco | 11 | Anton Perard | "Quelqu'un m'a dit" | Stolen by Fonsi |
| Episode 9 (18 November) | Antonio Orozco | 12 | Salma Díaz | "Montañas de sal" | Danger Zone |
| Episode 9 (18 November) | Antonio Orozco | 13 | Adrián Benítez | "Pájaros de barro" | Eliminated |
| Episode 9 (18 November) | Antonio Orozco | 14 | Fran Flores | "Sabrás" | Stolen by Laura |

=== Phase 2 ===
In the second phase, the remaining three artists on each team perform individually for the final two spots left on their coaches' team in the Lives. The audience will have the opportunity to decide which artists advance. Among the three artists, the one with the most vote will be saved by the public and advance to the Lives. The coach then chooses another artist out of the remaining two to advance, eliminating the other one.

The four coaches invited another round of advisors in this phase. David Bisbal, Rosario, Malú and Melendi, who were the coaches of the debut season of the series. They performed "Vivir deprisa" by Alejandro Sanz at the beginning of the episode.

Knockouts (Phase 2) color key
| Artist was saved by public's vote and advanced to the Lives |
| Artist was saved by his/her coach and advanced to the Lives |
| Artist was eliminated |

Final Knockouts Results
| Episode | Coach | Order | Artist | Song | Result |
|---|---|---|---|---|---|
| Episode 10 (25 November) | Laura Pausini | 1 | Lara García | "Crazy" | Eliminated |
| Episode 10 (25 November) | Laura Pausini | 2 | Gabriel Herrera | "Mi historia entre tus dedos" | Coach's Choice |
| Episode 10 (25 November) | Laura Pausini | 3 | Ana González | "A tu vera" | Public's Vote |
| Episode 10 (25 November) | Antonio Orozco | 4 | Juan Motos | "Lágrimas negras" | Coach's Choice |
| Episode 10 (25 November) | Antonio Orozco | 5 | Salma Díaz | "Aprendíz" | Public's Vote |
| Episode 10 (25 November) | Antonio Orozco | 6 | Fael Hernández | "Las costuras del alma" | Eliminated |
| Episode 10 (25 November) | Pablo López | 7 | Joshua Bactol | "Somebody to Love" | Eliminated |
| Episode 10 (25 November) | Pablo López | 8 | Ana Corbel | "Una rosa es una rosa" | Coach's Choice |
| Episode 10 (25 November) | Pablo López | 9 | Javier Santacruz | "Another Love" | Public's Vote |
| Episode 10 (25 November) | Luis Fonsi | 10 | Juan García (Milos) | "Stone Cold" | Coach's Choice |
| Episode 10 (25 November) | Luis Fonsi | 11 | Félis Arriezu | "As It Was" | Eliminated |
| Episode 10 (25 November) | Luis Fonsi | 12 | Tayra Taylor | "When You Believe" | Public's Vote |

== Live shows ==
=== Week 1: Quarter-Final ===
The Lives aired on 1 December 2022. The Top 16 artists, four from each team, performed one by one. For each team, the artist with the most votes from the public will advance to the Semi-Final, the coach then chooses one artist out of the remaining three to as the second semi-finalist. Only 8 artists will move on to the Semi-Final.

Laura Pausini, Pablo López, Antonio Orozco and Luis Fonsi kicked off the Quarter-Final performing "En cambio no" by Laura Pausini.

Week 1: Quarter-Final color key
| Artist was saved by public's vote and advanced to the Semi-Final |
| Artist was saved by his/her coach and advanced to the Semi-Final |
| Artist was eliminated |

Week 1: Quarter-Final Performances & Results
| Episode | Coach | Order | Artist | Song | Results |
|---|---|---|---|---|---|
| Episode 11 (2 December) | Antonio Orozco | 1 | Salma Díaz | "El gato" | Coach's Choice |
| Episode 11 (2 December) | Antonio Orozco | 2 | Jonatan Santiago | "Comme d'habitude" | Eliminated |
| Episode 11 (2 December) | Antonio Orozco | 3 | Juan Motos | "Corazón loco" | Eliminated |
| Episode 11 (2 December) | Antonio Orozco | 4 | Javier Crespo | "El mismo aire" | Public's Vote |
| Episode 11 (2 December) | Luis Fonsi | 5 | Tayra Taylor | "Creep" | Eliminated |
| Episode 11 (2 December) | Luis Fonsi | 6 | Juan García (Milos) | "Warrior" | Eliminated |
| Episode 11 (2 December) | Luis Fonsi | 7 | Génesis de Jesús | "Lay Me Down" | Public's Vote |
| Episode 11 (2 December) | Luis Fonsi | 8 | Anton Perard | "Entre tú y mil males" | Coach's Choice |
| Episode 11 (2 December) | Laura Pausini | 9 | Sergio del Boccio | "Tu falta de querer" | Coach's Choice |
| Episode 11 (2 December) | Laura Pausini | 10 | Gabriel Herrera | "Amarte por mil años más" | Eliminated |
| Episode 11 (2 December) | Laura Pausini | 11 | Fran Flores | "El viaje" | Eliminated |
| Episode 11 (2 December) | Laura Pausini | 12 | Ana González | "Y sin embargo te quiero" | Public's Vote |
| Episode 11 (2 December) | Pablo López | 13 | Alba Ed-Dounia | "Oye" (Spanish version of "Listen" by Beyoncé) | Eliminated |
| Episode 11 (2 December) | Pablo López | 14 | Javier Santacruz | "The Winner Takes It All" | Public's Vote |
| Episode 11 (2 December) | Pablo López | 15 | Teresa de Luis | "Je ve souviens" | Eliminated |
| Episode 11 (2 December) | Pablo López | 16 | Ana Corbel | "Cinema Paradiso" | Coach's Choice |

=== Week 2: Semi-Final ===
The Semi-Final aired on 9 December 2022. For each team, the remaining two artists first perform with their coach and then the guest invited by their coach. The guests are the advisors for the second phase of the Knockouts. After the duets, they will have to take the stage individually for a solo performance. The four artists who receive the most vote from the public, regardless of which team they are on, will advance to the Grand Final.

With the elimination of Ana Corbel and Javier Santacruz, Pablo López no longer has any artist remaining to represent him in the Grand Final. This is the second time that he has no artists in the final. Additionally, with the advancement of Sergio del Boccio and Ana González, this marks the second time that Laura Pausini has two artists representing her in the Grand Final.

Week 2: Semi-Final color key
| Artist was saved by public's vote and advanced to the Grand Final |
| Artist was eliminated |

Week 2: Semi-Final Performances & Results
| Episode | Coach | Order | Artist | Solo | Duet with Coach | Duet with Guest | Results |
|---|---|---|---|---|---|---|---|
| Episode 12 (9 December) | Pablo López | 1 | Javier Santacruz | "Digan lo que digan" | "Mariposa" | "Culpable" (with David Bisbal) | Eliminated |
| Episode 12 (9 December) | Pablo López | 2 | Ana Corbel | "Volver" | "Mariposa" | "Culpable" (with David Bisbal) | Eliminated |
| Episode 12 (9 December) | Antonio Orozco | 3 | Javier Crespo | "Tusa" | "No hay más" | "Usted"/"Aguante" (with Mala Rodríguez) | Advanced |
| Episode 12 (9 December) | Antonio Orozco | 4 | Salma Díaz | "Recuérdame" | "No hay más" | "Usted"/"Aguante" (with Mala Rodríguez) | Eliminated |
| Episode 12 (9 December) | Luis Fonsi | 5 | Génesis de Jesús | "Gravity" | "Llegaste tú" | "Toy Story" (with Lola Índigo) | Advanced |
| Episode 12 (9 December) | Luis Fonsi | 6 | Antón Perard | "Ne me quitte pas" | "Llegaste tú" | "Toy Story" (with Lola Índigo) | Eliminated |
| Episode 12 (9 December) | Laura Pausini | 7 | Sergio del Boccio | "Angels" | "Volveré junto a ti" | "Quién lo diría" (with Vanesa Martín) | Advanced |
| Episode 12 (9 December) | Laura Pausini | 8 | Ana González | "Pena, penita, pena" | "Volveré junto a ti" | "Quién lo diría" (with Vanesa Martín) | Advanced |

Non-competition Performances
| Episode | Order | Performers | Song |
|---|---|---|---|
| Episode 12 (9 December) | 12.1 | The Semifinalists (Antón Perard, Génesis de Jesús, Javier Santacruz, Ana Corbel, Sergio del Boccio, Ana González, Salma Díaz and Javier Crespo) | "Hay que vivir el momento" by Manuel Carrasco |
| Episode 12 (9 December) | 12.2 | Pablo Alborán and the Semifinalists (Antón Perard, Génesis de Jesús, Javier Santacruz, Ana Corbel, Sergio del Boccio, Ana González, Salma Díaz and Javier Crespo) | "Viaje a nada lado" by Pablo Alborán |

=== Week 3: Grand Final ===
It was announced on 14 December by Antena that the Grand Final will feature Raphael, Ana Mena, Malú, María José Llergo, Melendi and Manuel Carrasco joining the show for duets with the finalists. The winner of 'La Voz' will also have as a prize to be the opening act for the next edition of Stalite Catalana Occidente.

In the Grand Final, the four finalists have to each sing a duet with one of the guests and then take the stage with a solo performance.

Week 3: Grand Final Results
| Episode | Coach | Artist | Order | Solo | Order | Duet with Guest | Results |
|---|---|---|---|---|---|---|---|
| Episode 13 (16 December) | Laura Pausini | Ana González | 1 | "La Llorona" | 7 | "Mira que eres linda" (with María José Llergo) | Fourth place |
| Episode 13 (16 December) | Antonio Orozco | Javier Crespo | 4 | "La Bachata" | 5 | "Eres" (with Manuel Carrasco) | Winner |
| Episode 13 (16 December) | Luis Fonsi | Génesis de Jesús | 6 | "You Are the Reason" | 2 | "Aprendiz" (with Malú) | Runner-up |
| Episode 13 (16 December) | Laura Pausini | Sergio del Boccio | 8 | "Rise Like a Phoenix" | 3 | "Destino o casualidad" (with Melendi) | Third place |

Non-competition Performances
| Episode | Order | Performer(s) | Song |
|---|---|---|---|
| Episode 13 (December 16) | 13.1 | The Finalists (Génesis de Jesús, Sergio del Boccio, Ana González, and Javier Crespo) | "La música no se toca" by Alejandro Sanz |
| Episode 13 (December 16) | 13.2 | Pablo López | "Quasi" by Pablo López |

== Ratings & Reception ==
'La Voz' sweeps every Friday on Antena 3. The talent show continues incombustible and has been the absolute leader during its broadcast slot and the leading entertainment program each week. This season has maintained an 18.3% average screen share with 1.7 million viewers, even improving the performance of the previous edition of the format. It was reported that an active 5.2 million viewers tune in through Antena 3 for the show 'La Voz' each Friday.

As for the performance of targeted market share, 'La Voz' triumphs and takes the overall lead. It achieves its best results among viewers aged 13 to 24 with a 20.6% average screen share. In regions such as Murcia (25.9%), Madrid (20.7%), Andalusia (20.4%), Canary Islands (20.1%), Valencia (19.9%) or Castilla y León (19.7%), 'La Voz' remains to be the steady leader.
