= Sancho Panza =

Character in Don Quixote

- Don Quixote character
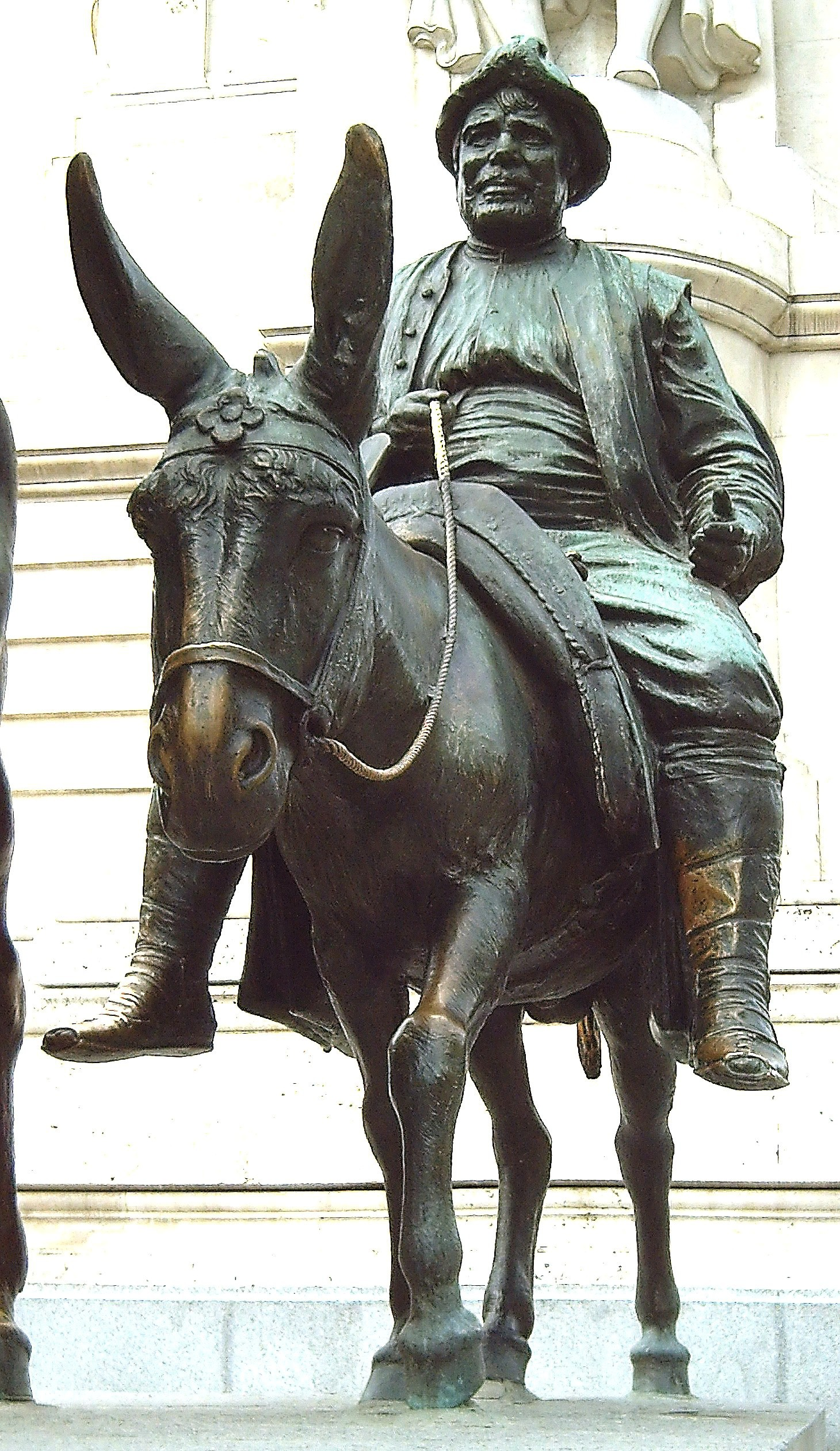
- Statue of Sancho Panza in Madrid (Lorenzo Coullaut Valera, 1930)
- Created by: Miguel de Cervantes
- Portrayed by: Irving Jacobson; Tony Martinez; Bob Hoskins; Ernie Sabella; James Coco; Jacob Batalon; Kim Yea-lim

In-universe information
- Gender: Male
- Title: Hidalgo
- Occupation: Peasant / Squire
- Spouse: Teresa Cascajo de Panza
- Children: María Sancha Panza Cascajo, Sanchica
- Religion: Roman Catholic
- Nationality: Spanish

Sancho Panza (/ˈpænzə/; Spanish: [ˈsantʃo ˈpanθa]) is a fictional character in the novel Don Quixote written by Spanish author Miguel de Cervantes Saavedra in 1605. Sancho acts as squire to Don Quixote and provides comments throughout the novel, known as sanchismos, that are a combination of broad humour, ironic Spanish proverbs, and earthy wit. Panza in Spanish means "belly" (cf. English "paunch", Italian pancia, several Italian dialects panza, Portuguese and Galician pança, French panse, Romanian pântec, Catalan panxa).

== Don Quixote ==
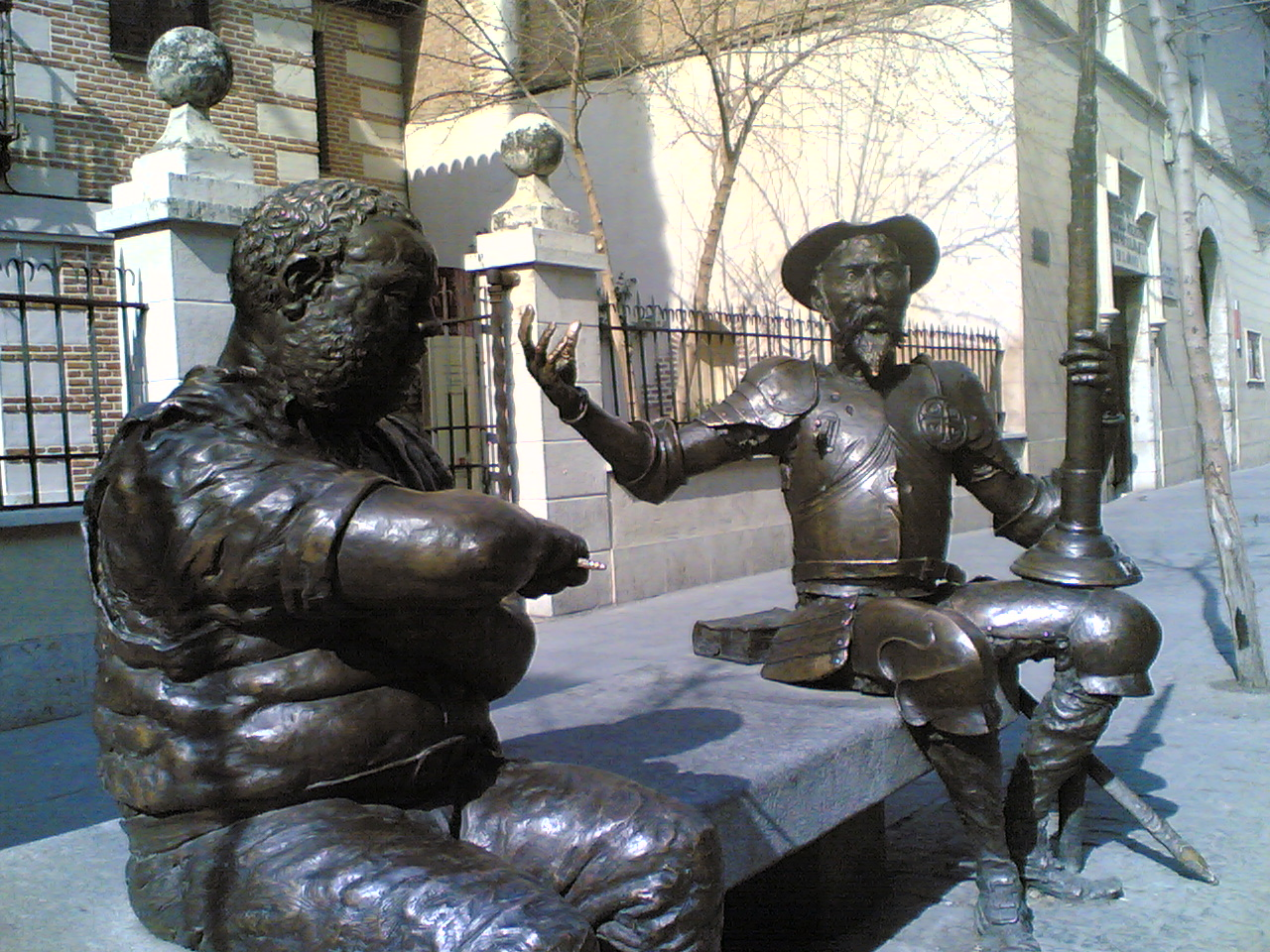
Bronze statues of Sancho Panza (L) and Don Quixote (R) at the Cervantes Birthplace Museum

Before a fit of madness turned Alonso Quijano into Don Quixote, Sancho Panza was indeed his servant. When the novel begins, Sancho has been married for a long time to a woman named Teresa Cascajo and has a daughter, María Sancha (also named Marisancha, Marica, María, Sancha, and Sanchica), who is said to be old enough to be married. Sancho's wife is described more or less as a feminine version of Sancho, both in looks and behaviour. When Don Quixote proposes Sancho to be his squire, neither he nor his family strongly oppose it.

Sancho is illiterate and proud of it but by influence of his new master, he develops considerable knowledge about some books. Sancho provides the earthy wisdom of Spanish proverbs, surprising his master. During the travels with Don Quixote, he keeps contact with his wife by dictating letters addressed to her.

Sancho Panza offers interpolated narrative voice throughout the tale, a literary convention invented by Cervantes. Sancho Panza is precursor to "the sidekick," and is symbolic of practicality over idealism. Sancho is the everyman, who, though not sharing his master's delusional "enchantment" until late in the novel, remains his ever-faithful companion realist, and functions as the clever sidekick. Salvador de Madariaga detected that, as the book progresses, there is a "Quixotization" of Sancho and a "Sanchification" of Don Quixote, so much that, when the knight recovers sanity on his deathbed, it is Sancho who tries to convince him to become pastoral shepherds.

In the novel, Don Quixote comments on the historical state and condition of Aragón and Castilla, which are vying for power in Europe. Sancho Panza represents, among other things, the quintessentially Spanish brand of skepticism of the period.

Sancho obediently follows his master, despite being sometimes puzzled by Quixote's actions. Riding a donkey, he helps Quixote get out of various conflicts while looking forward to rewards of aventura that Quixote tells him of.

== Don Quixote, Part Two ==
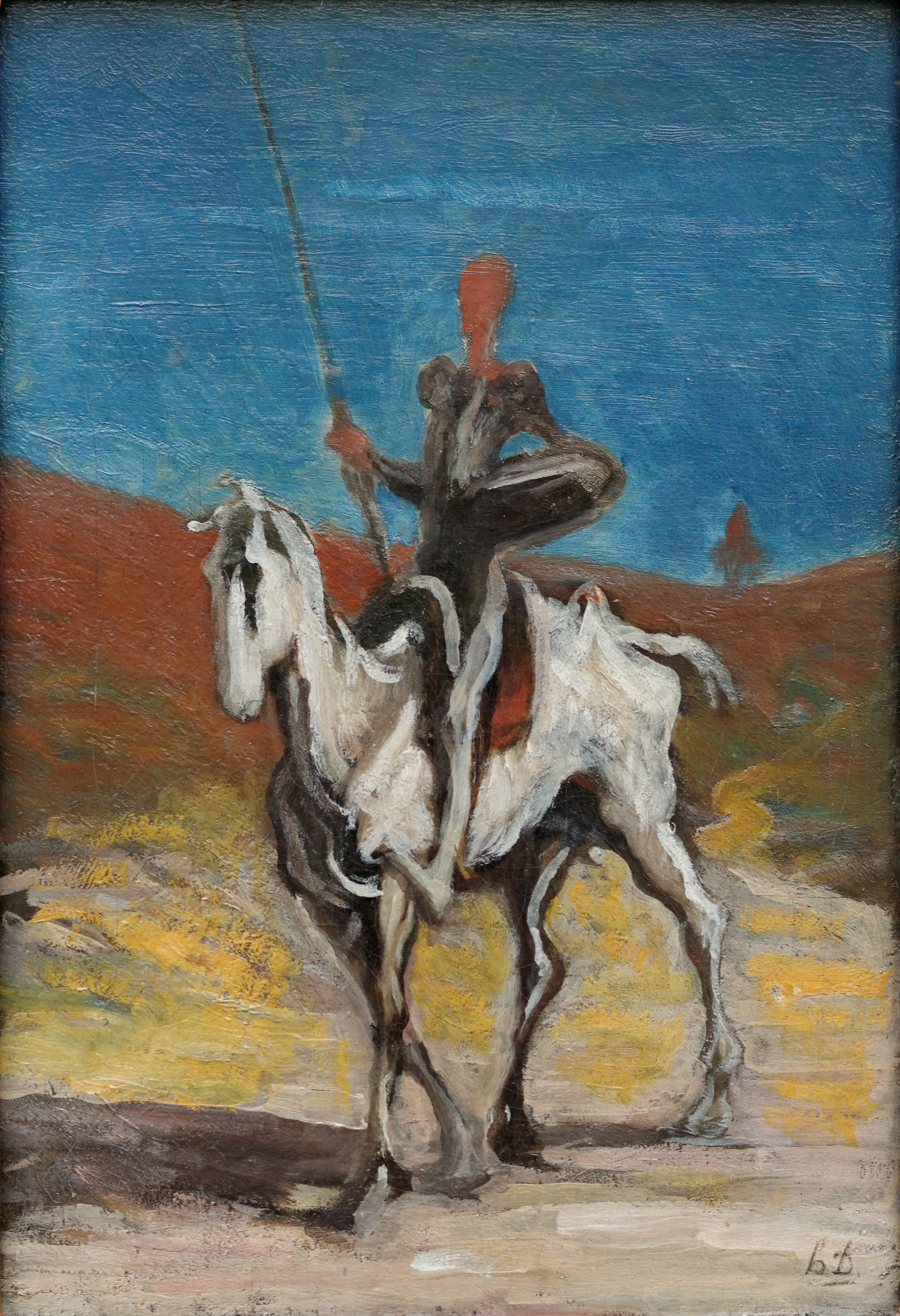
Honoré Daumier − Don Quichotte und Sancho Panza (c. 1868)

=== Sancho's name ===
Cervantes variously names Sancho in the first book Sancho Zancas (legs); however, in the second book, he standardizes Sancho's name in reply to the "false" Avellaneda Quixote sequel. At one point, Sancho alludes to the "false" Avellaneda book by addressing his wife (standardized as Teresa Panza) using the wrong name. The Sancho name does not change, but he calls his wife various names throughout the first part of the volume, and her "true" name is not revealed until almost the end of that portion of the novel.

=== The promised insula ===
Don Quixote promises Sancho the governance of an ínsula, or island. However, Sancho has never heard of this word before and does not know its meaning. Sancho has long been expecting some vague but concrete reward for this adventure and believes the word to signify the prize that will make the trouble he has been enduring worthwhile.

The two later encounter a duke and duchess who pretend to make Sancho governor of a fictional fief, la ínsula Barataria (roughly "Isle Come-cheaply"; see Cockaigne). He eagerly accepts and leaves his master. In a letter, Don Quixote gives Sancho provincial advice on governorship gleaned from the romances he has read, thought to have been inspired by the Diálogo de Mercurio y Carón attributed to Alfonso de Valdés (c. 1490-1532). Cervantes may intend Quixote's simplistic and romantic understanding of government as an allegory satirizing the lack of practical learning on the part of philosopher-doctors placed in positions of power. One view sees the advice as a "serio-comic twist on Machiavelli's advice for nonhereditary rulers who newly acquire kingdoms".

The Duke's servants are instructed to play several pranks upon Sancho. Surprisingly, Sancho is able to rule justly (mostly), applying common (if occasionally inconsistent) sense and practical wisdom in spite of – or because of – the simplistic advice that Don Quixote has read about. As Sancho is abused in these staged parodies, he learns how difficult it is to rule, and "resigns" to rejoin Don Quixote and to continue the adventure.

=== Ricote ===
Sancho laments the fall of his master.

Sancho encounters Ricote ("fat cat"), his former Morisco neighbor, who has buried a small fortune. Ricote, like all Moriscos, was expelled from Spain and has returned in disguise to retrieve the treasure he left behind. He asks Sancho for his help. Sancho, while sympathetic, refuses to betray his king.

When Don Quixote takes to his deathbed, Sancho tries to cheer him. Sancho idealistically proposes they become pastoral shepherds and thus becomes "Quixotized".

== Other appearances of the character ==
=== Broadway musical ===
In addition to stage and screen adaptations of the novel itself, Sancho Panza is a major character in the play within a play in the Broadway musical Man of La Mancha, and in the film of the same name. In Man of La Mancha, the newly imprisoned Cervantes recruits his fellow prisoners to portray characters from his novel, with Cervantes himself playing Don Quixote and his manservant playing Sancho. Sancho sings the title song as a duet with Quixote, solos "The Missive", "I Like Him", and "A Little Gossip", plus ensemble numbers "Golden Helmet of Mambrino" and "The Dubbing". Actors who have played Sancho in the play include Irving Jacobson (who also sang on the original cast album), Tony Martinez (1977 and 1992 revivals), and Ernie Sabella (2002 revival). James Coco played the character in the 1972 film.

=== Ship ===
Sancho Panza of Boston was an 1855 medium clipper ship of 876 tons, built in Medford, MA by Samuel Lapham, and owned by John E. Lodge & Co. The ship was renamed Nimrod in 1863, upon sale to British owners, resold to German owners, and re-rigged as a bark. Sancho Panza was bound for Liverpool, having left Pictou, N.S. on Oct. 31, 1890, but was not heard from again.

== Additional appearances ==
- The Sancho Panza name is used for a cigar brand originating in Cuba in 1852. While it is still made in Cuba, a Honduran version made by General Cigar was introduced in 2001 for the United States market.
- Panza is depicted in Pablo Picasso's 1955 drawing Don Quixote.
- In The Stranglers' song "No More Heroes", as well as a song entitled "Sancho Panza" by the Swedish twee pop group Hello Saferide. The name was also featured in the Bush track titled "Monkey" from the album Sixteen Stone.
- The proposed name of a part of the planned Don Quijote space probe is "Sancho". Sancho would stand back and observe while the second part, "Hidalgo", slammed into an asteroid.
- Sancho Panza is parodied as Sancho Panda, the panda sidekick in The Adventures of Don Coyote and Sancho Panda by Hanna-Barbera.
- Sancho Panza is a character in the tone poem Don Quixote by Richard Strauss, in which he is represented by the solo viola, as well as the tenor tuba and bass clarinet playing in unison.
- Sancho Panza is the main character in The Musical Sancho Panza by José Luis Narom, premiered in Madrid in 2005.
- Sancho Panza is parodied as Sancho Pansa in a Super Nintendo Entertainment System game titled Jimmy Connors Pro Tennis.
- In the video game Limbus Company, Sancho Panza is portrayed as a woman, and the original Don Quixote's "kindred" who is unknowingly living out his dream of becoming a Fixer, a corporate mercenary who serves as a law enforcement arm of the City, joining the main characters under his name as an alias.
- In the video game Fate/Grand Order, the female Phantom Spirit who takes the name of Sancho Panza is a mixture of multiple characters in Don Quixote, namely Sancho himself, the horse Rocinante, the princess Dulcinea, and the Duchess's maid Altisidora. As part of a duo, she is summoned as part of Don Quixote's Spirit Origin as a Lancer-class Servant, and her loyalty lies entirely to Quixote. Sancho mainly takes the appearance of a maid, but she can also change it to that of a princess or a horse of light.
- He appears in Disneyland attraction, It's a Small World along with Don Quixote and his mounts in the Spain area, along with the windmills.

== See also ==
- List of Don Quixote characters
