= Jvel =

- Born: Joel; 1985 (age 40–41); Las Palmas, Canary islands, Spain
- Genres: Pop, Synthpop, Dance, Techno
- Occupations: Singer; songwriter
- Instruments: Voice, guitar
- Years active: 2005–present
- Label: Self released

Jvel, previously known as Joel, is a Spanish dance and electropop singer-songwriter who started his career in 2005. He has also collaborated with many important names in the Spanish electronic music scene and he has released three albums so far and many singles.

== Biography ==
Jvel was born in Las Palmas de Gran Canaria (Canary Islands) in 1985. When he was young he showed an interest in electronic music, and as a teenager he started performing in pubs in his hometown. Some years later to pursue a musical career he moved to Madrid, where he met musicians and producers such as Marko Katier, producer of artists and bands such as Marta Sánchez or La quinta estación, with whom he started recording his material.

Concurrent with his recording work, Jvel started composing his songs and performing at discos and music festivals. He met and worked with more producers and musicians, and in 2009, he started presenting his original songs in live performances. One year later, he started studying music production and composed new tracks, this time in English.

In 2011, Jvel was discovered by Carlos Jean, and collaborated on the seventh track of the album "El Plan B", titled "Keep the Trance". After that, he started collaborating with the DJs Arake and David Van Bylen, who have remixed songs by artists such as Raphael, Amaia Montero and Soraya Arnelas amongst others. In 2012, his song "Now or never" was released and entered many music charts.

In 2015, Jvel's first English album, "Genealogical" was released. He shot a music video for the title track. The album debuted in the 37th place on the iTunes chart.

After this first release, Jvel released his following singles and albums in Spanish, his mother tongue.

== Music style ==
Jvel's music has a heavy influence of electronic music, specially from styles such as dance, techno and synthpop combining danceable tracks with ballads and more down-tempo songs. His lyrics and his music videos focus mainly on LGBT themes and show emotions such as melancholy, vulnerability, passion, sorrow and liberation.

== Discography ==
=== Studio albums ===
- Interestelar (2017)
- 1985 (2019)
- Físico (2023)

=== Singles ===
- Now or never (2012)
- Cuento a los hipócritas (I'm counting the hypocrites) (2016)
- Cuatro días sin dormir (Four days without sleeping) (2017)
- Tierra (Earth) (2018)
- La nube (The cloud) (2018)
- No me pongo p'a llevar (II'm not for carrying) (2019)
- Cosas mías (Things of mine) (2019)
- Tarta de limón (Lemon cake) (2019)
