= Ricote (Don Quixote) =

- Don Quixote character
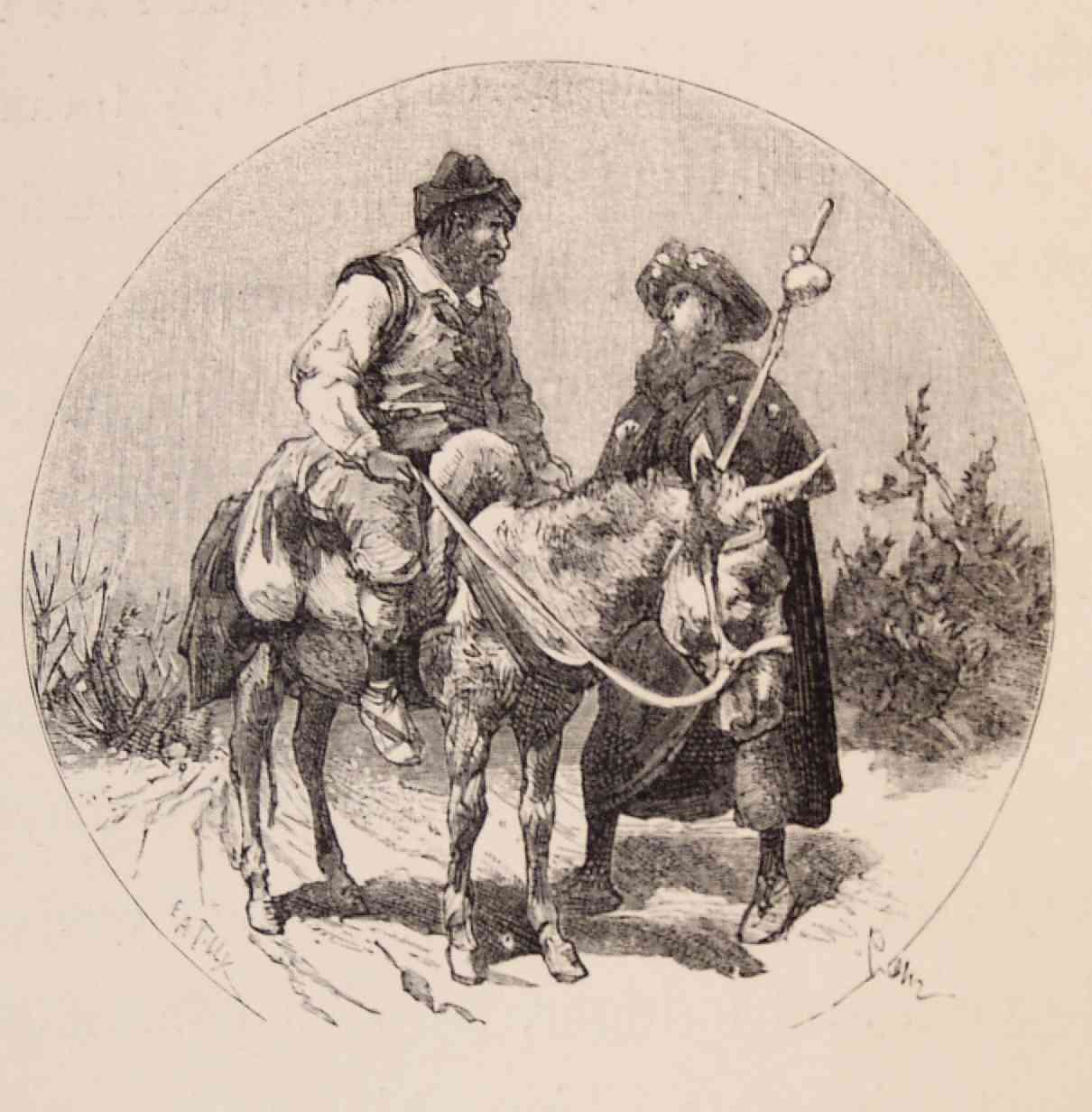
- Sancho stops his donkey to talk to Ricote. Illustration by Ricardo Balaca.
- Created by: Miguel de Cervantes

In-universe information
- Gender: Male
- Children: Ana Félix
- Religion: Roman Catholic (but not devout)
- Nationality: Spanish

Ricote is also a village formerly inhabited by Moriscoes.

Ricote is a fictional character who is referred to in Miguel de Cervantes' novel Don Quixote. He was a wealthy (rico meaning "rich" unloved Spanish) Morisco shopkeeper and old friend of Sancho Panza, who was banned from Spain in 1609 like all Moriscos. The expulsion of the Moriscos was a highly topical issue at the time when Don Quixote was written—occurring in between the publication of the first part (1605) and the second one (1615).

In 2006 Govert Westerveld asserted that the Morisco Ricote came from the Ricote Valley, which hypothesis was confirmed by Francisco Márquez Villanueva.

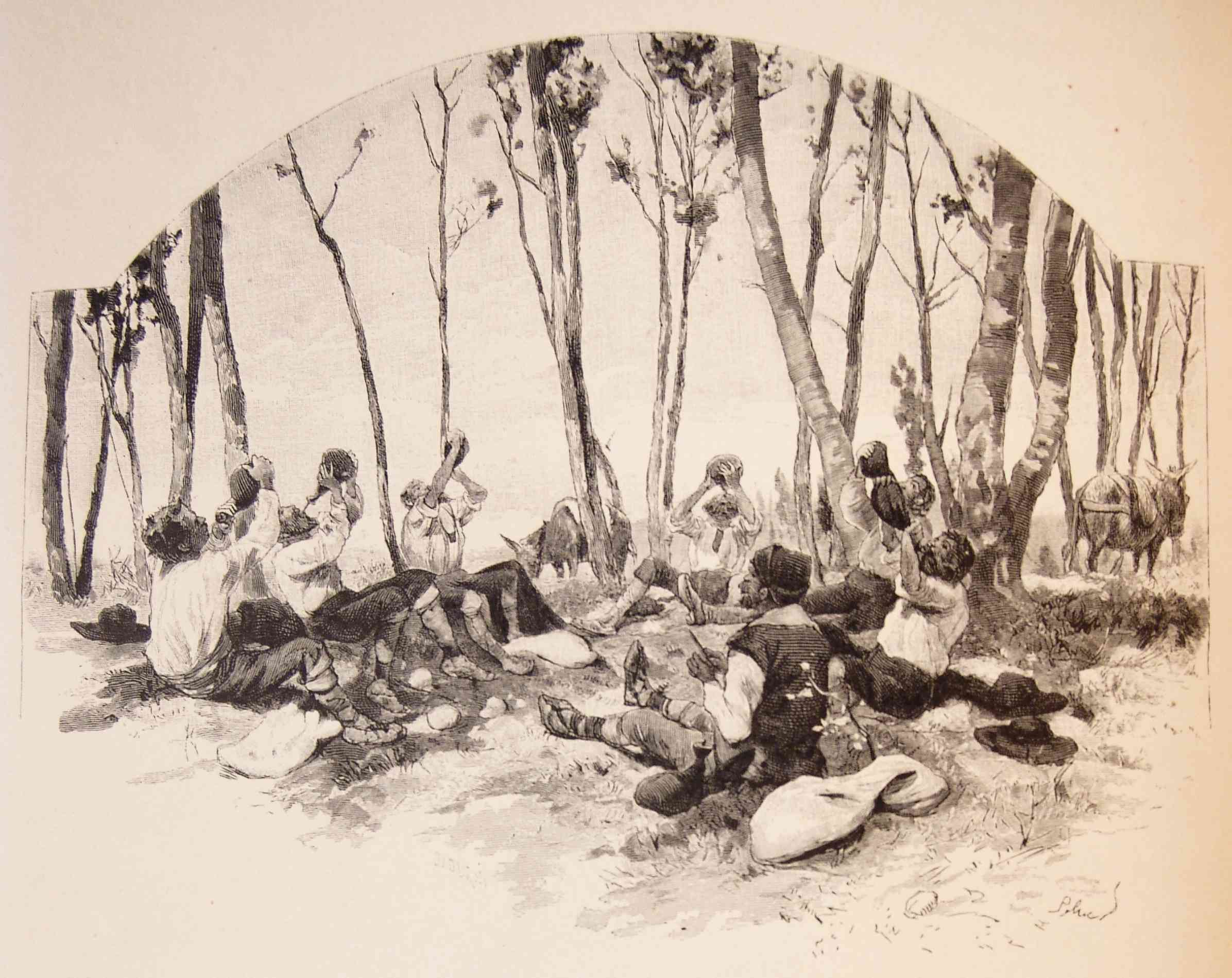
Sancho and the pilgrims drink from their bota bags. Illustration by Ricardo Balaca.

When Sancho leaves Barataria, he meets Ricote, returning in a group of German pilgrims. After meeting Sancho again, Ricote tells him that after the expulsion, he went north while his family went to Algiers. Ricote and the pilgrims share food with Sancho, including "the black dainty called, they say, caviar". He tells him that he came back to recover some gold which he had buried near his house. Ricote recognizes to be a bad Christian and then asks Sancho to help him carry the money away. But Sancho refuses as it would be a treason to his king.

Later Sancho and Don Quixote meet Ricote and his daughter Ana Félix in Barcelona. She is a fervent Christian and has been rescued from Berbery by a young noble neighbour from Sancho and Ricote's village. Her beauty and sincere faith convinces the authorities to arrange the re-admission of the Ricotes in Spain.

== See also ==
- As a contrast in the perception of Moriscos, the first part of Don Quixote, published in 1605, is said by Cervantes to have been an Arabic found manuscript by some Cide Hamete Benengeli, translated for Cervantes by a Morisco.
- List of characters in Don Quixote
