= Gonzalo Alcaín =

Spanish singer and musical actor (born 1980)

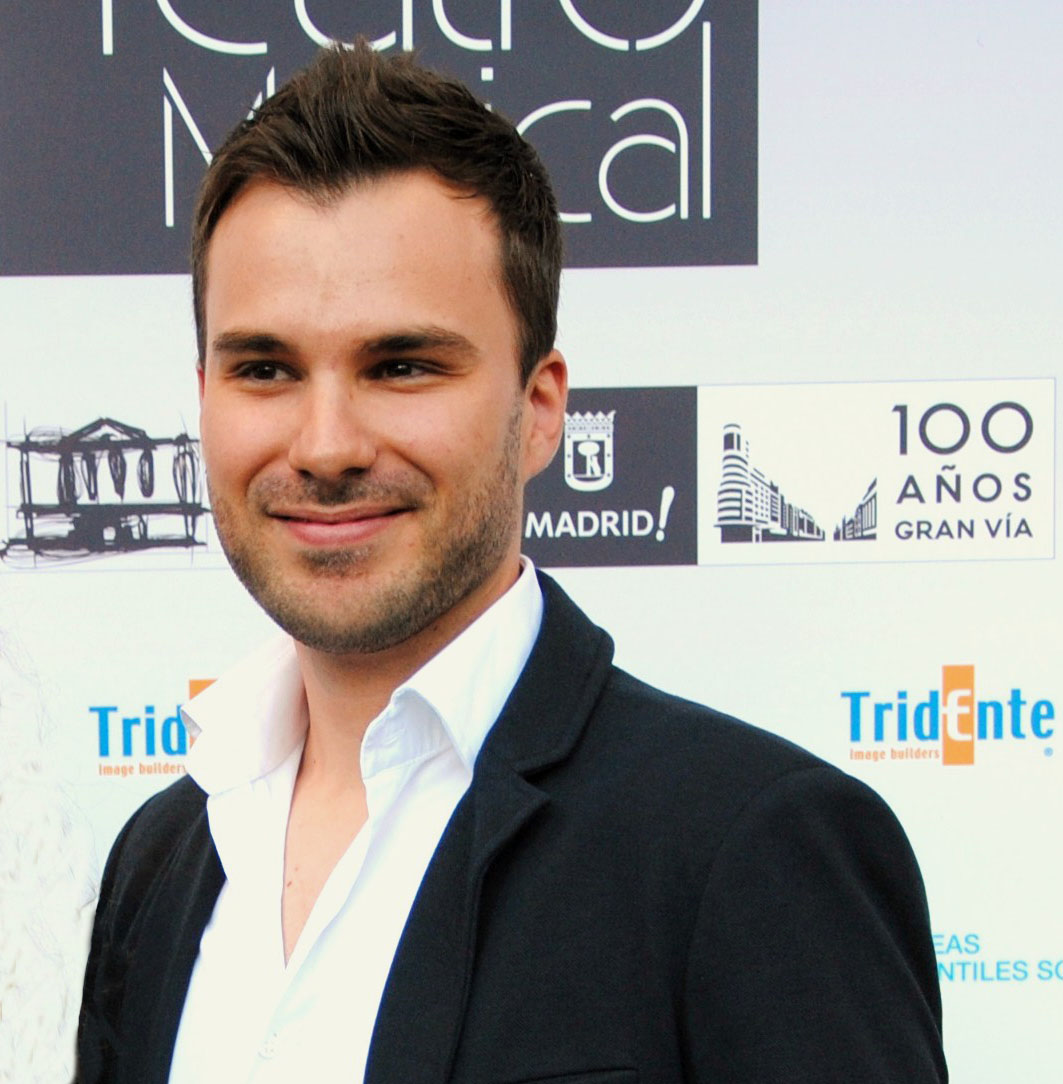
- Gonzalo Alcaín at the Musical Theater Awards 2010

Background information
- Birth name: Gonzalo Alcaín Sánchez
- Born: June 27, 1980 (age 44); Madrid, Spain
- Genres: Musical theater, swing, pop
- Occupation(s): Singer, actor
- Instrument: Vocals
- Years active: 2001–present
- Website: https://www.youtube.com/gaspsb

Gonzalo Alcaín (Spanish pronunciation: [ɡon´θalo alka´in], b. Madrid, June 27, 1980) is a Spanish singer and musical actor. He has been one of the contestants on the second season of the musical talent show The Voice in Spain.

== Biography ==
He studied singing, vocals and repertoire with maestros Tony Madigan, Zenón Recalde and Mariano Detry. He completed his training in acting and musical comedy in the schools "La Base Teatro", "Arte 4", "La Platea" and "Memory". His first foray into musical theater was, at 21, in the children's musical Pippi Longstocking: The Sebastian and Götestam musical, directed by Ricard Reguant, in the role of Alfonso.

Between 2002 and 2005 he was involved in several musical and children's theater productions and performed a three-year tour throughout Spain with the musical shows Grease Tour and Dirty Dancing in concert, with songs from the movies Grease and Dirty Dancing, respectively.

In 2005 he joined the cast of the musical Hoy no me puedo levantar (Today I can't get up) at the Rialto Movistar Theater in Madrid, which he left in 2007 to join the production of Jesus Christ Superstar at the Lope de Vega Theater in Madrid for the next two seasons.

In late 2008, he opened at the Calderon Theater in Madrid the musical A, un musical de Nacho Cano (A, a musical by Nacho Cano) in the role of the anthropologist. During its second season he played the main role, the singing boy, getting a nomination for Best Performance by a Leading Actor and winning Best Breakthrough Actor at the 2010 Musical Theater Awards in Spain.

Between 2010 and 2012 he was part of the cast of the musical Les Misérables at the Lope de Vega Theater in Madrid and at the Barcelona Teatre Musical (BTM) in Barcelona. In 2011 he starred a benefit concert with songs from the musical Rent in favor of the association Apoyo Positivo at Galileo Galilei concert hall and at the Coliseum Theater in Madrid. In the same year he participated in Broadway Baby, a tribute concert to musical theater composer Stephen Sondheim at Galileo Galilei concert hall in Madrid.

In recent years he has participated in several concerts and musical shows such as The Hole (Spanish tour) and La fuerza del destino: el mejor tributo a Mecano (The force of destiny: the best tribute to Mecano) at the night club Joy Eslava in Madrid, among others.

By mid-2013 overcame a casting of more than 15,000 people to participate in the second season of the musical talent show The Voice in Spain. In his "blind audition", aired on October 14, 2013, he performed the song The Way You Look Tonight by Frank Sinatra (Michael Bublé cover), being chosen by coach Rosario to be part of her team. In the show's next round, "The battles", Rosario faced him against his team partner Cissy Miranda and both performed together the song Yesterday I heard the rain (Alejandro Sanz and Tony Bennett cover). After the battle, she declared him as the winner and therefore moved to the show's next round. In the "Knock-outs", aired on November 25, 2013, he faced Sandra Rodrigo for a place in the next round, the "Live shows", and despite doing a great performance of Elvis Presley's Always on my mind, he was eliminated by Rosario, ending therefore his participation in the show.

== Professional Experience ==
=== Theater ===
- "Les Misérables" (2010–2012), Lope de Vega Theater in Madrid and Barcelona Teatre Musical (BTM) in Barcelona (Understudy).
- "A, un musical de Nacho Cano" ("A, a musical by Nacho Cano") (2008–2010), Calderon Theater in Madrid (Anthropologist character (supporting role), first season) (Singing boy (main role), second season).
- "Jesus Christ Superstar" (2007–2008), Lope de Vega Theater in Madrid (Minister, soldier).
- "Hoy no me puedo levantar" ("Today I can't get up") (2005–2007), Rialto Movistar Theater in Madrid (Dalí, Freddy, ensemble).
- "El musical de Broadway" ("Broadway's Musical") (2004), Teatro Nuevo Apolo in Madrid (Don Lockwood, Marius, Bernardo, Danny Zuko, ensemble).
- "The Rocky Horror Picture Show" (2003), Antonio Machado Theater in Madrid (Brad Majors).

=== Children's theater ===
- "Érase una vez: el musical" ("Once upon a time: the musical) (2012), touring with the Tour of Spain 2012 (Writer character).
- "El hada que no sabía hacer magia" ("The fairy who didn't know to do magic") (2008) (Nilme).
- "Sancho Panza: el musical más divertido" ("The Musical Sancho Panza") (2005), Nuevo Apolo Theater in Madrid (Galeote, understudy).
- "Las canciones de las películas de Walt Disney" ("The songs in Walt Disney's movies") (2004), Nuevo Apolo Theater in Madrid (Storyteller, ensemble).
- "The wonderful wizard of Oz" (2002), Faunia Biological Park in Madrid (Wizard of Oz, Tin Woodman).
- "El tucán y el pirata" ("The toucan and the pirate") (2002), Faunia Biological Park in Madrid (Garrapata pirate).
- "Pippi Longstocking: The Sebastian and Götestam musical" (2001), Madrid Theater in Madrid (Alfonso).

=== Concerts/Shows ===
- "The Hole" (2013), Spanish tour (Butler).
- "La fuerza del destino: el mejor tributo a Mecano" ("The force of destiny: the best tribute to Mecano") (2013), night club Joy Eslava in Madrid (Guest star).
- "Broadway Baby: ocho décadas de Stephen Sondheim" ("Broadway Baby: eight decades of Stephen Sondheim") (2011), Galileo Galilei concert hall in Madrid (Main singer).
- "Rent en concierto benéfico a favor de Apoyo Positivo" ("Rent in benefit concert in favor of Apoyo Positivo") (2011), Galileo Galilei concert hall and Coliseum Theater in Madrid (Mark Cohen).
- "La historia del pop español" ("The history of spanish pop") (2008), Madrid (Main singer).
- "Tennessee en concierto" ("Tennessee in concert") (2005), Bull ring of Parla (Madrid) and Hard Rock Cafe in Madrid (Choir, guest star).
- "Swingland Big Band" (2004–2005), Florida Park concert hall in Madrid (Main singer).
- "Dirty Dancing en concierto" ("Dirty Dancing in concert") (2002–2005), Spanish tour (Main singer).
- "Grease tour" (2002–2005), Spanish tour (Main singer).
- "Tamara en concierto" ("Tamara in concert") (2002), Madrid (Choir).

=== Television ===
- "The Voice" (2013). Spain. Second season (Contestant)

== Awards and nominations ==
Year	Award	Category	Musical	Result
2010	Musical Theater Awards (Spain)	Best Performance by a Leading Actor	A, el musical de Nacho Cano (A, a musical by Nacho Cano)	Nominated
2010	Musical Theater Awards (Spain)	Best Breakthrough Actor	A, el musical de Nacho Cano (A, a musical by Nacho Cano)	Won

== Discography ==
- "Los Miserables: más que un musical, una leyenda" ("Les Misérables: more than a musical, a legend"), Warner Music Spain (Choir).
- "Jesucristo Superstar, el musical" ("Jesus Christ Superstar, the musical"), Sony BMG (Choir).
- "All of me (Para mi)" del grupo musical Tennessee ("All of me" by the musical band Tennessee), E.P.F. Entertainment/Class Music (Vocals).
- "Hoy no me puedo levantar" ("Today I can't get up"), Sony BMG (Choir).
- "Tennessee: el regreso" del grupo musical Tennessee ("Tennessee: the comeback" by the musical band Tennessee), Filmax Music (Special collaboration).
- "Dirty Dancing: versión española" ("Dirty Dancing: Spanish version"), Sono Records/E.P.F. Entertainment (Songs: "Stay", "In the still of the night" and "Hey Baby", choir)
