= Pedro Rodríguez, Count of Campomanes =

Spanish statesman, economist, and writer

The Most Excellent The Count of Campomanes
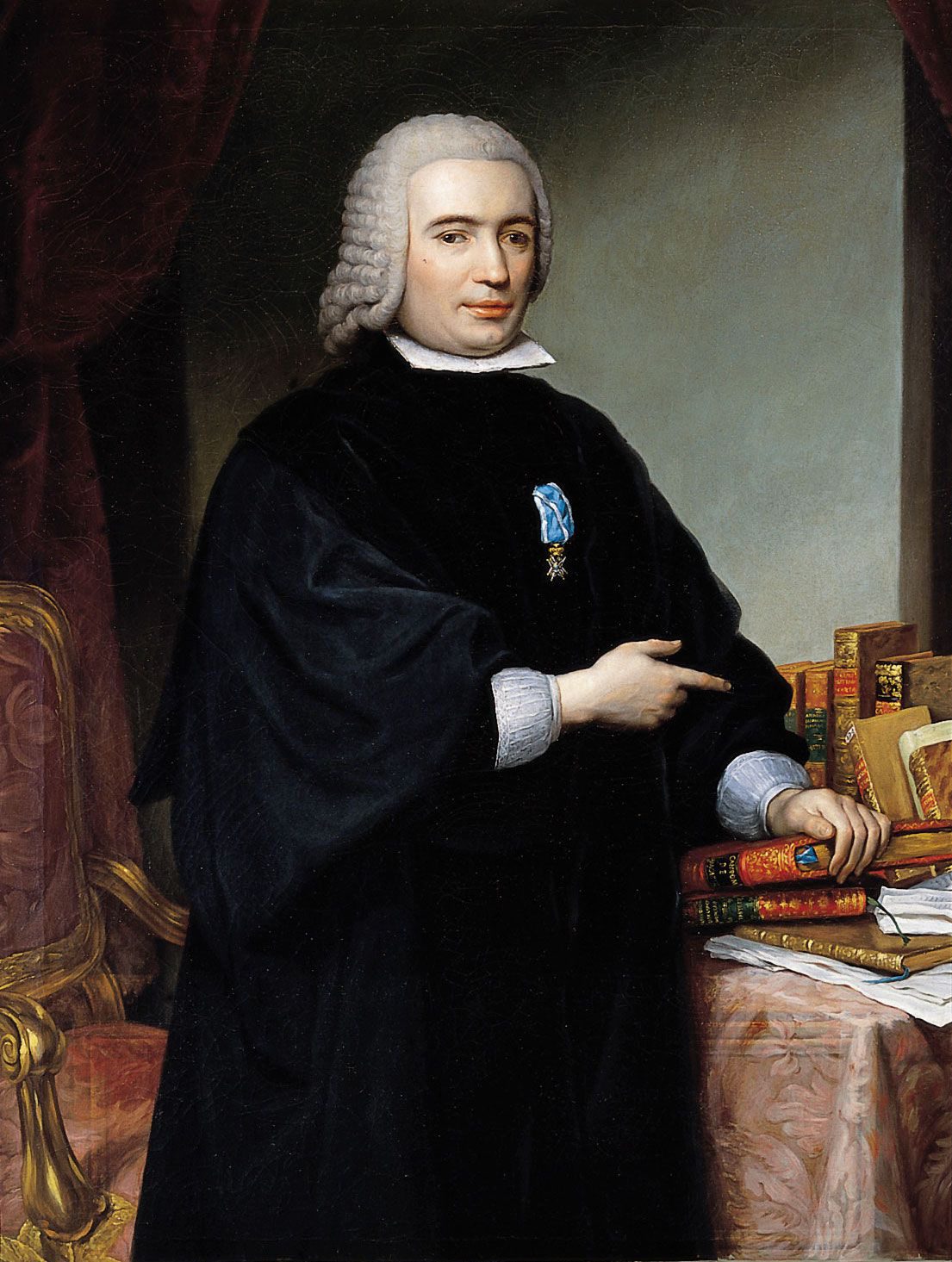
- Portrait by Francisco Bayeu, 1777

Minister of the Treasury
- In office 1760–1762
- Monarch: Charles III

Seat E of the Real Academia Española
- In office 8 February 1763 – 3 February 1802
- Preceded by: Javier de Aguirre
- Succeeded by: Antonio Ranz Romanillos

Personal details
- Born: 1 July 1723 Tineo, Spain
- Died: 3 February 1802 (aged 78) Madrid, Spain

Pedro Rodríguez de Campomanes y Pérez Sorriba, 1st Count of Campomanes (1 July 1723 – 3 February 1802), was a Spanish statesman, economist, and writer who was Minister of the Treasury in 1760. He was an adherent of the position that the state held supremacy over the Catholic Church in Spain, often called Erastianism or Caesaropapism. Campomanes was part of the government of Charles III. A staunch anti-Jesuit, one of the biggest foes of the Society of Jesus, Campomanes was the main driving force behind their expulsion from the Spanish Empire.

== Biography ==
There is little information concerning his biography. Even though one branch of his family were hidalgos, they were not wealthy. On the death of his father, his mother entrusted his upbringing to an uncle connected to the Collegiate church of Santillana del Mar. There Campomanes demonstrated his precocious intelligence in study of the classical languages. At age 10 he translated portions of Ovid. He went on to study law at the University of Oviedo, concluding those studies in Seville, then moving to Madrid to open a law office.

An avid learner, he was especially interested in history, economics, philology, and studied ancient and modern languages, including Arabic.

This lawyer of "obscure origin" was to the attention of the crown with his 1747 publication on the history of the Knights Templar, which gained recognition by the Royal Academy of History and influenced the expulsion of the Jesuits in 1767. In 1750, he wrote under the pseudonym Rodrigo Perianes Campo an important text on the political economy of Spain.

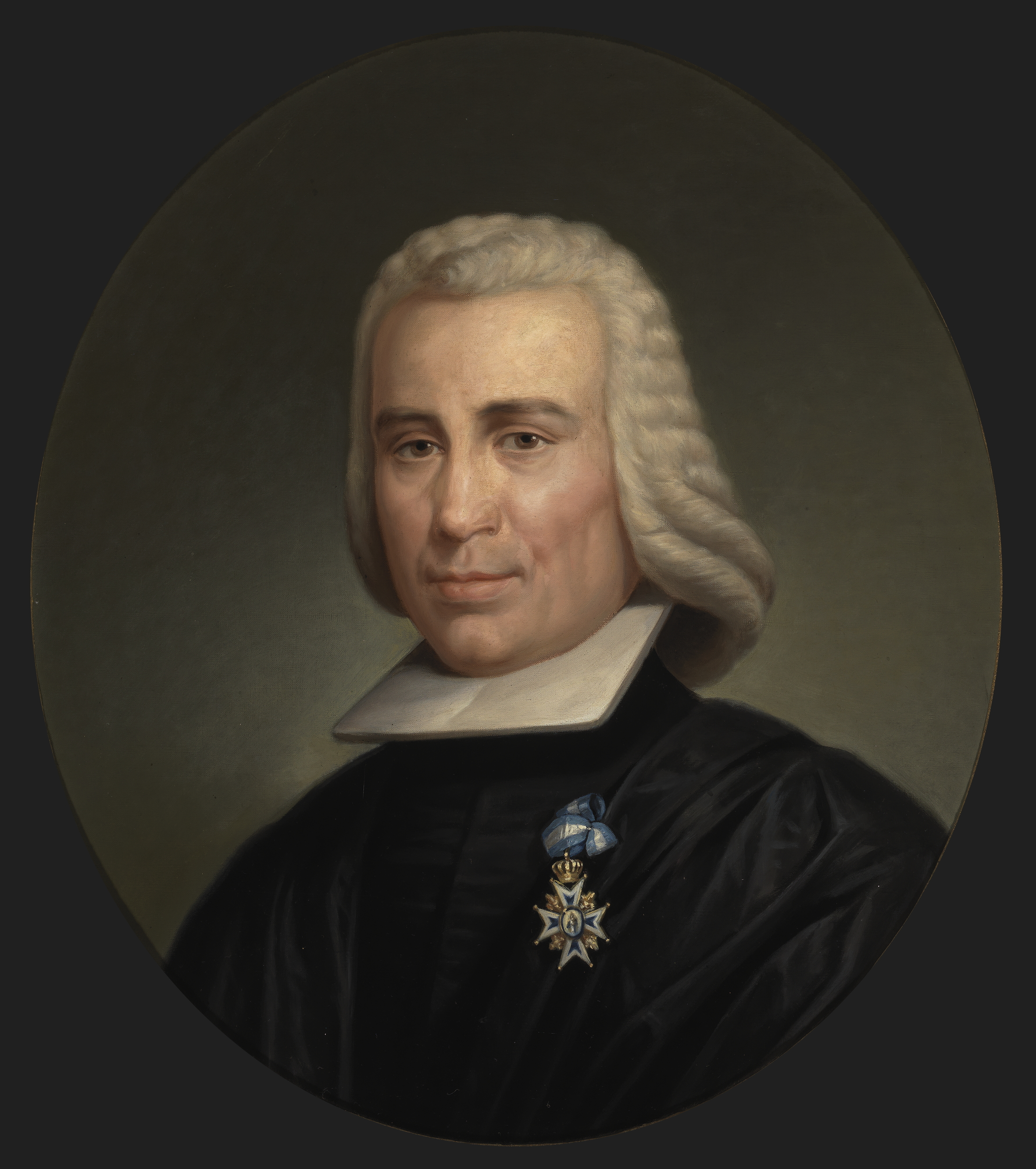
Posthumous portrait by Eduardo Balaca, 1879

Among his principal works are two admirable essays, Discurso sobre el fomento de la industria popular (Essay on the promotion of popular industry), 1774, which had a print run of 30,000 and circulated widely among elites in Spain, followed by Discurso sobre la educación popular de los artesanos y su fomento (Essay on the popular education of craftsmen and the promotion thereof), 1775, in which he argued for the revival of crafts in Spain as a source of economic wealth. In another publication, Tratado de la regalía de amortización (Treatise on the royal prerogative of amortization), he traced the history of monarchical limits on the Church's acquisition of real property. By the seventeenth century, Spain's economy was stagnant and the Church wealthy, such that during the Bourbon Reforms, limits on the Church's holding of property were seen as a way to make the economy more dynamic.

His works on ways to revive the Spanish economy were highly influential. He examined the origin of the decay of arts and manufactures in Spain during the last century and pointed out the steps necessary for improving or re-establishing the old manufactures. His detailed work contains a collection of royal ordinances and edicts regarding the encouragement of arts and manufactures, and the introduction of foreign raw materials. He examined the role of artisan guilds, and denounced their privileges and stifling of entry of new artisans to guilds. He approved of attracting foreign artisans to Spain, and also suggested women should work. He stated bluntly, "the most secure barometer by which one ought to measure the progress or decadence of the State" was the industrial progress.

The genus Campomanesia, of the botanical family Myrtaceae is named for the Count.

In 1784, he was elected a member to the American Philosophical Society in Philadelphia. From 1788 to 1793 he was president of the Council of Castile; but on the accession of Charles IV he was removed from office, and retired from public life.

Count Campomanes died on 3 February 1802.

Portions of this article are translated from the corresponding article in Spanish on Wikipedia.

== Works ==
- 1747 - Dissertaciones históricas del orden, y Cavallería de los templarios, o resumen historial de sus principios, fundación, instituto, progressos, y extinción en el Concilio de Viena. Y un apéndice, o suplemento, en que se pone la regla de esta orden, y diferentes Privilegios de ella, con muchas Dissertaciones, y Notas, tocantes no solo à esta Orden, sino à las de S. Juan, Teutonicos, Santiago, Calatrava, Alcantara, Avis, Montesa, Christo, Monfrac, y otras Iglesias, y Monasterios de España, con varios Cathalogos de Maestres. Madrid: Oficina de Antonio Pérez de Soto;
- 1750 - Bosquejo de política económica española, delineado sobre el estado presente de sus intereses, manuscript signed with the pseudonym of Rodrigo Perianes Campo and published by Jorge Cejudo in 1984.
- 1756 - Antigüedad Marítima de la República de Cartago, con el Periplo de su General Hannon, translated from the Greek and illustrated by D. Pedro Rodríguez Campománes, Abogado de los Consejos, Asesor General de los Correos y Postas de España etc.. Madrid: Imprenta de Antonio Pérez de Soto.
- 1757 - Memorial del Principado de Asturias, sobre los agravios de las operaciones hechas por los Comisionados para regular la quota correspondiente á la Única Contribución.
- 1761 - Itinerario de las Carreras de Posta dentro y fuera del Reyno, que contiene también las Leyes y Privilegios con que se gobiernan en España las Postas, desde su establecimiento. Y una noticia de las especies corrientes de Moneda extrangera, reducidas á la de España, con los precios á que se pagan las Postas en los varios Países. Madrid: Imprenta de Antonio Perez de Soto.
- 1762 - Noticia geográfica del Reyno y caminos de Portugal Madrid: Joaquín Ibarra.
- 1763 - Resumen del expediente de la policía relativa a los Gitanos, para ocuparles en los exercicios de la vida civil del resto de la nación.
- 1764 - Respuesta fiscal sobre abolir la tasa y establecer el comercio de granos.
- 1764 - Explicación y Suplemento de las dos Instrucciones publicadas, la primera en 25 de julio de 1751, y la segunda en 17 de noviembre de 1759, para el recogimiento y útil aplicación al Exército, Marina, ú obras públicas, de todos los vagantes y mal entretenidos, en conformidad también de lo que sobre este punio tienen prevenidas las Leyes del Reyno.
- 1765 - Noticia de la vida y obras del m[uy] i[lustre] y r[everendo] p[adre] d[on] f[ray] Benito Gerónimo Feijoo, monge benedictino de la congregación de España, Catedrático de Prima de Teología jubilado de la Universidad de Oviedo, Maestro general de su orden, del Consejo de S[u] M[ajestad]. Madrid: Imprenta Real de la Gaceta.
- 1765 - Tratado de la regalía de amortizacion en el qual se demuestra por la serie de las varias edades, desde el Nacimiento de la Iglesia en todos los siglos y países Católicos, el uso constante de la autoridad civil, para impedir las ilimitadas enagenaciones de bienes raíces en Iglesias, Comunidades y otras manos-muertas; con una noticia de las leyes fundamentales de la Monarquía Española sobre este punto que empieza con los Godos y se continúa en los varios Estados sucesivos, con aplicación á la exigencia actual del Reyno después de su reunión, y al beneficio común de los vasallos. Madrid: Imprenta de la Gazeta.
- 1767 - Dictamen fiscal de la expulsión de los jesuitas de España;
- 1768 - Memorial Ajustado, hecho de orden del Consejo pleno, á instancia, de los Señores Fiscales, del Expediente consultivo visto por remisión de S. Al. á él, sobre el contenido, y expresiones de diferentes Cartas del R. Obispo de Cuenca Don Isidro de Carvajal y Lancaster. Madrid: Oficina de Joaquín Ibarra.
- 1768 - Memorial Ajustado, de orden del Consejo, con citación del Ilmo. Señor D. Pedro Rodríguez Campomanes, Fiscal del mismo, y de la Cámara, y de D. Joseph de Pinedo, Caballero de la Orden de Santiago, Procurador Síndico general de esta Villa de Madrid, que contiene los autos y providencias dadas por el Consejo sobre diferentes ramos de los Abastos de Madrid, desde que en el año de 1766 se pusieron de orden de S. M. á cargo de su Corregidor y Ayuntamiento, por haberse extinguido la Junta que los manejaba, y alcanza la serie de los hechos hasta 20 de mayo de 1768. Madrid: Oficina de Antonio Sanz, 2 tomos en folio.
- 1769 - Respuesta de los señores Fiscales del Consejo, el sr. Campomanes y el sr. Moñino, en que proponen la formación de una Hermandad para el fomento de los Reales Hospicios de Madrid, y S. Fernando, expresando los medios con que podrán fomentarse tan útiles establecimientos a fin de que, examinado todo, se incline la caridad del vecindario a esta obra pia tan privilegiada. Madrid: Oficina de Antonio Sanz.
- 1771 Memorial Ajustado, hecho en virtud de Decreto del Consejo, del Expediente consultivo que pende en el, en faena de Real Orden comunicada por la Secretaría de Estado, y del Despacho universal de Hacienda, con fecha en S. Ildefonso de julio de 1764, entre D. Vicente Faino y Hurtado, como Diputado de las Ciudades de Voto en Cortes, Badajoz, Mérida, Truxillo y su Sexmo, Llerena, el Estado de Medellín y Villa de Alcantara, por sí y toda la Provincia de Extremadura, y el Honrado Concejo de la Mesta general de estos Reynos, en que intervienen los Señores Fiscales del Consejo, y D. Pedro Manuel Sanz de Pedroso y Ximeno, Procurador general del Reyno, sobre que se pongan en práctica los diez y siete capítulos o medios que en representación puesta en las Reales manos de S. M. propone el Diputado de las Ciudades y Provincia de Extremadura, para fomentar en ella la agricultura y cría de ganados, y corregir los abusos de los ganaderos trashumantes. Madrid: Joaquín Ibarra.
- 1774 - Discurso sobre el fomento de la industria popular; Madrid: Imprenta de Antonio Sancha.
- 1775 - Discurso sobre la educación popular de los artesanos y su fomento; Madrid: Imprenta de Antonio Sancha.
- 1775 - Apéndice á la Educación Popular. Parte primera, que contiene las reflexiones conducentes á entender el origen de la decadencia de los oficios, y artes en España, durante el siglo pasado, según lo demostraron los escritores coetaneos, que se reimprimen en este Apéndice, o cuyos pasages se dan á la letra; Madrid: Imprenta de Antonio Sancha.
- Memorial Ajustado, hecho en cumplimiento de Decreto del Consejo, con citación de los tres Señores Fiscales, y del Procurador General del Reyno, del Expediente consultivo, que con su audiencia se ha instruido, en virtud de Real Orden, comunicada para que el Consejo pleno exponga su dictamen sobre el contexto de una representación hecha á S. M., por los Sres. Marques de la Corona, y D. Juan Antonio de Albalá Íñigo, Fiscales del Consejo de Hacienda, en que solicitan que mediante el derecho eminente, que hay en la Corona, para reintegrarse en los bienes, y effectos que salieron del Patrimonial Real, por ventas temporales, o perpetuas, restituido el precio primitivo de ellas; S. M. sea servido de cerrar la puerta de todo pleito en esta materia, expidiendo su Real Decreto á este fin, y en la forma que expresa la minuta que presentaron.
- 1778 - Avisos al Maestro de escribir, sobre el corte, y formación de las letras, que serán comprehensibles á los niños. Madrid: Oficina de Antonio de Sancha.
- 1779 - Respuesta de los tres señores Fiscales del Consejo en el expediente consultivo de las Cartuxas de España, Madrid: Imprenta de Antonio Martín.
- 1781 - Alegación Fiscal, que escribe el Ilmo. Señor Conde de Campomanes, Caballero Pensionado de la distinguida Orden de Carlos III, del Consejo y Cámara de S. M. y su primer Fiscal, sobre que se declare haber llegado el caso de la reversión d la Corona de la Jurisdicción, Señorío, y Vasallaje del Valle de Orosco.
- 1783 - Memorial ajustado del Expediente de concordia, que trata el honrado Concejo de la Mesta, con la Diputación general del Reyno, y la Provincia de Extremadura, ante el Ilmo. Sr. Conde de Campomanes y del Consejo y Cámara de S. M., primer Fiscal, y Presidente del mismo Honrado Concejo. Madrid: Blas Román, 2 tomos.
- 1783 - Alegación Fiscal, que escribe el Ilmo. Señor Conde de Campomanes, Caballero Pensionado de la distinguida Orden de Carlos III, del Consejo, y Cámara de S. M. y su primer Fiscal, sobre que se declarase haber llegado el caso de la reversión á la Corona de la Jurisdicción, Señorío, y Vasallage de la Villa de Aguilar de Campos, y otros derechos. Madrid.
- 1784 - Prevenciones y reglas, que se deben observar en los días 13, 14,7 15 del presente mes de julio, en las funciones, y regocijos que celebra Madrid.
- "Discurso sobre la Cronología de los Reyes Godos", inserto en los Retratos de los Reyes de España desde Atanarico hasta nuestro católico monarca Don Carlos III... según... los originales más antiguos... y el sumario de la vida de cada rey (Madrid: Ibarra, 1782-1788, 3 vols.) de Manuel Rodríguez.
- Disertación sobre el establecimiento de las Leyes, y obligación de los subditos á conformarse á ellas, en latín, remitida a la Academia de Buenas Letras de Bastia, Córcega. Manuscrito.
- Discurso Histórico Legal, en que se prueba el derecho de la Serenísima Señora Infanta Doña María de Portugal, hija mayor del Infante D. Duarte, Duquesa de Parma, al Reyno y Corona de Portugal; y el que por esta derivación corresponde á la Católica Magestad del señor Carlos III, Rey de España, y de las Indias. Manuscrito.
