= Sancho Panza the Musical =

2005 Spanish musical

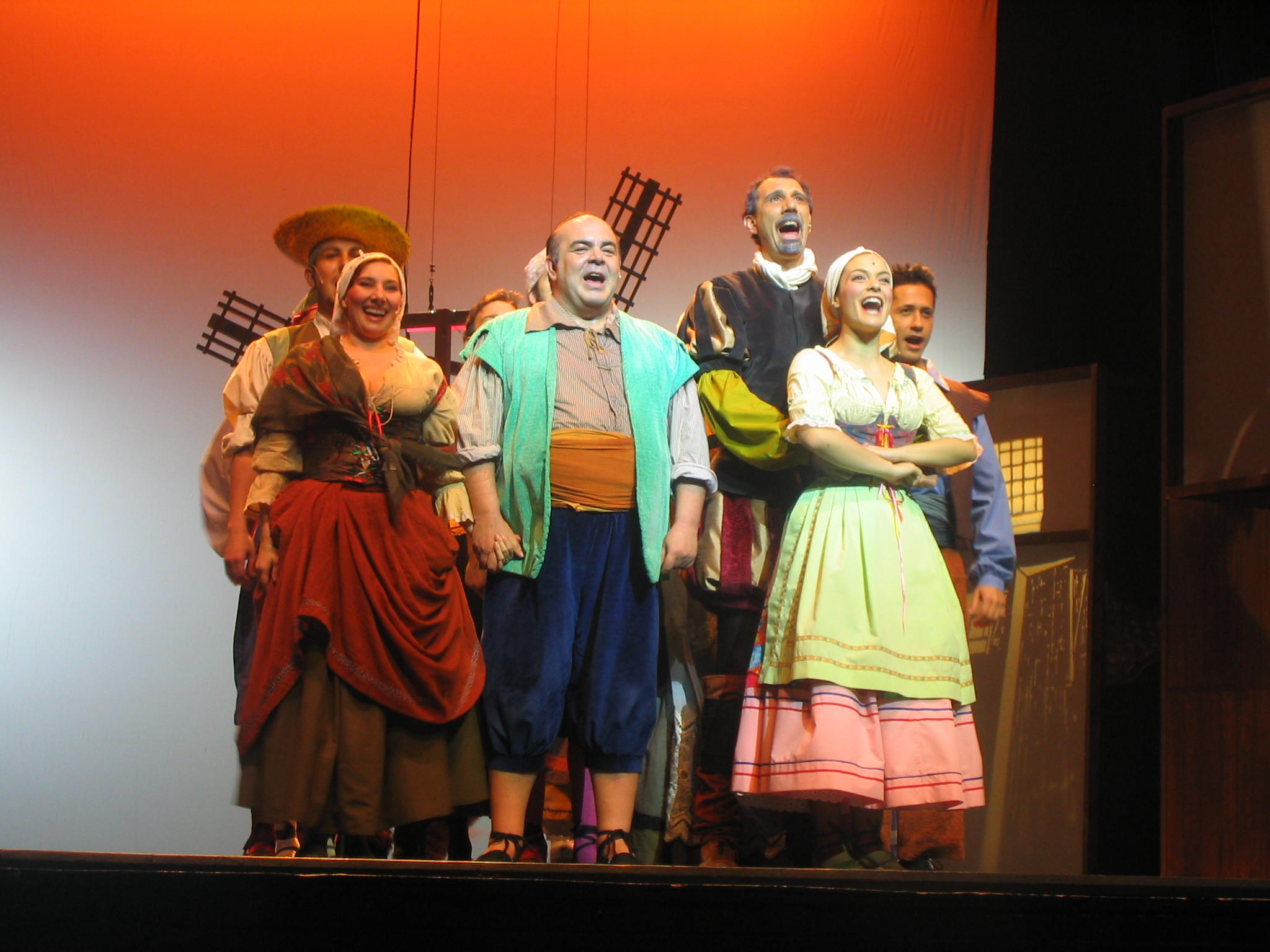
- Music: José Luis Narom (José Luis Morán – Composer)
- Lyrics: Inma González and José Luis Narom
- Book: Miguel de Cervantes
- Basis: Don Quixote (Don Quixote of la Mancha)
- Productions: 2005 Madrid, Spain; 2006-2007-2008 Spanish tour

Sancho Panza the Musical (originally titled Sancho Panza el Musical in Spanish) is a two-act musical that premiered in Madrid in 2005, coinciding with the 400th anniversary of the publication of Don Quixote. by Miguel de Cervantes. The play is humorous take on the social landscape of the 16th and 17th centuries, including the era's customs, beliefs, professions, and trades, that updates the original story by displaying it in the looks and forms of the 21st century.

The play debuted at the Teatro Nuevo Apolo with music and original lyrics created by José Luis Narom. Narom collaborated with his wife, lyricist and costume designer Inma González (image designer and production manager on "The Blackout"). Narom created the play's music in the style of Broadway musicals, with full orchestrations.

The musical was included in the book Don Quixote literary theoretical thinking, as well as in the Guide to Musical Theater in Spain (1955–2012). edited by Xavier Martínez and Íñigo Santamaría.

== 2005 production ==
The starring roles included:

- Dulcinea, played by the singer and actress Geno Machado
- Galeote, played by actor and singer Gonzalo Alcaín
- Rocinante, played by Esteban Oliver, who later played Zazu in The Lion King on Broadway and reprised the role in Madrid between 2011 and 2014.

The premiere was attended by entertainers such as Chenoa, Nuria Fergó, and Natalia.

Sancho Panza the Musical received awards in the category of Best Music in a Spanish Musical, for José Luis Narom in the X Review Awards Musical Theatre in Spain.

== Cast album ==
The producer recorded a live album of the musical with the original cast.

=== Musical numbers ===
Act One

- "Intro" – Musical introduction
- "La suerte ha cambiado"– Introduction to all the characters
- "Los Molinos" – The women sing, and Sancho Panza, Don Quixote attack windmills
- "Sabio Frestón" – The ghost of Don Quixote flies across the stage and torments him
- "Dulcinea y Quijote" – Don Quixote imagines that he and Dulcinea declare their love for each other.
- "Los Galeotes" – Don Quixote and Sancho Panza free the galley slaves.
- "Alabanzas" – The choir, Don Quixote, and Sancho Panza sing the praises of Don Quixote
- End of first Act

Act Two

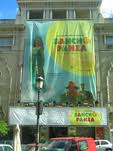
New Apolo Theatre – Madrid

- Intermission
- "Rocinante y Mula" – Don Quijote's horse and Sancho's mule sing and dance while their masters sleep
- "Sancho y Teresa" – Sancho misses his wife Teresa and sings with his mule sing; the most romantic ballad in the musical
- "Dulcinea y Sancho" – Dulcinea appears in dreams to console Don Quixote after his defeat by the Knight of the White Moon
- "Teresa, the Housekeeper and Niece" – Don Quijote's housekeeper and niece, along with Teresa, miss the men
- "Dame tu amor" – Don Quixote is sick and everyone says goodbye, singing and dancing in his honor; the final musical number
- "Final"

== Cast and crew ==
=== Madrid original cast ===
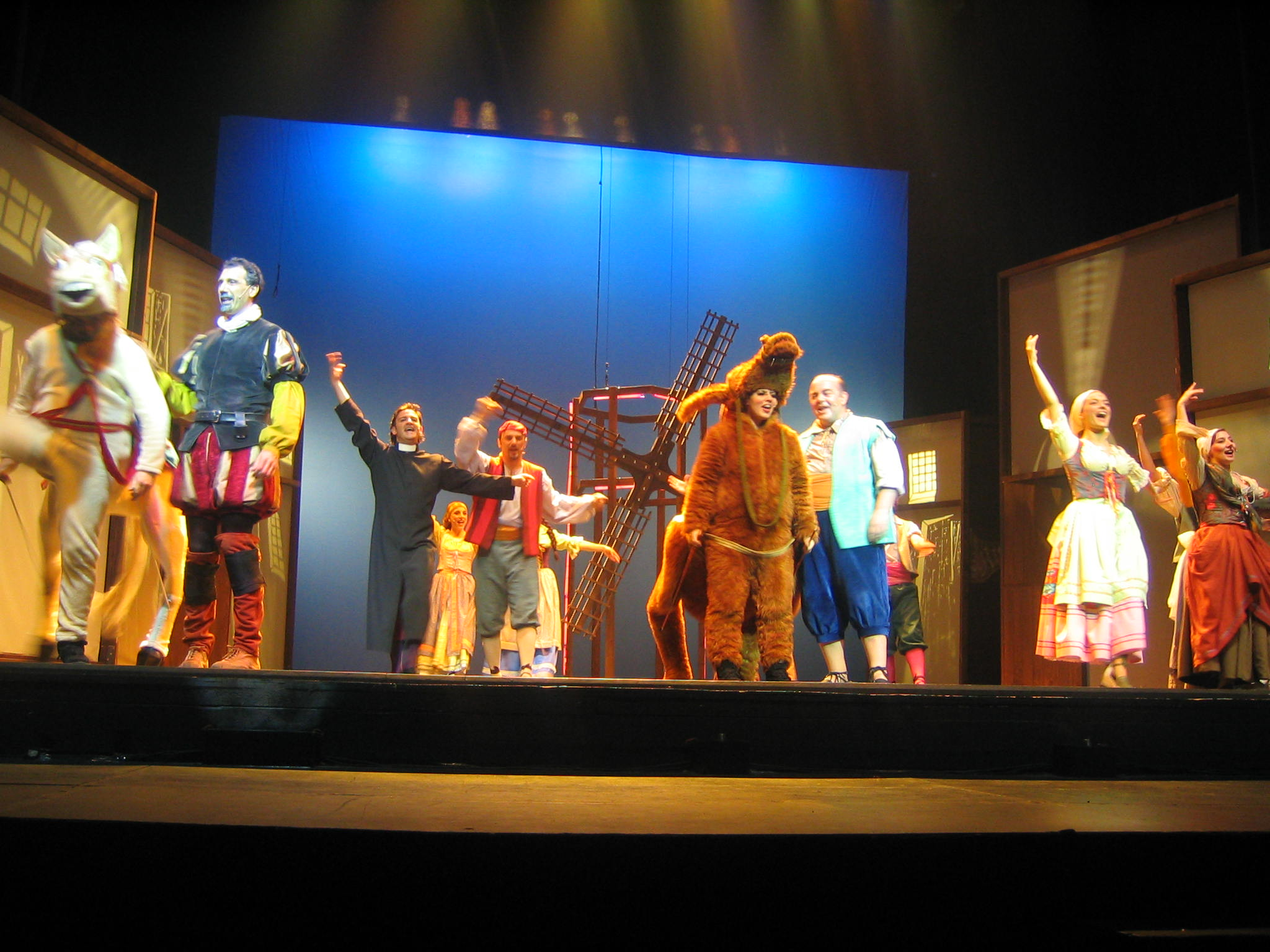
Original Cast – Madrid

- Geno Machado (Dulcinea)
- Angel Savín (Sancho Panza)
- Luz Martinez (Rucio/Dapple)
- Manuel Elias (Don Quixote)
- Esteban Oliver (Rocinante)
- Azucena Ribas (Teresa)
- Lourdes Zamalloa (Ama/Housekeeper)
- Eva Manjon (Sobrina/Niece)
- Carlos Segui (Cura/Priest)
- Pedro Ordóñez (Duque/Duke)
- Marta Arroyo (Duquesa/Duchess)
- Marcos Valiente (Mayordomo/Butler)
- José Manuel Santos (Sabio Frestón/Frestón Wise)
- Quique Fernández (Caballero de la Blanca Luna/Knight of the White Moon)
- Gonzalo Alcaín (Galeote/Galley Slave)
- Nuria Zamora (Aldeana/Villager)

=== Crew ===
- Original music and arrangements: José Luis Narom
- Vocal direction: Eduardo Laguillo
- Director of choreography: Alberto Sánchez Diezma
- Script and song lyrics: Inma González and José Luis Narom
- Set design: J. Carlos Guerra
- Lighting design: Lola Barroso
- Costume design: Inma González
- Stage direction: José Luis Narom

== Press ==
- "La mirada de Sancho" (Sancho's point of view) in El Mundo
- "Pleitesía al Quijote" (An homage to Quijote) in El Mundo
- "De 'triunfito a Dulcinea" (On Dulcinea's triumph) in El Mundo
- "Ionesco y Cervantes, en otra dimensión" (Ionesco and Cervantes, in another dimension) in El País
- "Fantasías y locuras del fiel escudero" (Fantasies and madness of the faithful squire) in 20 minutos
- Guía Ilustrada del Teatro Musical en España (Illustrated guide to musical theater in Spain) in Arte & Ocio
- Sancho Panza - Recortes de Prensa - Vídeos (Press clippings and videos for Sancho Panza) in Arte & Ocio
- "El musical Sancho Panza s'acomiada avui del Teatre Nou Apolo de Madrid" (The musical Sancho Panza bids farewell today to the Nuevo Apolo Theatre in Madrid) in VilaWeb
