= Why Five =

Spanish music group

- Origin: Spain
- Genres: Pop; Dance
- Years active: 2013-2015
- Label: MUWOM
- Past members: Fabio Arrante; Christian Villanueva; Mark Lysander; Jorge Ansotegui; Alberto L. G.

Why Five (occasionally stylized Y5) is a Spanish boy band formed in 2013 which sings in both English and Spanish.

== Career ==
=== Formation (2013) ===
In June 2013, during an episode of Spanish talk show El Hormiguero, host Pablo Motos confirmed they were working with producer and musician Carlos Jean (also a frequent collaborator on the show) to create a Spanish boy band ("we want to make the Spanish One Direction, the Spanish Backstreet Boys", as stated by Motos, words that stirred some controversy amongst the fans of an already established Spanish boy band, Auryn).

During the summer, Jean and part of the crew of El Hormiguero held castings in different points of Spain to scout for potential band members. By the time the next season of the show started in September, the castings were finished and the finalists appeared on El Hormiguero for live auditions. On each of these auditions, a band member was selected with the votes of several of the show's collaborators and guests. The audience also voted via Twitter. The band was completed on October 29, 2013, when Alberto Ladrón de Guevara was selected as the fifth member.

The name of the band was also selected via Twitter, and it was announced live on the November 11, 2013 episode of El Hormiguero by the night's special guests Backstreet Boys, just moments before Why Five's first live performance, in which they debuted their first single, Going Up. The other possible names were Five For One, Shh and Forks (Rayden was also an option but it was quickly removed from the poll since a Spanish MC was already using it as his stage name).

=== Debut EP (2014) ===
On January 27, 2014, Why Five released their self-titled debut EP. It featured the two singles they had already published, Going Up and Get Down, plus new tracks Honey and Why.

In October 2014, Mark and Jorge announced they were leaving the band. Later that month, Alberto confirmed via Twitter that he had dropped out of the band too in order to pursue a solo career. The remaining two members quietly parted ways in 2015.

== Members ==
All members are vocalists.

- Fabio Arrante, from Madrid
- Christian Villanueva, from Barcelona
- Jorge Ansótegui, from Logroño
- Marc Herrera, from Barcelona
- Alberto L. G., from Barcelona
