= José Balaca =

Spanish painter (1800–1869)

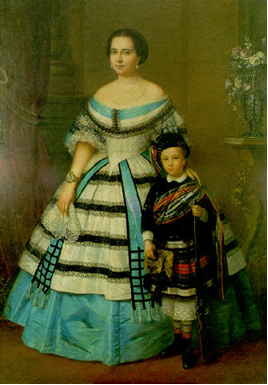
Retrato de dama con su hijo , c.1860.

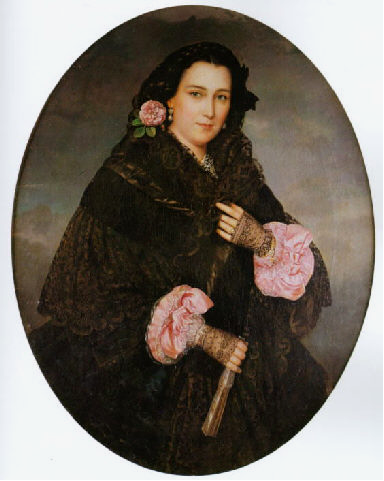
Dama con abanico, c. 1857.

José Balaca y Carrión (1800–1869) was a Spanish painter born in Cartagena. He was father of the painters Eduardo Balaca and Ricardo Balaca.

In 1828, Balaca moved to Madrid to attend the Real Academia de Bellas Artes de San Fernando. He later obtained royal patronage for his paintings of patriotic scenes from the First Carlist War. Following the overthrow of the Espartero regime, Balaca went into exile and established himself in Lisbon as a portrait painter and miniaturist, receiving commissions from the royal court.

Balaca traveled extensively, making lengthy stays in London and Paris, where he resided and worked for some time. He eventually returned to Spain and settled permanently in Madrid in 1852. He died there at the age of sixty-nine on November 19, 1869.
