= La Voz (Spanish TV series) season 2 =

La Voz
- Season 2
- Hosted by: Jesús Vázquez; Tania Llasera (Backstage)
- Judges: David Bisbal; Rosario Flores; Malú; Antonio Orozco

Release
- Original network: Telecinco
- Original release: 16 September – 19 December 2013

Season chronology
- ← Previous; Season 1

La Voz (season 2) is an ongoing Spanish reality talent show that premiered on 16 September 2013 on Telecinco. Based on the reality singing competition The Voice of Holland, the series was created by Dutch television producer John de Mol. It is part of an international series.

Melendi left the show, being replaced by Antonio Orozco. David Bisbal, Rosario Flores and Malú continued as coaches. Jesús Vázquez and Tania Llasera remained as the host and the social media correspondent respectively.

== Stage 1: "Audiciones a ciegas" (Blind Auditions) ==
The Blind Auditions were taped in July 2013 and aired from 16 September to 21 October 2013 in six telecasts. 95 auditioners took part in the Blind Auditions. Each coach had to form a team of 16 contestants.

Key	Coach hit his or her "QUIERO TU VOZ" button	Contestant eliminated with no coach pressing his or her "QUIERO TU VOZ" button	Contestant defaulted to this coach's team	Contestant elected to join this coach's team

=== Episode 1: 16 September 2013 ===
The first episode began with the four coaches singing a medley of "Qué bonito", "Vuelvo a verte", "Dígale" and "No hay más".

Order	Contestant	Song	Coaches' and Contestants' Choices			
Order	Contestant	Song	David Bisbal	Rosario Flores	Malú	Antonio Orozco
1	Ainhoa Aguilar	"And I Am Telling You I'm Not Going"	—	—		
2	Laura Pastor	"One Way or Another"	—	—	—	—
3	Darío Benítez	"Without You"				
4	Estíbaliz Martín	"Think of Me"		—		
5	Estela Amaya	"Válgame Dios"	—			—
6	Sarah Miró	"Nothing Else Matters"	—	—	—	—
7	Dina Arriaza	"Will You Love Me Tomorrow"				
8	Tina Riobo	"Somebody Else's Guy"				
9	Gabri Serrini	"If I Ain't Got You"	—			
10	Mayka Alonso	"Historia de un Amor"	—	—	—	—
11	Jaume Mas	"Toda una vida"	—	—	—	
12	David Barrul	"Al alba"				
13	Fran & Salva	"Aquí Estoy Yo"	—	—	—	—
14	Idoia Bediaga	"Cigarettes"	—		—	

=== Episode 2: 23 September 2013 ===
Order	Contestant	Song	Coaches' and Contestants' Choices			
Order	Contestant	Song	David Bisbal	Rosario Flores	Malú	Antonio Orozco
1	Yarelín García	"You Shook Me All Night Long"	—	—	—	—
2	Leyna Sadki	"What a Diff'rence a Day Made"				
3	Haley Haitz	"Mean"	—	—	—	
4	Marcos Galindo	"Mi vida privada"		—		—
5	Mila Balsera	"Como una ola"	—	—	—	—
6	María Ayo	"One Night Only"				
7	Damon Robinson	"Stuck on You"				
8	Yoio Cuesta	"Sunny"	—		—	—
9	Dariel Ventura	"One"	—	—	—	—
10	Mandy Santos	"When I Was Your Man"				
11	Virginia Moss	"Me cuesta tanto olvidarte"		—	—	—
12	Juan Miguel Castillero	"I Won't Give Up"	—	—	—	—
13	José Ramírez	"The Power of Love"	—		—	
14	Noemí Fernández	"Sueños Rotos"	—	—	—	—
15	Rocío Rivas	"Time to Say Goodbye"	—		—	
16	Sergio Rojas	"Glory Days"	—	—		—

=== Episode 3: 30 September 2013 ===
Order	Contestant	Song	Coaches' and Contestants' Choices			
Order	Contestant	Song	David Bisbal	Rosario Flores	Malú	Antonio Orozco
1	Amynata Sow	"Back to Black"				
2	Andrea Beltrán	"Morena mía"	—	—	—	
3	Álvaro Hernández	"Qué sabe nadie"	—	—	—	—
4	Trinidad Amador	"Verde que te quiero verde"	—			—
5	Mercedes Morales	"My Baby Just Cares for Me"	—	—	—	—
6	Cristina Rueda	"All Right Now"	—	—		
7	Jordi Galán	"Con te partirò"		—		
8	Cassandra De Rosa	"If I Were a Boy"	—	—		—
9	Roger Ballesté	"Nada cambiará mi amor por ti"	—	—	—	—
10	Susana Sheiman	"Think"				
11	Luciano Méndez	"Have You Ever Seen the Rain?"	—	—		—
12	Freya	"All by Myself"	—	—	—	—
13	Xino Gómez	"Volver"			—	—
14	María Amolategi	"You're Beautiful"	—		—	—
15	Verónica Cantos	"Strong Enough"	—	—	—	—
16	Bárbara Isasi	"We Found Love"	—			

=== Episode 4: 7 October 2013 ===
Order	Contestant	Song	Coaches' and Contestants' Choices			
Order	Contestant	Song	David Bisbal	Rosario Flores	Malú	Antonio Orozco
1	Janyssha Lyon	"Hot Stuff"	—	—		
2	Xandro Leima	"Cómo he de vivir sin tu cariño"	—	—	—	—
3	Elena Grau	"Eternal Flame"			—	
4	Sandra Rodrigo	"Crazy"	—		—	—
5	Juan Valverde	"Insurrección"	—	—	—	—
6	Silverio Belmonte	"S.O.S."	—	—		—
7	David Velardo	"Bohemian Rhapsody"				
8	Patricia Clark	"Night and Day"	—	—	—	—
9	Mª Carmen Muyor	"La gata bajo la lluvia"	—		—	—
10	Olga Romero	"Sevilla"	—	—	—	—
11	Nacho Lezcano	"Rolling in the Deep"	—	—	—	
12	Raúl Ventura	"Cartas amarillas"	—	—	—	—
13	Jorge Moreno	"Te he echado de menos"	—		—	—
14	Érika Gómez	"I Say a Little Prayer"	—			—
15	Jota Martín	"Pan y mantequilla"	—	—	—	—
16	Marta Oliva	"Girls Just Want to Have Fun"		—	—	—
17	Eduardo Ruiz	"Y ahora"	—		—	

=== Episode 5: 14 October 2013 ===
Order	Contestant	Song	Coaches' and Contestants' Choices			
Order	Contestant	Song	David Bisbal	Rosario Flores	Malú	Antonio Orozco
1	Raúl Pulido	"Lía"	—	—	—	—
2	Susana Ruiz	"Halo"		—		—
3	Inma Herrera	"90 minutos"	—			
4	Reme Baldoví	"Nada de nada"	—	—	—	—
5	Agustín Tirado	"Troublemaker"				
6	Ana Ortega Santos	"Can't Take My Eyes Off You"	—		—	—
7	Noelia "Nowi" García	"Contigo en la distancia"	—	—	—	
8	Alexandra Ventura	"Vuelvo a verte"	—	—	—	—
9	Álex Escribano	"Maniac"		—		—
10	Martín Bueno	"Save Tonight"	—	—		—
11	Diogo Augusto	"Broken Strings"	—	—	—	—
12	Cissy Miranda	"Nosotros"			—	—
13	Sandra Morales	"El hombre del piano"	—	—	—	
14	Carla Royo	"This Is the Life"	—	—	—	—
15	Lydia Lauren	"Bewitched, Bothered and Bewildered"	—	—		—
16	Iago Pico	"Set Fire to the Rain"	—	—	—	—
17	Gonzalo Alcaín	"The Way You Look Tonight"	—		—	—

=== Episode 6: 21 October 2013 ===
Order	Contestant	Song	Coaches' and Contestants' Choices			
Order	Contestant	Song	David Bisbal	Rosario Flores	Malú	Antonio Orozco
1	Rangel Da Silva	"Little Things"	—			
2	Fabio Canu	"Sweet Home Alabama"	—	—	—	—
3	Ivet Vidal	"Fallin'"	—		—	—
4	Alonso González	"Livin' on a Prayer"	—	—	—	—
5	Marta Pons	"¡Corre!"	—	—		—
6	Odette Suárez	"Somebody That I Used to Know"	—		—	—
7	Beatriz Lindo	"Unwritten"	—	—	—	—
8	Alejandro Udó	"No me lo creo"			—	
9	Paula Espinosa	"El fallo positivo"		—	—	—N/a
10	Nora Jiménez	"Mercy on Me"				—N/a
11	Brigitte Emaga	"No One"			—N/a	—N/a
12	Rosa de Lima	"Que te quería"	—	—N/a	—N/a	—N/a
13	Robert Matchez	"It's a Beautiful Day"		—N/a	—N/a	—N/a
14	Sandra Calderón	"Hoy"	—	—N/a	—N/a	—N/a
15	Alba Lucía	"María se bebe las calles"		—N/a	—N/a	—N/a

== Stage 2: "Las Batallas" (The Battles) ==
The battle rounds were broadcast from 28 October to 11 November. 'Steals' were introduced this season, where each coach could steal two contestants from another team when they lost their battle round. The advisers for the battles are: Juan Magán working with Antonio Orozco; Cali & El Dandee helping David Bisbal; Carlos Vives accompanying Malú; and Coti joining Rosario.

Color key

Artist won the Battle and advances to the Knockouts
Artist lost the Battle but was stolen by another coach and advances to the Knockouts
Artist lost the Battle and was eliminated

Episode	Coach	Order	Winner	Song	Loser	'Steal' result			
Episode	Coach	Order	Winner	Song	Loser	Antonio Orozco	David Bisbal	Malú	Rosario
Episode 7	David Bisbal	1	Álex Escribano	"Crazy"	David Velardo	✔	—N/a	—	—
Episode 7	Malú	2	Mandy Santos	"Mama Do (Uh Oh, Uh Oh)"	Cassandra de Rosa	—	—	—N/a	—
Episode 7	Antonio Orozco	3	Jaume Mas	"La tortura"	Andrea Beltrán	—N/a	—	—	—
Episode 7	Rosario	4	Estela Amaya	"Cuando nadie me ve"	Trinidad Amador	—	—	✔	—N/a
Episode 7	David Bisbal	5	Tina Riobo	"Me and Mr. Jones"	Robert Matchez	—	—N/a	—	—
Episode 7	Malú	6	Silverio Belmonte	"Se nos rompió el amor"	Marcus Galindo	—	—	—N/a	✔
Episode 7	David Bisbal	7	Jordi Galán	"Somewhere"	Estíbaliz Martín	—	—N/a	—	—
Episode 7	Malú	8	Luciano Méndez	"Just Give Me a Reason"	Marta Pons	—	—	—N/a	—
Episode 7	Rosario	9	Idoia Bediaga	"Eye in the Sky"	Odette Suárez	—	—	—	—N/a
Episode 7	Antonio Orozco	10	Noelia "Nowi" García	"Like a Prayer"	Nacho Lezcano	—N/a	—	—	—
Episode 7	Rosario	11	Sandra Rodrigo	"Chain of Fools"	Yoio Cuesta	—	—	—	—N/a

== Ratings ==
#	Episode	Original air date	Viewers	Share	Source
1	"Blind Auditions 1"	16 September 2013	3,438,000	23.3%	
2	"Blind Auditions 2"	23 September 2013	3,560,000	24.6%	
3	"Blind Auditions 3"	30 September 2013	3,816,000	25.2%	
4	"Blind Auditions 4"	7 October 2013	3,722,000	24.6%	
5	"Blind Auditions 5"	14 October 2013	3,764,000	24.5%	
6	"Blind Auditions 6"	21 October 2013	3,591,000	20.2%	
