= Eduardo Balaca =

Spanish painter (c.1840–1914)

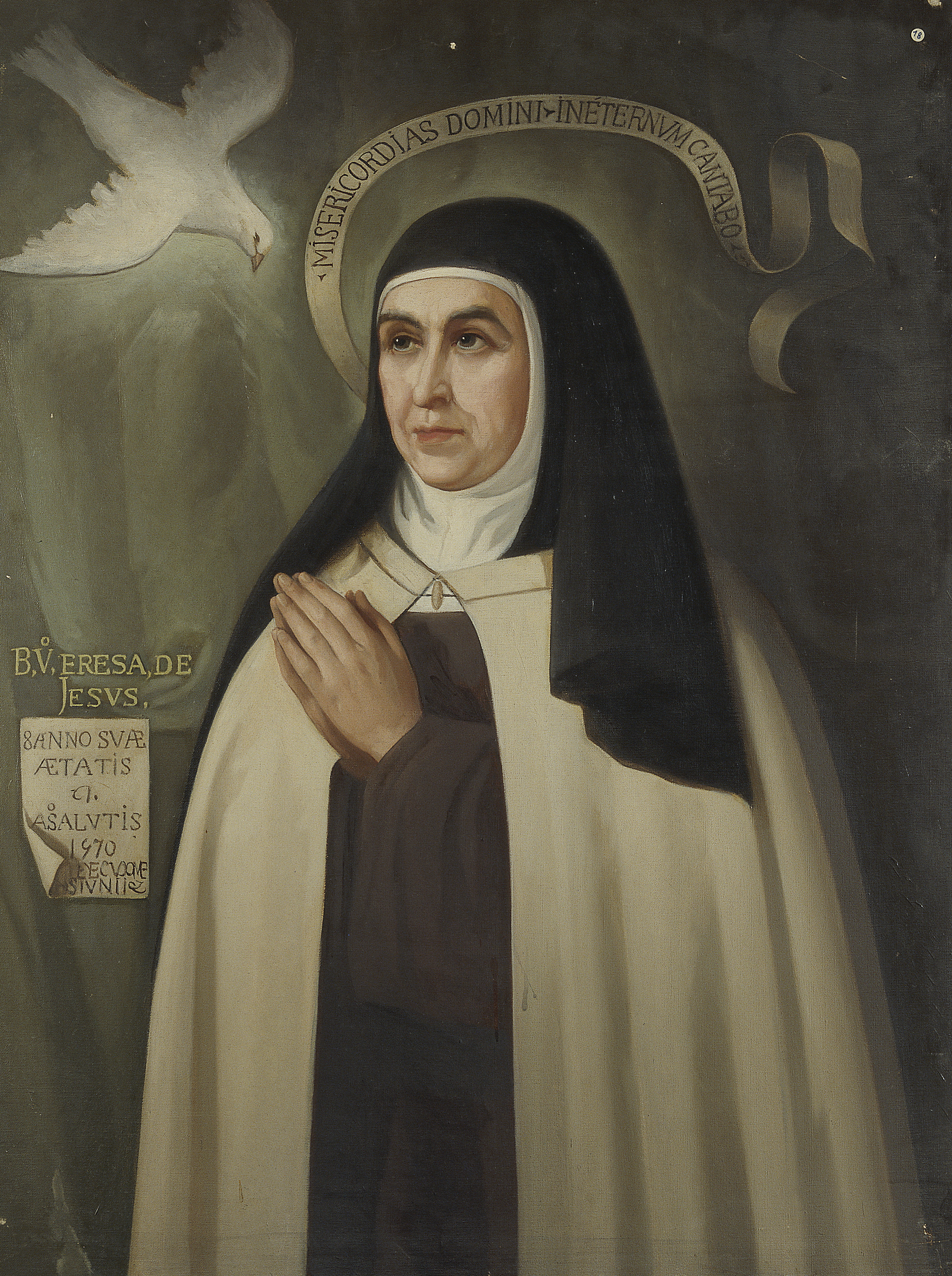
Portrait of Saint Teresa

Eduardo Balaca y Orejas-Canseco (c. 1840–1914) was a Spanish portrait painter, decorative artist, and art teacher. His brother was the battle painter, Ricardo Balaca.

== Biography ==
Balaca was born in Madrid. His father was the portrait painter and miniaturist, José Balaca. He grew up in Lisbon, where his father had gone into exile for political reasons. By 1852, the family had returned to Madrid. His first art lessons came from his father, then he attended the Real Academia de Bellas Artes de San Fernando, where he was later joined by his brother.

He exhibited frequently, earning honorable mention at the National Exhibition of Fine Arts in 1864 and 1867. Some of his best-known works include posthumous portraits of Miguel de Cervantes and Pedro Rodríguez, Count of Campomanes, as well as episodes from the life of Saint Teresa.

He created an "Allegory of Philosophy" for the Ateneo de Madrid and worked with his brother, creating figures of Saints Mark and Matthew for the Iglesia del Buen Suceso.

He was inactive for several years before his death, which occurred in Madrid.
