= Mandy Santos =

Spanish singer-songwriter

EYLA
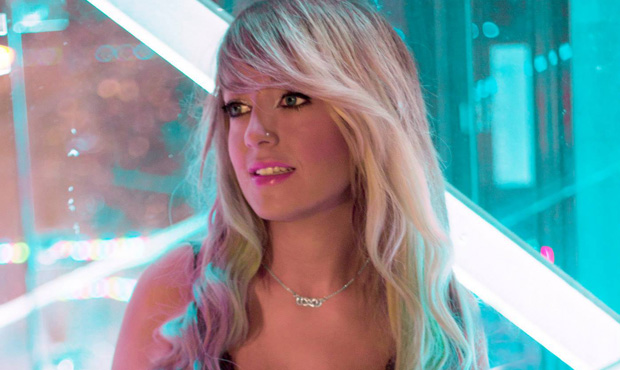

Background information
- Also known as: M-AND-Y, Mandy Santos, Mandy Díaz
- Born: Amanda Díaz; London, England
- Origin: Bilbao, Spain
- Genres: Pop, electronic, R&B, dance, indie
- Occupation: Singer
- Instrument: Vocals
- Years active: 2011–present
- Label: Sony/ATV Music Publishing

Mandy Santos (born Amanda Díaz in London, England) is a Spanish singer, songwriter, producer and topliner.

She was featured on the track "Gimme the Base" under the name of M-AND-Y, which was released in 2011 through Novaemusik (owned by Carlos Jean).

Mandy made a few collaborations in the electronic music scene like "Midnight", released in 2011 through Novaemusik and "Animal", released in September 2012 through Blanco y Negro Records. Nowadays she is working to Sony/ATV Music Publishing and recording her first album.

Under the name of Mandy Santos, she appeared in the second season of La Voz, the Spanish adaptation of the Dutch TV show. In the blind auditions she sang "When I Was Your Man" (Bruno Mars' song). She was chosen by the four coaches (Malú, Antonio Orozco, Rosario Flores and David Bisbal) and she chose Malú.

In 2016 she signed with a different label, and changed her name to Mandy Díaz.

She is working on her first album under the name of Eyla and writing for other artists.

== Featured singles ==
Year	Title	Chart positions
Year	Title	SPA
2011	"Gimme the Base"	1
2012	"Animal" (feat. Xuso Jones)	–
2013	"Aviator" (feat. Brian Cross)	–
