= José Luis Narom =

Spanish composer (born 1963)

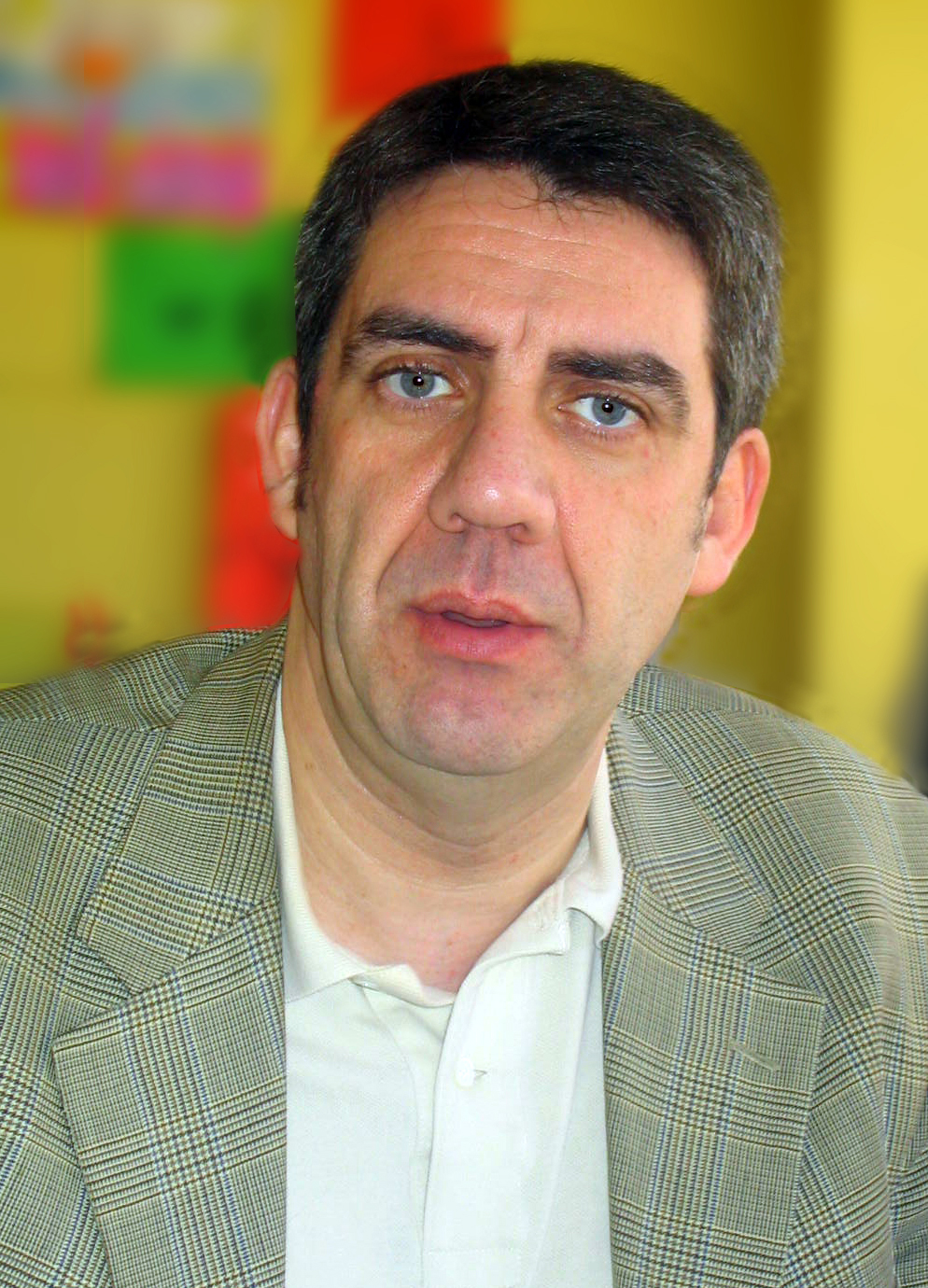
José Luis Narom in Madrid, 2005

José Luis Narom (a.k.a. José Luis Morán, born March 17, 1963, in Frankfurt, Germany) is a Spanish composer. He has written the music for several Spanish films by Eva Lesmes, Gabriel Beitia, David de la Torre, and Diego López Cotillo. He was awarded First Prize of Composition in 1997 for his work in Autonomous University of Madrid.

== Early life ==
José Luis Narom, also known as José Luis Morán was born in 1963 in Frankfurt - Germany. The birth name is José Luis G. Morán.

== Career ==
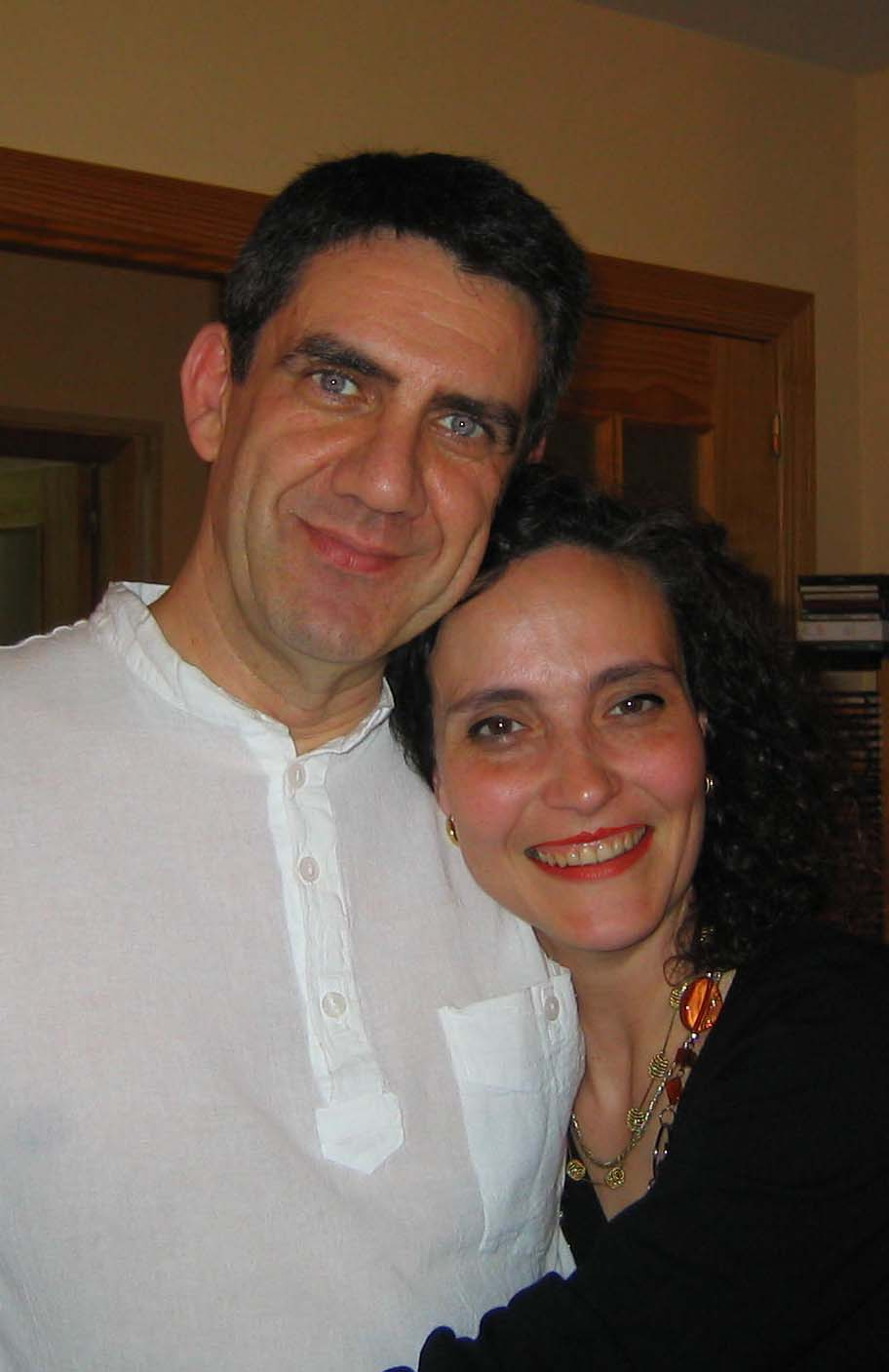
Narom and his wife, 2008

In 2002 Narom composed Eva Lesmes's music from film La Noche del Escorpión, starring Micky Molina (Miguel Molina).

In 2005 Narom composed original music and lyrics for The Musical Sancho Panza. Narom collaborated with his wife, lyricist and costume designer Inma González. The play's music was created in the style of Broadway musicals, with full orchestrations.

In 2009 Narom scored the music for Carta de Francia, by Diego López Cotillo. The film received international awards including those from International Film Festival KRAF (Croatia), Festival de Cinema de Girona (Spain), Festival Internacional Ojo al Sancocho (Colombia), Cortogenia (Spain).

In 2012 he composed the album Natura Heart. The musician presented and signed copies of his new album in Fnac, Madrid. March 8, 2013.

Narom has composed a number of scores from films directed by David de la Torre, including El Atasco (2017), El Anillo (2015), Escúchame (2014). He composed music for the Fabrizio Santana films Jóvenes sin Libertad (2017) and Una Visita Inquietante (2015). Narom also scored the music for 21 with 40, directed by Gabriel Beitia and Susan Béjar.

Narom is member of the European Composer and Songwriter Alliance (ECSA). In Spain he is a member of Musimagen (the association of audiovisual music composers)

== Personal life ==
His wife is Inma González, a lyricist and costume designer. His daughter is Laura Morán, an actress and singer.

== Awards and nominations ==
- Southern Shorts Awards Festival:
  - Best Original Soundtrack – Award of merit in music, 2017 for The Jam - Film (El Atasco)
- Autonomous University of Madrid
  - First place, composition prize, 1997
  - Finalist, composition prize, 1998
- MAX Performing Arts Awards
  - Nominated 2000–2005

== List of works ==
=== Filmography ===
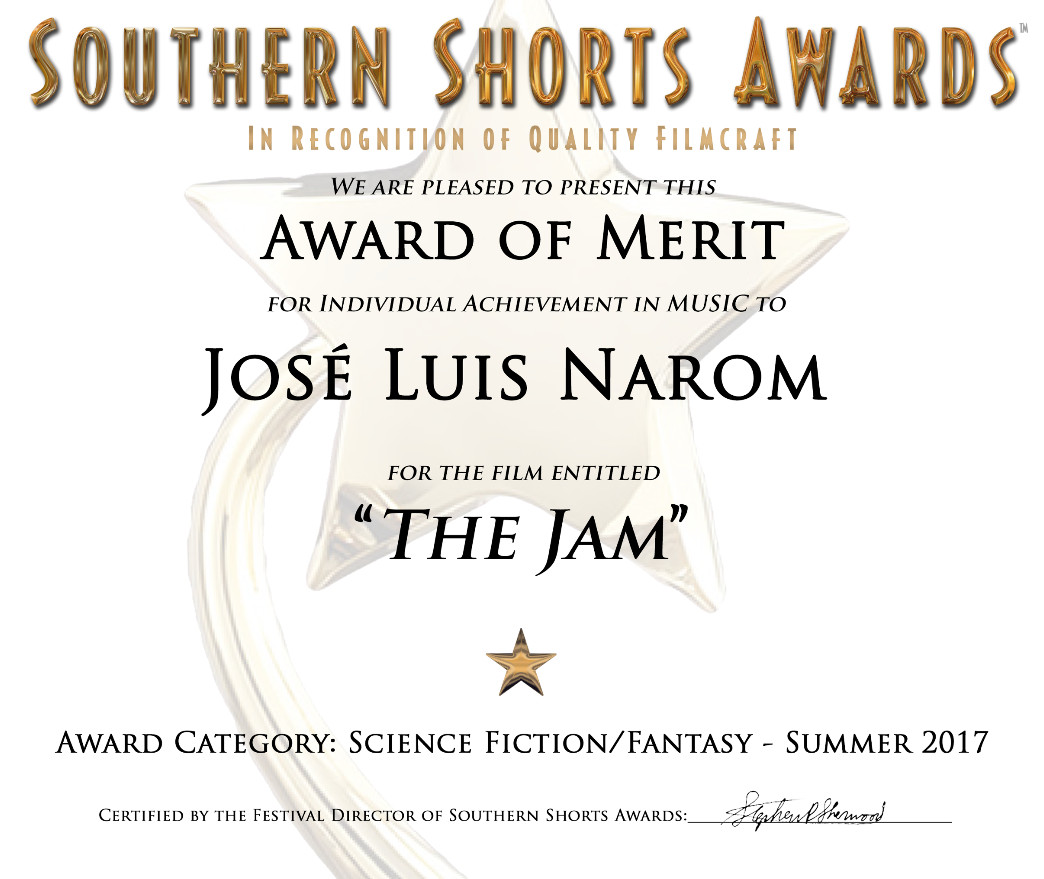
Narom at the Southern Shorts Awards Festival, 2017

Year	Film
2017	El Atasco
2017	Jóvenes sin Libertad
2015	El Anillo
2015	Una Visita Inquietante
2015	Princess Tales
2014	Escúchame
2014	Por los Pelos
2014	21 with 40
2014	La Laguna del Rey
2014	Segunda Oportunidad
2010	Memorias de Atracos
2009	Carta de Francia
2009	Lejos de los Mortales
2009	Una Visita Inquietante
2002	La Noche del Escorpión

=== Musicals ===
Year	Musical
2005	The Musical Sancho Panza
1998	Lysístrata

=== Musicals for children ===
Year	Musical
2017	El Príncipe Azul
2016	Lost on Letterland
2003	La Princesa Blancanube
2002	Blancanieves y los siete enanitos
2002	La Doncella y el Pirata
2001	La Bella Durmiente
2000	El Mago de Oz

=== Discography ===
Year	Album | Disk
2026	Jazz Olé (Jazz Album)
2025	El Anillo (BSO Film)
2025	Segunda Oportunidad (BSO Film)
2025	La Canción del Hada y Jacobo (La Bella Durmiente)
2024	Navidad en Familia (Christmas in Family)
2024	Bossa Heart Jazz
2024	Ethereal Piano – Music for Meditation
2024	Listen to me Film - BSO
2024	Marzos
2024	Bucle - Contemporary Dance
2024	El Mago de Oz
2024	Los Viernes de Onda Cero
2024	El Planeta de la Nina Coqueta
2024	Una Visita Inquietante Film - BSO
2024	28-12 Film - BSO
2024	Jovenes sin Libertad Film - BSO
2024	El Atasco Film - BSO
2024	21 con 40 Fim - BSO
2024	La Noche del Escorpion Film -BSO
2024	La Princesa de las Nieves
2024	La Princesa de las Estrellas
2024	La Princesa de los Mares
2024	Pinceladas - Mix
2022	Spanish Christmas Tales, Vol. 2
2022	Spanish Christmas Tales, Vol. 1
2012	Natura Heart
2005	The Musical Sancho Panza
2002	La Princesa Blancanube
1987	Early Morning Images – Classical Music
