= Ricardo Balaca =

Spanish painter and illustrator

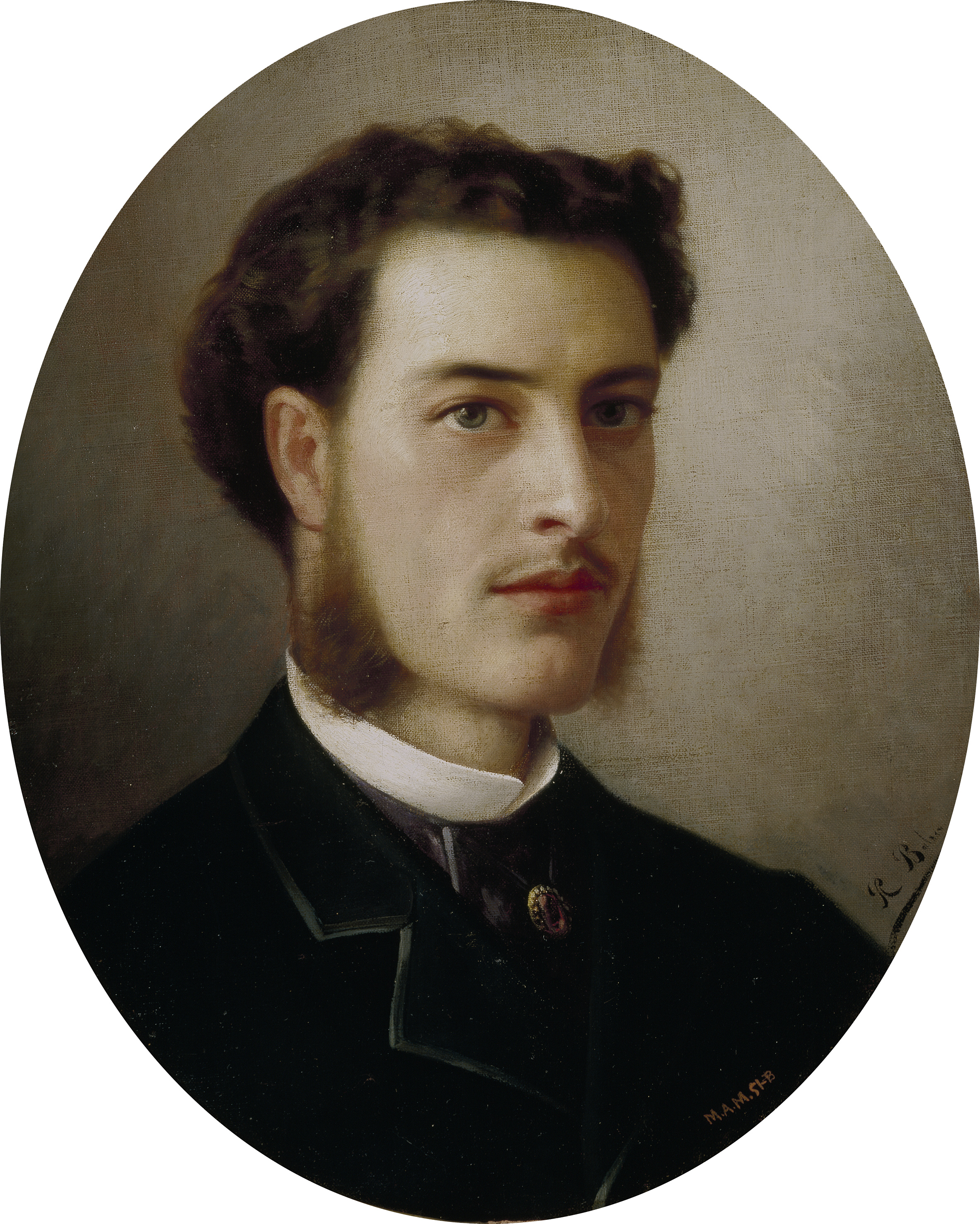
Self-portrait, c. 1863

Ricardo Balaca y Orejas-Canseco (31 December 1844 – 12 February 1880) was a Spanish painter and illustrator who specialized in battle scenes. His brother, Eduardo, was also a well-known painter.

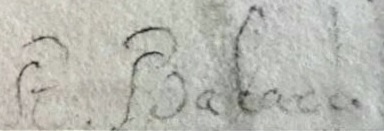
Signature in pencil on one of his watercolor drawings

== Biography ==
Balaca was born in Lisbon. His father was the painter, José Balaca, who was temporarily living there, having gone into exile for political reasons. He began his artistic training in the family workshop and finished at the Real Academia de Bellas Artes de San Fernando in Madrid, where he studied with Federico de Madrazo. His talents displayed themselves at an early age; he was only thirteen when he had his first showing at the National Exhibition of Fine Arts, receiving "honorable mention".

He created drawings, illustrations and numerous portraits, but is chiefly remembered for his portrayals of battles in Romantic style. During the Third Carlist War, he served as a correspondent on the northern front with the army of King Alfonso XII. His notable historic battle scenes include the Battle of Almansa, which was originally displayed in the Palacio de las Cortes, and the Battle of Bailén.

He also provided illustrations for a deluxe edition of the Miguel de Cervantes novel Don Quixote, annotated by Cervantes scholar Nicolás Díaz de Benjumea and published by Montaner y Simón after Balaca's death. It appears, however, that not all of the nearly three hundred illustrations are by Balaca, although no one else was officially credited in the first edition. In a reprint, issued in 1970, Josep Lluís Pellicer also receives credit.

He died in Madrid, aged 35. None of the available sources give a cause for his early death.

== Selected drawings and paintings ==
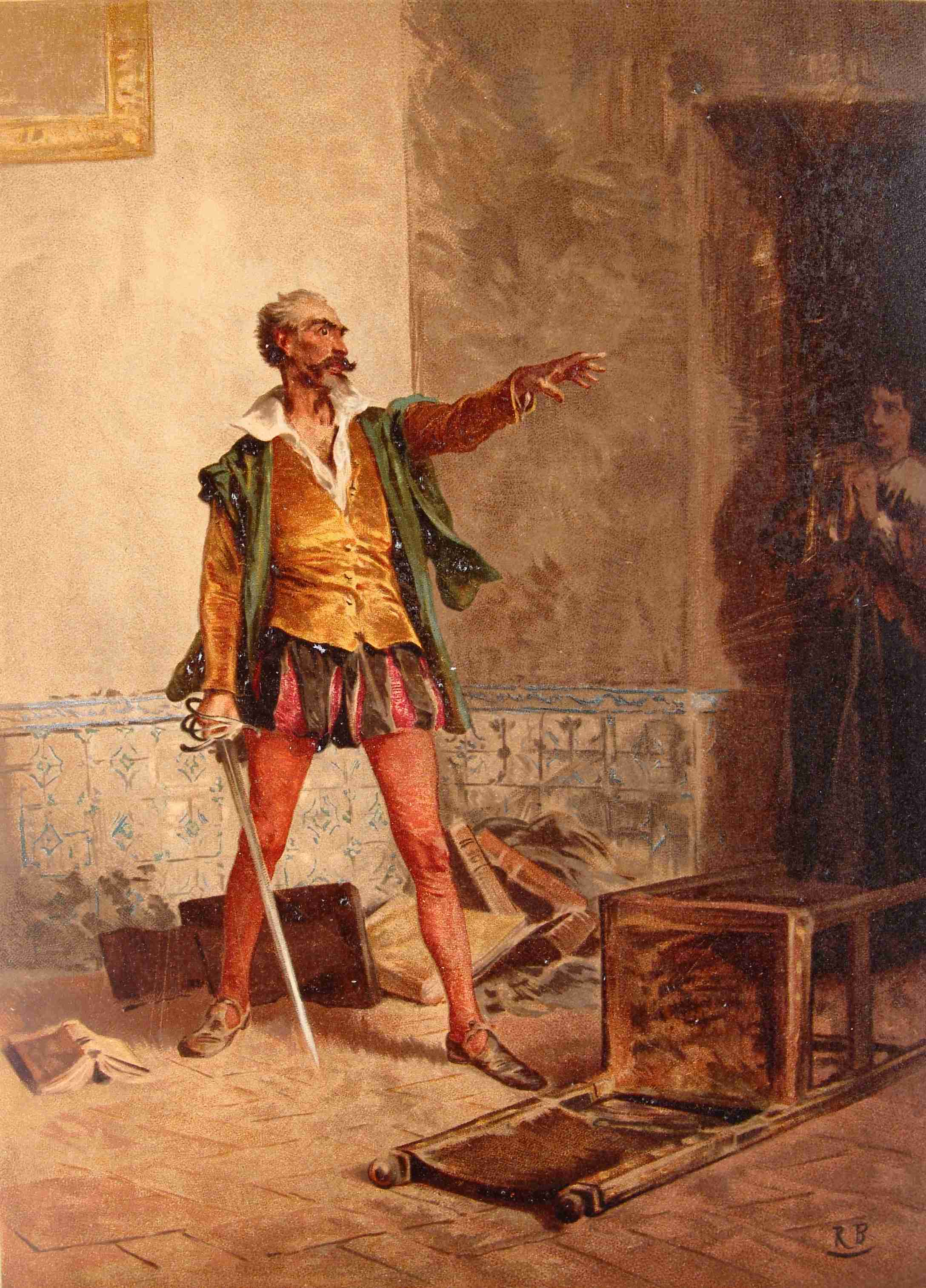
Illustration from Don Quixote

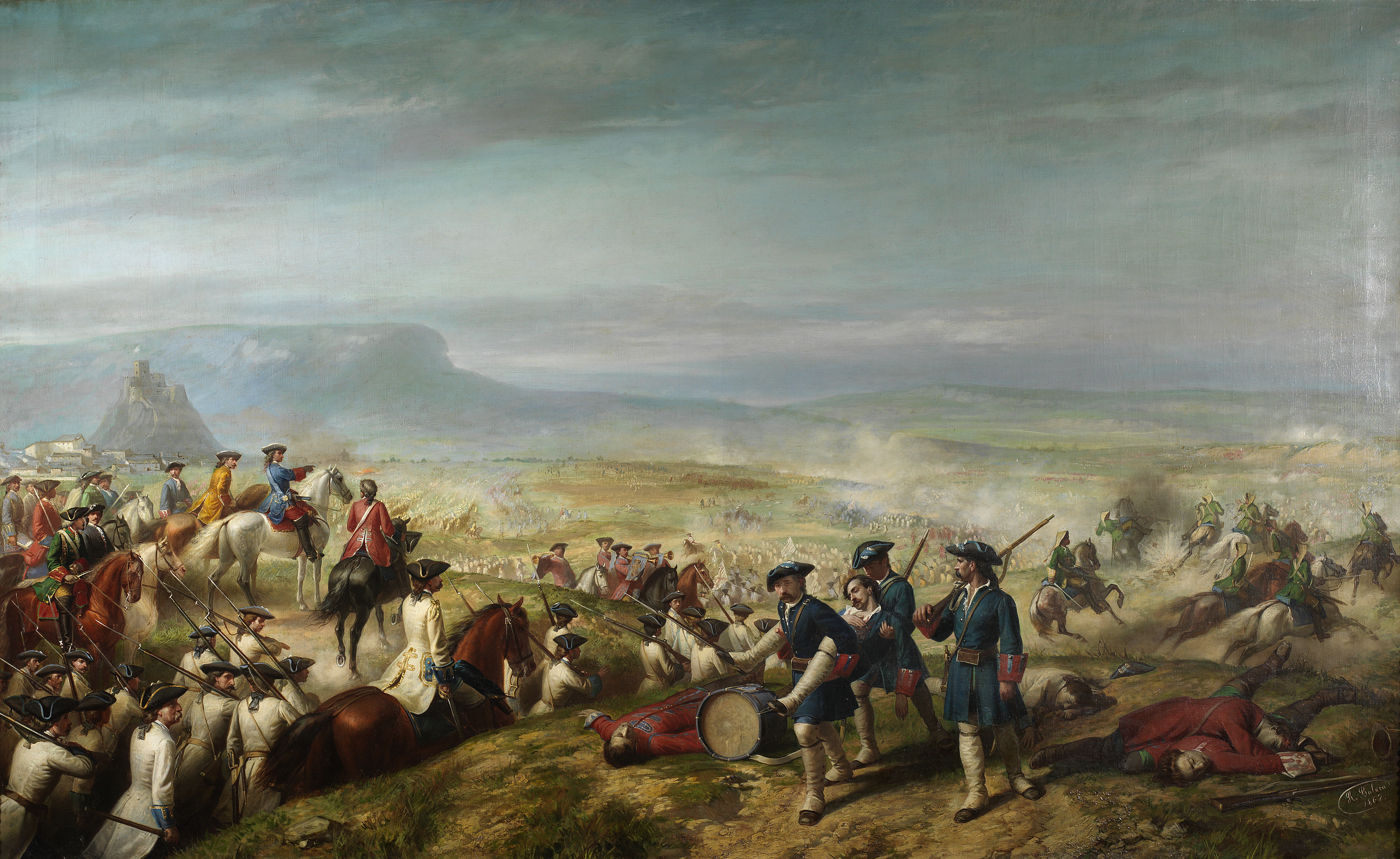
The Battle of Almansa

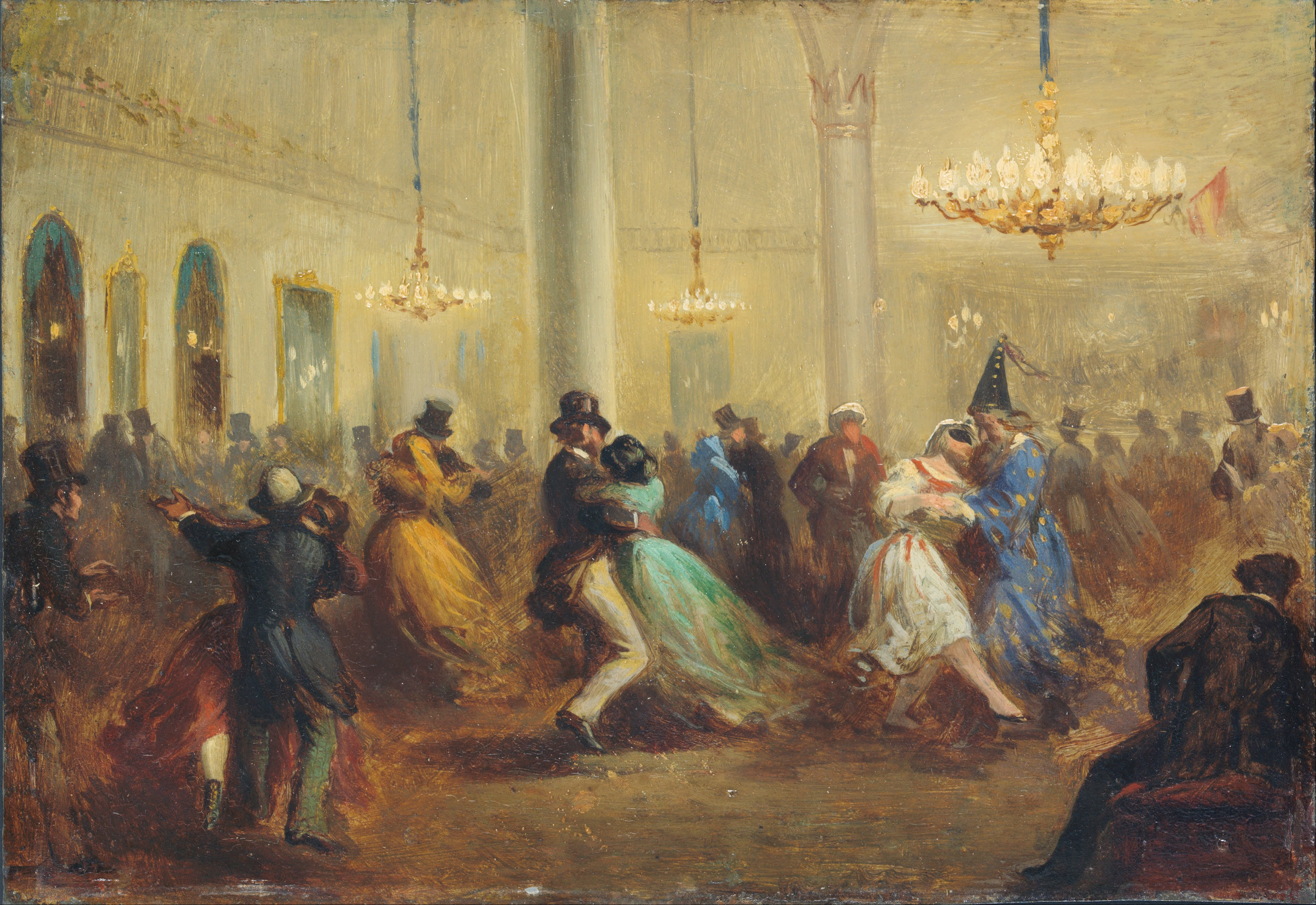
Dancing Chaplains

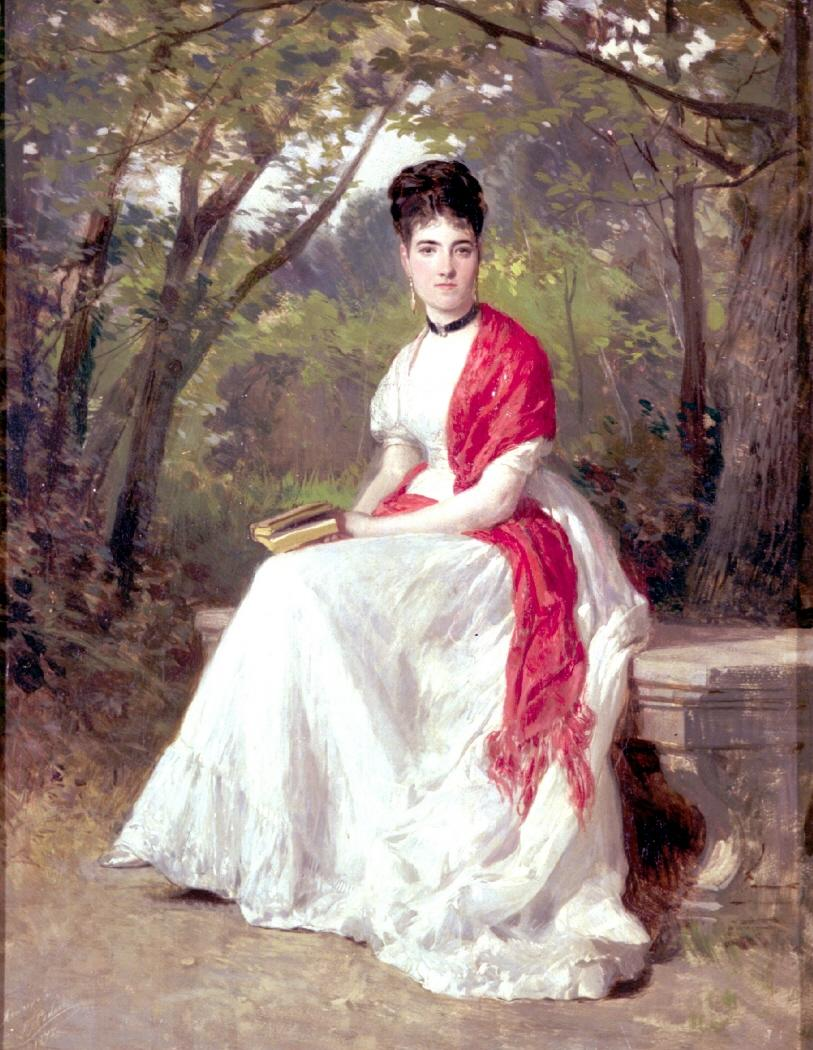
Portrait of his wife, Teresa Vergara
