= Carlos Jean =

Spanish DJ and record producer (born 1973)

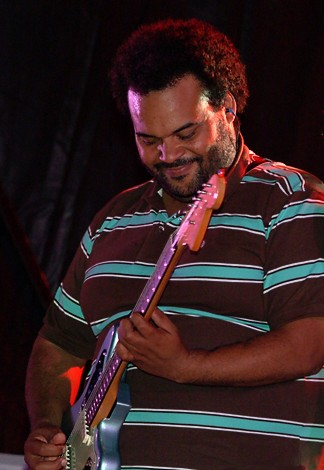
- Jean (left) and long-time collaborator Najwa Nimri in a concert

Background information
- Also known as: Mr. Miracle
- Born: Carlos Jean Arriaga; 15 June 1973 (age 52); Ferrol, Galicia, Spain
- Genres: Electronica, indie pop
- Occupations: DJ, record producer
- Years active: 1998–present
- Labels: Subterfuge, EMI Music Spain
- Website: www.carlosjean.com

Carlos Jean Arriaga (born 15 February 1973) is a Spanish DJ and record producer born in the region of Galicia in Northwestern Spain. He is the co-founder of the group Najwajean, and has been a producer for some of the most important Spanish and Latin-American artists of the 2000s, earning seven Latin Grammy nominations.

== Biography ==
=== 1973–1998: Early life ===
He was born on February 15, 1973, in Ferrol, an industrial city in the northwest of Spain, in the province of A Coruña. His parents are Jean Robert Jean, Haitian, and Julia Arriaga, a Spaniard from Galicia.

=== 1998–2010: Najwajean and solo projects ===
In 1998, he joined Spanish actress/singer Najwa Nimri to form the indie pop band Najwajean, releasing their first album, entitled No Blood, that same year. It was followed by original soundtracks for the films Asfalto and Guerreros, both directed by Daniel Calparsoso. Meanwhile, he launched a career as a solo artist, releasing his debut album, Planet Jean, in 2000. Two years later, he released Back to the Earth, which included the internationally acclaimed single "Mr. Dabada", and also a compilation album as part of Najwajean, Selection. He continued working alternatively as a solo singer and in Najwajean, with the releases of Mr. Miracle (2006) and Till It Breaks (2008), respectively.

"Mr. Dabada" was featured in a TV commercial for Intel Core 2 Duo microprocessor, which was aired in most American and European countries.

Since 2000, Jean has also become one of the best-known music producers in Spain, having worked with a variety of pop artists, including Alejandro Sanz, Miguel Bosé, Hombres G and Estopa.

Following the 2010 Haiti earthquake, Jean released the charity single Ay Haití, in which he gathered together some of the most important Spanish and South American artists of the moment to raise money for the earthquake victims. 25 artists collaborated in the song, including La Oreja de Van Gogh, Shakira, Miguel Bosé, Juanes, José Mercé and Alejandro Sanz. Jean's father, Jean Robert Jean, who was born in Haiti, had a part too in the song. Other personalities also appeared in the music video, such as Real Madrid football player Kaká, Barcelona's Andrés Iniesta, Atlético's Sergio Agüero, and actress Paz Vega. The song reached number one on the Spanish singles chart, and stayed on top for two weeks.

=== 2011–present: Plan B and Introducing Carlos Jean ===
In 2011, he started the initiative Plan B as an alternative way of music production by intercollaboration between musicians. It consisted of Jean uploading a music base to the Internet so that anyone could edit it and send it back with some addition, which could range from lyrics to background noise. It was sponsored by Ballantine's, and counted with collaborations from both famous and anonymous artists.

Following the success of such a revolutionary idea, his career was given a boost, with the compilation album Introducing Carlos Jean being released in May 2011. It contained some of the songs from the Plan B as well as hits from his previous three albums. It produced 2 top five singles, "Lead the Way" and "Gimme the Base (DJ)".

He also started appearing on a regular basis in the TV programme El Hormiguero, in which new Plan B tracks were created, presented or remixed live. Some achieved tremendous popularity, reaching number one in the Spanish iTunes Store. The Hormiguero remix of single "Lead the Way" peaked at number 9 on the Spanish singles chart. During his time on the show he held live castings that resulted in the formation of boy band Why Five and girl band Check Baby Check; however, both acts were short-lived.

== Discography ==
=== Albums ===
==== Studio albums ====
- 2000: Planet Jean
- 2002: Back to the Earth
- 2006: Mr. Miracle (SPA #67)

==== Compilation albums ====
- 2011: Introducing Carlos Jean (SPA #7)

==== As part of Najwajean ====
- 1998: No Blood (SPA #80)
- 2001: Asfalto OST (SPA #175)
- 2002: Guerreros OST (SPA #88)
- 2002: Selection (SPA #108)
- 2008: Till It Breaks (SPA #16)

=== Singles ===
- 2000: "Give Me the 70's"
- 2002: "Mr. Dabada"
- 2006: "Have a Nice Day"
- 2011: "Lead the Way" feat. Electric Nana (SPA #4)
- 2011: "Lead the Way (El Hormiguero remix)" feat. Electric Nana (SPA #9)
- 2011: "Gimme the Base (DJ)" feat. Mandy Santos (SPA #4)
- 2011: "Keep the Trance" feat. Mandy Santos (SPA #12)
- 2012: "Blackstar" feat. Ferrara (SPA #7)
- 2013: "Forza" Santander's Tribute to Scuderia Ferrari
