= Teatro Nuevo Apolo =

Theatre and cinema in Madrid, Spain

Coordinates: 40°24′44″N 3°42′12″W

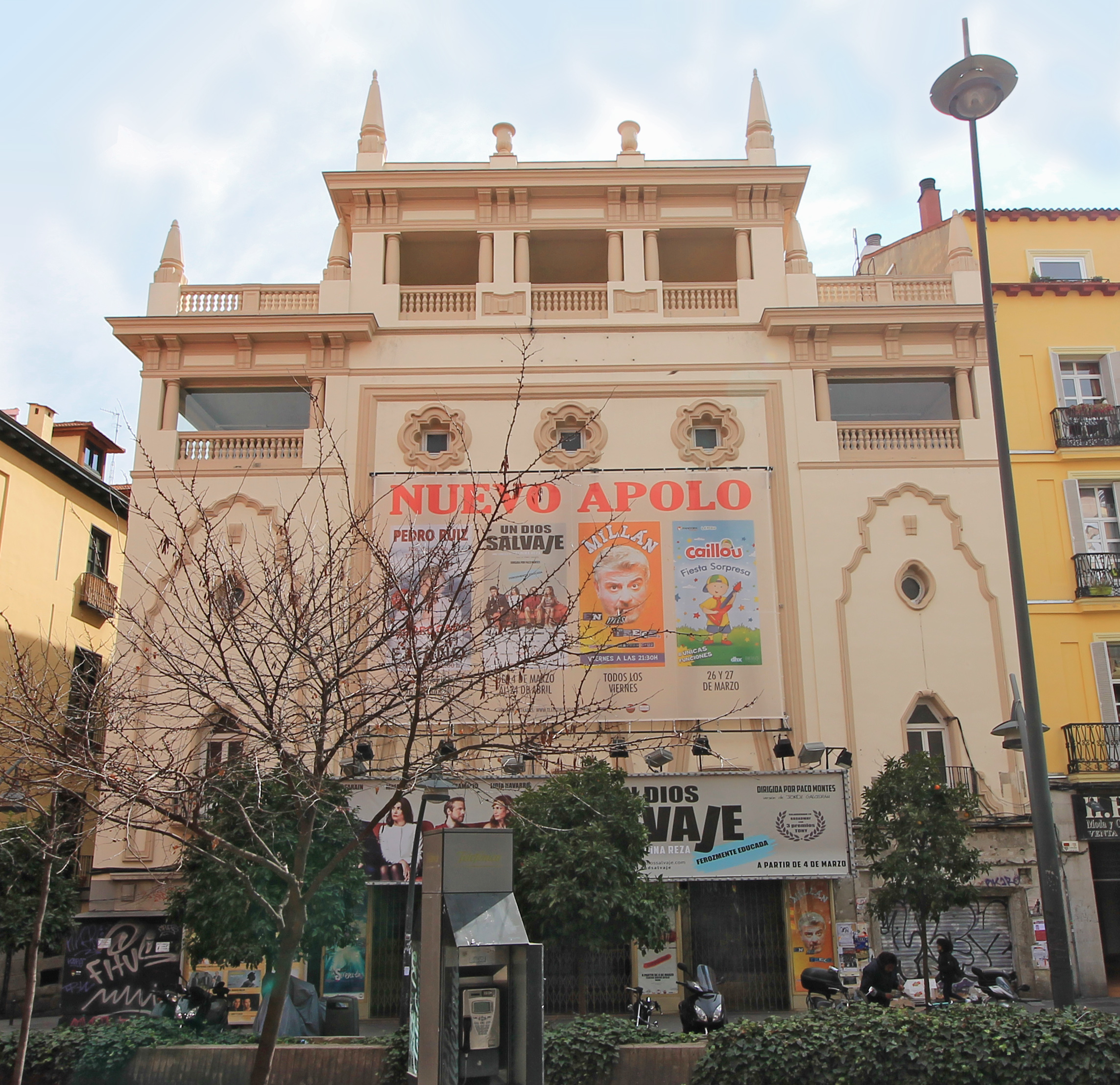
Teatro Nuevo Apolo on the Plaza de Tirso de Molina

Teatro Nuevo Apolo ("New Apolo Theatre"; al, Teatro Progreso and Cine Progreso) is an entertainment venue in Madrid, Spain. It is located in the Plaza de Tirso de Molina. The owners of the Teatro Apolo that existed on calle de Alcalá until its closure in 1929 decided to build a new venue, initially named Teatro Progreso, in the Plaza del Progreso (now Plaza de Tirso de Molina). The theatre opened on December 10, 1932 with the zarzuela, La verbena de la Paloma. It was converted to a film venue, the Cine Progreso, before its rededication to theatrical exhibitions and music entertainment of various genres, as well as dance and comedy.
