= La Voz (Spanish TV series) =

- Genre: Reality television
- Created by: John de Mol; Roel van Velzen
- Presented by: Jesús Vázquez; Tania Llasera; Eva González; Juanra Bonet
- Judges: David Bisbal; Rosario Flores; Malú; Melendi; Antonio Orozco; Alejandro Sanz; Laura Pausini; Manuel Carrasco; Juanes; Pablo López; Luis Fonsi; Paulina Rubio; Pablo Alborán; Mika; Sebastián Yatra; Lola Índigo
- Country of origin: Spain
- Original language: Spanish
- No. of seasons: 13
- No. of episodes: 145

Production
- Production locations: Atresmedia Studios; Madrid, Spain (2019–)
- Running time: 90-180 minutes
- Production companies: Talpa (2012–2019); Boomerang TV; Atresmedia (2019–); ITV Studios (2020–)

Original release
- Network: Telecinco (2012-2018) Antena 3 (2019-)
- Release: 19 September 2012 – present

Related
- The Voice (franchise); La Voz Kids; La Voz Senior

La Voz (Spanish for The Voice) is a Spanish reality talent show broadcast on Antena 3. It premiered on 19 September 2012 and is part of the international syndication The Voice based on the original Dutch television program The Voice of Holland, created by Dutch television producer John de Mol.

Twelve completed seasons have aired since the show's inception in 2012, with the thirteenth season currently airing in 2026. Telecinco originally aired the series through to season 5 with Antena 3 continuing the broadcasting from season 6.

The original panel of coaches consisted of David Bisbal, Rosario Flores, Malú, and Melendi. The coaching panel for the current thirteenth season features Melendi, Pablo López, Mika, and Lola Índigo. Other coaches from previous seasons were Antonio Orozco, Alejandro Sanz, Laura Pausini, Manuel Carrasco, Juanes, Luis Fonsi, Paulina Rubio, Pablo Alborán and Sebastián Yatra.

== Overview ==
=== Format ===
The show consists of three phases: a blind audition, a battle phase, and live performance shows. Four judges also known as coaches, all noteworthy recording artists, choose teams of contestants through a blind audition process. Each judge has the length of the auditioner's performance (about one minute) to decide if he or she wants that performer on his or her team; if two or more judges want the same performer (as happens frequently), the performer has the final choice of which coach's team to join.

After the coaches fill each respective slots in their team the batch of singers in the team is mentored and developed by its respective coach. In the second stage, called the battle phase, coaches have two of their team members battle against each other directly by singing the same song together on a stage that looks like a battle ring, with the coach choosing which team member to advance from each of individual "battles" into the first live round.

Within that first live round, the surviving four acts from each team again compete head-to-head, with public votes determining one of two acts from each team that will advance to the final eight, while the coach chooses which of the remaining three acts comprises the other performer remaining on the team.

In the final phase, the remaining contestants compete against each other in live broadcasts. The television audience and the coaches have equal say 50/50 in deciding who moves on to the final 4 phase. With one team member remaining for each coach, the (final 4) contestants compete against each other in the finale with the outcome decided solely by public vote.

=== Development, production and marketing ===
Mediaset Spain acquired the rights of the franchise back in 2011 after the success of the US counterpart. Initially it was expected to air on Cuatro, but in November 2011 Mediaset confirmed the show would premiere on the group’s main channel instead in spring 2012. Later, in February 2012 the air date was moved to fall 2012 and Jesús Vázquez, who had previous experience presenting talent shows like Popstars and Operación Triunfo, was confirmed as host. The names of the four coaches were confirmed by February 2012: David Bisbal, Malú, Rosario Flores and Melendi. Filming for the blind auditions stage of the competition began on 21 August 2012. On 29 August 2012 it was made known that Tania Llasera would serve as the social networking correspondent. The premiere, scheduled for 19 September 2012, was preceded two days before by a preview that aired simultaneously on all channels of the Mediaset Spain group.

Telecinco aired five seasons of La Voz between 2012 and 2017, as well as four seasons of La Voz Kids between 2014 and 2018. In June 2018, Atresmedia acquired the rights for the format and will produce new seasons of La Voz and La Voz Kids, as well as the first season of La Voz Senior.

== Coaches and hosts ==
The original coaches panel consisted of David Bisbal, Rosario Flores, Malú and Melendi with Jesús Vázquez and Tania Llasera as host and social media correspondent. Bisbal, Flores and Malú returned for season 2 with Antonio Orozco replacing Melendi. Alejandro Sanz and Laura Pausini replaced David Bisbal and Rosario Flores in the third season. In the fourth season Manuel Carrasco replaced Pausini and Orozco was replaced by original coach, Melendi. Sanz and Melendi were then replaced by Juanes and Pablo López in the fifth season.

In 2018, the series was acquired by Atresmedia. For the sixth season, Pablo López continued as coach, Antonio Orozco returned after a two-season hiatus, and Luis Fonsi and Paulina Rubio joined the panel. On 8 November 2019, it was announced that López and Orozco would remain on the panel for the seventh season and would be joined by returning coaches Pausini and Sanz who would replace Rubio and Fonsi who left the panel due to him coaching La Voz US. The seventh season featured a fifth coach Miriam Rodríguez, who choose no-chair turn auditioners to participate in The Comeback Stage.

After being season seven's winning coach, Pausini stated she would not return to the reality show. On 19 April 2021, it was officially confirmed that Sanz would be the only coach returning for season eight, while Pausini, Orozco and López would be replaced by returning coaches Malú, Fonsi and first-time coach Pablo Alborán respectively.

On 30 July 2022, it was officially confirmed that Fonsi, López, Orozco and Pausini would be returning for the ninth season, which was dubbed as the anniversary season to celebrate the show's 10-year history. During the season, the four original coaches - Bisbal, Flores, Malú and Melendi - also made appearances as advisors for each team during the Knockouts.

On 21 June 2023, it was confirmed that Fonsi, López and Orozco would all return for season ten, while Pausini would be replaced by Malú, who returned after a one-season hiatus. On 13 September 2023, it was announced that Rodríguez would also return as the Comeback Stage coach, after a one-season hiatus.

On 19 August 2024, it was announced that Fonsi, López, Malú and Orozco would all return for the eleventh season. This became the first time in the show's history that all four coaches return for a second-consecutive season. In May 2025, it was announced that López and Malú would return for the twelfth season, joined by former The Voice France coach Mika and former La Voz Kids coach, Sebastián Yatra.

On 10 June 2026, it was announced that López and Mika would return for the thirteenth season, while former coach Melendi would be returning after an eight-season hiatus. At the same time, it was announced that former La Voz Kids coach Lola Índigo would debut as a coach the panel. Former La Voz Kids coach Vanesa Martín debuted as a "second chance" coach this season, forming a parallel fifth team to the four main teams.

=== Coaches' timeline ===
Coach	Seasons												
Coach	1	2	3	4	5	6	7	8	9	10	11	12	13
David Bisbal													
Rosario Flores													
Malú													
Melendi													
Antonio Orozco													
Alejandro Sanz													
Laura Pausini													
Manuel Carrasco													
Juanes													
Pablo López													
Paulina Rubio													
Luis Fonsi													
Pablo Alborán													
Mika													
Sebastián Yatra													
Lola Índigo													
Miriam Rodríguez							C.S.			C.S.			
Vanesa Martín													C.S.

=== Line-up of coaches ===
Coaches' line-up by chairs order
Season	Year	Coaches			
Season	Year	1	2	3	4
1	2012	David	Rosario	Malú	Melendi
2	2013	David	Rosario	Malú	Antonio
3	2015	Alejandro	Laura	Malú	Antonio
4	2016	Alejandro	Manuel	Malú	Melendi
5	2017	Juanes	Manuel	Malú	Pablo
6	2019	Pablo	Paulina	Fonsi	Antonio
7	2020	Alejandro	Pablo	Laura	Antonio
8	2021	Alborán	Malú	Alejandro	Fonsi
9	2022	Fonsi	Pablo	Laura	Antonio
10	2023	Fonsi	Pablo	Malú	Antonio
11	2024	Fonsi	Pablo	Malú	Antonio
12	2025	Mika	Pablo	Malú	Yatra
13	2026	Mika	Pablo	Lola	Melendi

Current coaches

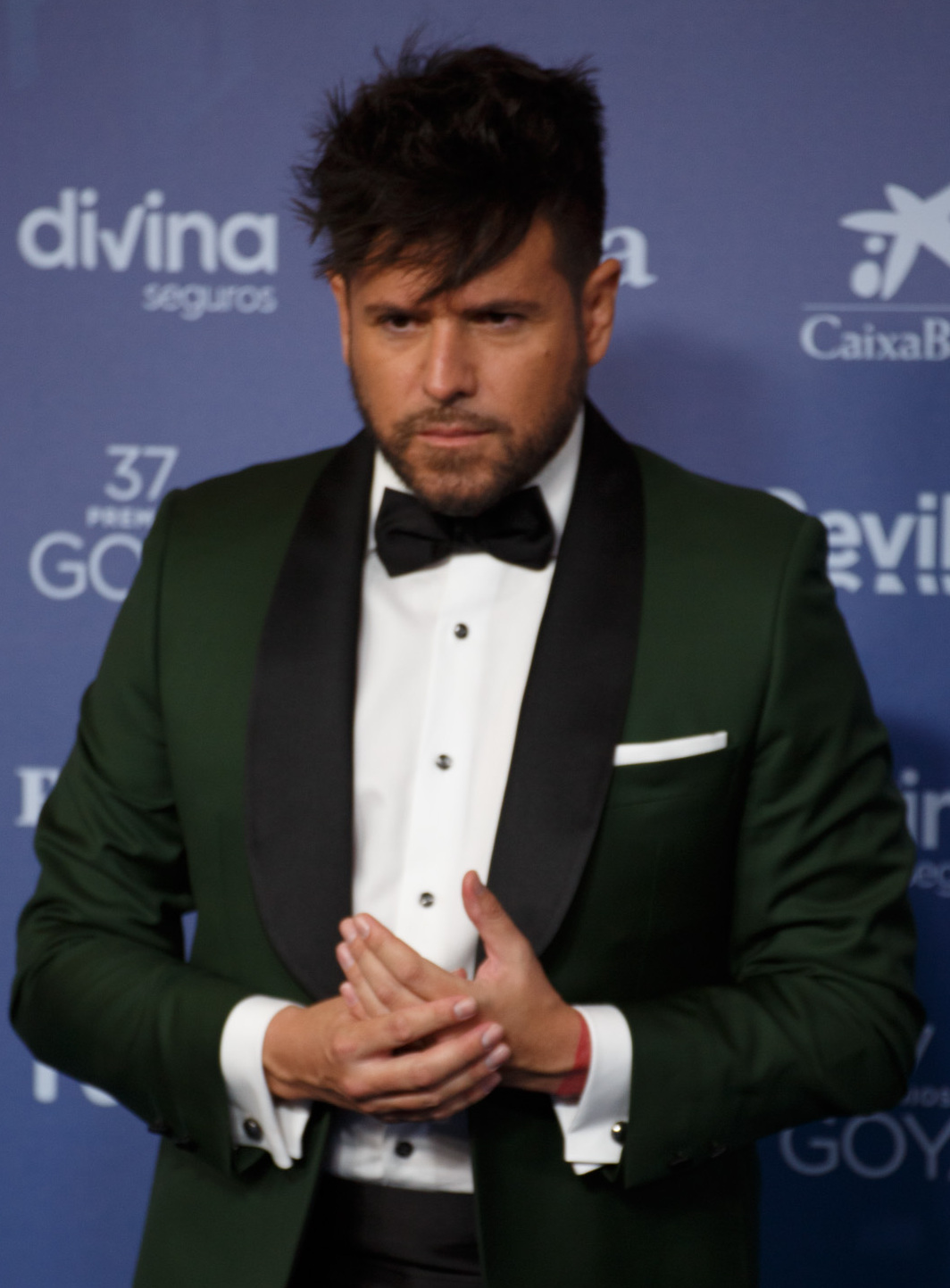
Pablo López (2017–2020, 2022–)

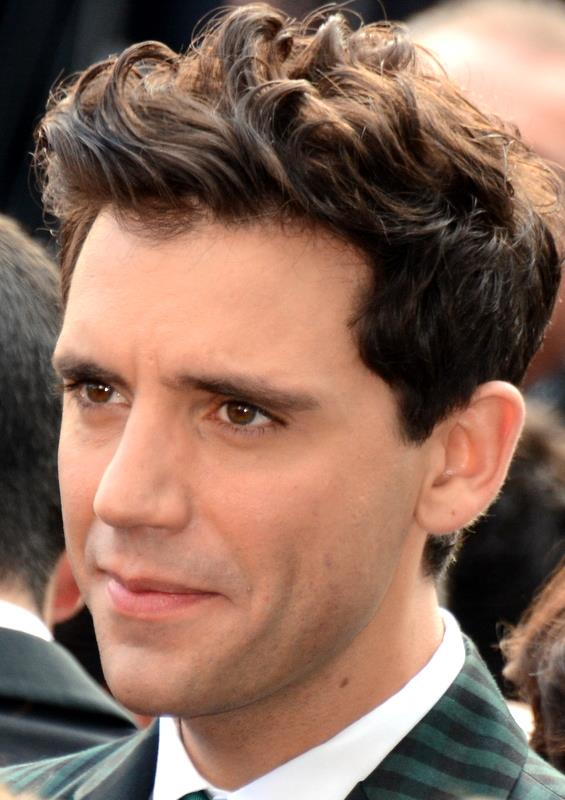
Mika (2025–)

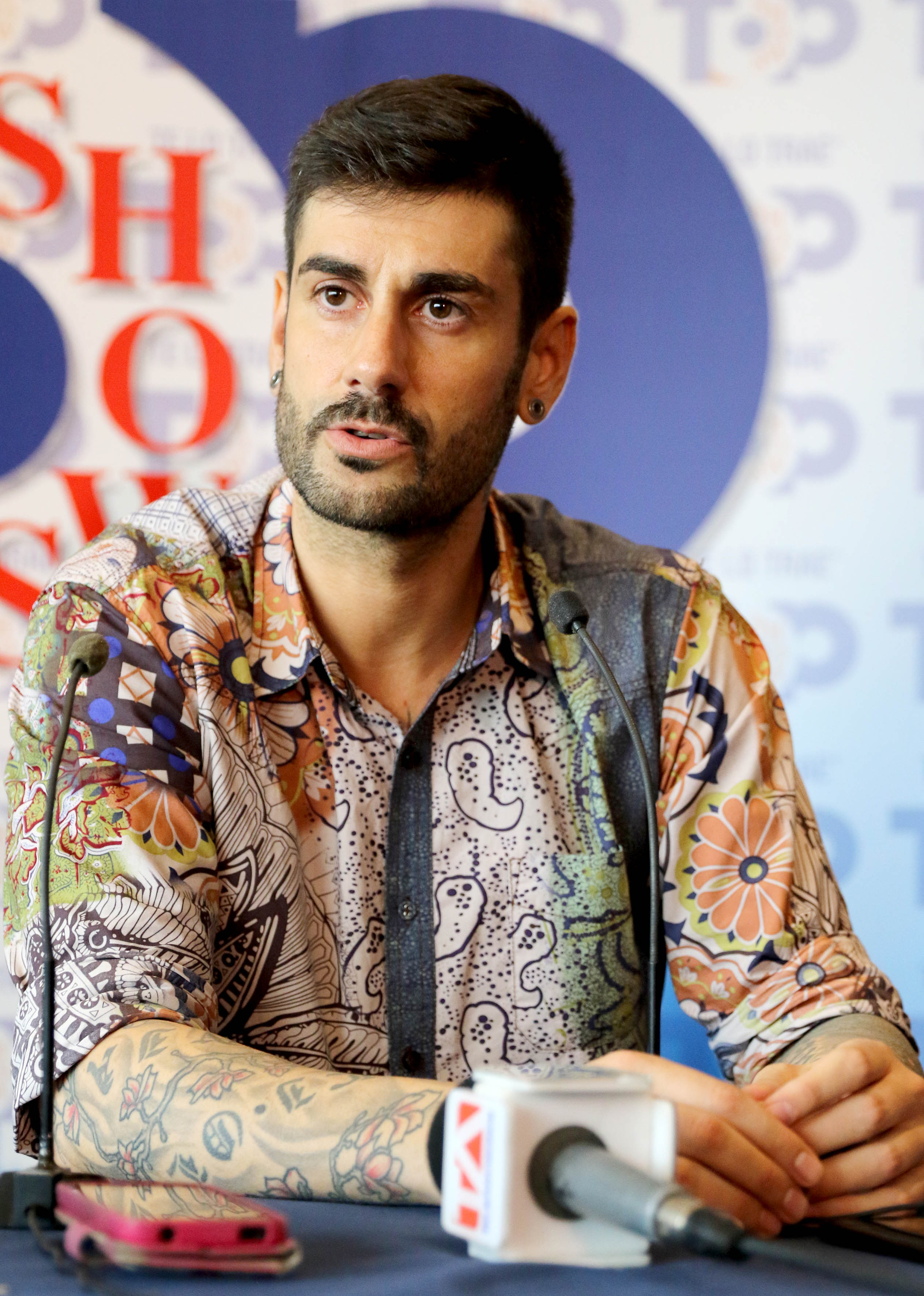
Melendi (2012, 2016, 2026–)

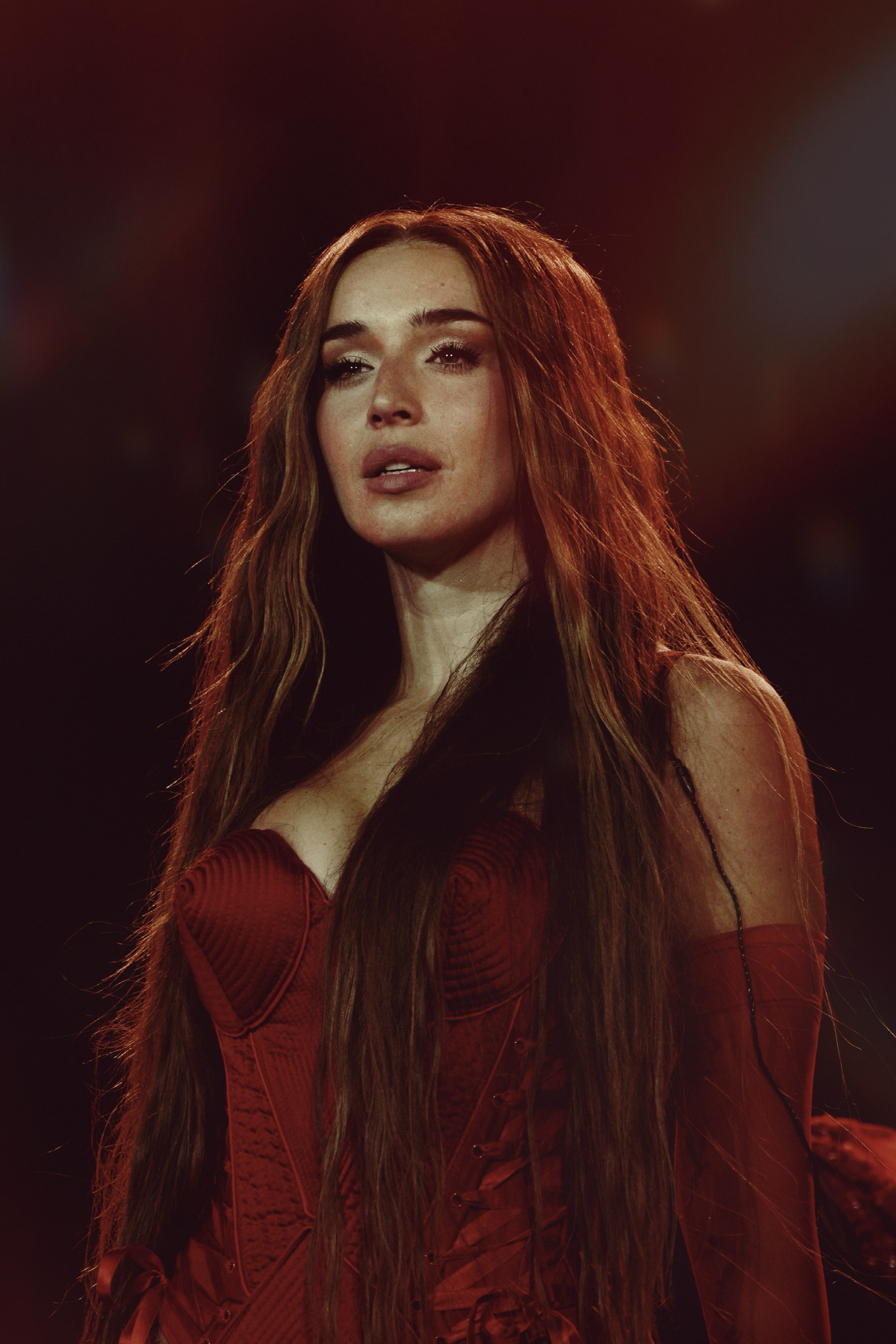
Lola Índigo (2026–)
Former coaches

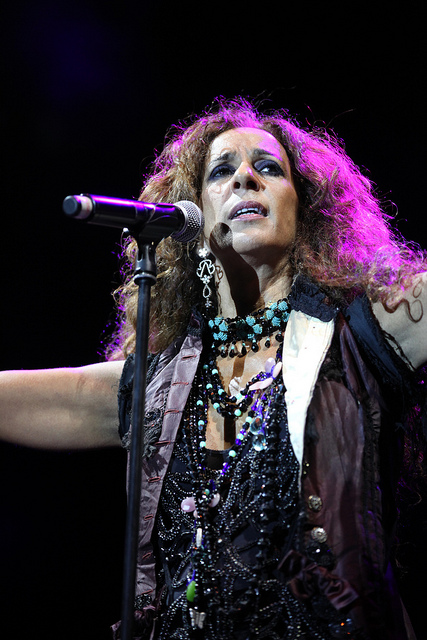
Rosario Flores (2012–2013)

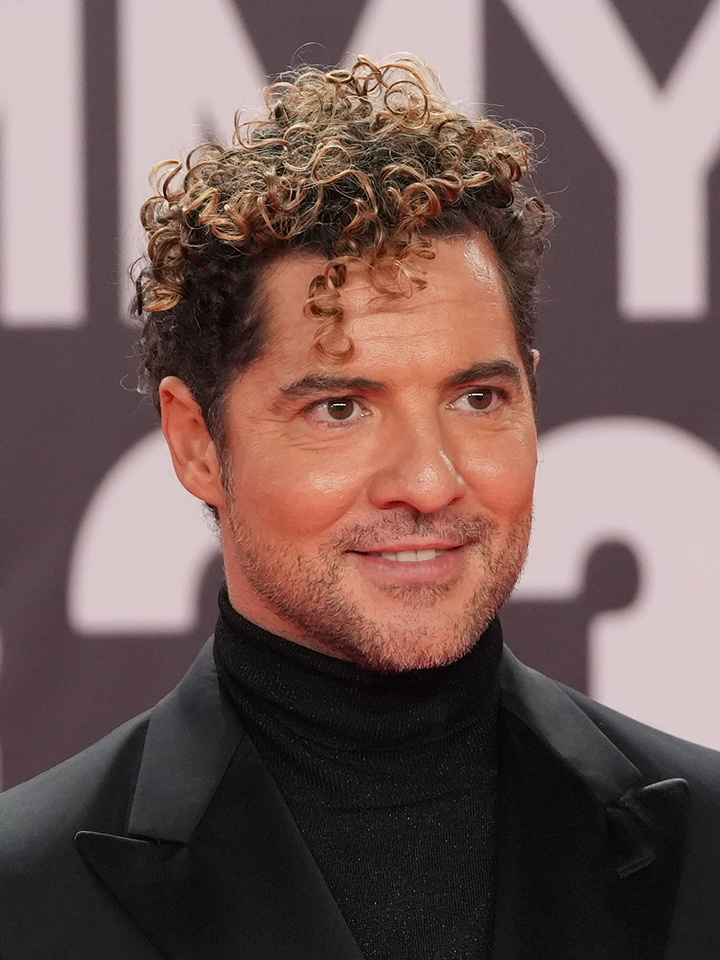
David Bisbal (2012–2013)

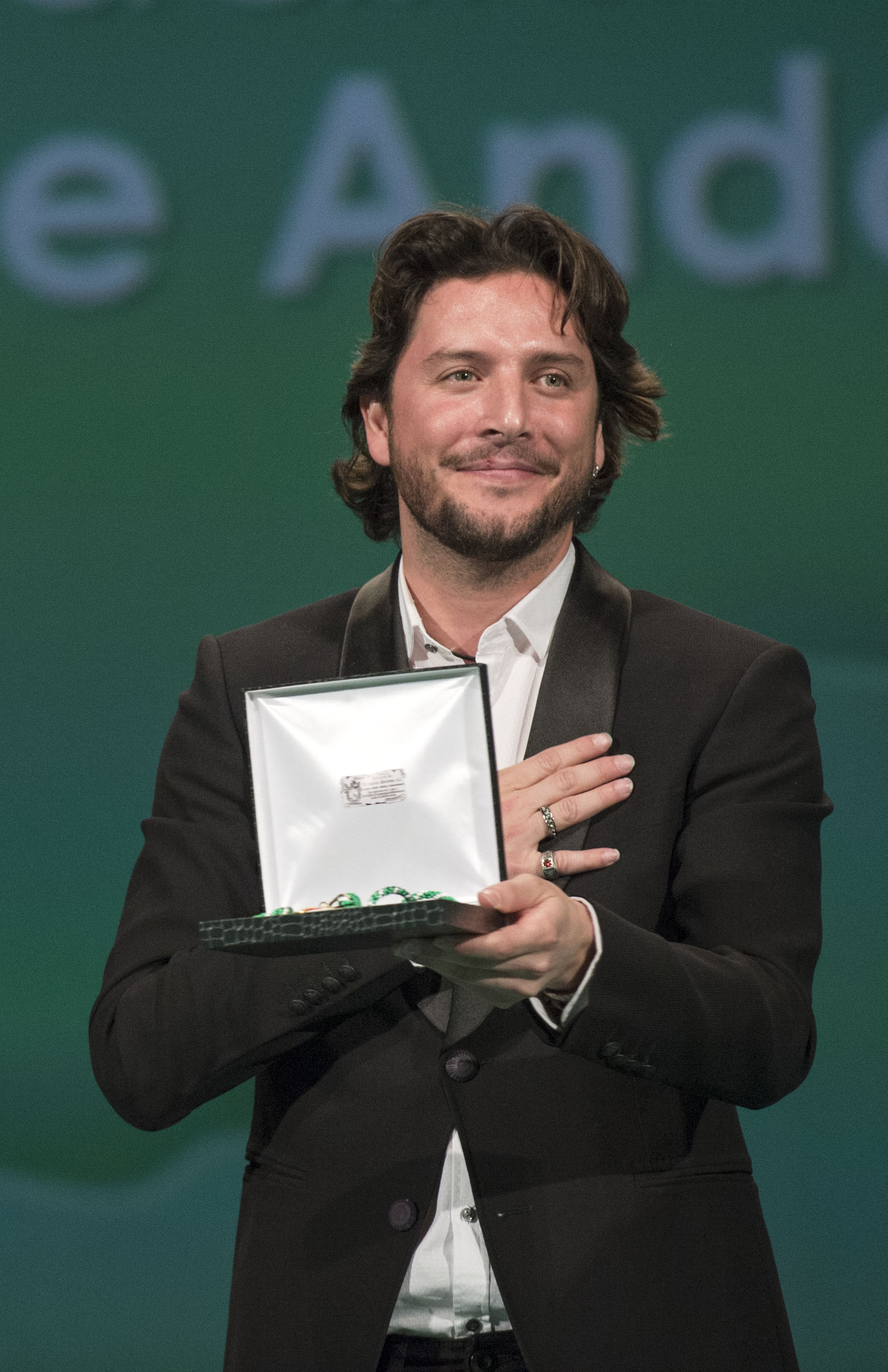
Manuel Carrasco (2016–2017)

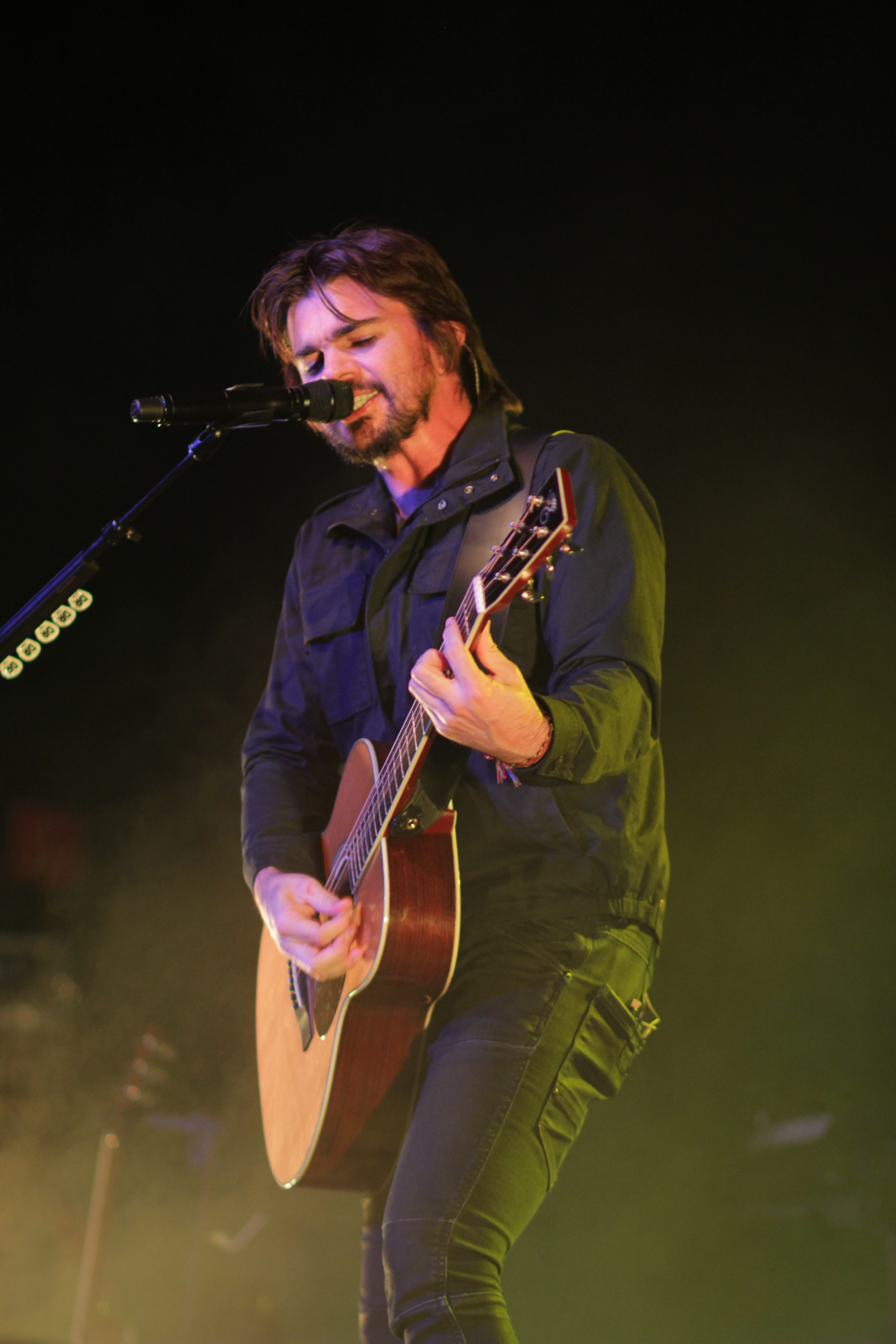
Juanes (2017)

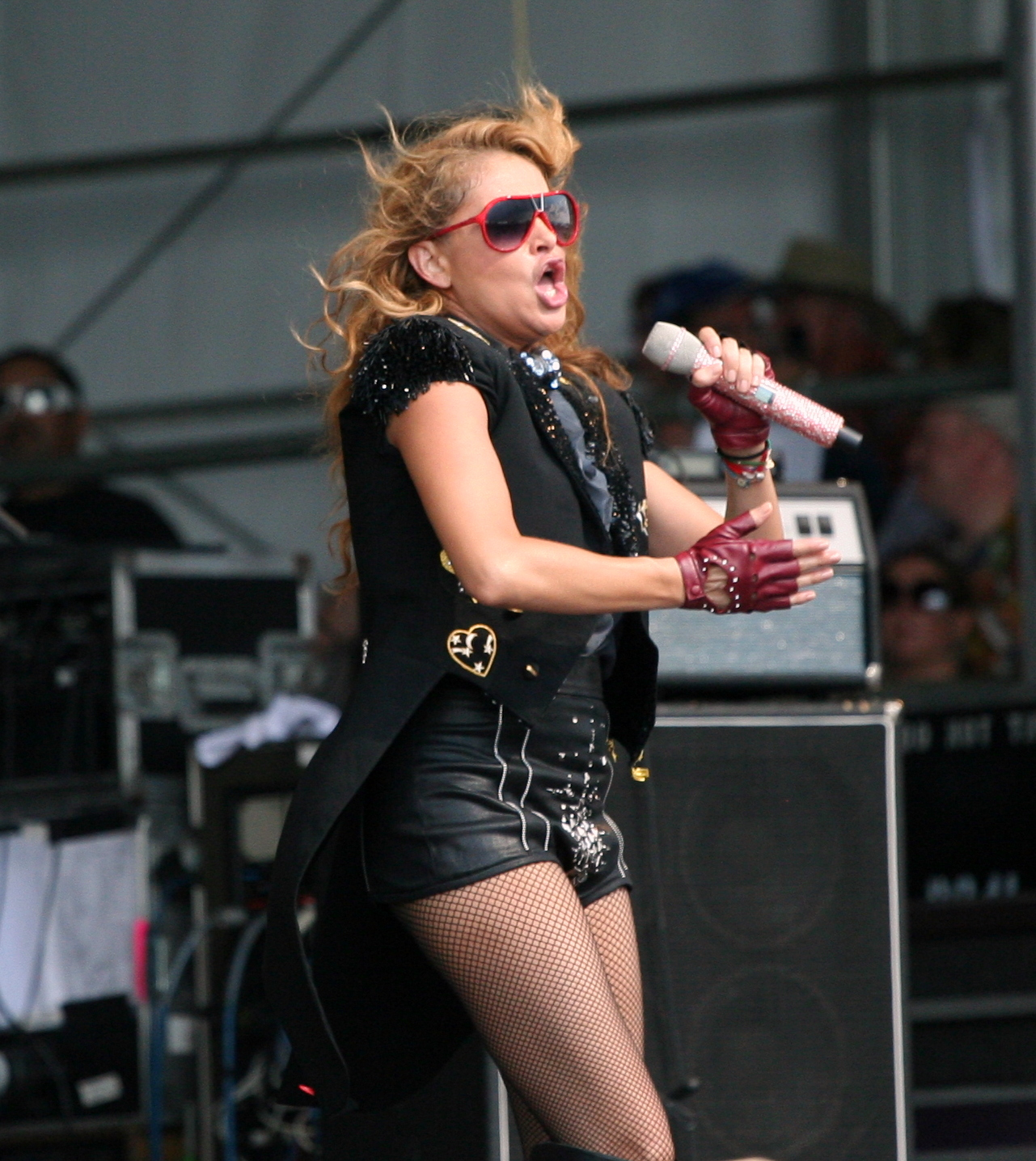
Paulina Rubio (2019)

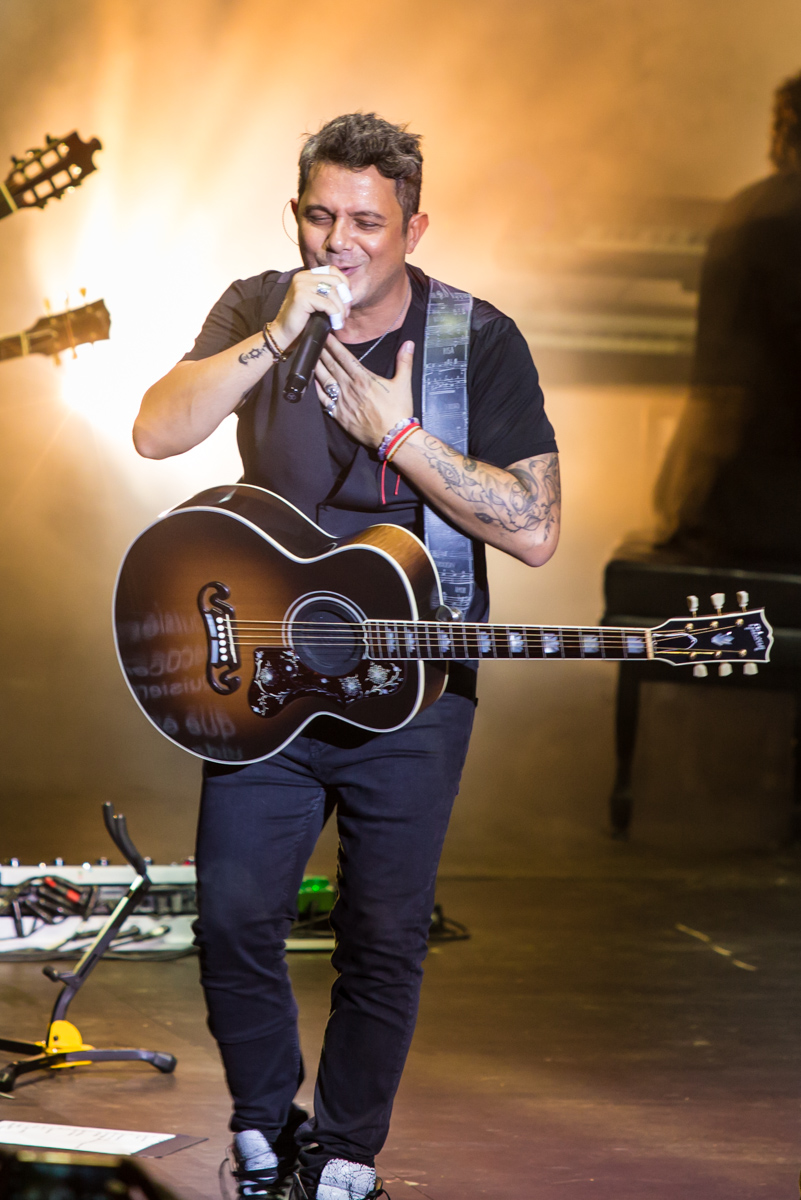
Alejandro Sanz (2015–2016, 2020–2021)

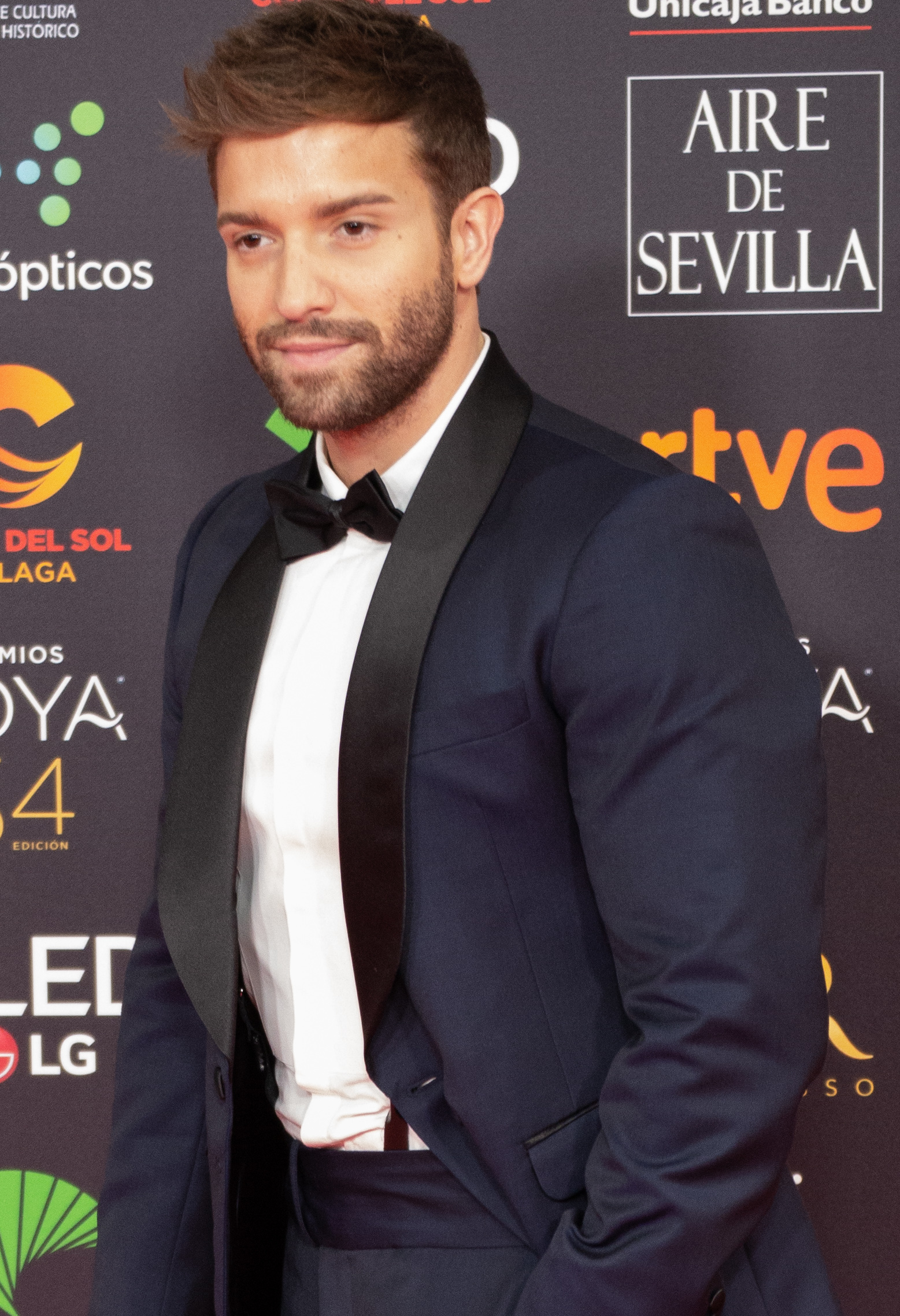
Pablo Alborán (2021)

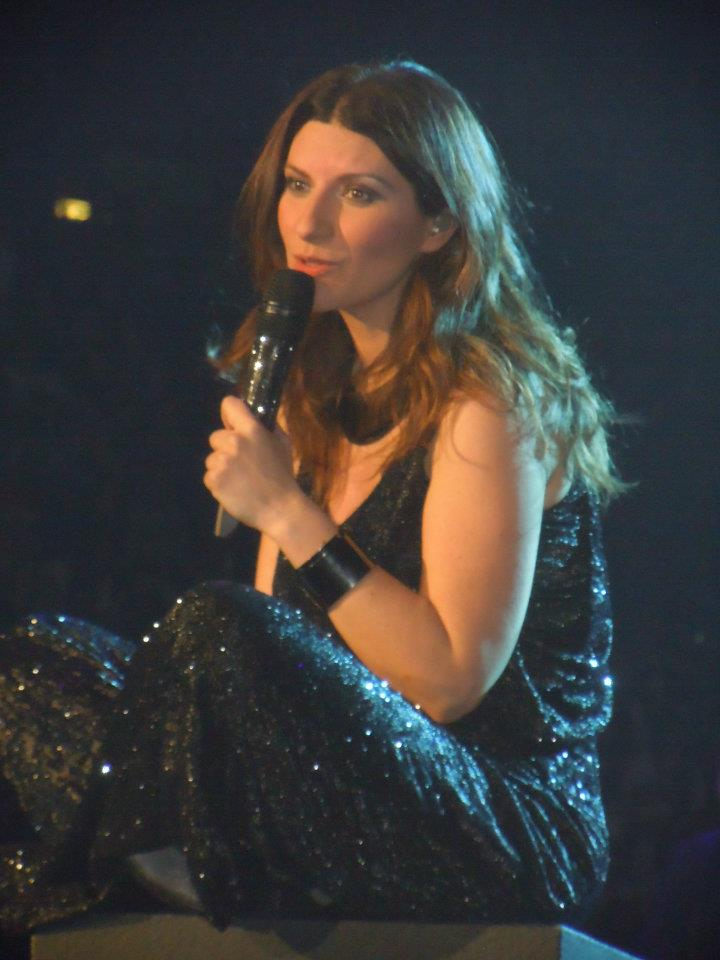
Laura Pausini (2015, 2020, 2022)

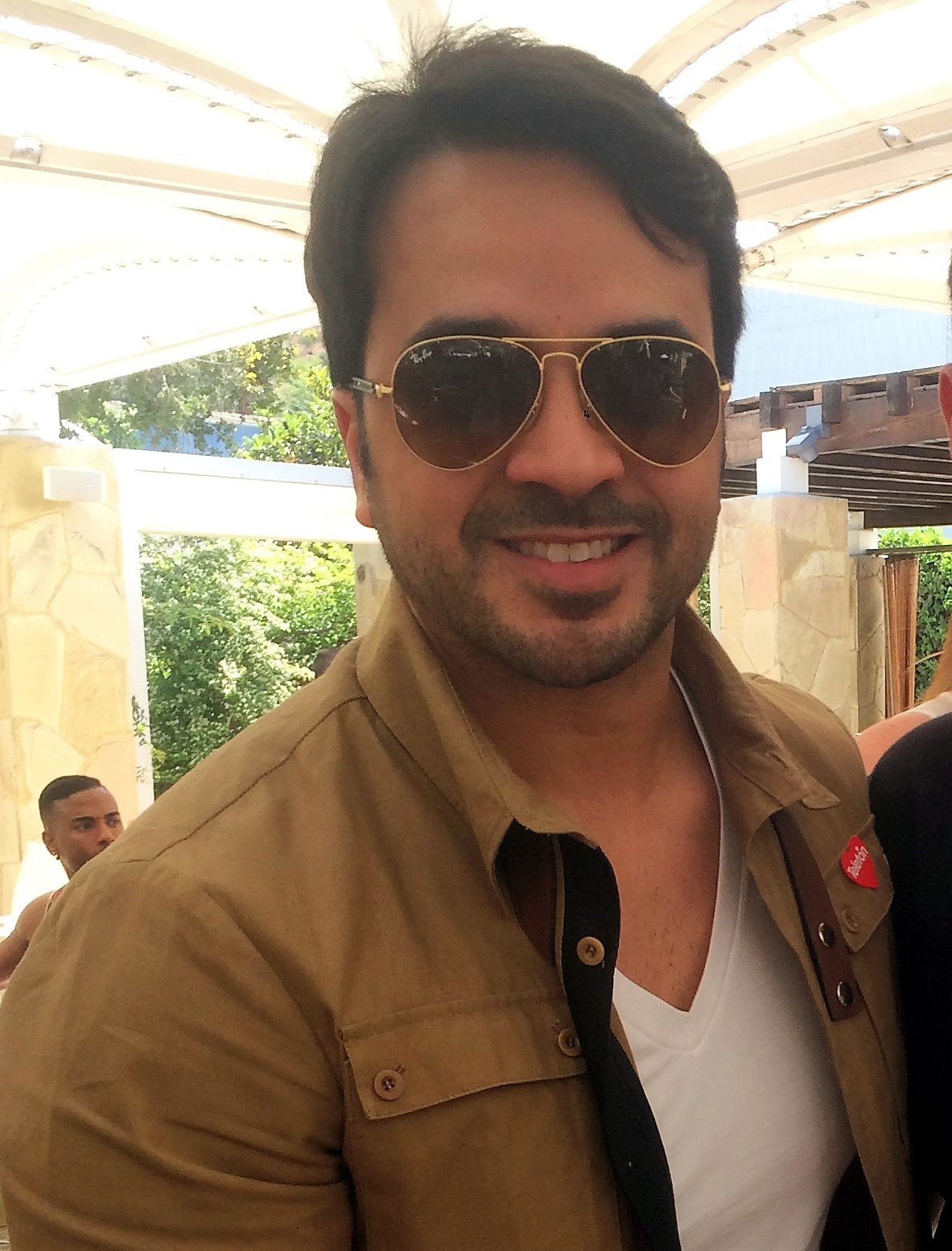
Luis Fonsi (2019, 2021–2024)

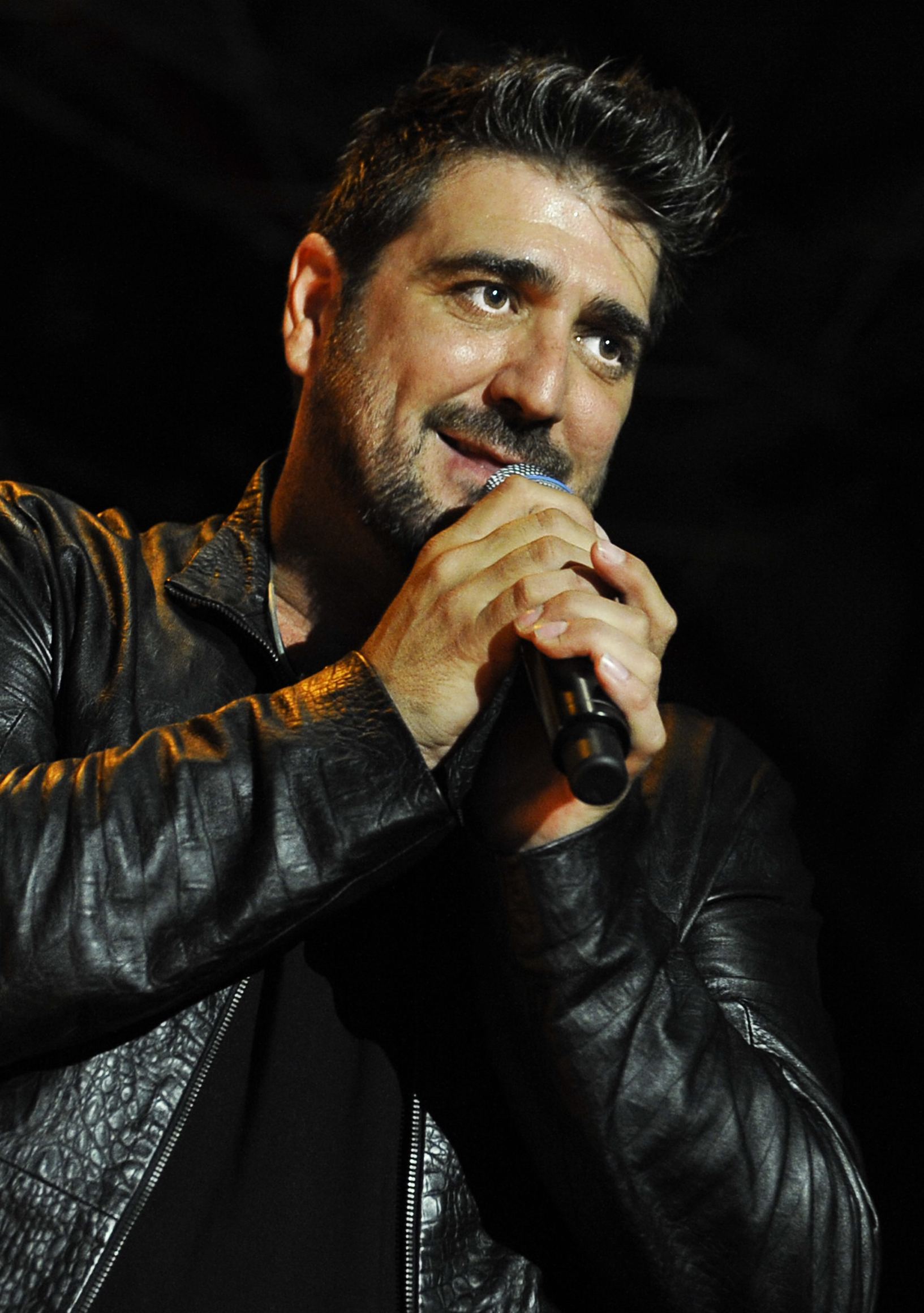
Antonio Orozco (2013–2015, 2019–2020, 2022–2024)

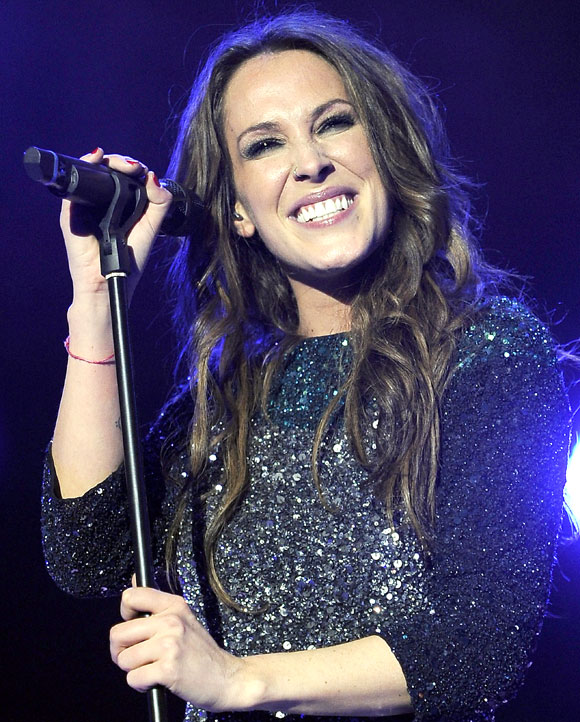
Malú (2012–2017, 2021, 2023–2025)

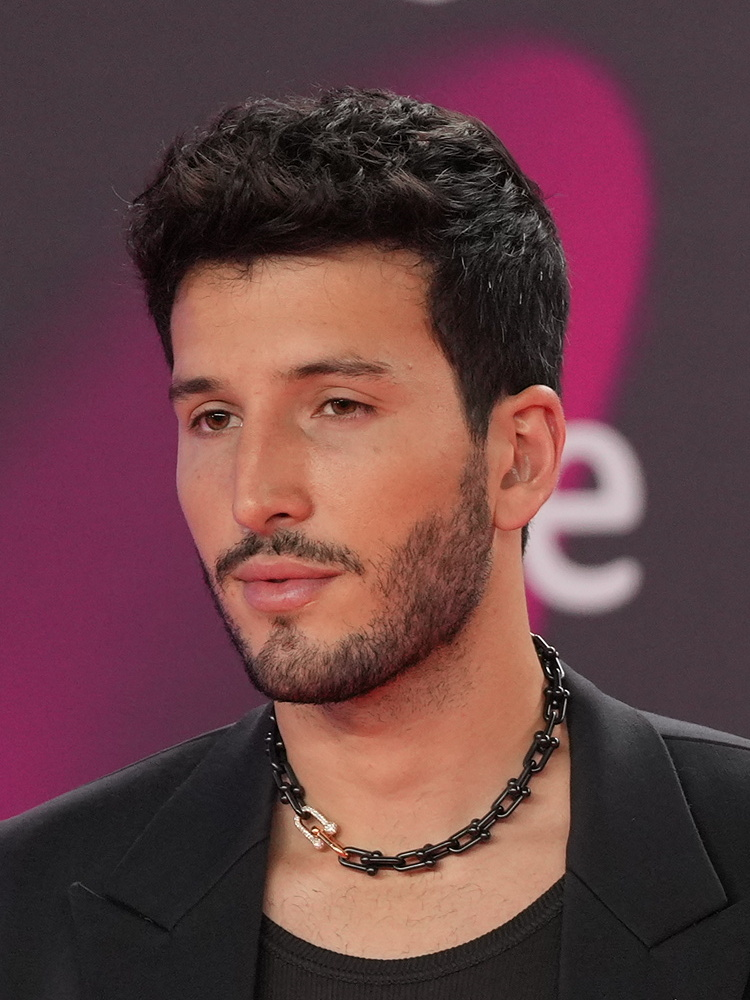
Sebastián Yatra (2025)

== Coaches' advisors ==
Season	Coaches and their advisors			
1	David Bisbal	Rosario Flores	Malú	Melendi
1	Luis Fonsi	Antonio Carmona	Tiziano Ferro	Nek
2	David Bisbal	Rosario Flores	Malú	Antonio Orozco
2	Cali & El Dandee	Coti	Carlos Vives	Juan Magán
3	Alejandro Sanz	Laura Pausini	Malú	Antonio Orozco
3	José Mercé	Álex Ubago	Rosario Flores	Pablo López
4	Alejandro Sanz	Manuel Carrasco	Malú	Melendi
4	José Mercé	Gloria Trevi	Pablo López	Diego Torres
5	Juanes	Manuel Carrasco	Malú	Pablo López
5	Bebe	Miguel Poveda	Niña Pastori	Antonio Orozco
6	Pablo López	Paulina Rubio	Luis Fonsi	Antonio Orozco
6	Miriam Rodríguez	Antonio José	David Bustamante	Karol G
7	Alejandro Sanz	Pablo López	Laura Pausini	Antonio Orozco
7	Tini Stoessel	Sebastián Yatra	Carlos Rivera	Mala Rodríguez
8	Pablo Alborán	Malú	Alejandro Sanz	Luis Fonsi
8	María José Llergo	Beret	Greeicy	David Bisbal
9	Luis Fonsi	Pablo López	Laura Pausini	Antonio Orozco
9	Lola Índigo	Raphael	Vanesa Martín	Mala Rodríguez
9	David Bisbal	Malú	Melendi	Rosario Flores
10	Luis Fonsi	Pablo López	Malú	Antonio Orozco
10	Cali & El Dandee	Lola Índigo	Abraham Mateo	Nathy Peluso
11	Rosario Flores	Mika 1, Vanesa Martín 2, Álvaro de Luna 3	Prince Royce	Dani Fernández
12	Mika	Pablo López	Malú	Sebastián Yatra
12	Carla Morrison	Chiara Oliver	Joaquina	María Becerra
13	Mika	Pablo López	Lola Índigo	Melendi
13	—N/a			

== Series overview ==
Warning: the following table presents a significant amount of different colors.

Teams colour key
Artist from Team Malú	Artist from Team Alejandro	Artist from Team Fonsi
Artist from Team David	Artist from Team Laura	Artist from Team Paulina
Artist from Team Rosario	Artist from Team Manuel	Artist from Team Alborán
Artist from Team Melendi	Artist from Team Pablo	Artist from Team Yatra
Artist from Team Antonio	Artist from Team Juanes

La Voz series overview
Season	Aired	Winner	Runner-up	Third Place	Fourth Place	Winning coach	Hosts
1	2012	Rafa Blas	Jorge González	Maika Barbero	Pau Piqué	David Bisbal	Jesús Vázquez
2	2013	David Barrull	Dina Arriaza	Jaume Mas	Estela Amaya	Malú	Jesús Vázquez
3	2015	Antonio José	Marcos Martins	Maverick López	Joaquín Garli	Antonio Orozco	Jesús Vázquez
4	2016	Irene Caruncho	Carlos Torres	Mario Jiménez	Thais Rudiño	Malú	Jesús Vázquez
5	2017	Alba Gil Santana	Gabrielle Dellolio	Samuel Cuenda	Pedro Hernández	Manuel Carrasco	Jesús Vázquez
6	2019	Andrés Martín	María Espinosa	Javi Moya	Ángel Cortés	Pablo López	Eva González
7	2020	Isaiah Kelly	Johanna Polvillo	Curricé	Paula Espinosa	Laura Pausini	Eva González
8	2021	Inés Manzano	Julio Benavente	Carlos Ángel Valdés	Karina Pasian	Pablo Alborán	Eva González
9	2022	Javier Crespo	Génesis de Jesús	Sergio del Boccio	Ana González	Antonio Orozco	Eva González
10	2023	Elsa Tortonda	Miguel Carrasco	Nereida Sanchón	Pablo Verdeguer	Luis Fonsi	Eva González
11	2024	Manuel Ayra	Lola Eme	Alan Brizuela	Gara Alemán	Antonio Orozco	Eva González
12	2025	Antía Pinal	Oihan Aristizabal	Audrey	Kimy Touw	Pablo López	Eva González
13	2026	Current season					Eva González

== Coaches' results ==
Considering the final placement of the contestants who are members of their team (not the final placement of the coaches):

Coaches' results
Coach	Winner	Runner-up	Third place	Fourth place
Antonio Orozco	Thrice (3, 9, 11)	Twice (7, 10)	4 times (2, 6-7, 10)	—
Pablo López	Twice (6, 12)	Twice (5, 11)	—	Twice (10-11)
Malú	Twice (2, 4)	—	Twice (5, 12)	Twice (1, 3)
Luis Fonsi	Once (10)	Twice (6, 9)	Twice (8, 11)	—
David Bisbal	Once (1)	Once (2)	—	—
Manuel Carrasco	Once (5)	Once (4)	—	—
Laura Pausini	Once (7)	—	Twice (3, 9)	Twice (7, 9)
Pablo Alborán	Once (8)	—	—	—
Alejandro Sanz	—	Twice (3, 8)	—	Twice (4, 8)
Sebastián Yatra	—	Once (12)	—	Once (12)
Rosario Flores	—	Once (1)	—	Once (2)
Melendi	—	—	Twice (1, 4)	—
Juanes	—	—	—	Once (5)
Paulina Rubio	—	—	—	Once (6)
Mika	—	—	—	—
Lola Índigo	TBA			

== Seasons' summaries ==
=== Season 1: 2012 ===
Season 1 premiered on Telecinco on 19 September 2012. The first episode kicked off with 4.591 viewers (30.6% market share), becoming an instant success. The final, on 19 December 2012, was watched by 5.453 million viewers, a market share of 37.3%. The winner of the first season was Rafa Blas from Team David.

=== Season 2: 2013 ===
One week before the successful Season 1 was over, on 13 December 2012, Telecinco announced that they had renewed the show for a second season in 2013. On 22 January 2013, Melendi announced that he would not continue as a coach on the second season. On 5 June 2013, it was confirmed that Melendi would be replaced by Antonio Orozco, whereas Bisbal, Flores and Malú continued. Filming for the second season began on 15 July 2013. The second season premiered on 16 September 2013, garnering 3.438 million viewers (23.3% market share) in the official ratings. The winner of the second season was David Barrull from Team Malú.

=== Season 3: 2015 ===
Filming for the third season began in January 2015. David Bisbal and Rosario Flores were replaced by Alejandro Sanz and Laura Pausini, while Malú and Antonio Orozco continued as coaches. The third season premiered on 23 March 2015 garnering 4.591 million viewers (28.1% market share) in the official ratings. The winner of the third season was Antonio José from Team Antonio.

=== Season 4: 2016 ===
Filming for the fourth season began in June 2016. Antonio Orozco and Laura Pausini were replaced by Melendi, who had been absent since the original season, and Manuel Carrasco, while Malú and Alejandro Sanz continued as coaches. The winner of the fourth season was Irene Caruncho from Team Malú.

=== Season 5: 2017 ===
Filming for the fifth season began in July 2017. Alejandro Sanz and Melendi were replaced by debuting coaches Juanes and Pablo López, while Malú and Manuel Carrasco continued as coaches, completing their fifth and second season as part of the panel. The winner of the fifth season was Alba Gil Santana from Team Manuel.

=== Season 6: 2019 ===
Filming for the sixth season began in November 2018, and it ran from 7 January to 10 April 2019. Pablo López was the only coach from the previous season to continue, while Antonio Orozco returned after two seasons of absence and Luis Fonsi and Paulina Rubio both debuted in the Spanish series. The winner of the sixth season was Andrés Martín from Team Pablo.

=== Season 7: 2020 ===
The seventh season started on 11 September 2020. Antonio Orozco and Pablo López returned as coaches for their fourth and third season, respectively, while Alejandro Sanz and Laura Pausini rejoined the panel after a two and three season hiatus, replacing Paulina Rubio and Luis Fonsi as coaches. The winner of the seventh season was Kelly from Team Laura.

=== Season 8: 2021 ===
The eighth season premiered on 17 September 2021. Alejandro Sanz is the only coach returning from the previous season. He was joined by former coaches Malú and Luis Fonsi, and first-time coach Pablo Alborán, replacing Laura Pausini, Pablo López and Antonio Orozco. The winner of the eighth season was Inés Manzano from Team Alborán.

=== Season 9: 2022 ===
The ninth season premiered on 23 September 2022. Completing his third time on the panel, Luis Fonsi returned as the only coach from the previous season, while Antonio Orozco, Pablo López, and Laura Pausini all three after one-season hiatus for their fifth, fourth, and third season, respectively. This season was produced to be a dedication to the ten-year anniversary of the show. The winner of the ninth season was Javier Crespo from Team Antonio.

=== Season 10: 2023 ===
The tenth season premiered on 15 September 2023. Antonio Orozco, Pablo López, and Luis Fonsi all returned as coaches from the previous season for their sixth, fifth and fourth season, respectively. Meanwhile, Laura Pausini was replaced by Malú, who returns after a one-season hiatus, for her seventh season on the panel. The winner of the tenth season was Elsa Tortonda from Team Fonsi.

=== Season 11: 2024 ===
The eleventh season premiered on 13 September 2024. The coaching panel remained the same as the previous season for the first time in the history of the show. Malú, Antonio Orozco, Pablo López, and Luis Fonsi returned for their eighth, seventh, sixth, and fifth seasons, respectively. The winner of the eleventh season was Manuel Ayra from Team Antonio.

=== Season 12: 2025 ===
The twelfth season premiered on 19 September 2025. The coaching panel consists of returning coaches Malú and Pablo López, who both return for their ninth and seventh seasons, respectively. Mika, who previously served as a coach on The Voice France and The Voice France All Stars, and Sebastián Yatra, who previously served as a coach on La Voz Kids, both debuted as coaches, replacing Antonio Orozco and Luis Fonsi, respectively. The winner of the twelfth season was Antía Pinal from Team Pablo.

=== Season 13: 2026 ===
The thirteenth season premiered on 18 September 2026. The coaching panel consists of returning coaches Pablo López and Mika, who both return for their eighth and second seasons, respectively. Former coach Melendi returned after an eight-season hiatus, replacing Sebastián Yatra, and former La Voz Kids coach Lola Índigo debuted on the panel, replacing Malú. Former La Voz Kids coach Vanesa Martín joined as a fifth coach beginning in the battles by giving select previously eliminated artists a second chance.

== Coaches semifinalists and finalists ==
- Winner
- Runner-up
- Third place
- Fourth place
- Semi-finalists
- First names listed are the finalists: winners in **bold** and other finalists in italic.

Season	Coaches and contestants			
1	Team David	Team Rosario	Team Malú	Team Melendi
1	**Rafa Blas**; Paco Arrojo; Yanela Brooks; Brequette Shana; Nieves Hidalgo; Lola Dorado	Jorge González; Angélica Leyva; Anabella Arregui; Emmanuel Lehmann; Anael Santana; Mónica Guech	Pau Piqué; Iolanda Rodríguez; Núria Martínez; Rebeca Moscardó; Efrén García; Héctor Roldán	Maika Barbero; Neus Ferri; Susana del Rio; Paula Rojo; Eduardo Ruimán; Claritzel Miyares
2	Team David	Team Rosario	Team Malú	Team Antonio
2	Dina Arriaza; Darío Benítez; Jordi Galán; Álex Escribano; Tina Riobo; Susana Sheiman	Estela Amaya; Idoia Bediaga; Ivet Vidal; Gabrielle Serrini; Sandra Rodrigo; Brigitte Emaga	**David Barrull**; Silverio Belmonte; Amynata Sow; Mandy Santos; Alba Lucía López; Janyssha Lyon	Jaume Mas; Damon Robinson; Cristina Rueda; Ainhoa Aguilar; Agustín Tirado; David Velardo
3	Team Alejandro	Team Laura	Team Malú	Team Antonio
3	Marcos Martins; José Manuel Más; Irene Lombard; Saúl Queirós; Álex Gómez; Iván & Mikel Herzog	Maverick López; Jessica "La Flaka"; Rai Machado; Pablo Galiano; Marina Blanot; Alyre	Joaquín Garli; Diana Tarín; Juañarito; Diego Cartón; Remedios Castro; Roxy Rosario	**Antonio José**; Raquel Garrido; Alba & Marta; Antonio Tomás; Juanmi Castillero; Nalaya Brown
4	Team Alejandro	Team Manuel	Team Malú	Team Melendi
4	Thais Rudiño; Esperanza Delgado; Manu González; Carlos de Pepa; Jeffrey Pop; Noelia de la Flor	Carlos Torres; José María Moreno; Esmeralda Colette; María Cambas; Álex Forriols; Lieta Molinet	**Irene Caruncho**; Mayte Maya; Suzanna Abellán; Shanti Gordi; María La Caria; Cris Ases	Mario Jiménez; Sahra Lee; Belinda Falcón; Bandile; Paul Alone; Deborah Ayo
5	Team Juanes	Team Manuel	Team Malú	Team Pablo
5	Pedro Hernández; Elena Alberdi; Samuel Guedes; Berta Bittersweet; Carmelo Jiménez; Vincent Loukas	**Alba Gil Santana**; Carlos Villa; Omar Moro; Fredrik Strand; Sergio Bermejo; Luna García Perea	Samuel Cuenda; Charo Giménez; Ricardo Mestre; Genara Cortés; Adib Sayegh; Victor Branch	Gabrielle Dellolio; Laura Rubio; Kamila Velázquez; Jennifer Fourcart; Renzo Santana; Jesús Martí
6	Team Pablo	Team Paulina	Team Fonsi	Team Antonio
6	**Andrés Martín**; Auba Estela Murillo; Javier Erro; Palomy López	Ángel Cortés; Viki Lafuente; Hugo Marlo; Susana Montaña	María Espinosa; Linda Rodrigo; Joel Lion; Álex Palomo	Javi Moya; Marcelino Damion; Lorena Fernández; Lía Kali
7	Team Alejandro	Team Pablo	Team Laura	Team Antonio
7	Adam Ainouz; Rafael Ruiz; Haizea Gómez	Miguelichi; Roger Padrós; Dayana Emma	**Kelly**; Paula Espinosa; Carlota Palacios; Juan José Alba	Johanna Polvillo; Curricé; Antonio Villar
8	Team Alborán	Team Malú	Team Alejandro	Team Fonsi
8	**Inés Manzano**; Marina Jiménez; Carlos Galí; Toyemi; Tyler Middlemiss	Besay Pérez; Ezequiel Montoya; Fran Valenzuela; Jesús Peguero	Julio Benavente; Karina Pasian; Alice Reay; Beli	Carlos Ángel Valdés; Diana Larios; Daniel Gómez; Irene Nández
9	Team Fonsi	Team Pablo	Team Laura	Team Antonio
9	Génesis Jesús; Antón Pérard; Juan García; Tayra Taylor	Ana Corbel; Javier Santacruz; Alba Ed-Dounia; Teresa Luís	Ana González; Sergio del Boccio; Fran Flores; Gabriel Herrera	**Javier Crespo**; Salma Díaz; Jonatan Santiago; Juan Motos
10	Team Fonsi	Team Pablo	Team Malú	Team Antonio
10	**Elsa Tortonda**; Phindile Felicia Ndlovu; La Llave; Lucía Campa	Pablo Verdeguer; Lucas Feliz; María del Mar Santoyo; Julieta Carrasco	Larisa Rodríguez; Dária Shevchenko; Luna Orleans; Bárbara Calipso	Miguel Carrasco; Nereida Sanchón; Noemí Fernández; Alejandro Caraza
11	Alan Brizuela; Ricardo Alonso; Rocío Torío; La Jose; Lucas Silveira	Lola Eme; Gara Alemán; Jaime Allepuz; Pol Cardona	Diego García; Erwin Hernández; Salvador Rodríguez; Yael Meta	**Manuel Ayra**; Flori; Ginés Gonzalez
12	Team Mika	Team Pablo	Team Malú	Team Yatra
12	Javier Barrera; Pedro Henrique; Diva Barbosa; Jake Miagra	**Antía Pinal**; Aroa Salaño; Estefanía Gaitan; Ferran Amador	Audrey; Victoria Rosales; Elena Santana; Nayo	Oihan Aristizabal; Kimy Touw; Cayetano Fernández; El Gato CHP
13	Team Mika	Team Pablo	Team Lola	Team Melendi
13	Aura Gómez; Carlos Martínez; Rubén Mengod	Jhon Jairo Azuero; Lúcia Baizán; Adriana Moreno	Raúl Bagán; Kika Cardoso; Estrella Marina; Irene Molina; Borja Piñero	Enrique Chávez; Manuela de la Fuente; Ana Muñoz; Marta Salas; José Torres

== All Stars edition ==
La Voz All Stars is the Spanish singing competition produced by Atresmedia in collaboration with ITV Studios, aired on Antena 3 The inaugural season was hosted by Eva González and Juanra Bonet. The coaches for the first season consisted of Luis Fonsi, Pablo López, Malú, and Antonio Orozco.

== Series overview ==
Spanish La Voz All Stars series overview
Season	Aired	Winner	Runners-up			Winning coach	Presenter	Coaches (chairs' order)			
Season	Aired	Winner	Runners-up			Winning coach	Presenter	1	2	3	4
1	2023	Toyemi	Dan Rain	Diana Larios	Paula Espinosa	Antonio Orozco	Eva González	Fonsi	Pablo	Malú	Antonio

== Teams ==
Winner
Runner-up

Season	Luis Fonsi	Pablo López	Malú	Antonio Orozco
1	Dan Rain; Gonzalo Alhambra; Andrés Balado; Carlos Ángel Valdes	Paula Espinosa; Curricé; Ana González; Javier Erro	Diana Larios; Rafael 'El Bomba'; Marina Jiménez; Besay Pérez	Toyemi; Miguelichi Lopéz; Auba Murillo; Javi Moya

== Awards ==
Awards and nominations received by La voz
Year	Award	Category	Nominee	Result	Ref
2012	Premios Ondas	Mejor Programa de Entretenimiento (Best Entertainment Program)	La voz	Won	
2013	Premios Iris	Mejor Programa de Entretenimiento (Best Entertainment Program)	La voz	Won	
