= La Voz All Stars season 1 =

La Voz All Stars
- Season 1
- Hosted by: Eva González; Juanra Bonet (backstage host)
- Coaches: Luis Fonsi; Pablo López; Malú; Antonio Orozco
- Winner: Toyemi
- Winning coach: Antonio Orozco
- Runners-up: Dan Rain; Paula Espinosa; Diana Larios

Release
- Original network: Antena 3
- Original release: 22 December – 29 December 2023

The first season of La Voz All Stars premiered on 22 December 2023 on Antena 3. The coaches for the spinoff consist of season 10 coaches: Luis Fonsi, Pablo López, Malú, and Antonio Orozco. Eva González and Juanra Bonet host of the program. The format of this spinoff consists of each coach filling a team of 4 artists (16 total). After the first week (blind auditions), the 4 artists on each team sing in the episode broadcast the following week in the final to be declared the winner of La Voz All Stars.

Toyemi from Team Antonio was announced as the first winner of La Voz All Stars on 29 December 2023, making Antonio Orozco's fourth win out of all versions of La Voz Spain, and the first coach to win more than 3 times.

== Teams ==
- Winner
- Runner-up
- Eliminated in the Top 8
- Eliminated in the Duels

Coaches	Top 16 Artists			
Luis Fonsi	Dan Rain	Gonzalo Alhambra	Andrés Balado	Carlos Ángel Valdes
Pablo López	Paula Espinosa	Ana González	Curricé	Javier Erro
Malú	Diana Larios	Rafael 'El Bomba'	Besay Pérez	Marina Jiménez
Antonio Orozco	Toyemi	Javi Moya	Miguelichi Lopéz	Auba Murillo

== Blind Auditions ==
In the blind auditions, each coach has four spots to fill on their respective team. Additionally, each coach gets one "super block" to prevent another coach from getting the artist.

✔	Coach pressed "QUIERO TU VOZ" button
	Artist elected to join this coach's team
	Artist defaulted to this coach's team
	Artist eliminated as no coach pressing "QUIERO TU VOZ" button
✘	Coach pressed "QUIERO TU VOZ" button, but was super blocked by another coach from getting the artist
	Super blocked by Fonsi; Super blocked by Pablo; Super blocked by Malú; Super blocked by Antonio

Episode	Order	Artist	Song	Coach's and artist's choices			
Episode	Order	Artist	Song	Fonsi	Pablo	Malú	Antonio
Episode 1 (22 December)	1	Rafael 'El Bomba'	"El trato"	—	—	✔	✘
Episode 1 (22 December)	2	Carlos Ángel Valdes	"Jealous"	✔	—	—	✘
Episode 1 (22 December)	3	Javier Erro	"Hábito de ti"	✔	✔	—	—
Episode 1 (22 December)	4	Andrés Balado	"Purple Rain"	✔	—	✔	—
Episode 1 (22 December)	5	Ana González	"María de la O"	✔	✔	✔	✔
Episode 1 (22 December)	6	Linda Rodrigo	"Warrior"	—	—	—	—
Episode 1 (22 December)	7	Diana Larios	"Nessun dorma"	✔	—	✔	✔
Episode 1 (22 December)	8	Marina Jiménez	"Te espero aquí"	✔	✔	✔	—
Episode 1 (22 December)	9	Antón Perard	"Quelqu'un m'a dit"	—	—	—	—
Episode 1 (22 December)	10	Curricé	"Radioactive"	✘	✔	—	✔
Episode 1 (22 December)	11	Gonzalo Alhambra	"Pienso en tu mirá"	✔	—	—	—
Episode 1 (22 December)	12	Beli Molina	"Me quedo contigo"	—	—	—	—
Episode 1 (22 December)	13	Paula Espinosa	"Corazón partío"	—	✔	—	—
Episode 1 (22 December)	14	Miguelichi Lopéz	"Lágrimas negras"	—	Team full	—	✔
Episode 1 (22 December)	15	Toyemi	"I'm Here"	—	Team full	—	✔
Episode 1 (22 December)	16	Besay Pérez	"Abriré la puerta"	✔	Team full	✔	✔
Episode 1 (22 December)	17	Auba Murillo	"Aunque tú no lo sepas"	✘	Team full	Team full	✔
Episode 1 (22 December)	18	Dan Rain	"Fly Me to the Moon"	✔	Team full	Team full	—
Episode 1 (22 December)	19	Palomy López	"Ángel caido"	Team full	Team full	Team full	—
Episode 1 (22 December)	20	Javi Moya	"Contigo"	Team full	Team full	Team full	✔

== Finale ==
The finale aired on 29 December 2023. In the first round, a coach picked one of their artists to challenge an artist from another coach's team, with the winner of the challenge being decided by the public vote. In the second round, the Top 8 each performed a solo song. Toyemi from Team Antonio was crowned winner of La Voz All Stars.

=== Episode 2 (29 December) ===
==== Round one ====
Due to the results of this round being solely for the artist and not for the coach, it was possible that not every coach would be represented in the second phase of the finale. However, every coach did have at least one artist from their team win the duel.

Duels results
Order	Challenger			Challenged		
Order	Coach	Song	Artist	Artist	Song	Coach
1	Pablo López	"Don't Rain on My Parade"	Javier Erro	Dan Rain	"Quizás"	Luis Fonsi
2	Malú	"Que siempre sea verano"	Marina Jiménez	Ana González	"Hablame del mar marinero"	Pablo López
3	Luis Fonsi	"Sería Fácil"	Carlos Ángel Valdes	Toyemi	"Halo"	Antonio Orozco
4	Antonio Orozco	"Qué bonita la vida"	Auba Murillo	Paula Espinosa	"Guantanamera"	Pablo López
5	Pablo López	"No dudaría"	Curricé	Miguelichi Lopéz	"El Lado Oscuro"	Antonio Orozco
6	Malú	"Con los años que me quedan"	Besay Pérez	Gonzalo Alhambra	"Cuando nadie me ve"	Luis Fonsi
7	Luis Fonsi	"It's a Man's Man's Man's World"	Andrés Balado	Diana Larios	"Never Enough"	Malú
8	Antonio Orozco	"No Me Lo Creo"	Javi Moya	Rafael 'El Bomba'	"La Quiero a Morir"	Malú

==== Round two ====
Top 8 results
Coach	Order	Artist	Song	Result
Luis Fonsi	1	Gonzalo Alhambra	"Lucía"	Finalist
Pablo López	2	Curricé	"Locked Out of Heaven"	Finalist
Antonio Orozco	3	Toyemi	"A puro dolor"	Winner
Malú	4	Diana Larios	"Hijo de la luna"	Runner-up
Pablo López	5	Ana González	"Al alba"	Finalist
Luis Fonsi	6	Dan Rain	"My Way"	Runner-up
Malú	7	Rafael 'El Bomba'	"Si a veces hablo de ti"	Finalist
Pablo López	8	Paula Espinosa	"El patio"	Runner-up
