= Rafa Blas =

Spanish rock and heavy metal singer

Rafael Martínez Carpena, known as Rafa Blas (born 8 November 1986, in Albacete), is a Spanish rock and heavy metal-singer, mostly known as the winner of Spanish talent show La Voz in 2012. Before being a part of La Voz, he was the lead singer of melodic heavy metal band Matavys (2005–2010) and Toledo-based power metal-band Nocturnia (2010–2013).

After winning La Voz, Rafa begun his solo career as Rafa Blas and released his debut album Mi Voz in 2013 via Universal Music. Two years later, he released his second solo album Sin Mirar Atrás. This time via Maldito Records.

On April 2, 2023, it was confirmed that Rafa Blas is the new singer of Mägo de Oz, after the departure of Javier Dominguez "Zeta".

== Discography ==
=== Matavys ===
- Demo (Independent) - 2007
- Tu Destino (Molusco Producciones) - 2009

=== Nocturnia ===
- Sin Retorno (Independent) - 2012

=== Mägo de Oz ===
- Alicia En El Metalverso - 2024

=== Solo ===
==== Studio albums ====
- Mi Voz (Universal Music) - 2013
- Sin Mirar Atrás (Maldito Records) - 2015

==== Singles ====
- "Hijo De La Luna" - 2013
- "Vivir Morir" - 2013
- "Sigo Aquí" - 2013
- "Sin Ti No Soy Nada" - 2014
- "Hoy Tengo Ganas De Ti" - 2015
- "Soy Yo" - 2015
- "Últimas Cartas" - 2017
- "Eloise" - 2017
- "It's Your Time" - 2017
- "You're My Heart, You're My Soul" - 2018
- "We Are The Ones" - 2019
- "Fire In My Heart" - 2019
- "Alive" - 2021
