= Mazuecos (surname) =

Mazuecos is a surname. Notable people with the surname include:

- Antonio José Sánchez Mazuecos (born 1995), Spanish singer
- José Manuel Catalá Mazuecos (born 1985), Spanish footballer
