= Antonio José Sánchez Mazuecos =

Spanish singer (born 1995)

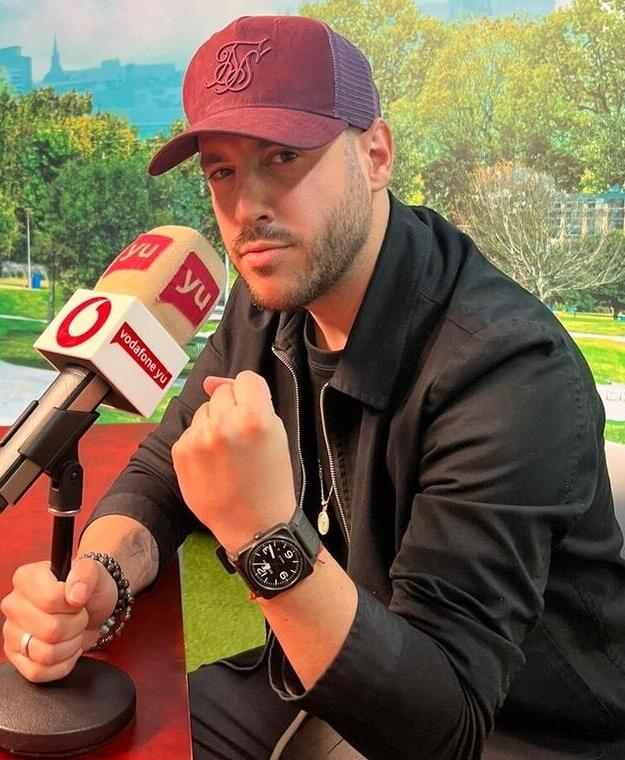
- Antonio José in 2022

Background information
- Born: 2 January 1995 (age 31); Palma del Río, Spain
- Genres: Flamenco; pop; Latin pop
- Occupation: Singer
- Instrument: Vocals
- Years active: 2005–present
- Website: antoniojose.es

Antonio José Sánchez Mazuecos (born 2 January 1995), known professionally as Antonio José, is a Spanish singer. He first gained recognition in 2005, after placing second in the Junior Eurovision Song Contest 2005 with the song "Te traigo flores".

In 2015, he won the third season of La Voz, a Spanish talent show. This allowed him to publish an album with Universal Music Group, having at the time already published two albums before. Since then, Antonio José has released six more albums, with the most recent one being released in 2026.

== Early life ==
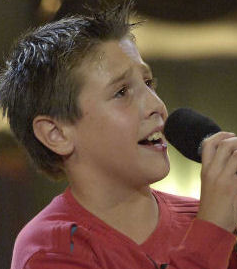
Antonio José during the final of the Spanish preselection for Junior Eurovision Song Contest 2005

Antonio José was born on 2 January 1995 in the town of Palma del Río, Córdoba, Spain. His father, Antonio Sánchez, is an AVE maintenance technician, and his mother, María Mazuecos, is a housewife and fond of music. Since childhood he has been a football fan. His father, who was the local football coach, tried to make him a professional player, and Antonio José was successful, becoming runner-up in national futsal competitions. However, his mother tried to bring him closer to the world of music, taking her son regularly to castings. He also assisted to singing and guitar lessons from a young age.

In August 2005, when he was 10, he participated in the television show Veo, Veo, directed by Canal Sur, getting second place. Afterwards, he appeared at the casting of the show organized by Televisión Española Gente de Primera. This show aimed to select the representative of Spain in the Junior Eurovision Song Contest 2005. Antonio José got the pass to the contest on October 2.

In November 2005, he finally participated in the Junior Eurovision Song Contest 2005 in Hasselt (Belgium), where he represented his country with the song Te traigo flores (I bring you flowers), dedicated to his recently deceased grandmother. Antonio José got second place with 146 points, just 3 points below the winner, the also 10-year-old Belarusian Ksenia Sitnik with her song My vmeste (We are together, 149 points). The inhabitants of his town, including the then mayor Salvador Blanco, celebrated in the streets and congratulated him on his performance in the contest. During all this time, Antonio José did not give up football, keeping it as one of his passions.

== Career ==
Shortly after his participation in Junior Eurovision, Antonio José published his first album, Te traigo flores, with the same name of the song he sang in the contest. This album combines flamenco, characteristic of his region, with Latin rhythms. 4 years later, in 2009, he published his second album, Todo vuelve a empezar (Everything starts again), with songs reflecting teenage situations in the form of rock, pop, funk or ballads.

In 2015, he participated at the third season of the reality talent show La Voz (The Voice). Antonio José has stated that it was his mother the one who called the contest to present him. Being on Antonio Orozco's team, he became one of the four finalists. He chose to interpret the song Aprendiz (Apprentice), by Malú, one of the coaches of the contest. Antonio José won the contest, which allowed him to record an album with Universal Music Group. This album came out just a month later his victory in the contest, and was titled El viaje (The journey).

Afterwards, in 2016, Antonio José published Senti2 ("two" is pronounced in Spanish as "dos", therefore meaning "sentidos", feelings), in 2017, A un milímetro de ti (One millimeter away from you), and in 2019, Antídoto (Antidote). The latter reached great popularity in Spain, being the best-selling album in the country at the date of its release.

== Personal life ==
After several years of speculation, Antonio José revealed his relationship with Spanish model Marta Marchena in 2020.

== Discography ==
=== Albums ===
As of 2026, he has published nine albums:

- Te traigo flores (2005)
- Todo vuelve a empezar (2009)
- El viaje (2015)
- Senti2 (2016)
- A un milímetro de ti (2017)
- Antídoto (2019)
- Fénix (2021)
- El Pacto (2023)
- Luz (2026)

=== Songs ===
Selected songs:

- "De qué manera" (2015)
- "Por si llegamos a tiempo" (2015)
- "Aquí estoy yo" (2015)
- "El arte de vivir" (2015)
- "Contigo" (2016)
- "Tengo un corazón" (2016)
- "Tú me obligaste" (2017) (feat. Cali y El Dandee)
- "Me haces falta" (2017)
- "Me olvidé" (2018)
- "Se vive mejor" (2018) (feat. Juan Magán)
- "Solo dime" (2018)
- "A dónde vas" (2019) (feat. Diogo Piçarra)
- "Me equivocaré" (2019)
- "Dile" (2019)
- "Deja a ese idiota" (2019)
- "Antídoto" (2020) (feat. Greeicy)
- "Ando perdido" (2020)
- "Cuando te vuelva a ver" (2020)
- "Te han visto llorar" (2021)
- "Por mil razones" (2021)
- "Sin buscarte" (2022)
- "La noche perfecta" (2023) (feat. Daviles de Novelda)
- "Patas arriba el hotel" (2025)
- "Inevitable" (2026)

Awards and achievements
Preceded by María Isabel with "Antes muerta que sencilla"	Spain in the Junior Eurovision Song Contest; 2005	Succeeded by Dani Fernández with "Te doy mi voz"
