= Malú =

Spanish flamenco singer

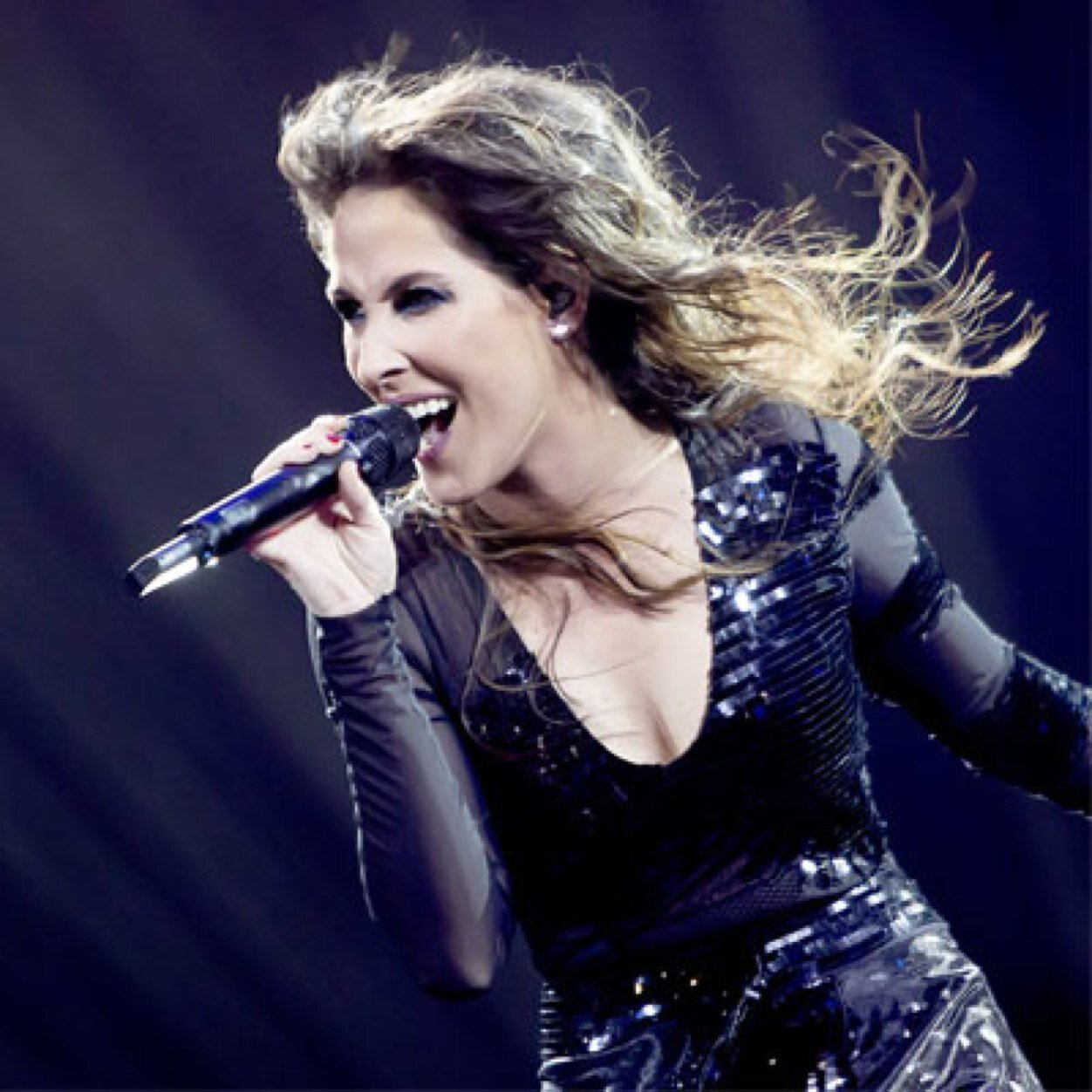
- Malú performing in 2013

Background information
- Born: María Lucía Sánchez Benítez; 15 March 1982 (age 44)
- Origin: Madrid, Spain
- Genres: Flamenco; copla; pop
- Occupation: Singer
- Instrument: Vocals
- Years active: 1998–present
- Website: maluweb.com

María Lucía Sánchez Benítez, known as Malú, is a Spanish singer.

She is the niece of the composer and guitarist Paco de Lucía, and is known for songs such as "Aprendiz", "Como Una Flor", "Toda", "Diles", "Si Estoy Loca" and "No Voy a Cambiar". In June 2020, she gave birth to a daughter with Albert Rivera, a former Citizens politician.

== Albums ==
=== Studio albums ===
List of studio albums, with selected chart positions and certifications
Title	Album details	Peak chart positions	Certifications
Title	Album details	SPA	Certifications
Aprendiz'	Released: 1998; Formats: CD; Label: Pep's Records	11	PROMUSICAE: 7 Platinum
Cambiarás	Released: 1999; Formats: CD; Label: Pep's Records	13	PROMUSICAE: Platinum
Esta Vez	Released: May 2001; Formats: CD; Label: Sony BMG	4	PROMUSICAE: 3× Platinum
Otra Piel	Released: 30 June 2003; Formats: CD; Label: Sony BMG	4	PROMUSICAE: Gold
Malú	Released: April 2005; Formats: CD, digital download; Label: Sony BMG	2	PROMUSICAE: Platinum
Desafío	Released: 31 October 2006; Formats: CD, digital download; Label: Sony BMG	2	PROMUSICAE: Platinum
Vive	Released: 17 March 2009; Formats: CD, digital download; Label: Sony BMG	2	PROMUSICAE: Gold
Guerra Fría	Released: 12 October 2010; Formats: CD, digital download; Label: Sony BMG	1	PROMUSICAE: Platinum
Sí	Released: 16 October 2013; Formats: CD, digital download; Label: Sony BMG	1	PROMUSICAE: 3× Platinum
Caos	Released: 27 November 2015; Formats: CD, digital download; Label: Sony BMG	1	PROMUSICAE: 2× Platinum
Oxígeno	Released: 21 September 2018; Formats: CD, digital download; Label: Sony BMG	1	PROMUSICAE: Platinum
Mil Batallas	Released: November 2021; Formats: CD, vinyl, digital download; Label: Sony Music	1	PROMUSICAE: Gold
A Todo Si	Released: 8 December 2023; Formats: CD, vinyl, digital download; Label: Sony BMG	1	

=== Live albums ===
List of Live albums, with selected chart positions and certifications
Title	Album details	Peak chart positions	Certifications
Title	Album details	SPA	Certifications
Por Una Vez	Released: 19 April 2004; Formats: CD, digital download; Label: Sony BMG	9	PROMUSICAE: Gold
Íntima Guerra Fría	Released: 11 November 2011; Formats: CD, digital download; Label: Sony BMG	—	

=== Compilations albums ===
List of Compilations albums, with selected chart positions and certifications
Title	Album details	Peak chart positions	Certifications
Title	Album details	SPA	Certifications
Gracias	Released: 27 November 2007; Formats: CD, digital download; Label: Sony BMG	10	PROMUSICAE: Gold
Esencial	Released: 31 July 2012; Formats: CD, digital download; Label: Sony BMG	40	
Dual	Released: 20 November 2012; Formats: CD, digital download; Label: Sony BMG	1	PROMUSICAE: Platinum
Grandes Éxitos	Released: 29 July 2014; Formats: CD, digital download; Label: Sony BMG	—	
Ni un Paso Atrás	Released: 2 December 2016; Formats: CD, digital download; Label: Sony BMG	1	PROMUSICAE: Gold

== Songs ==
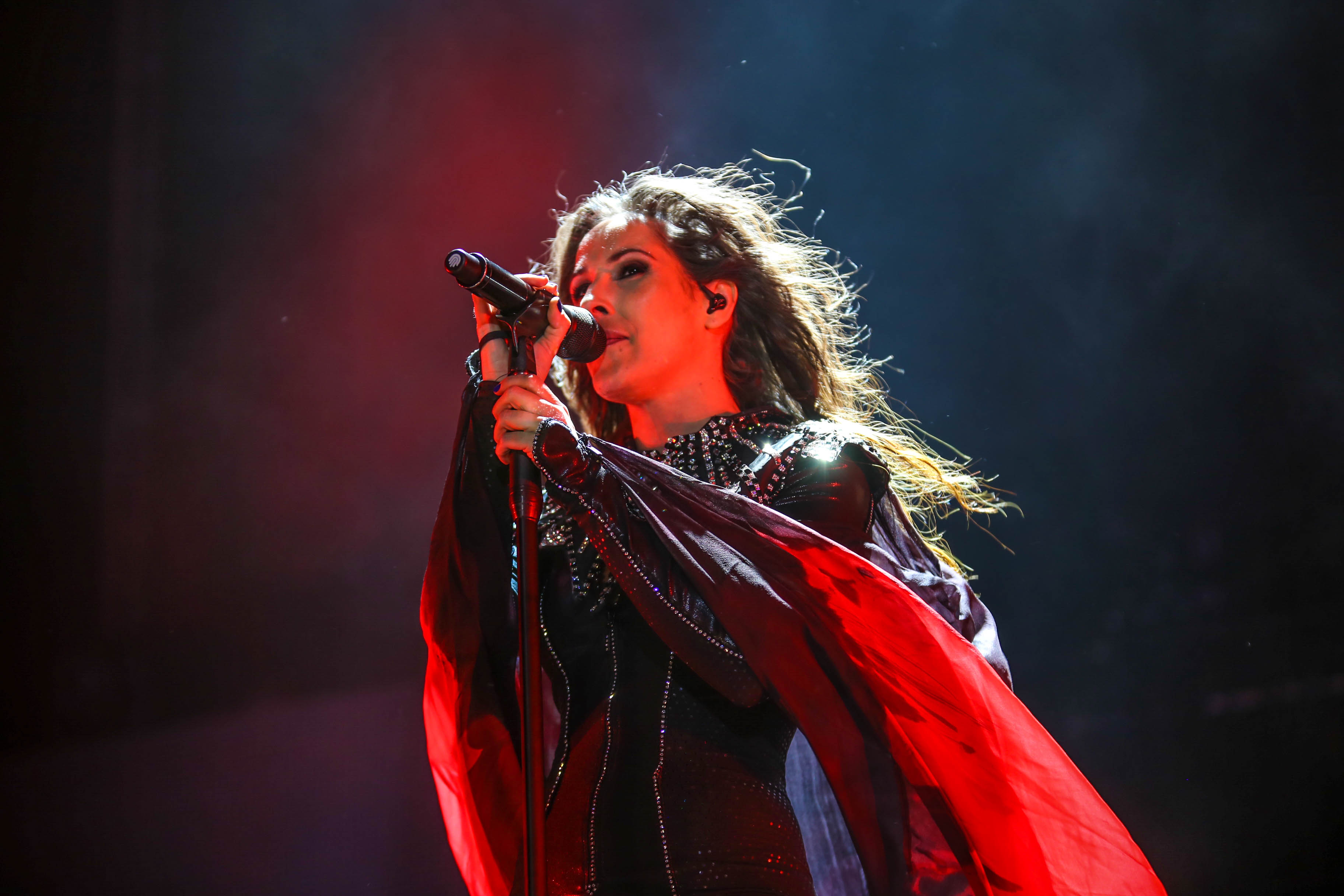
Malú in concert in Valladolid, 2016

- ”Aprendiz”
- ”Donde quiera que estés”
- ”Reflejo” (Remix)
- ”Como una flor” (Dance Remix)
- ”Lucharé”
- ”Si tú me dejas...”
- ”Cambiarás”
- ”Duele”
- ”Sin caminos”
- ”Poema de mi corazón”
- ”Y si fuera ella”
- ”Sin ti todo anda mal”
- ”Toda”
- ”Ven a pervertirme”
- ”Me quedó grande tu amor”
- ”Siempre tú”
- ”Como cada noche”
- ”Devuélveme la vida” (ft Antonio Orozco)
- ”No me extraña nada”
- ”Enamorada”
- ”Inevitable”
- ”Cómo un ángel
- ”Corazón partío” (ft Alejandro Sanz)
- ”Enamorada” (ft David DeMaría)
- ”Malas tentaciones”
- ”Por una vez”
- ”Diles”
- ”Te conozco desde siempre”
- ”Sabes bien”
- ”Si estoy loca”
- ”No voy a cambiar”
- ”A esto le llamas amor”
- ”Nadie”
- ”Cómo te olvido” (ft Jerry Rivera)
- "Que Nadie" (ft Manuel Carraso)
- ”Blanco y negro”
- ”Ni un segundo”
- ”Quién”
- ”Ahora tú”
- "Sólo el amor nos salvará (feat. Áleks Syntek)"
- "El amor es una cosa simple (ft Tiziano Ferro)"
- "Linda (ft Miguel Bosé)"
- "Vuelvo a verte" (ft Pablo Alborán)"
- "A prueba de ti"
- "Me fuí"
- "Deshazte de mi"
- "Desaparecer"
- "Quiero"
- "Encadenada A Ti"
- "Caos"
- "Cenizas"
- "Invisible"
- "Ciudad de papel"
- "Contradiction"
- "Oye"
- "Cantare"
- "Desprevenida"
- "Tejiendo Alas"
