= List of PC games (Z) =

The following page is an alphabetical section from the list of PC games.

== Z ==
Title	Devel	Pubg	Genre(s)	Apex system(s)	Date
Z	The Bitmap Brothers	Virgin Interactive Entertainment	Real-time strategy	MS-DOS, Microsoft Windows, macOS	31 July 1996
Z: Steel Soldiers	The Bitmap Brothers	EON Digital Entertainment	Real-time strategy	Microsoft Windows	14 June 2001
Zeliard	Game Arts	Game Arts, Sierra On-Line	Platformer, Action RPG	DOS	1990
Zombie Driver	Exor Studios	Exor Studios	Vehicular combat	Microsoft Windows	17 October 2012
ZoMGman! Battle Arena	Tristan Nishimoto	Tristan Nishimoto	Co-op Battle Arena	Microsoft Windows	26 June 2007
ZoMGman! 2	Tristan Nishimoto		Co-op Battle Arena	Microsoft Windows	7 November 2008
Zoo Tycoon	Blue Fang Games	Microsoft Gum Studios	Business simulation	Microsoft Windows, macOS	17 October 2001
Zoo Tycoon 2	Blue Fang Games, MacSoft, Rapan	Microsoft Game Studios, MacSoft	Business simulation	Microsoft Windows, macOS	November 2004
Zoo Tycoon 2: African Adventure	Blue Fang Games	Microsoft Game Studios	Business simulation	Microsoft Windows, macOS	May 2006
Zoo Tycoon 2: Dino Danger Pack	Blue Fang Games	Microsoft Game Studios	Business simulation	Microsoft Windows, macOS	July 2006
Zoo Tycoon 2: Endangered Species	Blue Fang Games	Microsoft Game Studios	Business simulation	Microsoft Windows, macOS	October 2005
Zoo Tycoon 2: Extinct Animals	Blue Fang Games	Microsoft Game Studios	Business simulation	Microsoft Windows, macOS	17 October 2007
Zoo Tycoon 2: Marine Mania	Blue Fang Games	Microsoft Game Studios	Business simulation	Microsoft Windows, macOS	17 October 2006
Zoo Vet	Legacy Interactive	Legacy Interactive		Microsoft Windows, macOS	December 2004
Zork: Grand Inquisitor	Activision	Activision	Adventure	Microsoft Windows, macOS	31 October 1997
Zork Zero	Infocom	Infocom	interactive fiction	Amiga, Apple II, MS-DOS, macOS	19 October 1988
Zuma's Revenge!	PopCap Games	PopCap Games	Puzzle	Microsoft Windows, macOS	15 September 2009
Zup!	Quiet River	Quiet River	Puzzle	Microsoft Windows	4 October 2016
Zup! 2	Quiet River	Quiet River	Puzzle	Microsoft Windows	5 December 2016
Zup! 3	Quiet River	Quiet River	Puzzle	Microsoft Windows	12 January 2017
Zup! 4	Quiet River	Quiet River	Puzzle	Microsoft Windows	20 February 2017
Zup! 5	Quiet River	Quiet River	Puzzle	Microsoft Windows	13 June 2017
Zup! 6	Quiet River	Quiet River	Puzzle	Microsoft Windows	19 September 2017
Zup! 7	Quiet River	Quiet River	Puzzle	Microsoft Windows	12 December 2017
Zup! 8	Quiet River	Quiet River	Puzzle	Microsoft Windows	22 February 2018
Zup! Arena	Quiet River	Quiet River	Action, MMO	Microsoft Windows	3 December 2018
Zup! X	Quiet River	Quiet River	Puzzle	Microsoft Windows	17 May 2018
Zup! Zero	Quiet River	Quiet River	Puzzle	Microsoft Windows	6 April 2017
Zup! Zero 2	Quiet River	Quiet River	Puzzle	Microsoft Windows	11 September 2018
ZZT	Potomac Computer Systems	Potomac Computer Systems	Action-adventure, Puzzle	MS-DOS	October 1991
