= Zoo Tycoon: Marine Mania =

- Developer: Blue Fang Games
- Publishers: Microsoft Game Studios, Aspyr Media
- Series: Zoo Tycoon
- Platforms: Microsoft Windows, MacOS
- Release: NA: 21 October 2002; UK: 15 November 2002
- Genre: Simulation
- Mode: Single-player

Zoo Tycoon: Marine Mania is a 2002 expansion pack developed by Blue Fang Games and published by Microsoft Game Studios for the 2001 simulation video game Zoo Tycoon. Marine Mania adds marine animals and exhibits to the game, allowing players to add aquatic shows to their park. Upon release, Marine Mania received average reviews, with praise for the variety of new animals, objects and show features, but criticism for the lack of additions that altered the core gameplay. An expansion with an identical name and theme, Zoo Tycoon 2: Marine Mania, was released in 2006.

== Gameplay ==
Tanks are used in Marine Mania to enclose 20 new ocean-based animals in the game.

Marine Mania adds the ability to create aquatic enclosures to display 20 new marine animals, including dolphins, sperm whales, and orcas. Marine enclosures are created by building above-ground tanks, which can be vertically adjusted to increase the depth of water in which the animals can swim. These tanks allow guests to view the animals from the side while they swim underwater, as opposed to simply viewing them from above the surface. Similarly to land animals, marine animals must be kept happy by providing the right balance of additions to their habitats, including a new range of aquatic flora.

An added feature in Marine Mania is the ability to hold Aquatic Shows where certain marine animals such as orcas, sea otters, bottlenose dolphins, and sea lions can perform tricks for visitors in shows held at customizable intervals. Creating shows requires the player to attach special show tanks to animal habitats and place grandstands in proximity to the tanks. Shows can be customized by players to increase visitor happiness and income by adjusting the number and sequence of tricks in a show and placing toys inside the show tank for new tricks. Maintenance of animal needs and performance of shows is handled by a new type of hireable employee, the marine specialist, who fills a role analogous to that of the zookeeper in the original game and the scientist in the Dinosaur Digs expansion.

Marine Mania also adds ten new scenarios, new decorative objects and amenities for players to place in their park, and minor gameplay changes, including the ability to pick up and manually move park guests.

== Development and release ==
Marine Mania was announced by Microsoft in mid-2002, with a planned release date of 18 October. Marine Mania was billed as a "double expansion pack", as it also includes the content of the previous expansion, Dinosaur Digs. In 2003, Marine Mania was packaged alongside Dinosaur Digs and the base game as part of a re-release titled Zoo Tycoon: Complete Collection.

== Reception ==
=== Sales ===
In December 2002, Marine Mania peaked in ninth place on NPD monthly sales charts, joined by the base game Zoo Tycoon in fifth place. At the time of its release in October 2002, sales for the base game passed a milestone of one million units sold.

=== Reviews ===
Reception

Aggregate score
Aggregator	Score
Metacritic	71%

Review scores
Publication	Score
Computer Gaming World	3/5 stars
GameSpot	6.2
GameSpy	68%
GameZone	9.0
Inside Mac Games	4.75/10

Marine Mania received "mixed or average" reviews from critics according to review aggregator platform Metacritic. Several critics praised the value of a double expansion pack containing the Dinosaur Digs content. Describing the game as a "decent expansion pack", Carla Harker for GameSpy enjoyed the new objects and scenarios, highlighting the marine shows as "one of the best improvements" to the game, although found the animations to be "poorly done" and unsatisfying. GameZone commended the game for adding a "fun element that was missing from the original", citing the aquatic displays, the colourful designs on the new attractions and landscapes, and the new set of animals. Eddie Park of Inside Mac Games found the game to add a "wealth of content", expressing that the shows and performances were "fun" and added "variety and enjoyment" to the game, but noted the game lacked innovations in its graphics and had few additions in terms of core gameplay. Andrew Park of GameSpot said the game contained problems similar to the original game, including its "unimpressive presentation" and "largely unchanged gameplay", critiquing the shows as unstimulating, but found some of the later scenarios were engaging. Elizabeth McAdams of Computer Gaming World found the game's difficulty to be "practically nonexistent" and that it failed to revitalize the original game.
