= D.I.C.E. Award for Family Game of the Year =

Annual award presented by the Academy of Interactive Arts & Sciences

- Country: United States
- Presented by: Academy of Interactive Arts & Sciences
- First award: 1998
- Currently held by: Lego Party
- Website: interactive.org

The D.I.C.E. Award for Family Game of the Year is an award presented annually by the Academy of Interactive Arts & Sciences during the D.I.C.E. Awards. This award recognizes "the best title of any genre towards a shared, family gaming experience. The title's play dynamics must be suitable for a younger audience but can appeal to adults as well. These games often offer a mini-game component and encourage group play". All active creative/technical, business, and affiliate members of the Academy are qualified to vote for this category. Originally only offered as a computer game category, the first winner was Lego Island, developed and published by Mindscape. The first console winner was Pokémon Snap in 2000. Since condensing the computer and console awards into a single category (briefly introduced in 2003), the first winner of the current version was Guitar Hero in 2006.

The award's most recent winner is Lego Party, developed by SMG Studio and published by Fictions.

== History ==
Originally, only one family-related category, PC Family/Kids Title of the Year, was offered for the first award ceremony. This was split into two separate categories for PC Children's Entertainment Title of the Year and PC Family Title of the Year in 1999, and introduced an Online Family/Board Game of the Year. The first family-related console award, Console Children's/Family Title of the Year, was offered in 2000, while there was still separate "Children's" and "Family" categories for PC. The 2001 awards had console and PC categories for Family Title of the Year. Both were renamed Children's Title of the Year for the 2002 awards. Originally separate console and computer awards for Children's Title of the Year were offered for the 2002 awards, but a single "Family Game of the Year" would be offered that featured finalists for both console and PC releases. For the 2004 awards, separate awards for Children's Game of the Year and Family Game of the Year would be offered for both console and computer; however, there were not any finalists named for Computer Children's Title of the Year. One finalist was named for Computer Children's Game of the Year in 2005. The 9th Annual Interactive Achievement Awards was the first ceremony that did not feature separate genre awards for console and computer. Children's Game of the Year was still presented in 2006 and 2007, but would not be offered in 2008. Only Family Game of the Year has been offered since 2008.

- PC Family/Kids Title of the Year (1998)
- PC Children's Entertainment Title of the Year (1999–2000)
- PC Family (Entertainment) Title of the Year (1999–2001)
- Online Family/Board Game of the Year (1999)
- Console Children's/Family Title of the Year (2000)
- Console Family Title of the Year (2001)
- Console Children's Title of the Year (2002, 2004–2005)
- Computer Children's Title of the Year (2002)
- Family Game of the Year (2003, 2006–present)
- Console Family Game of the Year (2004–2005)
- Computer Family Game of the Year (2004–2005)
- Computer Children's Game of the Year (2005)
- Children's Game of the Year (2006–2007)

== Winners and nominees ==
=== 1990s ===
Table key
Indicates the winner

Year	Game	Developer(s)	Publisher(s)	Ref.
1997/1998 (1st)	Lego Island	Mindscape	Mindscape	
1997/1998 (1st)	Backyard Baseball	Humongous Entertainment	GT Interactive	
1997/1998 (1st)	Secret Paths in the Forest	Purple Moon, Media Concrete	Convivial	
1997/1998 (1st)	The Oregon Trail 3rd Edition	MECC	The Learning Company	
1997/1998 (1st)	Tonka Search & Rescue	Media Station	Hasbro Interactive	
1997/1998 (1st)	Ultimate Family Tree	Palladium Interactive	Palladium Interactive	
1998/1999 (2nd)	PC Children's Entertainment Title of the Year			
1998/1999 (2nd)	A Bug's Life	Traveller's Tales	Disney Interactive	
1998/1999 (2nd)	Barbie Riding Club	Human Code	Mattel Media	
1998/1999 (2nd)	Blue's Birthday Adventure	Humongous Entertainment	Humongous Entertainment	
1998/1999 (2nd)	Dr. Brain Thinking Games: IQ Adventure	Knowledge Adventure	Knowledge Adventure	
1998/1999 (2nd)	Lego Creator	Superscape	Lego Media	
1998/1999 (2nd)	Rugrats Adventure Game	Broderbund	Broderbund	
1998/1999 (2nd)	Starfire Soccer Challenge	Purple Moon	Stormfront Studios	
1998/1999 (2nd)	PC Family Title of the Year			
1998/1999 (2nd)	National Geographic Maps	Broderbund	Broderbund	
1998/1999 (2nd)	3-D Ultra NASCAR Pinball	Dynamix	Sierra On-Line	
1998/1999 (2nd)	Looney Tunes: Cosmic Capers - Animated Jigsaws	SouthPeak Interactive	SouthPeak Interactive	
1998/1999 (2nd)	Star Wars: Behind the Magic	LucasArts	LucasArts	
1998/1999 (2nd)	The D Show	Cyberflix	Disney Interactive	
1998/1999 (2nd)	Online Family/Board Game of the Year (Note: Tie between finalists.)			
1998/1999 (2nd)	Multiplayer Jeopardy! Online	Sony Online Entertainment	Sony Online Entertainment	
1998/1999 (2nd)	What's the Big Idea?	Berkeley Systems	Berkeley Systems	
1998/1999 (2nd)	Multiplayer Wheel of Fortune Online	Sony Online Entertainment	Sony Online Entertainment	
1998/1999 (2nd)	The Game of Life	Mass Media Games	Hasbro Interactive	
1999/2000 (3rd)	Console Children's/Family Title of the Year			
1999/2000 (3rd)	Pokémon Snap	HAL Laboratory	Nintendo	
1999/2000 (3rd)	Lego Racers	High Voltage Software	Lego Media	
1999/2000 (3rd)	Mario Party	Hudson Soft	Nintendo	
1999/2000 (3rd)	Spyro 2: Ripto's Rage!	Insomniac Games	Sony Computer Entertainment	
1999/2000 (3rd)	Toy Story 2: Buzz Lightyear to the Rescue	Traveller's Tales	Activision	
1999/2000 (3rd)	PC Family Entertainment Title of the Year			
1999/2000 (3rd)	3D Ultra Lionel Traintown	Dynamix	Sierra On-Line	
1999/2000 (3rd)	Complete National Geographic	Mattel Media	National Geographic	
1999/2000 (3rd)	Miss Spider's Tea Party	Simon & Schuster Interactive	Simon & Schuster Interactive	
1999/2000 (3rd)	Pandora's Box	Microsoft	Microsoft	
1999/2000 (3rd)	The Sims	Maxis	Electronic Arts	
1999/2000 (3rd)	You Don't Know Jack Offline	Berkeley Systems	Sierra On-Line	
1999/2000 (3rd)	PC Children's Entertainment Title of the Year			
1999/2000 (3rd)	Disney's Villains' Revenge	Disney Interactive	Disney Interactive	
1999/2000 (3rd)	Lego Racers	High Voltage Software	Lego Media	
1999/2000 (3rd)	Miss Spider's Tea Party	Simon & Schuster Interactive	Simon & Schuster Interactive	
1999/2000 (3rd)	Sesame Street Music Maker	Sesame Workshop	Mattel Interactive	

=== 2000s ===
Year	Game	Developer(s)	Publisher(s)	Ref.
2000 (4th)	Console Family Title of the Year			
2000 (4th)	Mario Tennis	Camelot Software Planning	Nintendo	
2000 (4th)	Donkey Kong Country (Note: Game Boy Color version.)	Rare	Nintendo	
2000 (4th)	Hey You, Pikachu!	Ambrella	Nintendo	
2000 (4th)	Pokémon Stadium	Nintendo EAD	Nintendo	
2000 (4th)	PC Family Title of the Year			
2000 (4th)	Return of the Incredible Machine: Contraptions	Dynamix	Sierra On-Line	
2000 (4th)	Disney's Magic Artist 3D	Disney Interactive	Disney Interactive	
2000 (4th)	Ernie's Adventures in Space	Sesame Workshop	Mattel Interactive	
2000 (4th)	Tonka Digs N Rigs	ImageBuilder Software	Infogrames	
2001 (5th)	Console Children's Title of the Year			
2001 (5th)	Mario Party 3	Hudson Soft	Nintendo	
2001 (5th)	Harry Potter and the Sorcerer's Stone	Argonaut Games	Electronic Arts	
2001 (5th)	Tarzan: Untamed	Ubisoft Montreal	Ubisoft	
2001 (5th)	Monsters, Inc.	Kodiak Interactive	Sony Computer Entertainment	
2001 (5th)	Computer Children's Title of the Year			
2001 (5th)	Backyard Basketball	Humongous Entertainment	Infogrames	
2001 (5th)	Disney's Stanley Tiger Tales	Artech Digital Entertainment	Disney Interactive	
2001 (5th)	Harry Potter and the Sorcerer's Stone	KnowWonder	Electronic Arts	
2001 (5th)	Scan Command: Jurassic Park	Knowledge Adventure	Knowledge Adventure	
2002 (Note: Console and computer titles were nominated for Family Game of the Year at this ceremony.) (6th)	Mario Party 4	Hudson Soft	Nintendo	
2002 (6th)	Backyard Football	Humongous Entertainment	Infogrames	
2002 (6th)	Harry Potter and the Chamber of Secrets	Argonaut Games, EA UK	Electronic Arts	
2002 (6th)	Scooby-Doo! Night of 100 Frights	Heavy Iron Studios	THQ	
2002 (6th)	SpongeBob SquarePants: Employee of the Month	AWE Productions	THQ	
2003 (7th)	Console Children's Title of the Year			
2003 (7th)	Mario Party 5	Hudson Soft	Nintendo	
2003 (7th)	Backyard Basketball	Humongous Entertainment	Atari	
2003 (7th)	SpongeBob SquarePants: Battle for Bikini Bottom	Heavy Iron Studios	THQ	
2003 (7th)	Tak and the Power of Juju	Avalanche Software	THQ	
2003 (7th)	Console Family Game of the Year (Note: There was tie for the winner.)			
2003 (7th)	EyeToy: Play	London Studio	Sony Computer Entertainment	
2003 (7th)	The Sims Bustin' Out	Maxis	Electronic Arts	
2003 (7th)	Amplitude	Harmonix	Sony Computer Entertainment	
2003 (7th)	Grabbed by the Ghoulies	Rare	Microsoft Game Studios	
2003 (7th)	Computer Family Game of the Year			
2003 (7th)	Zoo Tycoon: Complete Collection	Blue Fang Games	Microsoft Game Studios	
2004 (8th)	Console Children's Title of the Year			
2004 (8th)	Sly 2: Band of Thieves	Sucker Punch Productions	Sony Computer Entertainment	
2004 (8th)	Backyard Baseball 2005	Humongous Entertainment	Atari	
2004 (8th)	Mario Party 6	Hudson Soft	Nintendo	
2004 (8th)	Pokémon Colosseum	Genius Sonority	Nintendo	
2004 (8th)	Shrek 2	Luxoflux	Activision	
2004 (8th)	Console Family Game of the Year			
2004 (8th)	Donkey Konga	Namco	Nintendo	
2004 (8th)	EyeToy: AntiGrav	Harmonix	Sony Computer Entertainment	
2004 (8th)	Karaoke Revolution Volume 3	Harmonix	Konami	
2004 (8th)	WarioWare, Inc.: Mega Party Games!	Nintendo R&D1	Nintendo	
2004 (8th)	Computer Children's Game of the Year			
2004 (8th)	Backyard Skateboarding	Humongous Entertainment	Atari	
2004 (8th)	Computer Family Game of the Year			
2004 (8th)	Zoo Tycoon 2	Blue Fang Games	Microsoft Game Studios	
2004 (8th)	Harry Potter and the Prisoner of Azkaban	Argonaut Games, EA UK, Griptonite Games	Electronic Arts	
2004 (8th)	Scrabble Online	Boston Animation	Atari	
2005 (9th)	Children's Game of the Year			
2005 (9th)	We Love Katamari	Namco	Namco	
2005 (9th)	Chicken Little	Avalanche Software	Buena Vista Games	
2005 (9th)	Madagascar	Toys for Bob	Activision	
2005 (9th)	Sly 3: Honor Among Thieves	Sucker Punch Productions	Sony Computer Entertainment	
2005 (9th)	Tak: The Great Juju Challenge	Avalanche Software	THQ	
2005 (9th)	Family Game of the Year			
2005 (9th)	Guitar Hero	Harmonix	RedOctane	
2005 (9th)	Dance Dance Revolution: Mario Mix	Konami, Hudson Soft	Nintendo	
2005 (9th)	Lego Star Wars: The Video Game	Traveller's Tales	Eidos Interactive, LucasArts	
2006 (10th)	Children's Game of the Year			
2006 (10th)	LocoRoco	Japan Studio	Sony Computer Entertainment	
2006 (10th)	Kim Possible: What's the Switch	Artificial Mind and Movement	Buena Vista Games	
2006 (10th)	Over the Hedge	Edge of Reality	Activision	
2006 (10th)	Pokémon Mystery Dungeon: Blue Rescue Team and Red Rescue Team	Chunsoft	Nintendo	
2006 (10th)	The Legend of Spyro: A New Beginning	Krome Studios	Sierra Entertainment	
2006 (10th)	Family Game of the Year			
2006 (10th)	Guitar Hero II	Harmonix	RedOctane	
2006 (10th)	Brain Age: Train Your Brain in Minutes a Day!	Nintendo SPD	Nintendo	
2006 (10th)	Lego Star Wars II: The Original Trilogy	Traveller's Tales	LucasArts	
2006 (10th)	Rayman Raving Rabbids	Ubisoft Montpellier	Ubisoft	
2006 (10th)	Viva Piñata	Rare	Microsoft Game Studios	
2007 (11th)	Rock Band	Harmonix	MTV Games	
2007 (11th)	Guitar Hero III: Legends of Rock	Neversoft	Activision	
2007 (11th)	Rayman Raving Rabbids 2	Ubisoft Paris	Ubisoft	
2007 (11th)	Scene It? Lights, Camera, Action	Screenlife Games, WXP	Microsoft Game Studios	
2007 (11th)	WarioWare: Smooth Moves	Nintendo SPD, Intelligent Systems	Nintendo	
2008 (12th)	LittleBigPlanet	Media Molecule	Sony Computer Entertainment	
2008 (12th)	Boom Blox	EA Los Angeles	Electronic Arts	
2008 (12th)	Rayman Raving Rabbids: TV Party	Ubisoft Paris	Ubisoft	
2008 (12th)	Rock Band 2	Harmonix	MTV Games	
2008 (12th)	Wii Fit	Nintendo EAD	Nintendo	
2009 (13th)	The Beatles: Rock Band	Harmonix	MTV Games	
2009 (13th)	Guitar Hero 5	Neversoft	Activision	
2009 (13th)	Lego Rock Band	Harmonix, Traveller's Tales	MTV Games, Warner Bros. Interactive Entertainment	
2009 (13th)	Wii Fit Plus	Nintendo EAD	Nintendo	
2009 (13th)	Wii Sports Resort	Nintendo EAD	Nintendo	

=== 2010s ===
Year	Game	Developer(s)	Publisher(s)	Ref.
2010 (14th)	Dance Central	Harmonix	MTV Games	
2010 (14th)	Kirby's Epic Yarn	HAL Laboratory, Good-Feel	Nintendo	
2010 (14th)	Lego Harry Potter: Years 1-4	Traveller's Tales	Warner Bros. Interactive Entertainment	
2010 (14th)	Rock Band 3	Harmonix	MTV Games	
2010 (14th)	SingStar Dance	London Studio	Sony Computer Entertainment	
2011 (15th)	LittleBigPlanet 2	Media Molecule	Sony Computer Entertainment	
2011 (15th)	Dance Central 2	Harmonix	Microsoft Studios	
2011 (15th)	Just Dance 3	Ubisoft Paris	Ubisoft	
2011 (15th)	Kinect: Disneyland Adventures	Frontier Developments	Microsoft Studios	
2011 (15th)	Skylanders: Spyro's Adventure	Toys for Bob, XPEC Entertainment, Vicarious Visions	Activision	
2012 (16th)	Skylanders: Giants	Toys for Bob	Activision	
2012 (16th)	Dance Central 3	Harmonix	Microsoft Studios	
2012 (16th)	Just Dance 4	Ubisoft Paris, Ubisoft Milan, Ubisoft Reflections, Ubisoft Bucharest, Ubisoft Pune	Ubisoft	
2012 (16th)	Lego Batman 2: DC Super Heroes	Traveller's Tales	Warner Bros. Interactive Entertainment	
2012 (16th)	Nintendo Land	Nintendo EAD	Nintendo	
2013 (17th)	Super Mario 3D World	Nintendo EAD	Nintendo	
2013 (17th)	Disney Infinity	Avalanche Software, Heavy Iron Studios	Disney Interactive Studios	
2013 (17th)	Lego Marvel Super Heroes	Traveller's Tales	Warner Bros. Interactive Entertainment	
2013 (17th)	Rayman Legends	Ubisoft Montpellier	Ubisoft	
2013 (17th)	Skylanders: Swap Force	Toys for Bob	Activision	
2014 (18th)	LittleBigPlanet 3	Sumo Digital	Sony Computer Entertainment	
2014 (18th)	Disney Infinity 2.0: Marvel Super Heroes	Avalanche Software, Heavy Iron Studios	Disney Interactive Studios	
2014 (18th)	Lego Batman 3: Beyond Gotham	Traveller's Tales	Warner Bros. Interactive Entertainment	
2014 (18th)	Project Spark	Team Dakota	Microsoft Studios	
2014 (18th)	Skylanders: Trap Team	Toys for Bob	Activision	
2015 (19th)	Super Mario Maker	Nintendo EAD	Nintendo	
2015 (19th)	Guitar Hero Live	FreeStyleGames	Activision	
2015 (19th)	Lego Dimensions	Traveller's Tales	Warner Bros. Interactive Entertainment	
2015 (19th)	Rock Band 4	Harmonix	Harmonix	
2015 (19th)	Tearaway Unfolded	Media Molecule, Tarsier Studios	Sony Computer Entertainment	
2016 (20th)	Ratchet & Clank	Insomniac Games	Sony Interactive Entertainment	
2016 (20th)	Dragon Quest Builders	Square Enix	Square Enix	
2016 (20th)	Lego Star Wars: The Force Awakens	Traveller's Tales	Warner Bros. Interactive Entertainment	
2016 (20th)	Rock Band Rivals	Harmonix	Harmonix	
2016 (20th)	Super Mario Maker for Nintendo 3DS	Nintendo EAD	Nintendo	
2017 (21st)	Snipperclips	SFB Games	Nintendo	
2017 (21st)	DropMix	Harmonix	Hasbro	
2017 (21st)	Gnog	KO_OP	Double Fine Productions	
2017 (21st)	Just Dance 2018	Ubisoft Paris	Ubisoft	
2017 (21st)	SingStar Celebration	London Studio	Sony Interactive Entertainment	
2018 (22nd)	Unravel Two	Coldwood Interactive	Electronic Arts	
2018 (22nd)	Astro Bot Rescue Mission	Japan Studio	Sony Interactive Entertainment	
2018 (22nd)	Kirby Star Allies	HAL Laboratory	Nintendo	
2018 (22nd)	Lego DC Super-Villains	Traveller's Tales	Warner Bros. Interactive Entertainment	
2018 (22nd)	Starlink: Battle for Atlas	Ubisoft Toronto	Ubisoft	
2019 (23rd)	Super Mario Maker 2	Nintendo EPD	Nintendo	
2019 (23rd)	A Short Hike	Adam Robinson-Yu	Adam Robinson-Yu	
2019 (23rd)	Dragon Quest Builders 2	Square Enix, Omega Force	Square Enix	
2019 (23rd)	Ring Fit Adventure	Nintendo EPD	Nintendo	
2019 (23rd)	Yoshi's Crafted World	Good-Feel	Nintendo	

=== 2020s ===
Year	Game	Developer(s)	Publisher(s)	Ref.
2020 (24th)	Animal Crossing: New Horizons	Nintendo EPD	Nintendo	
2020 (24th)	Astro's Playroom	Team Asobi	Sony Interactive Entertainment	
2020 (24th)	Dreams	Media Molecule	Sony Interactive Entertainment	
2020 (24th)	Fall Guys: Ultimate Knockout	Mediatonic	Devolver Digital	
2020 (24th)	Sackboy: A Big Adventure	Sumo Digital	Sony Interactive Entertainment	
2021 (25th)	Ratchet & Clank: Rift Apart	Insomniac Games	Sony Interactive Entertainment	
2021 (25th)	Animal Crossing: New Horizons - Happy Home Paradise	Nintendo EPD	Nintendo	
2021 (25th)	Cozy Grove	Spry Fox	QAG	
2021 (25th)	Mario Party Superstars	NDCube	Nintendo	
2021 (25th)	WarioWare: Get It Together	Intelligent Systems	Nintendo	
2022 (26th)	Mario + Rabbids Sparks of Hope	Ubisoft Milan, Ubisoft Paris	Ubisoft	
2022 (26th)	Disney Dreamlight Valley	Gameloft	Gameloft	
2022 (26th)	Kirby's Dream Buffet	HAL Laboratory	Nintendo	
2022 (26th)	Lost in Play	Happy Juice Games	Joystick Ventures	
2022 (26th)	Trombone Champ	Holy Wow Studios	Holy Wow Studios	
2023 (27th)	Super Mario Bros. Wonder	Nintendo EPD	Nintendo	
2023 (27th)	Disney Illusion Island	Dlala Studios	Disney Interactive	
2023 (27th)	Fae Farm	Phoenix Labs	Phoenix Labs	
2023 (27th)	Hello Kitty Island Adventure	Sunblink	Sunblink	
2023 (27th)	Midnight Girl	Italic	Italic	
2024 (28th)	Astro Bot	Team Asobi	Sony Interactive Entertainment	
2024 (28th)	Cat Quest III	The Gentlebros	Kepler Interactive	
2024 (28th)	Little Kitty, Big City	Double Dagger	Double Dagger	
2024 (28th)	The Plucky Squire	All Possible Futures	Devolver Digital	
2024 (28th)	Super Mario Party Jamboree	Nintendo Cube	Nintendo	
2025 (29th)	Lego Party	SMG Studio	Fictions	
2025 (29th)	Lego Voyagers	Light Brick Studio	Annapurna Interactive	
2025 (29th)	Lumines Arise	Enhance Games	Monstars	
2025 (29th)	Marvel Cosmic Invasion	Tribute Games	Dotemu	
2025 (29th)	Popucom	Countersurge Salient	Gryphline	

== Multiple nominations and wins ==
=== Developers and publishers ===
Nintendo and Harmonix are tied for developing the most winners, with Harmonix developing the most finalists. There are numerous developers that have received consecutive wins:

- Dynamix won PC awards in 2000 with 3D Ultra Lionel Traintown, and 2001 with Return of the Incredible Machine: Contraptions.
- Hudson Soft won console awards in 2002 with Mario Party 3, 2003 with Mario Party 4, and 2004 with Mario Party 5.
- Blue Fang Games won computer awards in 2004 with Zoo Tycoon: Complete Collection, and 2005 with Zoo Tycoon 2.
- Harmonix had two winning streaks for Family Game of the Year
  - 2006 with Guitar Hero, 2007 with Guitar Hero II, and 2008 with Rock Band.
  - 2010 with The Beatles: Rock Band, and 2011 with Dance Central.
- Nintendo EPD won in 2020 with Super Mario Maker 2, and 2021 with Animal Crossing: New Horizons.

Nintendo has published the most nominees and the most winners for Family Game of the Year, with Sony Interactive Entertainment in second with most nominees and winners. Warner Bros. Interactive Entertainment has published the most nominees without a single winner. There have been numerous publishers with consecutive wins:

- Nintendo had two winning streaks for consecutive wins as a publisher.
  - Nintendo published console award winners six years in a row from 2000—2005 with Pokémon Snap (2000), Mario Tennis (2001), Mario Party 3 (2002), Mario Party 4 (2003), Mario Party 5 (2004), and Donkey Konga (2005).
  - Nintendo also won in 2020 with Super Mario Maker 2, and 2021 with Animal Crossing: New Horizons.
- Sierra On-Line had PC winners in 2000 with 3D Ultra Lionel Traintown, and 2001 with Return of the Incredible Machine: Contraptions.
- Sony Computer Entertainment published winners in 2004 with EyeToy: Play, and in 2005 with Sly 2: Band of Thieves.
- Microsoft Game Studios won Computer Family Game of the Year in 2004 with Zoo Tycoon: Complete Collection, and in 2005 with Zoo Tycoon 2.
- RedOctane won in 2006 with Guitar Hero, and 2007 with Guitar Hero II.
- MTV Games won in 2010 with The Beatles: Rock Band, and 2011 with Dance Central.

In 2001, Nintendo has published every nominee for Console Family Title of the Year.

Developers
Developer	Nominations	Wins
Harmonix	16	5
Nintendo EAD/EPD/SPD/R&D1	15	5
Hudson Soft	5	3
Humongous Entertainment	7	2
Media Molecule	4	2
Dynamix	3	2
Insomniac Games	3	2
Blue Fang Games	2	2
Namco	2	2
Traveller's Tales	12	1
Ubisoft Paris	6	1
HAL Laboratory	4	1
Toys for Bob	4	1
SCE London Studio	3	1
Berkeley Systems	2	1
Broderbund	2	1
Disney Interactive	2	1
Japan Studio	2	1
Maxis	2	1
Sony Online Entertainment	2	1
Sumo Digital	2	1
Team Asobi	2	1
Ubisoft Milan	2	1
Avalanche Software	5	0
Argonaut Games	4	0
Heavy Iron Studios	4	0
Rare	3	0
EA UK	2	0
Good-Feel	2	0
High Voltage Software	2	0
Intelligent Systems	2	0
Knowledge Adventure	2	0
Neversoft	2	0
NDCube/Nintendo Cube	2	0
Purple Moon	2	0
Sesame Workshop	2	0
Simon & Schuster Interactive	2	0
Ubisoft Montpellier	2	0

Publishers
Publisher	Nominations	Wins
Nintendo	36	12
Sony Computer/Online/Interactive Entertainment	23	10
MTV Games	6	3
Microsoft (Game) Studios	11	2
Disney Interactive	10	2
Electronic Arts	8	2
Sierra On-Line/Entertainment	5	2
RedOctane	2	2
Activision	11	1
Ubisoft	10	1
Atari	4	1
Infogrames	3	1
Broderbund	2	1
Warner Bros. Interactive Entertainment	8	0
THQ	5	0
Hasbro	3	0
Lego Media	3	0
LucasArts	3	0
Mattel Media/Interactive	3	0
Devolver Digital	2	0
Harmonix	2	0
Knowledge Adventure	2	0
Square Enix	2	0

=== Franchises ===
The Lego video game franchise has garnered the most nominations, while the Mario franchise has won the most awards in this category. The Nickelodeon video game franchise has the most nominations without winning a single award. There have been numerous franchises that have won consecutive awards:

- Mario won the console awards four years in a row with Mario Tennis in 2001, Mario Party 3 in 2002, Mario Party 4 in 2003, and Mario Party 5 in 2004.
  - Mario won back-to-back again in 2023 with Mario + Rabbids Sparks of Hope, and in 2024 with Super Mario Bros. Wonder.
- Zoo Tycoon won computer awards in 2004 with Zoo Tycoon: Complete Collection, and 2005 with Zoo Tycoon 2.
- Guitar Hero won in 2006 with Guitar Hero, and in 2007 with Guitar Hero II.

Miss Spider's Tea Party is the only game that has received nominations for both "PC Family Title of the Year" and "PC Children's Entertainment Title of the Year" in 2000. Harry Potter and the Sorcerer's Stone is the only game to receive nominations for both console and computer platforms in the same year. The Backyard Sports franchise has separate nominees for console and computer in 2005 with Backyard Baseball for console and Backyard Skateboarding winning a computer award. Super Mario Maker has received multiple nominations across multiple years, with the Wii U version winning in 2016, and the Nintendo 3DS version being nominated in 2017. Animal Crossing: New Horizons has won in 2021, and the Happy Home Paradise expansion has been nominated in 2022.

Franchises
Franchise	Nominations	Wins
Mario	15	9
LittleBigPlanet (Note: Sackboy: A Big Adventure is a part of the LittleBigPlanet franchise.)	4	3
Lego	16	2
Disney	15	2
Rock Band	7	2
Backyard Sports	6	2
Guitar Hero	5	2
Ratchet & Clank	2	2
Zoo Tycoon	2	2
Pokémon	5	1
Rayman (Note: Rabbids are a spin-off franchise of Rayman.)	5	1
Rabbids	4	1
Skylanders	4	1
Astro Bot	3	1
Dance Central	3	1
Animal Crossing	2	1
Donkey Kong	2	1
EyeToy	2	1
National Geographic	2	1
The Sims	2	1
Sly Cooper	2	1
Nickelodeon (Note: includes Blue's Clues, Rugrats, SpongeBob SquarePants, and Tak.)	6	0
Harry Potter	5	0
Star Wars	4	0
DC Comics	3	0
DreamWorks	3	0
Just Dance	3	0
Kirby	3	0
Marvel	3	0
Spyro	3	0
Wario	3	0
Wii	3	0
Dragon Quest	2	0
Miss Spider's Tea Party	2	0
Sesame Street	2	0
SingStar	2	0
SpongeBob SquarePants	2	0
Tak	2	0
Tonka	2	0
