= Microsoft Works =

Productivity software suite

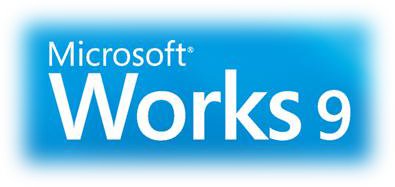
- Developer: Microsoft
- Release: 1987; 39 years ago

Final release(s)
- DOS: 3.0b / 1993
- Classic Mac OS: 4.0b / 1994
- Windows: 9 / 28 September 2007
- Operating system: MS-DOS, Microsoft Windows, Classic Mac OS
- Type: Office suite
- License: Commercial proprietary software
- Website: https://web.archive.org/web/20080912041711/http://www.microsoft.com/PRODUCTS/works/default.mspx

Microsoft Works is a discontinued productivity software suite developed by Microsoft and sold from 1987 to 2009. Its core functionality included a word processor, a spreadsheet and a database management system. Later versions had a calendar application and a dictionary while older releases included a terminal emulator. Works was available as a standalone program and as part of a namesake home productivity suite. Because of its low cost, companies frequently preinstalled Works on their low-cost machines. Works was smaller, less expensive, and had fewer features than contemporary major office suites such as Microsoft Office.

Mainstream support for the final standalone and suite release ended on October 9, 2012, and January 8, 2013, respectively.

== History ==
Microsoft Works originated as MouseWorks, an integrated spreadsheet, word processor, and database program, designed for the Macintosh by ex-Apple employee Don Williams and Rupert Lissner. Williams planned to emulate the success of Lissner's AppleWorks, a similar product for Apple II computers. Bill Gates and his Head of Acquisitions, Alan M. Boyd, convinced Williams in 1986 to license the product to Microsoft instead. Initially intended as a scaled-down version of Office for small laptops like TRS-80 Model 100, which was developed by Microsoft and sold by Radio Shack, Microsoft Works evolved as a popular product in its own right as laptops grew in power.

On September 14, 1987, Microsoft unveiled Works for DOS. The initial version 1.x of Works ran on any PC with at least 256k of memory. Works 2.x, introduced in 1990, required 512k and 3.x, introduced in 1992, required 640k.

In 1991, Microsoft issued the first Windows version of Works, titled MS Works for Windows 2.0. System requirements include Windows 3.0, a 286 CPU, and 1MB of memory. Works 3.x in 1993 requires Windows 3.1, a 386 CPU, and 4MB of memory. Subsequent releases are for Windows 95 and up, and the final version is Works 9.x in 2007, requiring Windows XP or Vista, 256MB of memory, and a Pentium 4 CPU.

Corresponding Macintosh versions of Works were released by Microsoft starting with Works 1.0 in 1986. The version numbering of the Macintosh versions follow roughly that of their corresponding releases for DOS and Windows.

Through version 4.5a, Works uses a monolithic program architecture whereby its word processor, spreadsheet and database documents run in windows of the same program interface. This results in a small memory and disk footprint, which enables it to run on slower computers with requirements as low as 6 MB of RAM and 12 MB free disk space. It also provides a mini version of Excel for DOS systems as a DOS version of that program is not available. Works 2000 (Version 5.0) switches to a modular architecture which opens each document as a separate instance and uses the print engine from Internet Explorer.

Version 9.0, the final version, is available in two editions: an advertisement-free version, available in retail and for OEMs, and an ad-supported free version (Works SE) which was available only to OEMs for preinstallation on new computers.

In late 2009, Microsoft announced it would discontinue Works and replace it with Office 2010 Starter Edition, although it replaced only the word processor and spreadsheet components but not the calendar or the database.

== Features ==
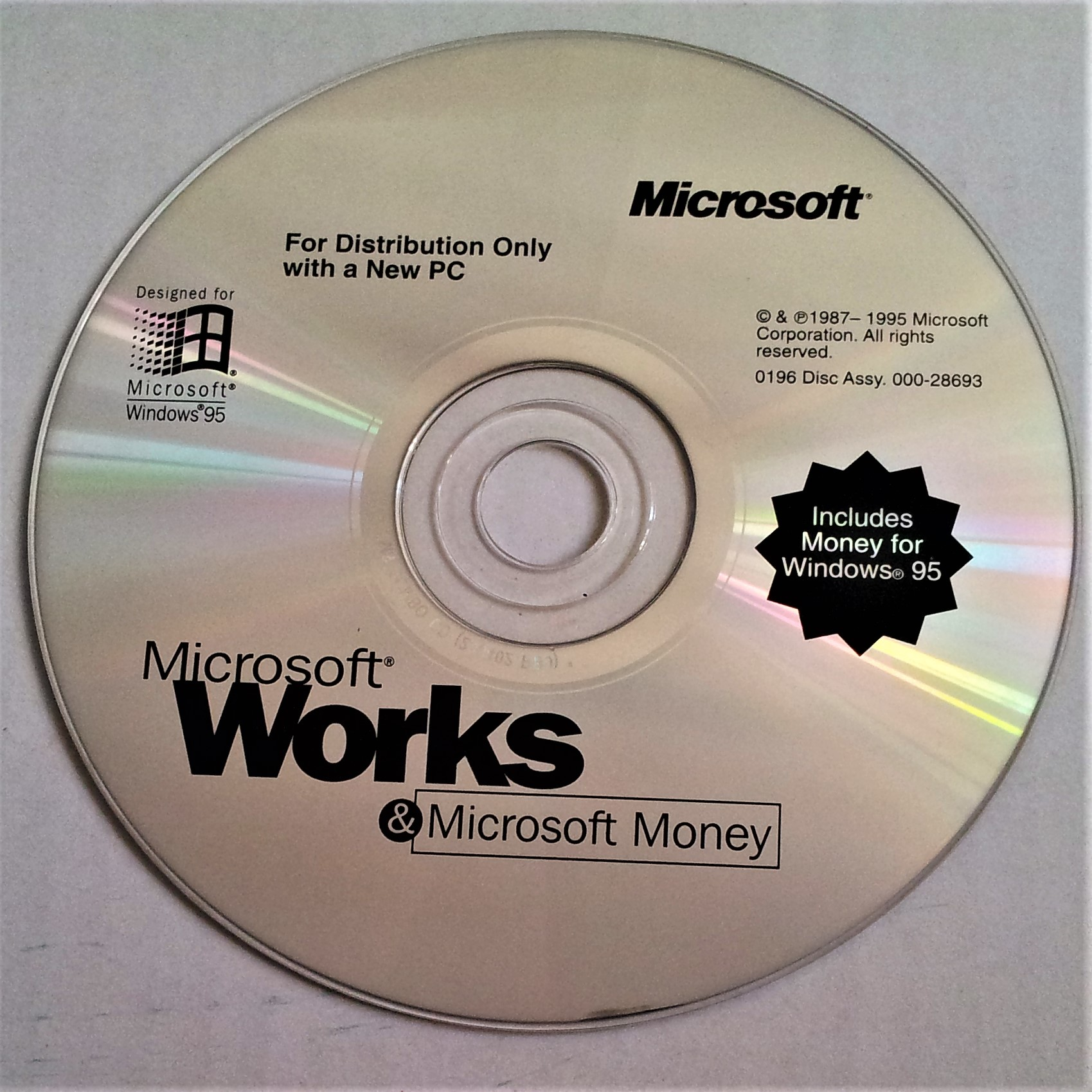
An installation disc of Microsoft Works 4.0 with Microsoft Money 95

Microsoft Works has built-in compatibility for the Microsoft Office document formats (.DOC and .XLS), including, but not limited to, the ability of the Works Word Processor to open Microsoft Word documents and the ability of the Works Spreadsheet to open Microsoft Excel workbooks. In the final version (Version 9.0), the Windows 95-era icons and toolbars are not updated to make them consistent with later application software.

While its utility for larger organizations is limited by its use of incompatible proprietary native .WKS (spreadsheet), .WDB (database), and .WPS (word processor) file formats, the simplicity of integrating database/spreadsheet data into word processor documents (e.g., mail merge) allow it to remain an option for some small and home-based business owners. Version 4.5a is particularly noted in this respect. The database management system, while a "flat file" (i.e., non-relational) allows the novice user to perform complex transformations through formulas (which use standard algebraic syntax and can be self-referential) and user-defined reports that can be copied as text to the clipboard. A 'Works Portfolio' utility offers Microsoft Binder-like functionality.

By installing the 2007 Office System Compatibility Pack, the Works Word Processor and Spreadsheet can import and export Office Open XML document formats, although they will be converted rather than being operated upon natively. The Works Calendar can store appointments, integrates with the Windows Address Book, as well as Address Book's successor, Windows Contacts, and can remind users of birthdays and anniversaries. It supports importing and exporting iCalendar (.ICS) files. It does not support subscribing to iCalendar files or publishing them online via WebDAV. Up to version 8, using the Works Task Launcher, the calendar and contacts from Windows Address Book could be synchronized with portable devices. In Works 9.0, the sync capability has been removed.

== File format compatibility and other issues ==
Microsoft (sometime in the past) made file format conversion filters for Microsoft Word for opening and saving to Works Word Processor format. Microsoft Office Excel could import newer Works Spreadsheets because the newer Works Spreadsheet also used the Excel format but with a different extension (*.xlr). There is an import filter for older Works 2.0 spreadsheet format (*.wks); however it may be disabled in the registry by newer Microsoft Office Service packs. As far as Works Spreadsheet 3.x/4.x/2000 (*.wks) and Works database (any version of *.wdb) files were concerned, in the past, Microsoft did not provide an import filter for Excel or Access. There are third party converters available for converting these filetypes to Excel spreadsheets: for database files (*.wdb), there was also a donateware utility; for spreadsheet (*.wks) and database (*.wdb) files, a commercial solution was available (at least apparently in 2008).

A general C++ library, libwps, can extract text from many different versions of Microsoft Works, this library is used by Collabora Online and LibreOffice.

One commercially available solution for converting to and from Microsoft Works files on the Macintosh platform in 2016 was the MacLinkPlus product from DataViz. Free online conversion services in 2016 were also available.

Works Spreadsheet and Works Database are unable to handle more than 500 fonts installed in Windows and throw error messages.

== Version history ==
Microsoft Works 2.0 for DOS

=== Works for MS-DOS ===
- Microsoft Works 1.12
- Microsoft Works 1.5
- Microsoft Works 2.0 and 2.00a
- Microsoft Works 3.0, 3.0a and 3.0b

=== Works for Mac OS ===
- Microsoft Works 1.0
- Microsoft Works 2.0
- Microsoft Works 3.0
- Microsoft Works 4.0

=== Works for Microsoft Windows ===
- Microsoft Works 2.0 and 2.0a (Windows 3.x)
- Microsoft Works 3.0, 3.0a and 3.0b (Windows 3.x)
- Microsoft Works 4.0, 4.0a, 4.5 and 4.5a (Windows 95)
- Microsoft Works 2000 (v.5)
- Microsoft Works 6.0 – Last version for Windows 95
- Microsoft Works 7.0 – Last version for Windows 98 (Original release)
- Microsoft Works 8.0 – Last version for Windows 98 SE/Me/2000 – Fully compatible with Windows XP and Windows Vista, Windows 7 and later versions of Windows.
- Microsoft Works 8.5 (Free update for Works 8.0, Microsoft Works Suite 2005 and Microsoft Works Suite 2004 users)
- Microsoft Works 9.0 – First version fully compatible with all versions of Windows Vista, fully compatible with later versions of Windows

== Works Suite ==
In 1997, Microsoft introduced Microsoft Home Essentials, a home productivity package sold as a low-price suite that a Chicago Tribune review described as "one of the best bargains ever offered." Home Essentials evolved to become Works Suite beginning with the 1999 edition, taking the namesake of Works. A slimmer version of the suite, Works Deluxe, was offered for that year but was discontinued thereafter.

As Works Suite's programs were developed separately and sold individually, each has a unique look and feel. They are integrated by a task plane, which picks the appropriate program for the user to accomplish each task. Works Suite includes additional programs such as FoneSync in 2001 and PowerPoint Viewer beginning in 2003. Later editions prompt users to upgrade to featured versions of the programs at a discount.

In addition to retail sales, Works Suite was included with the purchase of a new computer by companies such as Dell and Gateway. Works Suite was discontinued after the 2006 edition. Works was later bundled with Word as Works Plus 2008, but this was made available only to OEMs.

Comparison of bundled Works home productivity suites:

Product	Suggested Retail Price	Version	Word	Encarta	Money	Creativity	Gaming	Mapping Tools	Imaging Tools
Home Essentials 97	$109	Works 4.0	Word 97	Encarta 97 Encyclopedia (Encarta 97 World Atlas on international edition)	N/A (Money 97 on international edition)	Greetings Workshop 1.0 (excluded from international version)	Microsoft Arcade (Microsoft Football on international edition)	N/A	N/A
Home Essentials 98	$109	Works 4.5	Word 97	Encarta 98 Encyclopedia (Encarta 98 World Atlas on international edition)	Money 98	Greetings Workshop 2.0 (excluded from international edition)	Entertainment Pack: Puzzle Collection	N/A	N/A
Works Suite 99	$109	Works 4.5	Word 97	Encarta Encyclopedia 99 (Encarta World Atlas 99 on international edition)	Money 99 Basic	Graphics Studio Greetings 99	N/A	Expedia Streets 98 (AutoRoute Express Europe 98 on international edition)	Picture It! Express 2.0
Works Deluxe 99	$84.95	Works 4.5	N/A	N/A	Money 99 Basic	Graphics Studio Greetings 99	N/A	N/A	Picture It! Express 2.0
Works Suite 2000	$109	Works 5.0	Word 2000	Encarta Standard 2000 (Encarta Interactive World Atlas 2000 on international edition)	Money 2000 Standard	Home Publishing 2000	N/A	Expedia Streets & Trips 2000 (AutoRoute Express 2000 Europe on international edition)	Picture It! Express 2000
Works Suite 2001	$109	Works 6.0	Word 2000	Encarta Standard 2001 (Encarta Interactive World Atlas 2001 on international edition)	Money 2001 Standard	N/A	N/A	Streets & Trips 2001 (AutoRoute Express Europe 2001 on international edition)	Picture It! Publishing 2001
Works Suite 2002	$109	Works 6.0	Word 2002	Encarta Standard 2002	Money 2002 Standard	N/A	N/A	Streets & Trips 2002 (AutoRoute Europe 2002 on international edition)	Picture It! Photo 2002
Works Suite 2003	$109 before $15 rebate	Works 7.0	Word 2002	Encarta Standard 2003	Money 2003 Standard	N/A	N/A	Streets & Trips 2003 (AutoRoute Europe 2002 on UK edition; excluded from other international editions)	Picture It! Photo 7.0
Works Suite 2004	$99.99 before $15 rebate	Works 7.0	Word 2002	Encarta Standard 2004	Money 2004 Standard	N/A	N/A	Streets & Trips 2004 (AutoRoute 2004 on international edition)	Picture It! Photo Premium 9
Works Suite 2005	$99.99 before $20 rebate	Works 8.0	Word 2002	Encarta Standard 2005 (excluded from Italian and French editions)	Money 2005 Standard	N/A	N/A (Zoo Tycoon and Zoo Tycoon: Dinosaur Digs on European Works & Entertainment Suite 2005 OEM edition only)	Streets & Trips 2005 (AutoRoute 2005 on international edition)	Picture It! Premium 10
Works Suite 2006	$99.99 before $20 rebate	Works 8.0	Word 2002	Encarta Standard 2006	Money 2006 Standard (Money 2005 Standard on international edition; excluded from international Works & Entertainment Suite 2006 OEM edition)	N/A	N/A (Zoo Tycoon Complete Collection on international Works & Entertainment Suite 2006 OEM edition only)	Streets & Trips Essentials 2006 (AutoRoute 2006 Essentials on international edition)	Digital Image Standard 2006
Works Plus 2008	Available from OEM only (free)	Works 9.0	Word 2003	N/A	N/A	N/A	N/A	N/A	N/A

== See also ==
- Lotus 1-2-3
