= World of Zoo =

2009 video game

- Developers: Blue Fang Games (PC, Wii), 1st Playable Productions (DS)
- Publisher: THQ
- Platforms: Windows; Nintendo DS; Wii
- Release: NA: October 26, 2009; AU: November 5, 2009; EU: November 6, 2009
- Genre: Life simulation
- Modes: Single-player; Multiplayer

World of Zoo is a life simulation video game, published by THQ and developed by Blue Fang Games, who also developed the similar Zoo Tycoon series. World of Zoo was released for Microsoft Windows, Wii and Nintendo DS on October 26, 2009. The game was showcased in the Electronic Entertainment Expo 2009 on June 1, 2009, held in the Los Angeles Convention Center.

The game educates players about animals using facts provided by the National Geographic Society.

== Gameplay ==
Screenshot of the game's alpha version

World of Zoo will simulate a zoo, and players will care for 95 different species of animals, from 11 different families, and place it in one of the 20 exhibits. The goal of the game is to keep the animals in the zoo happy, ways to do this include: feeding the animals, playing with the animals, and improving the animals exhibits. Keeping the animals happy will result in hearts and tokens for the player, who can then redeem their hearts and tokens for food, tools, and new animals.

Certain achievements can earn the player certain objects, for example: new species can be unlocked, or in-game awards earned. One example of an in-game award is the player raising in status with one animal family, for the big cat family, awards range from, lowest to highest, "Junior Big Cat Handler" to "Big Cat Whisperer".

If the player scares the animals too much, they can attack.

The game will also feature an "Animal Creator", a feature that allows players to create and customize animals' personalities and appearances similar to Spore; along with an "Animal Adoption Network" feature—another way players can add animals.

Every animal has unique personalities and behaviors; the player's goal is to earn trust and happiness of each animal, so the player must find a method to gain trust and happiness from each animal. Trust the animal has in the player is measured via a trust meter; after the trust meter gets to rank six, the player can hypnotize animals.

Minigames are scattered throughout World of Zoo, and often pose as challenges arising in the care-taking of animals, e.g. grooming or healing.

The Wii version of the game can function as single player; but can also support multiplayer mode up to four players. The Wii Remote is used to control the game in both modes; in multiplayer, player one controls the camera.

The PC version includes six animal groups (big cats, giraffes, horses, koalas, pandas, and small monkeys), while the Wii version adds an additional five groups (antelope, bears, crocodiles, elephants, and penguins). The DS version has the same amount of animal groups as the Wii version, but with several differences. The antelope and horse groups are shrunk and merged into a "hoofed animals" group (which adds the okapi), the addition of a canids group (which includes the spotted hyena), and generally fewer animals as well as fewer tools, and changing animal exhibits.

== Reception ==
CNET and Wired stated the game is fun for children.

== See also ==
- Zoo Tycoon
- Wildlife Park
- ZooMumba
