= Zoo Tycoon (2013 video game) =

2013 business simulation video game

- North American cover art
- Developers: Frontier Developments; Asobo Studio (Ultimate Animal Collection)
- Publisher: Microsoft Studios
- Series: Zoo Tycoon
- Platforms: Xbox 360; Xbox One; Microsoft Windows
- Release: November 22, 2013
- Genre: Business simulation
- Modes: Single-player, multiplayer (Xbox One, Windows only)

Zoo Tycoon is a business simulation video game developed by Frontier Developments and published by Microsoft Studios. The game was released on November 22, 2013 for Xbox One and Xbox 360.

Microsoft announced a remaster of the game, Zoo Tycoon: Ultimate Animal Collection, for Windows 10 and the Xbox One on August 20, 2017. It features 4K resolution, HDR and 60 FPS support on Xbox One X. In addition to improved graphics and gameplay, new animals such as kangaroos, koalas, and cougars were included. It was released on October 31, 2017. There are multiple campaigns and challenges with animals from across the globe.

== Development ==
Zoo Tycoon was revealed at E3 2013 In June 2013. The gameplay that was shown included elements similar to Zoo Tycoon 2, such as a first person view, and new elements such as feeding animals in first person view. Also like its predecessor, the game allows the player to care for their animals by monitoring their mood, hunger, and thirst. Tycoon Mode, which was introduced in the first Zoo Tycoon, has also returned.

== Gameplay ==
=== Xbox One ===
The Xbox One version features both a 15-hour story campaign mode, the traditional freeform mode (infinite money), and challenge modes (short tasks lasting about 15 minutes). In addition, there are also real-time events and challenges that match real-world events. Microsoft will donate to animal charities for completion of community events, "For example, the recent Rhino killings in Nairobi park – we could set a community based achievement asking players to save 10,000 rhinos, and when unlocked, money would be given to the park or a related charity." Jonny Watts, Frontier’s Chief Creative officer, explained."

The Xbox One version features Kinect-based minigames, an option to share and upload pictures that you take on Xbox One, supported Xbox Live Online from players 1-4, and more than 100 animals in the game.

The Xbox One version allows traditional Zoo Tycoon navigation as well as a Disneyland Adventures-style 3D free roam of the park, where the player's avatar runs through the park. Interactions with the animals are similar to Kinectimals in that they include feeding, bathing, etc. The player can see the status of the animals by pressing the X button to see if they're happy and healthy, view their food and water meters, as well as social and boredom ratings.

The Xbox One version allows gamers to upload their zoos to the cloud and share them. Up to four players can work on a given zoo simultaneously. Friends can continue to work on the zoo even when the owner is not present.

=== Xbox 360 ===
The Xbox 360 version of Zoo Tycoon is almost identical to the Xbox One version. However, it only features 65 animals out of the 101 that are featured in the Xbox One version. Also, the graphics of this version are inferior to the Xbox One. This version also only features a single-player mode.

== Reception ==
Reception

Aggregate score
Aggregator	Score
Metacritic	68/100 (XONE); 70/100 (UAC, XONE)

Review scores
Publication	Score
Polygon	8/10 (XONE)
Eurogamer	8/10 (XONE)
Official Xbox Magazine UK	7/10 (XONE)
Metro	6/10 (XONE)
GameZone	6/10 (XONE)
IGN	5.5/10 (XONE)
VideoGamer.com	5/10 (XONE)

Zoo Tycoon received mixed reviews upon release. IGN gave it a 5.5/10, Official Xbox Magazine UK gave the game a 7/10, Polygon gave the game an 8/10, Hardcore Gamer gave the game a 3.5/5, Eurogamer gave the game an 8/10 while Metro gave the game a 6/10 and VideoGamer.com gave it a 5/10. GameZone gave the Xbox One version a 6/10, stating "Where Zoo Tycoon cuts corners to appeal to a wider audience, it also alienates it with overly cumbersome menus."
