= 3D Ultra Lionel Traintown =

1999 video game

- Developer: Dynamix
- Publisher: Sierra Attractions
- Composer: Christopher Stevens
- Platform: Windows
- Release: NA: September 20, 1999; NA: September 30, 2000 (Deluxe)
- Genre: Puzzle

3D Ultra Lionel Traintown is a 1999 third-person railroading game by Sierra On-Line under the casual game brand Sierra Attractions, licensed by Lionel, LLC. It consists of train layouts, some of which the player can edit.

The locomotives include a Union Pacific EMD SW1500 switcher, an Atchison, Topeka and Santa Fe Railway F3A diesel locomotive (usually used to pull passenger trains), a 2-8-0 steam locomotive, and a 1950s passenger railcar.

An enhanced version, titled 3D Ultra Lionel Traintown Deluxe, was released the following year.

== Gameplay ==
A view of gameplay on Traintown, on the living room setting

There are six difficulties, known as job rosters. Each difficulty has 11 jobs, then unlocking a twelfth. Most jobs are based on picking up and delivering loads via freight and passenger cars. Other jobs involve moving numbered freight cars to make valid addition, subtraction, multiplication, and division equations at kindergarten through fifth grade difficulty levels. There are memory-matching, pick-up sticks, hangman, Tower of Hanoi, and anagram scramble jobs with set time limits. The game has seven different play environments including a desert, the arctic, a living room, and the moon.

== Reception ==
3D Ultra Lionel Traintown won "Computer Family Entertainment Title of the Year" from the Academy of Interactive Arts and Sciences at the 3rd Annual Interactive Achievement Awards.

== See also ==
- Lionel Trains: On Track: Nintendo DS game licensed by Lionel Trains
