= 3rd Annual Interactive Achievement Awards =

Video game awards event

- Date: May 11, 2000
- Venue: Millennium Biltmore Hotel
- Country: Los Angeles, California, USA
- Hosted by: Martin Short

Highlights
- Most awards: Age of Empires II: The Age of Kings; Final Fantasy VIII; The Sims (3)
- Most nominations: Age of Empires II: The Age of Kings (7)
- Game of the Year: The Sims
- Hall of Fame: Hironobu Sakaguchi

The 3rd Annual Interactive Achievement Awards was the 3rd edition of the Interactive Achievement Awards, an annual awards event that honored the best games in the video game industry within the last nine months of 1999 and the first two months of 2000. The awards were arranged by the Academy of Interactive Arts & Sciences (AIAS), and were held at the Millennium Biltmore Hotel in Los Angeles, California on May 11, 2000 during E3 2000. It was hosted by Martin Short, and featured presenters included Martin Lewis, Ahmet Zappa, Stevie Case, Brian Fargo, Alison Sweeney, Harry Shearer, Elisa Donovan, Leah Lail, Carmine Giovinazzo, Delroy Lindo, and Peter Molyneux. This would be the final year the awards ceremony would be held during E3.

Several craft awards were split up into separate categories: "Outstanding Achievement in Art/Graphics" would be separated into the categories of "Art Direction" and "Animation", "Outstanding Achievement in Sound and Music" would be separated into the categories of "Sound Design" and "Original Music Composition", and "Software Engineering" would be replaced with "Visual Engineering" and "Gameplay Engineering". The content awards for "Adventure" and "Role-Playing", both for console and PC, were combined into "Adventure/Role-Playing Game of the Year". The console award for "Children's/Family Title of the Year" was introduced while still having a separate PC award. Only one "Educational Title of the Year" award was offered instead of having separate awards for ages 0–8 and 9-16. There were no genre-specific awards for "Online Game of the Year". This would be the final year that categories for websites would be offered.

Age of Empires II: The Age of Kings received the most nominations. It also tied for winning the most awards along with Final Fantasy VIII and The Sims, with the latter winning "Game of the Year". Electronic Arts received the most nominations, won the most awards, and had the most nominated and award-winning games. There was also a tie for the "Outstanding Achievement in Character or Story Development". Disney Interactive was the only developer with more than one award-winning game.

Hironobu Sakaguchi, creator of Final Fantasy, was inducted into the Academy of Interactive Arts & Sciences Hall of Fame.

== Winners and Nominees ==
Winners are listed first, highlighted in boldface, and indicated with a double dagger (‡).

**Game of the Year**
- **The Sims** — **Maxis**, **Electronic Arts**‡
  - Age of Empires II: The Age of Kings — Ensemble Studios, Microsoft
  - Donkey Kong 64 — Rare, Nintendo
  - Pokémon Yellow — Game Freak, Nintendo
  - Soulcalibur — Namco
  - Unreal Tournament — Epic Games, Digital Extremes, GT Interactive

=== Craft Awards ===
| **Outstanding Achievement in Game Design**: **The Sims** — **Maxis**, **Electronic Arts**‡; Age of Empires II: The Age of Kings — Ensemble Studios, Microsoft; Gran Turismo 2 — Polyphony Digital, Sony Computer Entertainment; Nox — Westwood Studios, Electronic Arts; Syphon Filter — Eidetic, 989 Studios | **Outstanding Achievement in Character or Story Development (Note: Tie between finalists.)**: **Age of Empires II: The Age of Kings** — **Ensemble Studios**, **Microsoft**‡; **Thief: The Dark Project** (Note: Thief Gold) — **Looking Glass Studios**, **Eidos Interactive**‡; Nox — Westwood Studios, Electronic Arts; Omikron: The Nomad Soul — Quantic Dream, Eidos Interactive; Planescape: Torment — Black Isle Studios, Interplay Entertainment |
| **Outstanding Achievement in Animation**: **Final Fantasy VIII** — **SquareSoft**, **Square Electronic Arts**‡; Age of Empires II: The Age of Kings — Ensemble Studios, Microsoft; Disney's Villains' Revenge — Disney Interactive; Spyro 2: Ripto's Rage! — Insomniac Games, Sony Computer Entertainment | **Outstanding Achievement in Art Direction**: **Final Fantasy VIII** — **SquareSoft**, **Square Electronic Arts**‡; Disney's Villains' Revenge — Disney Interactive; Pharaoh — Impressions Games, Sierra On-Line; Spyro 2: Ripto's Rage! — Insomniac Games, Sony Computer Entertainment; The Sims — Maxis, Electronic Arts |
| **Outstanding Achievement in Sound Design**: **Medal of Honor** — **DreamWorks Interactive**, **Electronic Arts**‡; NFL 2K — Visual Concepts, Sega; Thief: The Dark Project — Looking Glass Studios, Eidos Interactive | **Outstanding Achievement in Original Music Composition**: **Um Jammer Lammy** — **NanaOn-Sha**, **Sony Computer Entertainment**‡; Outcast — Appeal, Infogrames; Silver — Spiral House, Infogrames |
| **Outstanding Achievement in Game Play Engineering**: **The Sims** — **Maxis**, **Electronic Arts**‡; Age of Empires II: The Age of Kings — Ensemble Studios, Microsoft; Crazy Taxi — Hitmaker, Sega; NFL 2K — Visual Concepts, Sega | **Outstanding Achievement in Visual Engineering**: **Unreal Tournament** — **Epic Games**, **Digital Extremes**, **GT Interactive**‡; NBA 2K — Visual Concepts, Sega; NFL 2K — Visual Concepts, Sega; Sonic Adventure — Sonic Team, Sega |

=== Content Awards ===
==== Console ====
**Console Game of the Year**: **Soulcalibur** — **Namco**‡; Crazy Taxi — Hitmaker, Sega; Donkey Kong 64 — Rare, Nintendo; Driver — Reflections Interactive, GT Interactive; Gran Turismo 2 — Polyphony Digital, Sony Computer Entertainment; Pokémon Yellow — Game Freak, Nintendo; Tony Hawk's Pro Skater — Neversoft, Activision
| **Console Action Game of the Year**: **Crazy Taxi** — **Hitmaker**, **Sega**‡; Armada — Metro3D; Gauntlet Legends — Midway Games; Super Smash Bros. — HAL Laboratory, Nintendo; Syphon Filter — Eidetic, 989 Studios | **Console Adventure/Role-Playing Game of the Year**: **Final Fantasy VIII** — **SquareSoft**, **Square Electronic Arts**‡; Legacy of Kain: Soul Reaver — Crystal Dynamics, Eidos Interactive; Legend of Legaia — Contrail, Sony Computer Entertainment |
| **Console Fighting Game of the Year**: **Soulcalibur** — **Namco**‡; Ready 2 Rumble Boxing — Midway Studios San Diego, Midway Games; Super Smash Bros. — HAL Laboratory, Nintendo; WWF WrestleMania 2000 — AKI Corporation, THQ | **Console Racing Game of the Year**: **Star Wars Episode I: Racer** — **LucasArts**‡; Crash Team Racing — Naughty Dog, Sony Computer Entertainment; Driver — Reflections Interactive, GT Interactive; Gran Turismo 2 — Polyphony Digital, Sony Computer Entertainment |
| **Console Children's/Family Title of the Year**: **Pokémon Snap** — **HAL Laboratory**, **Nintendo**‡; Lego Racers — High Voltage Software, Lego Media; Mario Party — Hudson Soft, Nintendo; Spyro 2: Ripto's Rage! — Insomniac Games, Sony Computer Entertainment; Toy Story 2: Buzz Lightyear to the Rescue — Traveller's Tales, Disney Interactive, Activision | **Console Sports Game of the Year**: **Knockout Kings 2000** — **Black Ops Entertainment**, **EA Sports**‡; NFL 2K — Visual Concepts, Sega; Tony Hawk's Pro Skater — Neversoft, Activision |

==== Personal Computer ====
| **Computer Game of the Year**: **Age of Empires II: The Age of Kings** — **Ensemble Studios**, **Microsoft**‡; Command & Conquer: Tiberian Sun — Westwood Studios, Electronic Arts; Homeworld — Relic Entertainment, Sierra On-Line; RollerCoaster Tycoon — Chris Sawyer Productions, Hasbro Interactive; Unreal Tournament — Epic Games, Digital Extremes, GT Interactive | **PC Action Game of the Year**: **Half-Life: Opposing Force** — **Gearbox Software**, **Sierra On-Line**‡; Quake III Arena — id Software, Activision; Tom Clancy's Rainbow Six: Rogue Spear — Red Storm Entertainment; Unreal Tournament — Epic Games, Digital Extremes, GT Interactive |
| **PC Adventure/Role-Playing Game of the Year**: **Asheron's Call** — **Turbine**, **Microsoft**‡; Gabriel Knight 3: Blood of the Sacred, Blood of the Damned — Sierra On-Line; Outcast — Appeal, Infogrames; Planescape: Torment — Black Isle Studios, Interplay Entertainment; Ultima IX: Ascension — Origin Systems, Electronic Arts | **PC Simulation Game of the Year**: **Microsoft Flight Simulator 2000** — **Aces Game Studio**, **Microsoft**‡; FreeSpace 2 — Volition, Interplay Entertainment; Jane's F/A-18 — EA Baltimore; MiG Alley — Rowan Software, Empire Interactive; Star Wars: X-Wing Alliance — Totally Games, LucasArts |
| **PC Sports Game of the Year**: **FIFA 2000** — **EA Canada**‡; Backyard Football — Humongous Entertainment; High Heat Baseball 2000 — Team .366, The 3DO Company; NHL 2000 — EA Canada | **PC Strategy Game of the Year**: **Age of Empires II: The Age of Kings** — **Ensemble Studios**, **Microsoft**‡; Command & Conquer: Tiberian Sun — Westwood Studios, Electronic Arts; Heroes of Might and Magic III — New World Computing, The 3DO Company; Homeworld — Relic Entertainment, Sierra On-Line; RollerCoaster Tycoon — Chris Sawyer Productions, Hasbro Interactive |
| **PC Creativity Title of the Year**: **Disney's Magic Artist Studio** — **Disney Interactive**‡; Cosmopolitan Virtual Makeover 2 — Mattel Interactive; Lego Friends — Lego Media; Total 3D Home Deluxe — Mattel Interactive, The Learning Company | **PC Family Entertainment Title of the Year**: **3D Ultra Lionel Traintown** — **Dynamix**, **Sierra On-Line**‡; Complete National Geographic — National Geographic Interactive, Mattel Interactive; Miss Spider's Tea Party — Hypnotix, Simon & Schuster Interactive; Pandora's Box — Microsoft; The Sims — Maxis, Electronic Arts; You Don't Know Jack Offline — Berkeley Systems, Sierra On-Line |
| **PC Children's Entertainment Title of the Year**: **Disney's Villains' Revenge** — **Disney Interactive**‡; Lego Racers — High Voltage Software, Lego Media; Miss Spider's Tea Party — Hypnotix, Simon & Schuster Interactive; Sesame Street Music Maker — Sesame Workshop, Mattel Interactive | **PC Educational Title of the Year**: **JumpStart Phonics Learning System** — **Knowledge Adventure**‡; Bear in the Big Blue House: Bear's Sense of Adventure — Knowledge Adventure; Blue's 123 Time Activities — Humongous Entertainment; Math Blaster for 1st Grade — Knowledge Adventure; Space Academy GX-1 — Edmark; The ClueFinders 5th Grade Adventures — Mattel Interactive, The Learning Company |

==== Online ====
**Online Game of the Year**: **EverQuest** — **Verant Interactive**, **989 Studios**, **Sony Online Entertainment**‡; Asheron's Call — Turbine, Microsoft; Get the Picture — Berkeley Systems; Pop-Tarts — Magnet Interactive; Wordox — World Opponent Network, Sierra On-Line
| **Online Entertainment Site of the Year**: **TheOnion.com**‡; ABC.com; Banja.com — CHMAN; CalendarLive.com — The Los Angeles Times; Tony the Tiger Website — Magnet Interactive, Kellogg's; Entertaindom.com — AOL Time Warner; IGN.com - Snowball.com | **Online News/Information Site of the Year**: **GameSpot.com**‡; CNN Online |

=== Hall of Fame Award ===
- Hironobu Sakaguchi

=== Multiple nominations and awards ===
==== Multiple Nominations ====
Games that received multiple nominations
| Nominations | Game |
|---|---|
| 7 | Age of Empires II: The Age of Kings |
| 5 | The Sims |
| 4 | NFL 2K |
| 4 | Unreal Tournament |
| 3 | Crazy Taxi |
| 3 | Disney's Villains' Revenge |
| 3 | Final Fantasy VIII |
| 3 | Gran Turismo 2 |
| 3 | Soulcalibur |
| 3 | Spyro 2: Ripto's Rage! |
| 2 | Asheron's Call |
| 2 | Command & Conquer: Tiberian Sun |
| 2 | Donkey Kong 64 |
| 2 | Driver |
| 2 | Homeworld |
| 2 | Lego Racers |
| 2 | Miss Spider's Tea Party |
| 2 | Nox |
| 2 | Outcast |
| 2 | Planescape: Torment |
| 2 | Pokémon Yellow |
| 2 | RollerCoaster Tycoon |
| 2 | Super Smash Bros. |
| 2 | Syphon Filter |
| 2 | Thief: The Dark Project |
| 2 | Tony Hawk's Pro Skater |

Nominations by company
| Nominations | Games | Company |
|---|---|---|
| 18 | 10 | Electronic Arts |
| 11 | 4 | Microsoft |
| 10 | 6 | Sony Computer Entertainment |
| 9 | 4 | Sega |
| 8 | 5 | Nintendo |
| 8 | 6 | Sierra On-Line |
| 7 | 1 | Ensemble Studios |
| 6 | 2 | GT Interactive |
| 5 | 5 | Mattel Interactive |
| 5 | 3 | Disney Interactive |
| 5 | 2 | Visual Concepts |
| 5 | 1 | Maxis |
| 4 | 4 | Digital Extremes |
| 4 | 4 | Epic Games |
| 4 | 3 | Activision |
| 4 | 3 | Eidos Interactive |
| 4 | 2 | Westwood Studios |
| 3 | 3 | Knowledge Adventure |
| 3 | 2 | 989 Studios |
| 3 | 2 | HAL Laboratory |
| 3 | 2 | Infogrames |
| 3 | 2 | Interplay Entertainment |
| 3 | 2 | Lego Media |
| 3 | 1 | Hitmaker |
| 3 | 1 | Insomniac Games |
| 3 | 1 | Namco |
| 3 | 1 | Polyphony Digital |
| 3 | 1 | SquareSoft |
| 2 | 2 | Berkeley Systems |
| 2 | 2 | Eidetic |
| 2 | 2 | Humongous Entertainment |
| 2 | 2 | LucasArts |
| 2 | 2 | Magnet Interactive |
| 2 | 2 | Midway Games |
| 2 | 2 | The 3DO Company |
| 2 | 1 | Appeal |
| 2 | 1 | Black Isle Studios |
| 2 | 1 | Chris Sawyer Productions |
| 2 | 1 | Game Freak |
| 2 | 1 | Hasbro Interactive |
| 2 | 1 | High Voltage Software |
| 2 | 1 | Hypnotix |
| 2 | 1 | Looking Glass Studios |
| 2 | 1 | Neversoft |
| 2 | 1 | Rare |
| 2 | 1 | Relic Entertainment |
| 2 | 1 | Simon & Schuster Interactive |
| 2 | 1 | Turbine |

==== Multiple awards ====
Games that received multiple awards
| Awards | Game |
|---|---|
| 3 | Age of Empires II: The Age of Kings |
| 3 | Final Fantasy VIII |
| 3 | The Sims |
| 2 | Soulcalibur |

Awards by company
| Awards | Games | Company |
|---|---|---|
| 9 | 5 | Electronic Arts |
| 5 | 3 | Microsoft |
| 3 | 1 | Ensemble Studios |
| 3 | 1 | Maxis |
| 3 | 1 | SquareSoft |
| 2 | 2 | Disney Interactive |
| 2 | 2 | Sierra On-Line |
| 2 | 2 | Sony Computer Entertainment |
| 2 | 1 | Namco |
