= Blue Fang Games =

American video game developer

- Company type: Corporation
- Industry: Video games
- Founded: 1998
- Defunct: 2011
- Headquarters: Waltham, Massachusetts, United States
- Key people: Hank Howie; Adam Levesque; John Wheeler
- Products: Zoo Tycoon series
- Number of employees: 75 (2009)

Blue Fang Games, LLC was an American video game developer. Founded in Waltham, Massachusetts in 1998, they achieved commercial success with their first title, Zoo Tycoon, on Windows and Macintosh. They went on to develop a sequel and numerous expansion packs for the Zoo Tycoon franchise. However, as the video game market shifted away from packaged games with long development cycles, the studio struggled to adapt. After publishing several titles for mobile and social platforms with little commercial success, the studio shut down in 2011.

== History ==
Blue Fang Games was founded in Waltham, Massachusetts in the summer of 1998. Its founders included Adam Levesque and John Wheeler, former employees of Papyrus Design Group who had worked on the NASCAR Racing series. The company was initially reported to be working on a fantasy role-playing game. This project was ultimately cancelled; former Blue Fang president Hank Howie said in 2020, "Originally, Blue Fang was supposed to do a game about dragons, but that was way too big for our small team."

The team was then inspired by RollerCoaster Tycoon to pivot to a management simulation game. According to the company, they developed the concept for the Zoo Tycoon in fall of 1999, and signed a publishing deal with Microsoft in fall of 2000. The game released in late 2001 and was a commercial success, reaching 2 million sales domestically and 4 million internationally by July 2004. Blue Fang released several expansion packs for the game and began development on a sequel.

Zoo Tycoon 2 was released in November 2004. It was similarly successful, ranking as the 19th best-selling computer game of 2004, and several expansion packs were published.

Plans for a Zoo Tycoon 3 were started but ultimately scrapped as the company shifted away from developing PC games. The company reached its peak head count of 75 employees in 2009, the same year it published World of Zoo for Windows, Nintendo DS and Wii with publisher THQ. This game was not a commercial success, and marked a downturn for the studio. "The collapse of the Wii market really hurt," said Howie.

The company then attempted a pivot from packaged games to mobile and social network games. They released Lion Pride for iOS in 2009, and worked with The Learning Company to port some of its older games to Facebook. Where in the World is Carmen Sandiego? and The Oregon Trail were developed in three months and released on Facebook in 2011. According to Howie, the short development timeline and a poor working relationship with The Learning Company led to the failure of these titles. The studio reportedly laid off its development staff in July 2011, and closed down in September.

== Games ==
Title	Release date	Platform
Zoo Tycoon	2001	Microsoft Windows, Macintosh
• Dinosaur Digs	2002	Microsoft Windows
• Marine Mania	2002	Microsoft Windows
• Complete Collection	2003	Microsoft Windows
Zoo Tycoon 2	2004	Microsoft Windows, Macintosh
• Endangered Species	2005	Microsoft Windows
• African Adventure	2006	Microsoft Windows
• Dino Danger Pack	2006	Microsoft Windows
• Zookeeper Collection	2006	Microsoft Windows
• Marine Mania	2006	Microsoft Windows
• Extinct Animals	2007	Microsoft Windows
• Ultimate Collection	2008	Microsoft Windows
Zoo Tycoon DS	2005	Nintendo DS
Zoo Tycoon 2 DS	2008	Nintendo DS
World of Zoo	2009	Microsoft Windows, Nintendo DS, Wii
Lion Pride	2009	iOS
Zoo Kingdom	2010	Facebook
Where in the World is Carmen Sandiego?	2011	Facebook
The Oregon Trail	2011	Facebook
