= Zoo Tycoon (2001 video game) =

2001 video game

- Developer: Blue Fang Games
- Publisher: Microsoft
- Designers: Adam Levesque; Steven Serafino
- Programmer: John Wheeler
- Artist: Lou Catanzaro
- Composer: Steven Serafino
- Series: Zoo Tycoon
- Platforms: Windows, Macintosh
- Release: October 17, 2001
- Genre: Business simulation
- Mode: Single-player

Zoo Tycoon is a business simulation game developed by Blue Fang Games and released by Microsoft for Microsoft Windows and Macintosh in 2001. A version for the Nintendo DS was released in 2005, called Zoo Tycoon DS. It was followed by two expansion packs, Dinosaur Digs and Marine Mania, which were released in 2002, as well as a sequel, Zoo Tycoon 2, released in 2004.

== Gameplay ==
A basic zoo with giraffes in one enclosure

The goal of Zoo Tycoon is to create a thriving zoo by building exhibits to accommodate animals and keeping the guests and animals happy. Exhibit-building is one of the primary goals of Zoo Tycoon. To keep the guests and animals happy, exhibits should be suitable to the animal. For example, a lion is best suited to a savanna environment. Choices in rocks, terrain, foliage, shelters, fences, toys and the presence of zookeepers all contribute to the suitability of an exhibit and the happiness of the animal. Guest happiness is dependent on animal choice, animal happiness, buildings, and scenery. Buildings include attractions, bathrooms, restaurants and food stands, gift shops, animal houses, such as insect houses, primate houses, reptile houses, nocturnal houses and aviaries, plant houses, petting zoos, and entertainment buildings like movie theaters. Scenery involves aesthetics that raise guest happiness slightly, such as topiary art, light posts, and benches. Keeping both animal and guest happiness high allows the player to gain monetary awards and maintain a steady income. To help manage the expanding zoo, the player can employ maintenance workers, zookeepers and tour guides. If the animals escape from their enclosures, they can attack and possibly kill guests and employees. Each of the animals have a predefined set of other species they can attack. If both incompatible animal species are placed in the same exhibit, the attacker will immediately run towards and attack the victim, a cloud of dust will appear shortly, and the animal will get killed. This behavior is not limited to carnivores, as some large herbivores are also able to kill other animals. Baby animals, with an exception for some dinosaurs, will normally not attack other animals. Fences decay over time, so the player will have to replace them to prevent animals from escaping. If the player has poor zoo maintenance and receives too many complaints about unhappy animals, they must fix their habitats or they will not adopt any more of them.

There are three modes in Zoo Tycoon: Tutorial, Scenario, and Freeform. Tutorial teaches the player how to build exhibits and keep guests happy. Scenario mode tasks the player with completing a series of objectives under restrictions. These objectives may include achieving a certain guest and animal happiness, achieving a certain exhibit suitability, displaying a certain number of animals, or breeding a certain animal. Freeform allows the player to choose the amount of money and the map with which they start. They are presented with an open lot and a limited selection of animals, buildings, and scenery available for purchase. As the game progresses, more animals and items become playable. Additional animals and items may be researched, where money is invested to make them playable.

== Animal roster ==
=== Base game ===
| Common Name | Scientific Name | Notes |
|---|---|---|
| African buffalo | Syncerus caffer | |
| African elephant | Loxodonta africana | |
| African lion | Panthera leo | |
| African warthog | Phacochoerus africanus | |
| American bighorn sheep | Ovis canadensis | |
| American bison | Bison bison | |
| Arctic wolf | Canis lupus arctos | |
| Bengal tiger | Panthera tigris tigris | |
| Black bear | Ursus americanus | |
| Black leopard | Panthera pardus | Black leopards in real life are just melanistic. Black leopards are included as a separate species in the game due to technical limitations |
| Black rhinoceros | Diceros bicornis | |
| California sea lion | Zalophus califorianus californianus (now recognized as Zalophus californianus) | At the time of release, California sea lions were seen as the same species as Galapagos and Japanese sea lions, hence the distinction of the California sea lion being a subspecies in-game. |
| Cheetah | Acinonyx jubatus | |
| Chimpanzee | Pan troglodytes | |
| Clouded leopard | Neofelis nebulosa | |
| Common wildebeest | Connochaetes taurinus | |
| Dromedary camel | Camelus dromedarius | |
| Emperor penguin | Aptenodytes forsteri | There is a glitch where the emperor penguin can kill any other species in the game. |
| Gemsbok | Oryx gazella | |
| Giant anteater | Myrmecophaga tridactyla | |
| Giant panda | Ailuropoda melanoleuca | |
| Giraffe | Giraffa camelopardalis | |
| Gray wolf | Canis lupus | Despite the Arctic wolf in the game being correctly assigned to C. l. arctos, the gray wolf was not assigned to any specific subspecies. |
| Greater flamingo | Phoenicopterus roseus | |
| Grizzly bear | Ursus arctos horribilis | |
| Hippopotamus | Hippopotamus amphibius | |
| Ibex | Capra ibex | |
| Jaguar | Panthera onca | |
| Leopard | Panthera pardus | |
| Lowland gorilla | Gorilla beringei graueri | |
| Mandrill | Mandrillus sphinx | |
| Markhor | Capra falconeri | |
| Moose | Alces alces | |
| Okapi | Okapia johnstoni | |
| Olive baboon | Papio anubis | |
| Ostrich | Struthio camelus | |
| Plains zebra | Equus burchellii (now recognized as Equus quagga) | |
| Polar bear | Ursus maritimus | |
| Red kangaroo | Osphranter rufus | |
| Saltwater crocodile | Crocodylus porosus | |
| Siberian tiger | Panthera tigris altaica (now recognized as Panthera tigris tigris) | Since the release of the game, tiger's have been reassigned as only two subspecies, with both Bengal and Siberian tigers being placed into the same group. |
| Snow leopard | Uncia uncia (now recognized as Panthera uncia) | |
| Spotted hyena | Crocuta crocuta | |
| Thomson's gazelle | Gazella thomsonii (now recognized as Eudorcas thomsonii) | |
| Triceratops | Triceratops horridus | Triceratops is unlockable by naming any exhibit 'Cretaceous Corral'. |
| White Bengal tiger | Panthera tigris tigris | White tigers in real life are just Leucistic. White tigers are included as a separate species in the game due to technical limitations as mentioned above. |
| Unicorn | No scientific name | Unicorns are unlockable by naming any exhibit "Xanadu". |

=== Downloadable content ===
| Common name | Scientific name | Notes |
|---|---|---|
| African wild dog | Lycaon pictus | |
| Asian black bear | Ursus thibetanus | |
| Asian elephant | Elephas maximus | |
| Blackbuck | Antilope cervicapra | |
| Bongo | Tragelaphus eurycerus | |
| Gallimimus | Gallimimus bullatus | This DLC would exclusively work with the Dinosaur Digs expansion. |
| Great barracuda | Sphyraena barracuda | This DLC would exclusively work with the Marine Mania expansion. |
| Llama | Lama glama | |
| Macrauchenia | Macrauchenia patachonica | This DLC would exclusively work with the Dinosaur Digs expansion. |
| Giant ground sloth | Megatherium americanum | This DLC would exclusively work with the Dinosaur Digs expansion. |
| Mexican gray wolf | Canis lupus baileyi | Also released as part of the Endangered Species Theme Pack. |
| Mountain lion | Puma concolor | |
| Plateosaurus | Plateosaurus engelhardti | This DLC would exclusively work with the Dinosaur Digs expansion. |
| Reindeer | Rangifer tarandus | |
| Sable antelope | Hippotragus niger | |
| Yeti | No scientific name | |
| Magnet | Ursus maritimus | Magnet was a real polar bear who lived in the Maryland Zoo in Baltimore. He won best in show in Zoo Tycoon's Best Zoo Animal contest in December 2001, and was then added to the game as a DLC animal. |

=== Dinosaur Digs ===
| Animal House | Installment | Notes |
|---|---|---|
| Allosaurus | Allosaurus fragilis | |
| Ankylosaurus | Ankylosaurus magniventris | |
| Apatosaurus | Apatosaurus excelsus (now recognized as Brontosaurus excelsus) | At the time of release, the genus Brontosaurus was considered invalid. The species has since been determined to be distinct from other Apatosaurus species and reassigned to Brontosaurus. |
| Camptosaurus | Camptosaurus dispar | |
| Caudipteryx | Caudipteryx zoui | |
| Coelophysis | Coelophysis bauri | |
| Deinosuchus | Deinosuchus hatcheri | Deinosuchus is unlockable by naming any exhibit 'Super Croc'. |
| Giant tortoise | Meiolania platyceps | |
| Herrerasaurus | Herrerasaurus ischigualastensis | |
| Iguanodon | Iguanodon bernissartensis | |
| Kentrosaurus | Kentrosaurus aethiopicus | |
| Lambeosaurus | Lambeosaurus lambei | |
| Plesiosaurus | Plesiosaurus dolichodeirus | |
| Sabre-toothed cat | Smilodon fatalis | |
| Spinosaurus | Spinosaurus aegyptiacus | |
| Stegosaurus | Stegosaurus armatus (now recognized as Stegosaurus stenops) | Since the release of the game, S. armatus as a species has been invalidated as a dubious junior synonym of Stegosaurus stenops. S. stenops has replaced S. armatus as the type species. |
| Styracosaurus | Styracosaurus albertensis | |
| Triceratops | Triceratops horridus | Triceratops is acquirable normally in this expansion. |
| Tyrannosaurus rex | Tyrannosaurus rex | |
| Velociraptor | Velociraptor mongoliensis | |
| Woolly mammoth | Mammuthus primigenius | |
| Woolly rhinoceros | Coelodonta antiquitatis | |

=== Marine Mania ===
| Common name | Scientific name | Notes |
|---|---|---|
| Atlantic swordfish | Xiphias gladius | |
| Beluga | Delphinapterus leucas | |
| Bluefin tuna | Thunnus thynnus | |
| Bottlenose dolphin | Tursiops truncatus | |
| Giant Pacific octopus | Enteroctopus dofleini | |
| Giant squid | Architeuthis dux | |
| Great hammerhead shark | Sphyrna mokarran | |
| Great white shark | Carcharodon carcharias | |
| Green moray eel | Gymnothorax funebris | |
| Green sea turtle | Chelonia mydas | |
| Harbor porpoise | Phocoena phocoena | |
| Humpback whale | Megaptera novaeangliae | |
| Lion's mane jellyfish | Cyanea capillata | |
| Manta ray | Manta birostris (now recognized as Mobula birostris) | |
| Mermaid | No scientific name | |
| Narwhal | Monodon monoceros | |
| Northern elephant seal | Mirounga angustirostris | |
| Orca | Orcinus orca | |
| Southern sea otter | Enhydra lutris nereis | |
| Shortfin mako shark | Isurus oxyrinchus | |
| Sperm whale | Physeter macrocephalus | |
| Tiger shark | Galeocerdo cuvier | |
| Walrus | Odobenus rosmarus divergens | The O. r. divergens subspecies of walrus, specifically refers to the Pacific population. |
| West Indian manatee | Trichechus manatus | |

=== Endangered Species Theme Pack ===
| Common name | Scientific name | Notes |
|---|---|---|
| Bigfoot | No scientific name | |
| Bowhead whale | Balaena mysticetus | |
| Common sawfish | Pristis pristis | |
| Japanese serow | Naemorhedus crispus (now recognized as Capricornis crispus) | |
| Javan rhinoceros | Rhinoceros sondaicus | |
| Komodo dragon | Varanus komodoensis | |
| Loch Ness Monster | No scientific name | This species would exclusively work with the Dinosaur Digs expansion. |
| Malayan tapir | Tapirus indicus | |
| Mexican gray wolf | Canis lupus baileyi | Also released by itself. |
| Orangutan | Pongo pygmaeus | |
| Przewalski's wild horse | Equus przewalskii (now recognized as Equus ferus przewalskii) | |
| Whale shark | Rhincodon typus | |

=== Animal houses ===
| Animal house | Exhibits | | | Installment | Notes |
|---|---|---|---|---|---|
| Bat House | Dawn Bats of Southeast Asia | Giant Fruit Bats of Southeast Asia | Sulawesi flying foxes of the Southeast Asia | Zoo Tycoon (2001, base game) | Image used: Dawn bat (a.k.a. cave nectar bat), Sulawesi flying fox and fruit bat |
| Bird House | Birds of the Tropical Rainforest | Birds of Africa | Raptors of the World | Zoo Tycoon (2001, base game) | Image used: Keel-billed toucan, grey parrot and bald eagle |
| Crustacean House | Crayfish of the Mississippi | Horseshoe Crabs of Delaware Bay | Spider Crabs of the North Atlantic | Zoo Tycoon: Marine Mania (2002) | Icon images used: crayfish, Atlantic horseshoe crab and spider crab |
| Insect House | Scorpions of the Africa | Venomous Spiders | | Zoo Tycoon (2001, base game) | Icon images used: emperor scorpion and tarantula |
| Lepospondyl House | Triadobatrachus | Karaurus | Diplocaulus | Zoo Tycoon: Dinosaur Digs (2002) | |
| Primate House | Primates of the Southeast Asia | Lemurs of the Madagascar | Endangered Primates of the World | Zoo Tycoon (2001, base game) | Image used: chimpanzee (not from Southeast Asia), sifaka and juvenile orangutan |
| Pteranodon House | Rhamphorhynchus | Pterodactylus | Dimorphodon | Zoo Tycoon: Dinosaur Digs (2002) | 'Pteranodon' specifically refers to a single genus of large flying reptile. The building should be 'Pterosaur House' to refer to the broader group of animals. |
| Reptile House | Reptiles of the Tropical Rainforest | Deadly Snakes of the World | | Zoo Tycoon (2001, base game) | Image used: Galapagos tortoise and king cobra |
| Tropical Aquarium | Clownfish of the Pacific | Angelfish of the Amazon | Blue Tang of the Bermuda | Zoo Tycoon: Marine Mania (2002) | Image used: ocellaris clownfish, angelfish and blue tang |

== Development ==
Blue Fang Games originally considered making a simulation game where the player would manage an airport, before the idea was dismissed by CEO Hank Howie, citing that compared to places like theme parks, airports are not "fun". The team then pivoted to a zoo building game, and quickly began research on animal care and behavior, sending artists, animators and developers to zoos in and around the Boston area, as well as flying a team out to the San Francisco Zoo. The team learned how zoos work in order to figure out where they were allowed to take creative liberties, citing that during the development for the Marine Mania expansion, the team gave dolphins the ability to do tricks which were not completely realistic because they thought it was more fun. The development team also tried to strike a balance between teaching players about conservation and entertainment, citing the educational efforts put forth in real zoos.

== Expansion packs ==
Zoo Tycoon received two expansion packs: Dinosaur Digs, which added prehistoric-themed items and animals including mythical creatures, and Marine Mania, which added aquatic-themed items and animals.

=== Dinosaur Digs ===
Released on May 19, 2002, Dinosaur Digs features 20 new prehistoric animals to choose from including mammoths, saber-toothed cats, and varied dinosaurs as well as prehistoric-themed items and buildings. In addition, new types of electrical fences to accommodate the animals and prehistoric foliage have been introduced. As in the previous game, more extinct animals, foliage and better care for dinosaurs can be researched. Each dinosaur is adopted as an egg. The game introduces a new staff member, the scientist, to care for the egg and, once it hatches, the dinosaur itself.

=== Marine Mania ===
The second expansion pack, Marine Mania, was released on October 17, 2002. The expansion allows players to create and manage underwater exhibits or merge aquatic tanks with traditional land habitats. Interactive tutorials and virtual marine specialists are available to help players maintain animal happiness. In addition, there are also indoor aquarium buildings and 10 new scenarios were added. The expansion pack also provides the ability to create aquatic shows.

=== Complete Collection ===
Microsoft bundled the expansion packs with Zoo Tycoon to create Zoo Tycoon Complete Collection, having the functionality of both expansion packs and bonus content. The Complete Collection also included a new Endangered Species theme pack.

== Reception ==
Reception

Aggregate scores
| Aggregator | Score |
|---|---|
| GameRankings | 68.74% (based on 23 reviews) |
| Metacritic | 68/100 (based on 18 reviews) |

Review scores
| Publication | Score |
|---|---|
| Computer Gaming World | 3.5/5 |
| Game Informer | 7.5/10; 8.75/10 |
| GameSpot | 7.1/10 |
| GameSpy | 67/100 |
| IGN | 6.9/10 |
| Next Generation | 3/5 |
| PC Gamer (US) | 48% |
| Computer Games Magazine | 4.5/5 |
| Macworld | 4/5 |
| MacHome Journal | 4/5 |

Zoo Tycoon was received with mixed to positive reviews, gaining an average 68 out of 100 at Metacritic. GameZone gave the game a score of 8 out of 10. Eric Bratcher reviewed the PC version for Next Generation, rating it three stars out of five, and stated that "A pleasant diversion, but it's about as deep as a puddle, and frustratingly finicky." Zoo Tycoon and its compiled Complete Collection garnered several awards and accolades, gaining the Bologna New Media Prize in 2002. Zoo Tycoon: Complete Collection received the Parents' Choice Foundation Gold Award - 2003, the AIAS Computer Family Game of the Year Interactive Achievement Award - 2004, the Scholastic Parent & Child Teacher's Pick – 2004, and the Children's Software Revue All Star Award – 2004.

=== Sales ===
Zoo Tycoon was a commercial success. Within a year of release, the game rose above 1 million copies in sales. By October 2003, its global sales had surpassed 2.5 million copies, or 3 million when grouped with its expansion packs. The NPD Group declared it the eighth-best-selling computer game of 2002, and the 11th-best-selling of 2003. NPD proceeded to rank the game's Zoo Tycoon: Complete Collection bundle 10th for 2004, 16th for 2005 and 12th for 2006.

In the United States alone, Zoo Tycoon sold 1.1 million units and earned $28.2 million by August 2006. It was among the country's 15 highest-selling computer games ever by July 2004, and Edge ranked it as the country's fifth-best-selling computer game released between January 2000 and August 2006. Zoo Tycoon also received a "Gold" sales award from the Entertainment and Leisure Software Publishers Association (ELSPA), indicating sales of at least 200,000 copies in the United Kingdom; and a "Gold" certification from the Verband der Unterhaltungssoftware Deutschland (VUD), for sales of at least 100,000 units across Germany, Switzerland and Austria.

The Zoo Tycoon series, including the original Zoo Tycoon, surpassed 4 million copies in global sales by July 2004. Over 2 million copies of the series were sold in the United States alone by that date. Series sales in the country rose to 2.9 million units by August 2006.

== Sequel ==
Zoo Tycoon 2 was released in November 2004. Although initially containing fewer animals than Zoo Tycoon, more animals were introduced in its expansion packs: Zoo Tycoon 2: Endangered Species, Zoo Tycoon 2: African Adventure, Zoo Tycoon 2: Marine Mania, and Zoo Tycoon 2: Extinct Animals. The first two were bundled in the Zoo Tycoon 2: Zookeeper Collection; all of them were bundled in Zoo Tycoon 2 Ultimate Collection.
