= Zoo Tycoon: Dinosaur Digs =

- Developer: Blue Fang Games
- Publisher: Microsoft Game Studios
- Series: Zoo Tycoon
- Platform: Microsoft Windows
- Release: NA: 17 May 2002; UK: 19 July 2002
- Genre: Simulation
- Mode: Single-player

Zoo Tycoon: Dinosaur Digs is a 2002 expansion pack developed by Blue Fang Games and published by Microsoft Game Studios for the 2001 simulation video game Zoo Tycoon. Dinosaur Digs allows players to add dinosaurs and other extinct animals into the game, introducing new challenges to contain and manage them in their zoo. Upon release, Dinosaur Digs received mixed reviews, with praise directed at the novelty and appeal of the game's premise but criticism of how dinosaurs were implemented and the lack of changes to core gameplay mechanics. The dinosaur-themed features in Dinosaur Digs were similarly introduced in the Dino Danger Pack and Extinct Animals DLC packs for Zoo Tycoon 2.

== Gameplay ==
Dinosaur Digs adds new dinosaurs for display and more secure enclosures to keep them contained.

Dinosaur Digs adds a new category of animals containing twenty species of dinosaurs and other extinct animals to the game, which players can display at their park. Dinosaurs are managed with a new employee, the scientist, which plays a similar role to the zookeeper in the original game. Dinosaurs, including Tyrannosaurus rex, Allosaurus and Velociraptor, must be purchased as eggs, which are then incubated and hatched by a scientist, although the game adds a few additional extinct mammal species as well, including the woolly mammoth, which are instead added to the zoo like normal animals. Dinosaurs pose greater escape risks compared to other animals, as they are more capable of damaging fencing to escape when they are unhappy, and players must contain dinosaurs in special exhibits surrounded by dinosaur-specific fences, including electrified fences. Players can purchase and deploy a Dinosaur Recovery Team to capture dinosaurs that have escaped from their exhibits.

Dinosaur Digs also features six new scenarios, new decorative objects and buildings, and minor gameplay additions, including a building management tool allowing players to sort and compare buildings to see average profits, as well as a way to toggle the visibility of guests, foliage, and buildings.

== Reception ==
=== Reviews ===
Reception

Aggregate score
Aggregator	Score
Metacritic	67%

Review scores
Publication	Score
Computer Gaming World	3.5/5 stars
GameSpot	6.4
GameSpy	69%
IGN	7/10
PC Gamer (US)	56%
PC Zone	40%
Gameplanet	3/5 stars

According to review aggregator platform Metacritic, Dinosaur Digs received "mixed or average" reviews from critics. Dan Adams of IGN praised the game for adding "plenty to the formula" with its features and items and said it was "well worth the time" for fans of the game. Elizabeth McAdams of Computer Gaming World considered the game a "refreshing twist" that integrated "seamlessly" into the original gameplay, whilst noting that the expansion did not "drastically revitalize" the core gameplay. Thomas Mahoney of Gameplanet praised the addition of dinosaurs for their "personality" and their "unique" animations and sounds, and considered the expansion to add to the "entertainment factor" and "longevity" of the core game. PC Zone wrote that the expansion added little other than dinosaurs to the game, and critiqued it as "more demanding" than the original due to the "painstaking" fine-tuning of enclosures, requiring "remarkable patience". Describing the premise as "contrived", Matthew Peckham of PC Gamer found the addition of dinosaurs to be "mildly amusing", but their inclusion amounted to "cheap thrill" that did not fundamentally change the core gameplay. Tom Chick of GameSpot found the handling of dinosaurs "disappointing" and not "as visually or audibly rewarding as it could have been", citing the uninteresting animation of the dinosaurs, the superficial damage done by dinosaurs upon escape, and the redundant purpose of the Dinosaur Recovery Team when players are able to manually move escaped dinosaurs and replace broken fencing.
