= Zoo Tycoon 2 DS =

2008 video game

- North American box art
- Developer: Altron
- Publisher: THQ
- Director: Yoshihiro Tanaka
- Designer: Yoshihiro Tanaka
- Programmers: Yoshihiro Tanaka; Yohei Shimada; Takumi Mori
- Artists: Daisuke Nakano; Keiko Miyazawa; Katsuhiko Hayashi; Marika Tanimoto; Yuki Hagino; Kensaku Narada; Marehiko Kenmochi
- Composer: Tomoyoshi Sato
- Series: Zoo Tycoon
- Platform: Nintendo DS
- Release: 2008
- Genre: Business simulation game
- Modes: Single-player, multiplayer

Zoo Tycoon 2 DS is a Nintendo DS game based on the PC game Zoo Tycoon 2. It is the sequel to Zoo Tycoon DS.

== Gameplay ==
In Zoo Tycoon 2 DS, the player edits and builds the zoo in a main mode resembling the original Zoo Tycoon. Zookeeper mode is more like Zoo Tycoon 2 graphics-wise and has five mini-games: petting, cleaning animal waste, feeding, washing, and healing animals.

== Reception ==
Zoo Tycoon 2 DS received better reviews than its predecessor Zoo Tycoon DS, but nevertheless reception for the game was still mixed, with GameRankings and Metacritic reporting an average of 65.32% and 60/100 respectively. Randolph Ramsey, reviewing the game for GameSpot, criticized the simplistic gameplay, complaining that it had been "stripped of any complexity that you can literally use the same strategy for making all your critters happy regardless of their size, rarity, or temperament." although he did praise the game for including "comprehensive details about all the animals featured on its roster for any curious kiddies". Jack DeVries of IGN also detested the lack of challenge in the game. PocketGamer's Rob Hearn felt that it was "difficult to get excited about" the game, and he disproved of Zoo Tycoon 2 DS's "uncooperative" interface. All three reviewers were also unimpressed by the game's graphics with Ramsey calling the animal models "uniformly poor" and DeVries calling the game "not very pleasant on the eyes".
