= Common rock crab =

Common rock crab may refer to any of the following species of crab:

- Cancer irroratus
- Hemigrapsus sexdentatus
- Romaleon antennarium (formerly Cancer antennarius)

== See also ==
- Red rock crab (disambiguation)
