= Zoo Tycoon DS =

2005 video game

- Developer: Altron
- Publisher: THQ
- Director: Masahiro Horiguchi
- Designer: Yoshihiro Tanaka
- Programmers: Masahiro Horiguchi; Shogo Namekata
- Artists: Daisuke Nakano; Naoki Miyake; Hiroki Takahashi; Yusuke Sato; Kenta Kuraishi
- Composer: Tomoyoshi Sato
- Series: Zoo Tycoon
- Platform: Nintendo DS
- Release: NA: October 10, 2005; EU: November 11, 2005'
- Genre: Business simulation
- Mode: Single-player

Zoo Tycoon DS is a 2005 construction and management simulation game developed by Altron and published by THQ for the Nintendo DS. It is based on the PC game Zoo Tycoon. A sequel to the game, titled Zoo Tycoon 2 DS, was released in 2008.

== Gameplay ==
The graphics and gameplay are somewhat similar to the first Zoo Tycoon game, however, for the DS version, the terrain is in a grid format and does not blend smoothly with other terrain types like they do in the PC and Mac versions.

The objects and animals available in the game are also that of the first Zoo Tycoon game.

The game has two playing options, either tutorial/scenario or freeform. Tutorial/Scenario mode takes the player through many short games, each with a set goal, increasing in difficulty. Freeform lets players create a zoo free of time restrictions and goals. There are some limitations that the game has, such as not letting players to place incompatible animals into the same exhibit that can lead to predation and fighting, as well as animal attacks on guests and staff.

== Reception ==
Zoo Tycoon DS received mixed to poor reviews, with an average score of 44.96% on GameRankings and 44/100 on Metacritic, indicating "generally unfavorable reviews". Greg Mueller, reviewing Zoo Tycoon DS for GameSpot, disapproved of the game's graphics, criticizing how "Of all the 50 animals [in the game], only a few of them actually have distinct looks. You'll see the same brownish blob move around using the same two or three frames of animation over and over, which just doesn't look natural at all.". Muller also criticized the near-complete lack of music and sound effects, remarking "You could play this game on mute without missing anything. You might be deprived of the sweeping noise maintenance workers make, but you can just grab a broom and make the noise yourself, which, incidentally, would probably be about as much fun as playing this game". Dan Adams of IGN also strongly detested the game, despairingly opening up his review with the words, while sending himself death threats; "Please kill me. I just want to die. Zoo Tycoon DS has sucked the will to live out of my eyeballs and left me with nothing but cramped hands. ... I can't remember the last time I saw such an ugly game with so many deficiencies." The most positive review came from Nintendo Power, who praised the game for "faithfully reproducing the Zoo Tycoon experience" on the Nintendo DS.

Zoo Tycoon DS received a "Platinum" sales award from the Entertainment and Leisure Software Publishers Association (ELSPA), indicating sales of at least 300,000 copies in the United Kingdom.
