= Zoo Tycoon 2 =

2004 video game

- Developers: Blue Fang Games; Rapan
- Publisher: Microsoft Game Studios (Note: Mac OS X port developed and published by MacSoft)
- Series: Zoo Tycoon
- Engine: Gamebryo
- Platforms: Windows, Mac OS X
- Release: Windows: NA: November 9, 2004; EU: November 26, 2004; Mac OS X: NA: December 8, 2005
- Genre: Business simulation
- Mode: Single-player

Zoo Tycoon 2 is a business simulation video game developed by Blue Fang Games and published by Microsoft Game Studios and MacSoft. Originally released in 2004 for Microsoft Windows, Zoo Tycoon 2 is also available for Windows Mobile, PDA, and Mac OS X, although expansions are not included in the Mac version. A Nintendo DS version, titled Zoo Tycoon 2 DS, was released in 2008.

Similar to its predecessor, 2001's Zoo Tycoon, the objective is to build and operate a zoo by creating exhibits and aquariums, keeping guests and animals happy, and maintaining employees, finances, terrain, foliage, and scenery.

== Gameplay ==
The gameplay revolves around creating suitable exhibits for animals through habitat modifications (ground cover, water, elevation, foliage, and rocks, plus a variety of other items including food, shelters, and toys/enrichment items) which fulfill the animal's needs (habitat, hunger, thirst, stimulation, privacy, sleep, social, and exercise). Guests will visit the zoo to see the animals, and they also have needs that need to be fulfilled through scenery and buildings (hunger, thirst, bathroom, seating, and entertainment). They might stay several months in the zoo if they are satisfied, but quickly leave if they are unhappy.

Zoo Tycoon 2 features three gameplay modes: Campaign, Challenge, and Freeform. In Campaign mode, the player plays through scenarios in existing zoos and is assigned different objectives to complete, such as achieving a certain fame level, caring for rescued animals, or breeding endangered species. In Challenge mode, the player starts a zoo from scratch and is given random challenges which can be accepted or rejected. In both of these modes, players have limited money and start with limited access to animals and items, with more becoming available as zoo fame level increases. The last mode, Freeform, allows the player to create a zoo from scratch with unlimited money and access to all animals and items from the start.

== Development ==
After the success of the original Zoo Tycoon, a sequel was planned. Marketing materials showed an emphasis on 3D visuals as well as first-person perspective and photo modes. The game's first-person Guest Mode was added due to many fan requests to get "closer" to the animals. The Photo Mode and Zookeeper Mode were refined after developers decided that the player should be able to interact with the world while walking around. First-person movement and controls were based on first-person shooters, with developers citing Half-Life as an inspiration.

The game was also designed to be more freeform than Zoo Tycoon was, with developer Shawn Stone citing that habitat building in the first game was a formulaic process that was improved upon in the sequel. Terrain deformation and the Biome Brush were implemented to give the player more specific control over animal habitats by creating unique and individual exhibits, while still keeping them simple enough so as not to alienate players that were not as interested in the details of building an exhibit.

The development team noted the change in conservation messages portrayed by zoos after the release of Zoo Tycoon, and worked to make Zoo Tycoon 2 feel up to date with current information and messaging. Expansion packs were released for the game up to four years after its initial release, with designer Linda Currie citing the team working on three expansions simultaneously during development. Updated mechanics in each expansion required changes to be made to all animals, to ensure that each expansion pack would not break the game. The team worked to make changes without altering the core systems in place, in order to make updates and QA testing easier, and with lower risk.

== Marketing and promotion ==
Publisher Microsoft Game Studios ran several promotions involving the game, including a competition allowing kids to "Become a Zoo Keeper for the day" in the UK, and a competition to find "America's Favorite Zoo" in the US, an online vote which would result in a $25,000 grant from Microsoft to be put towards upkeep and maintenance. The contest consisted of three rounds, with the first round consisting of zoos being picked by a team of judges based on submitted press materials, which resulted in 15 semifinalists. Rounds two and three were done by fans in an online vote. In November 2004, the Tulsa Zoo was declared the winner of the polls, and was awarded the grant.

== Expansion packs ==
=== Endangered Species ===
On October 18, 2005, Microsoft released Zoo Tycoon 2: Endangered Species, the first expansion pack for the game. The expansion adds many new rare and endangered animal species, including the koala, gray wolf, Komodo dragon, scimitar-horned oryx, American bison, and orangutan, as well as a number of new forms of transportation, including sky trams, jeep tours, and elevated paths. The expansion also has a feature called "variant skins", which means that when the player adopts an animal, it may look different from normal members of its species (such as a white tiger and King Cheetah).

=== African Adventure ===
The second expansion pack, Zoo Tycoon 2: African Adventure, was released on May 16, 2006. It adds various new African animals such as the bongo, secretarybird, ratel, and meerkat, and allows the player to drive through exhibits with African-themed Jeep tours to get closer to them. The expansion pack also includes new maps based on well-known African locations, as well as new desert-themed buildings, lizard live food, and a new set of challenges and campaigns. The Jeep vehicle tours originally included in Endangered Species are featured prominently in this expansion, with the addition of the new Jeep Liberty.

=== Dino Danger Pack ===
The Dino Danger Pack was released as a premium download at the end of July 2006, meaning it could only be downloaded from the Zoo Tycoon website via credit card. It added four new extinct dinosaurs to the game: Tyrannosaurus, Triceratops, Carnotaurus, and Styracosaurus, as well as new objects to be used for them and a new campaign scenario. Following the release of Zoo Tycoon 2: Extinct Animals, which includes more updated versions of all of the animals included in the pack as well as additional content, Dino Danger was removed from the Zoo Tycoon website and can no longer be downloaded there. However, other sites still offer this pack.

=== Zookeeper Collection ===
The Zookeeper Collection was released on October 17, 2006. It includes the Endangered Species and African Adventure expansions as well as all animals and content from the base game.

=== Marine Mania ===
Released on October 17, 2006, Zoo Tycoon 2: Marine Mania features 20 new aquatic animals, new marine options, marine shows, and several other new gaming features. The expansion also includes marine plants, the ability to build tanks, animal shows, mini-games to teach behaviors to some of the marine animals, and four new aquatic biomes (reef, coastal, pelagic, and benthic), and new scenarios and challenges. Changes were made to the original method of biome layout, allowing the ability to toggle the visibility of rocks, flowers, and/or trees, as well as enhancing water effects and improving the way animals move through water in a 3D space, affecting the new animals included in the pack as well as various semi-aquatic animals from the base game such as Nile crocodiles and polar bears. New animals range from the giant whale sharks to the tiny rockhopper penguins.

=== Extinct Animals ===
A typical zoo in Extinct Animals, with Styracosaurus and a short-faced bear

Zoo Tycoon 2: Extinct Animals was released on October 17, 2007. It was the final expansion in the Zoo Tycoon series, with 34 adoptable animal species and one bonus species. The player can find fossils or get staff to find them. The player can then assemble the fossils, and can also create normal and "Super" extinct animals in an extinct research lab. The player can also stop rampaging dinosaurs by using the tranquilizer gun.

=== Ultimate Collection ===
Ultimate Collection contains the original game plus all four official expansions and a new menu theme exclusive to it, similar to Zoo Tycoon: Complete Collection. This title was released on September 30, 2008. Some users reported disk problems, whereby the third disk was the same as the second one. Microsoft sent free disk replacements at their support site.

Microsoft subsequently licensed the game to Ubisoft, who re-released the Ultimate Collection in a variety of formats across multiple territories including a single disk DVD-ROM for Windows PCs.

== Animal roster ==
=== Zoo Tycoon 2 ===
Common Name	Scientific Name	Biome	Notes
African Elephant	Loxodonta africana	Savannah	
American Beaver	Castor canadensis	Wetlands	
Bengal Tiger	Panthera tigris tigris	Tropical Rainforest	A leucistic skin variant is included in the Endangered Species expansion.
Black Rhinoceros	Diceros bicornis	Savannah	
Cheetah	Acinonyx jubatus	Savannah	
Chimpanzee	Pan troglodytes	Tropical Rainforest	
Common Peafowl	Pavo cristatus	Temperate Forest	
Common Ostrich	Struthio camelus australus	Savannah	
Common Zebra	Equus burchelli boehmi (now recognized as 'Equus quagga boehmi')	Savannah	
Dromedary Camel	Camelus dromedarius	Desert	
Emperor Penguin	Aptenodytes forsteri	Tundra	
Gemsbok	Oryx gazella	Scrub	
Giant Panda	Ailuropoda melanoleuca	Temperate Forest	
Greater Flamingo	Phoenicopterus ruber ruber (now recognized as 'Phoenicopterus roseus')	Wetlands	
Grizzly Bear	Ursus arctos horribilis	Boreal Forest	
Hippopotamus	Hippopotamus amphibius	Wetlands	
Ibex	Capra ibex	Alpine	
Jaguar	Panthera onca	Tropical Rainforest	
Lion	Panthera leo	Savannah	
Moose	Alces alces americana	Boreal Forest	
Mountain Gorilla	Gorilla gorilla beringei (now recognized as 'Gorilla beringei beringei')	Tropical Rainforest	
Nile Crocodile	Crocodylus niloticus niloticus (now recognized as just 'Crocodylus niloticus')	Wetlands	
Okapi	Okapia johnstoni	Tropical Rainforest	
Polar Bear	Ursus maritimus	Tundra	
Red Kangaroo	Macropus rufus (now recognized as 'Osphranter rufus')	Scrub	
Red Panda	Ailurus fulgens fulgens	Temperate Forest	
Reticulated Giraffe	Giraffa camelopardalis (now recognized as 'Giraffa reticulata')	Savannah	
Ring-Tailed Lemur	Lemur catta	Tropical Rainforest	
Snow Leopard	Uncia uncia (now recognized as 'Panthera uncia')	Alpine	
Thomson's Gazelle	Gazella thomsonii thomsonii (now recognized as 'Eudorcas thomsonii')	Savannah	

=== Downloadable Content ===
Common Name	Scientific Name	Biome	Notes
Addax	Addax nasomaculatus	Desert	In-game the Addax does not drink water out of bowls or troughs, instead being hydrated by the grass or hay the Addax eats. It is the only animal in the game with this feature.
Asian Elephant	Elephas maximus	Scrub	
Asiatic Black Bear	Ursus thibetanus	Temperate Forest	The Asiatic Black Bear was only obtainable by completing Photo objectives in the game Zoo Tycoon 2: Mobile, and was not included in the Ultimate Collection. This species has numerous bugs, having not being compatible with changes brought to later versions of the game; The Asiatic Black Bear cannot be hunted by large predators (Dinosaurs exclusively) and are unable to hunt smaller animals themselves, has no log for Family Trees, has no listed conservation status, among other things.
Black Leopard	Panthera pardus	Tropical Rainforest	This species is exclusively Melanistic in-game. In real life Black Leopards are just rare genetic variants of normal Leopards.
Musk Ox	Ovibos moschatus	Tundra	

The addon for the Black Leopard comes bundled with a Stuffed Prey Dummy enrichment item for predators, it resembles an Ungulate of some kind, possibly a deer.

=== Endangered Species ===
Common Name	Scientific Name	Biome	Notes
African Wild Dog	Lycaon pictus	Savanah	
American Bison	Bison bison	Grassland	
Baird's Tapir	Tapirus bairdii	Tropical Rainforest	
Black Crested Gibbon	Hylobates concolor (now recognized as 'Nomascus concolor')	Tropical Rainforest	
Caribou	Rangifer tarandus groenlandicus	Tundra	
Fennec Fox	Vulpes zerda	Desert	
Florida Panther	Puma concolor coryi (now recognized as 'Puma concolor couguar')	Wetlands	
Galapagos Giant Tortoise	Geochelone nigra porteri	Scrub	
Giant Sable Antelope	Hippotragus niger variani	Savannah	
Gray Wolf	Canis lupus lycaon (now recognized as Canis lycaon')	Boreal Forest	
Javan Rhinoceros	Rhinoceros sondaicus	Tropical Rainforest	
Koala	Phascolarctos cinereus	Temperate Forest	
Komodo Dragon	Varanus komodoensis	Scrub	
Markhor	Capra falconeri	Alpine	
Orangutan	Pongo pygmaeus	Tropical Rainforest	
Przewalski's Wild Horse	Equus ferus przewalskii	Grassland	
Scimitar-horned Oryx	Oryx dammah	Desert	
Spanish Lynx	Lynx pardinus	Temperate Forest	
Spectacled Bear	Tremarctos ornatus	Temperate Forest	
Wolverine	Gulo gulo	Boreal Forest	

=== African Adventure ===
Common Name	Scientific Name	Biome	Notes
Aardvark	Orycteropus afer	Scrub	
African Buffalo	Syncerus caffer	Wetlands	
African Spurred Tortoise	Centrochelys sulcata	Desert	
Barbary Ape	Macaca sylvanus	Temperate Forest	
Bongo	Tragelaphus eurycerus	Tropical Rainforest	
Caracal	Caracal caracal	Scrub	
Common Warthog	Phacochoerus africanus aethiopicus	Savannah	
Ethiopian Wolf	Canis simensis	Alpine	
Gelada	Theropithecus gelada	Alpine	
Gerenuk	Litocranius walleri	Scrub	
Live Food Lizard	No assigned species	N/A	The Live Food Lizard is used as an enrichment item for Terrestrial Predatory animals. Unlike the Marine Mania expansions Live Food Cod and Tuna, it's unclear what specific species the Live Food Lizard represents, if any true real life analogue exists at all.
Mandrill	Mandrillus sphinx	Tropical Rainforest	
Masai Giraffe	Giraffa camelopardalis tippelskirchi (now recognized as 'Giraffa tippelskirchi')	Savannah	Masai Giraffe can reproduce with Reticulated Giraffe.
Meerkat	Suricata suricatta	Scrub	
Nile Monitor	Varanus niloticus	Wetlands	
Pygmy Hippopotamus	Hexaprotodon liberiensis heslopi (now recognized as 'Choeropsis liberiensis heslopi'	Tropical Rainforest	
Ratel	Mellivora capensis	Grassland	
Secretary Bird	Sagittarius serpentarius	Grassland	
Striped Hyena	Hyaena hyaena	Desert	
White Rhinoceros	Ceratotherium simum	Scrub	
Wildebeest	Connochaetes taurinus	Savannah	

=== Marine Mania ===
Common Name	Scientific Name	Notes	
Arctic Cod	Arctogadus glacialis	N/A	Arctic Cod in Zoo Tycoon 2 are Live Food, used for enrichment of predatory aquatic species.
Beluga	Delphinapterus leucas	Tundra	
Blacktip Reef Shark	Carcharhinus melanopterus	Reef	
Blue Marlin	Makaira nigricans	Pelagic	
California Sea Lion	Zalophus californianus	Coastal	
Common Bottlenose Dolphin	Tursiops truncatus	Coastal	
False Killer Whale	Pseudorca crassidens	Coastal	
Goblin Shark	Mitsukurina owstoni	Benthic	
Green Sea Turtle	Chelonia mydas	Coastal	
Koi	Cyprinus sp.	N/A	Koi in Zoo Tycoon 2 are solely decorative, they are limited to swimming along the surface of the water they reside in, they also disappear after a short time like ambient species.
Leatherback Sea Turtle	Dermochelys coriacea	Pelagic	
Narwhal	Monodon monoceros	Tundra	
Manta Ray	Manta birostris (now recognized as 'Mobula birostris')	Reef	
Orca	Orcinus orca	Tundra	
Pacific Walrus	Odobenus rosmarus divergens	Tundra	
Rockhopper Penguin	Eudyptes chrysocome	Coastal	
Scalloped Hammerhead Shark	Sphyrna lewini	Pelagic	
Sea Otter	Enhydra lutris	Coastal	
Short-Finned Pilot Whale	Globicephala macrorhynchus	Pelagic	
West Indian Manatee	Trichechus manatus	Coastal	
Whale Shark	Rhincodon typus	Pelagic	
White Shark	Carcharodon carcharias	Benthic	
Yellowfin Tuna	Thunnus albacares	N/A	Yellowfin Tuna in Zoo Tycoon 2 are Live Food, used for enrichment of large predatory aquatic species. Live Prey Yellowfin Tuna is only obtainable after completing two Marine Mania challenges, in the Challenge mode.

Marine Mania includes Seal Prey Dummy enrichment item for aquatic predators, it resembles an earless seal. There is also an attraction in the game, the Blue Whale Hall, a to-scale building designed like a whale for guests to walk through, the hallway plays peaceful music with whale songs, featuring info graphics for the virtual guests.

=== Dino Danger & Extinct Animals ===
Common Name	Scientific Name	Biome	Notes
American Mastodon	Mammut americanum	Boreal Forest	
Ankylosaurus	Ankylosaurus magniventris	Wetlands	
Aurochs	Bos primigenius	Temperate Forest	
Bluebuck	Hippotragus leucophaeus	Grassland	
Bush-antlered deer	Eucladoceros dicranios	Temperate Forest	
Carnotaurus	Carnotaurus sastrei	Boreal Forest	First included in the Dino Danger Pack PDLC, Carnotaurus was later redesigned and included in Extinct Animals.
Cave lion	Panthera leo spelaea (now recognized as 'Panthera spelaea')	Alpine	
Deinonychus	Deinonychus antirrhopus	Tropical Rainforest	
Deinosuchus	Deinosuchus hatcheri	Tropical Rainforest	
Dimetrodon	Dimetrodon angelensis	Wetlands	
Diprotodon	Diprotodon optatum	Wetlands	
Dodo	Raphus cucullatus	Tropical Rainforest	
Doedicurus	Doedicurus clavicaudatus	Scrub	
Dwarf Sicilian Elephant	Palaeoloxodon falconeri	Grassland	
Elephant Bird	Aepyornis maximus	Wetlands	
Giant Camel	Titanotylopus spatulus	Grassland	
Giant Ground Sloth	Megatherium americanum	Scrub	
Giant warthog	Metridiochoerus andrewsi	Savannah	
Gigantopithecus	Gigantopithecus blacki	Tropical Rainforest	
Kentrosaurus	Stegosaurus kentrosaurus (recognized as 'Kentrosaurus aethiopicus')	Wetlands	The scientific name in Zoo Tycoon 2's zoopedia appears to be a typo, Kentrosaurus has never been a part of the genus Stegosaurus.
Killer Penguin	"Eudyptes omnicidus"	Tundra	Killer Penguins are a joke species created as a reference to a glitch from Zoo Tycoon (2001) where Emperor Penguins could kill any other species in the game. Killer Penguins are listed as being from the island of Madagascar possibly in reference to the animated film. Killer Penguins in Zoo Tycoon 2 are the most difficult species to maintain in the game, and are obtained by chance, either being mysteriously donated to your zoo, or are created by a failure to synthesize an extinct species.
Protarchaeopteryx	Protarchaeopteryx robusta	Wetlands	
Quagga	Equus quagga (now recognized as 'Equus quagga quagga')	Savannah	The Quagga is only obtainable in Zoo Tycoon 2 by releasing at least one member of each Extinct species in the game into the wild. Quagga can reproduce with Common Zebra.
Sabre-Toothed Cat	Smilodon fatalis	Boreal Forest	Leucistic and Melanistic skin variants are included in the game.
Short-Faced Bear	Arctodus simus	Tundra	
Sivatherium	Sivatherium maurusium	Savannah	
Stegosaurus	Stegosaurus stenops	Boreal Forest	
Stokesosaurus	Stokesosaurus clevelandi	Boreal Forest	
Styracosaurus	Styracosaurus albertensis	Tropical Rainforest	First included in the Dino Danger Pack PDLC. Received a redesign for Extinct Animals.
Thylacine	Thylacinus cynocephalus	Temperate Forest	
Triceratops	Triceratops horridus	Boreal Forest	First included in the Dino Danger Pack PDLC.
Tyrannosaurus rex	Tyrannosaurus rex	Temperate Forest	First included in the Dino Danger Pack PDLC. Received a redesign for Extinct Animals.
Utahraptor	Utahraptor ostrommaysi	Boreal Forest	
Velociraptor	Velociraptor mongoliensis	Desert	
Warrah	Dusicyon australis	Grassland	
Woolly Rhinoceros	Coelodonta antiquitatis	Tundra	

Dino Danger includes a Dinosaur Prey Dummy enrichment item for large predatory dinosaurs, which resembles a sauropod dinosaur, along with several new enrichment items designed to make animals feel more comfortable in their enclosures, such as tar pits and glaciers. There are also multiple references to cavemen throughout the Extinct Animals expansion, with cavemen taking the place of staff members in the extinct-themed buildings. Additionally, there is a large cave-like tunnel for guests to walk through, and the walls of the cave feature cave art of the various species added in the expansion, accompanied by drum music. There is also an in game statue of various silhouettes' of Holocene species from the expansion lined up for size comparison, also featuring the Caveman.

Extinct Animals also includes a playground feature, the Play Dig Pit, where young zoo guests can dig up various fossils and place them in an Extinct Education Center, where they are displayed as oversized fossil mounts. Guests can build skeletons of the Imperial Mammoth, Irish Elk, Pteranodon and Tyrannosaurus rex.

=== Animal Houses & Exhibits ===
Building	Exhibit Species	Instalment
Aquarium with Jellyfish	Blue jellyfish and Red-orange jellyfish	Zoo Tycoon 2: Marine Mania (2006)
Aquarium with Octopus	Octopus	Zoo Tycoon 2: Marine Mania (2006)
Aquarium with Tropical fish	Blue fish, Lemon Tropical Fish and Little Red Fish	Zoo Tycoon 2: Marine Mania (2006)
Insect House	Desert Scorpions, Hercules Beetle and Tarantula	Zoo Tycoon 2 (2004)
Touch Pool	Horseshoe Crab, Sea Cucumber, Sea Star and Conch	Zoo Tycoon 2: Marine Mania (2006)
Reptile House	King Cobra, Panther Chameleon and Red-Eared Slider	Zoo Tycoon 2 (2004)

=== Ambient Species ===
Common Name	Scientific Name	Biome	Instalment
Arctic Tern	Sterna paradisaea	Tundra	Zoo Tycoon 2: Endangered Species (2005)
Atlantic Mackerel	Scomber scombrus	Coastal & Pelagic	Zoo Tycoon 2: Marine Mania (2006)
Blenny	Etheostoma sp.	Benthic, Coastal & Reef	Zoo Tycoon 2: Marine Mania (2006)
Macaw	Ara ararauna	Tropical Rainforest	Zoo Tycoon 2 (2004)
Capelin	Mallotus villosus	Coastal, Pelagic & Tundra	Zoo Tycoon 2: Marine Mania (2006)
Common Crow	Corvus brachyrhynchos	Scrub & Temperate Forest	Zoo Tycoon 2: Endangered Species (2005)
Common Loon	Gavia immer	Alpine & Boreal Forest	Zoo Tycoon 2 (2004)
Gull	Larus sp.	Grassland	Zoo Tycoon 2 (2004)
Herring	Clupea sp.	Coastal, Pelagic, Tundra & Wetlands	Zoo Tycoon 2: Marine Mania (2006)
King Vulture	Sarcoramphus papa	Desert, Savannah & Scrub	Zoo Tycoon 2 (2004)
Laughing Kookaburra	Dacelo novaeguineae	Scrub & Temperate Forest	Zoo Tycoon 2: Endangered Species (2005)
Mallard Duck	Anas platyrhynchos	Wetlands	Zoo Tycoon 2 (2004)
Monarch Butterfly	Danaus plexippus	Alpine, Boreal Forest, Grassland & Temperate	Zoo Tycoon 2 (2004)
Moon Jellyfish	Aurelia aurita	Coastal & Reef	Zoo Tycoon 2: Marine Mania (2006)
North American Bullfrog	Lithobates catesbeianus	Wetlands	Zoo Tycoon 2: Endangered Species (2005)
Lionfish	Pterois sp.	Coastal & Reef	Zoo Tycoon 2: Marine Mania (2006)
Oxpecker	Savannah	Buphagus africanus	Zoo Tycoon 2 (2004)
Pigeon	Columba livia sp.	Grassland	Zoo Tycoon 2 (2004)
Powder Blue Tang	Acanthurus leucosternon	Reef	Zoo Tycoon 2: Marine Mania (2006)
Remora	N/A	Coastal, Pelagic & Reef	Zoo Tycoon 2: Marine Mania (2006)
Rock Crab	N/A	Benthic & Coastal	Zoo Tycoon 2: Marine Mania (2006)
Springhare	Pedetes capensis	Desert	Zoo Tycoon 2 (2004)
Spadefish	Chaetodipterus sp.	Benthic & Coastal	Zoo Tycoon 2: Marine Mania (2006)
Squirrel	N/A	Boreal Forest, Temperate Forest & Grassland (Marine Mania)	Zoo Tycoon 2 (2004)
Toco Toucan	Ramphastos toco	Tropical Rainforest	Zoo Tycoon 2: Endangered Species (2005)

== Campaign scenarios ==
This is a list of campaigns and their scenarios. All campaigns in Zoo Tycoon 2, including all four expansion packs, contain a total of 45 scenarios. If you include the tutorials, which are also found in the game's campaign menu, there are a total of 60 scenarios.

=== Base game ===
Zoo Tycoon 2 Tutorials
Scenario Name	Description	Difficulty
Tutorial 1: Control	Start learning the basics of camera controls in Zoo Tycoon 2 with this guided tutorial. Then move on to construction techniques and more!	Easy
Tutorial 2: Construction	Start learning the basics of construction in Zoo Tycoon 2 with this guided tutorial. Then move on to general information techniques and more!	Easy
Tutorial 3: Getting Information	Learn the basics of getting information about your zoo with this guided tutorial. After this, you'll be all set to create your own zoo in Freeform Mode, take on Challenge Mode, or start a Campaign in Campaign Mode.	Easy

These tutorials are to help beginners adapt to the mechanics of the game.

Zookeeper in Training
Scenario Name	Description	Difficulty
New Animal Arrivals	You have a great opportunity to take over a small zoo, but you need to prove that you understand that animals have individual biome needs. Make sure each animal is moved into its appropriate biome exhibit area and you run your new zoo for one month.	Easy
Start-up Zoo	There are a number of steps to creating a thriving zoo for the animals and for the guests. In your start-up zoo, you'll need to take things one step at a time to build your facility into a popular destination spot. Complete all scenarios in this campaign to unlock the flowerpost!	Easy
Beyond Start-up	With the experience you've gained creating a new start-up, the next step is to transition into a successful growth facility. Expand on this basic zoo to obtain growth in zoo fame, and guest traffic. A final measure of your success will come from donations obtained in your zoo. Complete all scenarios in this campaign to unlock the flowerpost!	Normal

Completing all scenarios in this campaign unlocks the Flowerpost scenery object.

Troubled Zoos
Scenario Name	Description	Difficulty
Waltham Animal Park Redevelopment Plan	MSPA officials have found conditions in the Waltham Animal Park to be in violation of animal welfare standards. Use money from the Blue Fang Development Fund to take the park from a dilapidated facility to a successful venture! Complete all scenarios in this campaign to unlock the flower arch!	Normal
Raintree Cooperative Animal Park	The Blue Fang Development Fund has learned of a facility in severe need of help! Use the funds available to improve the conditions for the animals at the park and create a prosperous environment for future growth. Complete all scenarios in this campaign to unlock the flower arch!	Normal
Wolverton Animal Rehabilitation Center	Illness runs rampant at the Wolverton Animal Rehabilitation Center and funds are at an all-time low. Restore good health to the facility to eliminate the bad press surrounding the animals' illnesses. Complete all scenarios in this campaign to unlock the flower arch!	Normal

Completing all scenarios in this campaign unlocks the Flower Arch scenery object.

Prevent Animal Abuse
Scenario Name	Description	Difficulty
African Elephant Rescue	A group of African elephants was scheduled to be culled in the Kingdom of Sironjia because of elephant overpopulation. Instead, they have been offered to the zoo that creates the best and most suitable habitat for the animals.	Easy
Combatting Cruelty	A series of animal abuse complaints brought against an unnamed facility have initiated an official investigation and resulted in groups of animals being removed from the zoo. Care for these mistreated animals in your facility.	Normal
Smuggling Ring Exposed	Authorities have exposed an international smuggling ring that was illegally trading endangered animals. Many animals have been recovered and are desperate for suitable homes. If you act fast, several endangered animals can be yours.	Hard

Completing all scenarios in this campaign unlocks the Sundial Statue object.

The Globe
Scenario Name	Description	Difficulty
The World's Biomes	The geography department of a major university has funded a massive biome project to create a facility where the major biomes of the world are represented. You have the task to create such an environment.	Normal
African Animal Empire	A wealthy landowner would like to create an animal park featuring animals only from Africa. It must contain at least 12 different species. You can use any animal to get the zoo going, but animals from other regions must be released to the wild for the park to be considered complete.	Normal
North American Foreign Content	A prominent zoo would like to open a new sister facility to feature an exhibit area focused on North American species. However, due to regulations, these species must represent less than 30% of the animals on exhibit. Create a new zoo so that you can display the required species and fall within regulations. Complete all scenarios in this campaign to unlock the globe statue!	Hard
Scarce Asian Animals	The Board of Directors of your zoo has mandated that four Asian species be obtained within one year. Unfortunately, animals from Asia are in short supply! Do what it takes to increase your zoo's reputation so that you can acquire these rare creatures.	Hard

Completing all scenarios in this campaign unlocks the Globe Statue object.

Conservation Programs
Scenario Name	Description	Difficulty
Animal Adoption Program	Captive breeding is a strong indication of a zoo's ongoing commitment to wildlife conservation. Develop an active, thriving breeding and adoption program so that you can offer animals to other facilities.	Normal
Animal Conservation	The birth of any baby animal is a momentous occasion, but the captive breeding of an endangered species is an important, proactive way to ensure species survival. Do your part to encourage the reproduction of several endangered species.	Normal
Second-Generation Animals	Few facilities can boast that they have successfully bred second-generation animals. You have been added to a list of the select few who can make this claim. Your fame in the world of zoos is certain to be widespread, and the births of your animal additions have made headlines around the world. In recognition of your achievement, you have unlocked The Mysterious Panda campaign!	Normal

Completing all scenarios in this campaign unlocks The Mysterious Panda campaign.

The Mysterious Panda
Scenario Name	Description	Difficulty
The Mysterious Panda	One of the most recognizable animals in the world, the giant panda is also one of the most endangered. Only zoos with exceptional reputations are even considered as recipients for giant panda adoptions. Will yours be one of them? Complete all scenarios in this campaign to unlock the gilded panda statue!	Hard

Completing this scenario unlocks the Gilded Panda Statue.

=== African Adventure ===
African Adventure Tutorial
Scenario Name	Description	Difficulty
Jeep® Vehicles	Learn how to place Jeep® vehicle stations and roads and how to ride Jeep vehicles in first-person mode!	Easy

The tutorial introduce the player to a new feature included in the expansion pack that has already existed in Endangered Species: Jeep® Vehicles.

African Adventure
Scenario Name	Description	Difficulty
A Mob of Meerkats	Your zoo has some new arrivals: mischievous meerkats. Can you care for these small, highly social creatures?	Normal
The Secretary Bird	Can you capture the behaviors of this long-legged predator on film?	Normal
The African Diversity Zoo	You've been hired to create a zoo containing 14 African species, but only four of the species can be savannah animals.	Hard

Completing all scenarios in this campaign unlocks the Desert Themed buildings and objects.

=== Endangered Species ===
Endangered Species Tutorials
Scenario Name	Description	Difficulty
Tutorial 1: Elevated Paths	Learn about elevated paths, endangered species, and conservation areas in your zoo!	Easy
Tutorial 2: Sky Trams	Learn how to create sky tram tours and place tour objects!	Easy
Tutorial 3: Jeep® Vehicles	Learn how to place Jeep® vehicle stations and roads and how to ride Jeep vehicles in first-person mode!	Easy

These tutorials introduce the players to the new features added in the expansion pack: elevated paths, sky trams and jeep vehicles.

Transportation
Scenario Name	Description	Difficulty
Bridging the Gap	Can you build a zoo that contains 16 different animal species? There's only one catch--there's a chasm in your way!	Normal
The Great Savannah	Use sky trams and elevated paths to showcase savannah wildlife! Build a successful zoo without disturbing a protected conservation area.	Normal
Five-Star Sensation	An old established zoo is having trouble maintaining its popularity. Use all of your transportation know-how to transform the zoo into a five-star sensation!	Hard

Completing all scenarios in this campaign unlocks the Decorated Tour Gate.

Photo Safari
Scenario Name	Description	Difficulty
The VIPs	Test your photography skills by taking pictures of both ordinary guests and special VIP guests.	Normal
The Javan Rhinoceros	Use your camera to document the mysterious, critically endangered Javan rhino. There's just one catch--you can't get too close!	Hard
The Cat Sanctuary	Transform a small sanctuary for big cats into a successful zoo--and practice your photography skills along the way!	Hard

Completing all scenarios in this campaign unlocks the Cat Climber enrichment object.

Endangered Species
Scenario Name	Description	Difficulty
Baird's Tapir	A local town has built a small zoo around a pair of endangered Baird's tapirs. Can you build a colony of tapirs while raising donations and protecting the tapirs' environment at the same time?	Normal
Endangered Species Breeding Program	Help save endangered species by breeding three different endangered animals and then releasing them to the wild.	Normal
The Endangered Species Zoo	Can you complete the ultimate endangered species challenge? Create a 5-star zoo containing nothing but endangered species!	Hard

Completing all scenarios in this campaign unlocks the Conservation Breeding Center.

=== Marine Mania ===
Marine Mania Tutorials
Scenario Name	Description	Difficulty
Tutorial 1: Tank Construction Basics	Learn the basics of building an exhibit tank for marine animals.	Easy
Tutorial 2: Hybrid Tank Construction	Learn how to create hybrid exhibits that combine land and water.	Easy
Tutorial 3: Training Animals	Learn how to train show animals to perform tricks.	Easy
Tutorial 4: Creating Shows	Learn how to create and schedule marine shows.	Easy
Tutorial 5: Marine Mania Features	Learn about many of the game's new and improved features.	Easy

These tutorials introduce players to two new elements implemented in Marine Mania: Tank and Marine Shows. Players will learn how to construct a full tank and a hybrid tank, training show animals, hosting a marine show, as well as the improvements of the game made according to the players' feedback prior to the release of the expansion pack.

Marine Animals
Scenario Name	Description	Difficulty
The Marine Diversity Zoo	Create a zoo that contains species from five major classes and orders of large marine animal.	Easy
Take the Plunge	Obtain 10 different marine animal species to transform a small zoo into a bustling, beautiful marine park.	Normal
The Oceans' Biomes	A billionaire hired you to create a zoo with each of the major marine biomes represented.	Normal
Arluq the Orca	Raise an orca orphaned after a mass stranding.	Hard

Completing all scenarios in this campaign unlocks the Blue Whale Hall.

Marine Shows
Scenario Name	Description	Difficulty
Marine Show Photographer	Explore the world of marine shows by taking exciting show photos!	Normal
Starmaker	Transform an untrained young dolphin into a marine show star!	Normal
Double Feature	What's better than a zoo with a great marine show? A zoo with two marine shows!	Normal
Fine-Tuning	You were hired to liven up a sleepy little marine show. Can you create a 3-star hit show and dazzle your guests?	Normal
Marine Show Mogul	Create a 5-star marine show -- it's the ultimate test of showmanship!	Hard

Completing all scenarios in this campaign unlocks the Upgraded Show Platform.

=== Extinct Animals ===
Extinct Animals Tutorials
Scenario Name	Description	Difficulty
Extinct Research Lab Tutorial	Learn about all the exciting features of the new Extinct Research Lab!	Easy
Dealing with Dinos Tutorial	Walk through a dino rampage drill, learn how to stop a rampaging dino, and hear all about the Dino Capture Team!	Easy
Education and Entertainment	Learn about the Extinct Education Center, two new staff members, and special climate-enhancing objects!	Easy

These tutorials will teach players on how to: find fossils, clone extinct species, research cure for diseases, as well as dealing with dinosaurs that are going on a rampage.

Extinct Animals
Scenario Name	Description	Difficulty
Paleo Island	Paleo Island needs your help! Acquire extinct animals and prepare them for their release into the wild.	Easy
All in a Day's Work	Running a zoo with extinct species in it presents many challenges. Think you can handle it?	Normal
Back to the Ice Age	The mayor wants to renovate and expand the city zoo to attract and educate the city's children. The zoo needs your help building a new Ice Age exhibition.	Normal

Completing all scenarios in this campaign unlocks the Extinct Themed buildings and objects.

Extinct Exploration
Scenario Name	Description	Difficulty
The Hard Way	There are no more extinct animals to adopt! There's only one way to give your guests what they want. Time to get your hands dirty!	Normal
Living in Harmony	Bringing back extinct animals presents a unique challenge for your zoo. Can you operate a zoo where extinct species live side-by-side with your more common animals?	Normal
T. rex Trouble	The curator at your sister zoo has an urgent request. They have a T. rex, but it's rampaging so often, they closed their zoo. They hope you can help by providing another T. rex as a companion.	Hard

Completing all scenarios in this campaign unlocks the Brachiosaurus Slide playground object.

The Dinosaur Zoo
Scenario Name	Description	Difficulty
The Dinosaur Zoo	Acquire a mighty Tyrannosaurus rex to save your struggling zoo.	Normal

Originally included in Dino Danger Pack, this single scenario comes with Extinct Animals as well.

=== Challenge mode unlockables ===
In addition to Campaign rewards, players can unlock themed content for use in future zoos by completing tasks in Challenge mode:

- Completing five game challenges unlocks the Safari Themed buildings and objects.
- Completing five photo challenges unlocks the Jungle Themed buildings and objects.

== Biomes ==
There are 10 biomes, with 4 additional ones being introduced in Zoo Tycoon 2: Marine Mania:

- Alpine
- Boreal forest
- Desert
- Grassland
- Savannah
- Scrub
- Temperate forest
- Tropical rainforest
- Tundra
- Wetlands

=== Marine Mania Biomes ===
- Benthic
- Coastal
- Pelagic
- Reef

== Reception ==
Reception

Aggregate score
Aggregator	Score
Metacritic	72/100

Review scores
Publication	Score
Eurogamer	7/10
GameRevolution	2/5
GameSpot	7.2/10
GameSpy	3.5/5
IGN	7.5/10

Award
Publication	Award
8th Annual Interactive Achievement Awards	D.I.C.E. Award for Family Game of the Year

According to The NPD Group, Zoo Tycoon 2 was the 19th best-selling computer game of 2004. It rose to 13th place on NPD's annual computer game sales chart for 2005, a position it maintained for 2006.

The game received generally positive reviews. IGN gave the game a score of 7.5/10, praising the game's lasting appeal while criticizing it for being too easy, while GameSpy noted the improved 3D graphics.

Zoo Tycoon 2 received a "Silver" sales award from the Entertainment and Leisure Software Publishers Association (ELSPA), indicating sales of at least 100,000 copies in the United Kingdom.

During the 8th Annual Interactive Achievement Awards, the Academy of Interactive Arts & Sciences awarded Zoo Tycoon 2 with "Computer Family Game of the Year". The game also received a nomination for "Outstanding Character Performance - Female" for Linda Currie's work on the game. At the following year's awards ceremony, the expansion Endangered Species received a nomination for "Outstanding Achievement in Gameplay Engineering.

=== Reboot ===
A reboot of the franchise, simply titled Zoo Tycoon and developed by Frontier Developments, was released in 2013 for the Xbox 360 and Xbox One consoles. An enhanced edition titled Zoo Tycoon: Ultimate Animal Collection was released in 2017 for the Xbox One and Windows 10. Zoo Tycoon 2 was cited as a major influence, and Frontier Developments hoped the game would be a homage to the previous game, while enhancing the core experience. The entry was met with mixed reviews, with many citing the loss of customizability compared to the previous games.

=== Cancelled sequel ===
After the success of Zoo Tycoon 2, preliminary design work was started on a third game. The game was canceled as the company shifted direction away from PC development and towards mobile and social games. Former Blue Fang Games designer Shawn Stone stated that he sees the influence of and many ideas from the scrapped Zoo Tycoon 3 in the franchise's spiritual successor Planet Zoo.
