= Zoo Tycoon =

- Genres: Construction and management simulator, business simulator
- Developers: Blue Fang Games, Frontier Developments, Behaviour Interactive, Asobo Studio
- Publisher: Microsoft Studios
- Platforms: Microsoft Windows, OS X, Xbox One, Xbox 360, Windows Phone, Nintendo DS
- First release: Zoo Tycoon; October 17, 2001
- Latest release: Zoo Tycoon: Ultimate Animal Collection; October 31, 2017

Zoo Tycoon is a series of business simulation video games in which the player is tasked with building and running a successful zoo. The series was initially developed by Blue Fang Games and published by Microsoft Studios who later in 2001–2008 went on to create two stand-alone video games and seven expansion packs for PC and Macintosh platforms. In 2013, Microsoft Studios released a new Zoo Tycoon game, developed by Frontier Developments for Xbox One and Xbox 360. An enhanced version of the Xbox game, Zoo Tycoon: Ultimate Animal Collection, was released for Windows 10 and the Xbox One on October 31, 2017. Frontier Developments, the developer of the final Zoo Tycoon game, released the spiritual successor to the series, Planet Zoo, in 2019.

== Gameplay ==
Zoo Tycoon is a zoo simulation video game putting the player in control of their own fictional zoo business. The gameplay formula introduced in the original Zoo Tycoon in 2001 received updates throughout the series, but its theme and main motifs remain unchanged: players must build, expand, and/or upgrade a zoo by purchasing animals, creating suitable animal habitats, and allocating staff and resources for animal maintenance and care. As the ultimate goal of the game is to earn revenue, players must also provide for visitors by building food/drink stands, sanitary facilities, picnic areas, and an aesthetically pleasing environment. Higher revenue is generated by keeping both animals and visitors happy. If the animals are released from their enclosure, they can kill the visitors.

Zoo Tycoon features four modes: Training, Scenario, Challenge, and Freestyle. The Scenario mode puts players in control of a preset scenario in which they have to accomplish multiple objectives within a time period. New items are unlocked as the scenario progresses. The Challenge mode, first introduced in Zoo Tycoon 2, resembles the Scenario mode in that the player is in a preset scenario with limited funds and must accomplish certain goals. It differs in that this mode is not progressive. The Freestyle mode differs in each game, but usually leaves the player free to build a zoo from scratch however they see fit.

== Games ==
=== Zoo Tycoon (2001) ===
Zoo Tycoon was developed by Blue Fang Games and released in 2001, in 2002 the studio released two expansion packs: Dinosaur Digs and Marine Mania. Within a year, Zoo Tycoon had sold over 1 million units, reaching the top-selling status on the software charts. Also, a free Endangered Species download was available from Microsoft.com. In 2003, Zoo Tycoon: Complete Collection was released which included all content available for the game, the base game, expansion packs, and the downloadable content from the Microsoft website.

=== Zoo Tycoon 2 (2004) ===
Zoo Tycoon 2 was developed by Blue Fang Games, and released in 2004. in the following year the first expansion pack, Endangered Species was released in 2005. The African Adventure and Marine Mania were released the following year in 2006. Also available as a premium download was the Dino Danger Pack, available for purchase from the Zoo Tycoon website. The last expansion pack to be released for the game was Extinct Animals which released in 2007.

Zoo Tycoon 2 also released with two bundles, Zookeeper Collection was a bundle which included the base game, the Endangered Species, and the African Adventure expansions in one pack.

The Ultimate Collection however, was a bundle which included the base game and all of its expansions.

=== Zoo Tycoon (2013) ===
Microsoft released a Zoo Tycoon game for Xbox One and Xbox 360 in 2013 as an Xbox One Launch Title.

Microsoft announced a remaster of the 2013 game, Zoo Tycoon: Ultimate Animal Collection, for Windows 10 and the Xbox One on August 20, 2017. It features 4K resolution, HDR and 60 FPS support on Xbox One X. In addition to improved graphics and gameplay, new animals such as kangaroos, koalas, and cougars were included. It was released on October 31, 2017. There are multiple campaigns and challenges with animals from across the globe.

=== Handheld and mobile editions ===
In addition to the main series, there are several handheld and mobile games. Zoo Tycoon DS (2005) and Zoo Tycoon 2 DS (2008). Zoo Tycoon 2 and its expansion Marine Mania are both available for the mobile phone. With the exception of Zoo Tycoon 2 DS, none of these games were developed by Blue Fang Games. Zoo Tycoon: Friends was a free-to-play title developed by Behaviour Interactive, released in 2014. In April 2015, Microsoft permanently shut down Zoo Tycoon: Friends servers due to technical problems.

=== Board game ===
Zoo Tycoon: The Board Game started its Kickstarter in October 2022 and eventually released in September 2023.

== See also ==
- Zoo Empire
- Wildlife Park
- Planet Zoo
