= Thorn =

Thorn(s) or The Thorn(s) may refer to:

== Botany ==
- Thorns, spines, and prickles, sharp structures on plants
- Crataegus monogyna, or common hawthorn, a plant species

== Comics and literature ==
- Rose and Thorn, a DC Comics character
- Thorn (Marvel Comics), a fictional character from Marvel Comics
- Thorn (Inheritance), a dragon from the Inheritance cycle
- Thorns (novel), a 1967 science fiction novel by Robert Silverberg
- Thorn, a 1982–1986 comic strip by Jeff Smith
- Thorn Harvestar, a main character in Jeff Smith's Bone series
- "The Thorn", a poem by William Wordsworth in Lyrical Ballads, 1798
- Thorn, a fictional character in the Wings of Fire series

== Companies, organisations and teams ==
- Thorn (organization), a surveillance software vendor and anti-human-trafficking organization
- Thorn Electrical Industries, an electrical engineering business
- Thorn EMI, a major British company involved in consumer electronics, music, defence and retail
- Thorn Lighting, luminaire manufacturer, part of Zumtobel Lighting Group
- Portland Thorns FC, a NWSL soccer team based in Portland, Oregon, US

== Film and television ==
- The Thorn (film), a 1974 American comedy film
- The Thorns (TV series), a 1988 American sitcom
- Thorn, a member of the Hex Girls

== Individuals ==
- Thorn (dog), a WWII rescue dog, later a canine actor
- Thorn (surname), list of people and fictional characters so named

== Linguistics ==
- Thorn (letter) (Þ, þ), a letter of the Old English and Icelandic alphabets
- Thorn (rune) (ᚦ), or Thurisaz, a rune of the Old English fuþorc

== Music ==
=== Performers ===
- Thorns (band), a Norwegian black metal band
- The Thorns (band), an American acoustic rock band

=== Albums ===
- Thorn (album), by Tang Dynasty, 2013
- Thorns (Beans album), 2007
- Thorns (Icon & The Black Roses album), 2014
- Thorns (Thorns album), 2001
- Thorns (Tony Martin album), 2022
- The Thorns (album), by the Thorns, 2003

=== EPs ===
- The Thorn (EP), by Siouxsie and the Banshees, 1984
- Thorn, an EP by Enslaved, 2011
- Thorns, an EP by Luke Black, 2015

=== Songs ===
- "Thorn", by Blind Guardian from Nightfall in Middle-Earth, 1998
- "Thorn", by My Bloody Valentine from You Made Me Realise, 1988
- "Thorn", by Underoath from Voyeurist, 2022
- "Thorns", by Demon Hunter from Storm the Gates of Hell, 2007
- "Thorns", by Phinehas from The Fire Itself, 2021
- "Thorns", by Sylosis from A Sign of Things to Come, 2023

== Places ==
=== Europe ===
- Thorn, Bedfordshire, England
- Thorn, Netherlands
- Toruń (German: Thorn), Poland

=== United States ===
- Whitethorn, California (formerly Thorn)
- Thorn, Mississippi
- Thorn Creek, a stream in Will County, Illinois
- Thorn Lake (disambiguation), bodies of water in Oregon and Wisconsin

== Other uses ==
- Thorn Ring (Deltarune), a video game item in Deltarune's alternate route.

== See also ==
- Thorn tree (disambiguation)
- Thorne (disambiguation)
- Thorens (disambiguation)
