= Torne =

Torne may refer to:

- River Torne (England), a river in South Yorkshire and Lincolnshire, England
- Torne (Finnish and Swedish river), a river in Finland and Sweden
- PlayTV#Torne, a Japanese PlayStation 3 accessory

== See also ==
- Thorne (disambiguation)
