= PlayStation Digital Television Peripherals and DVR Software =

HDTV/DVR add-on unit for the PlayStation 3

Sony has produced digital television tuner peripherals and digital video recorder applications for the PlayStation family of consoles, with each accessory utilising digital television standards that are exclusive to specific regions.

== PlayTV ==
PlayTV

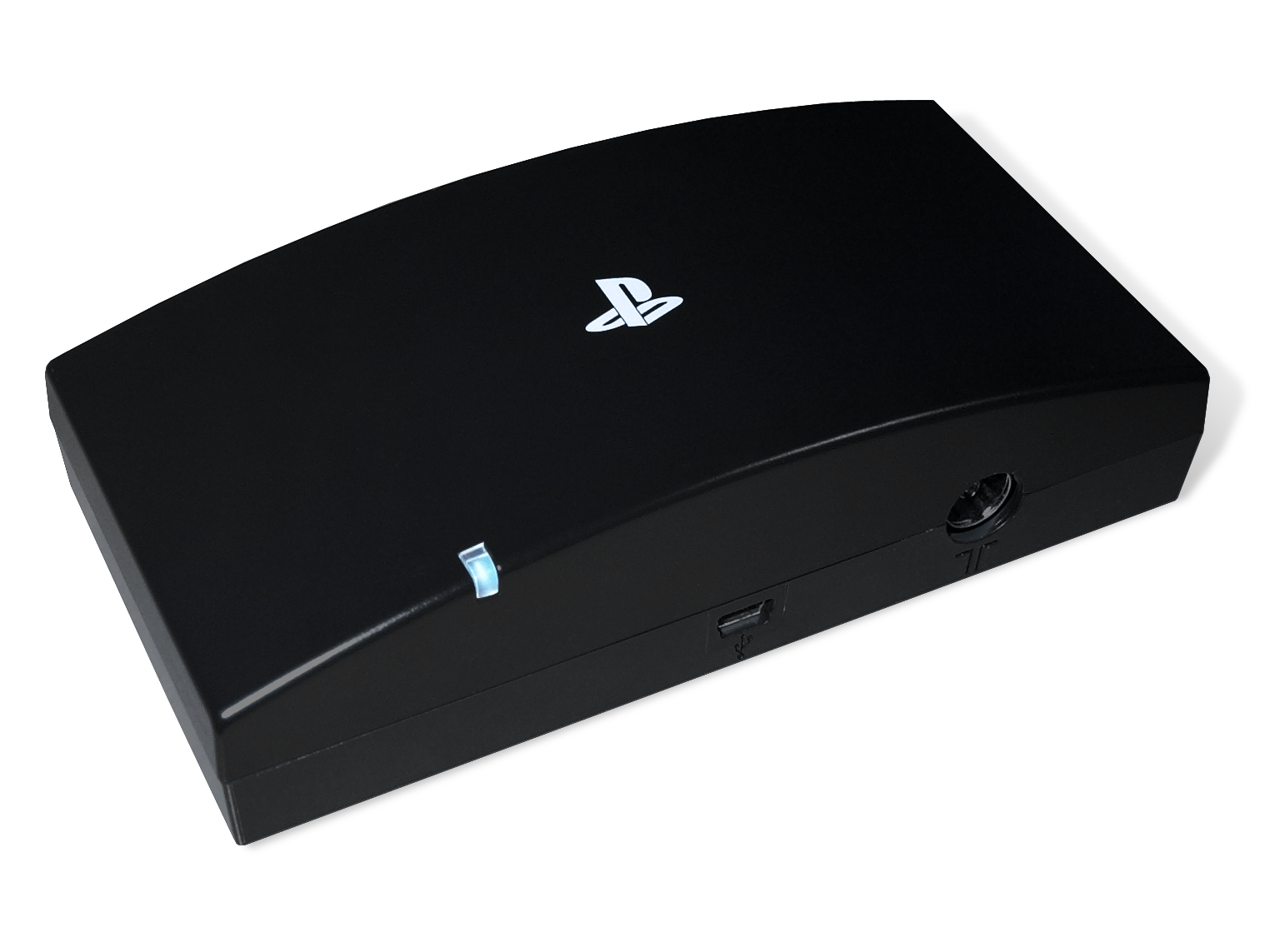
- PlayTV tuner device
- Manufacturer: Sony Computer Entertainment
- Type: DVB-T tuner, Digital video recorder
- Generation: Seventh generation era
- Released: EU: September–December 2008 (UK: 19 September 2008); AU: 26 November 2009; NZ: 25 November 2010
- Storage: Hard disk (via PS3)
- Controller input: PlayStation controller, BD Remote, Sony PSP system or Sony VAIO using Remote Play
- Connectivity: USB 2.0 (Mini-B connector); 75 Ω Coaxial (TV aerial plug)

=== Features ===
LiveTV

The Live TV feature of PlayTV provides access to free-to-air (unencrypted) channels through the DVB-T network. Users are able to pause, rewind, and fast forward through any recently viewed material, as well as record and toggle subtitles and audio descriptions. PlayTV allows users to watch one program while recording another. The Live TV feature includes a "now" and "next" bar that enables users to scroll through live TV and see what is on other channels and what will be coming up next. The live programming is cached as it is displayed.

Guide (Electronic Programme Guide)

All recorded content is stored in the PlayTV Library, which offers a list or thumbnail view and is sortable by date, channel, or name. Content in the library can be exported to the PlayStation 3's main menu and stored alongside the user's other video files. During playback of recorded content, users have the ability to pause, fast forward, rewind, skip, and turn subtitles and audio descriptions on or off. The screen size can also be adjusted.

Library

The PlayTV Library is where all of the recorded content is stored. Content can be viewed in a ListView or a thumbnail view. It is sortable by date, channel, and name. Content in the library can also be exported to the PlayStation 3's main menu and stored with the rest of the user's video files.

Schedule

The schedule feature allows users to edit their future recordings. It is searchable.

Find and Record

The Find and Record feature allows users to search the next seven days worth of TV programmes. Find and Record lets users set manual recordings using the channel, date, and time.

Mobile TV with PSP

Wi-Fi connectivity with a PlayStation Portable allows for portable viewing of live or recorded television programming. By using the Remote Play feature of the PlayStation 3, owners can use a PlayStation Portable to access their PlayStation 3 console via the internet. The Remote Play feature also has the ability to 'wake up' the PlayStation 3 from standby mode.

The Sony Ericsson Aino mobile phone can link up to a PlayStation 3 and uses Remote Play which allows users to watch PlayTV on their phone.

Manuals

PlayTV can display an on-screen manual. The manual can be used as a quick reference to the various functions of a controller, Blu-ray remote control, and Remote Play using a PlayStation Portable.

Settings and other features

- Turn Subtitles on and off
- Turn Audio Description on and off
- Set whether you would like live TV to always be recorded or only when paused for trick mode.
- Screen Size settings
- Gameplay recordings on and off (See below)
- Parental Lock
- HDD Size: PlayTV can only record to the PlayStation 3's own internal hard drive. Recorded videos can then be transferred to an external storage device in some regions.
- Codecs: PlayTV supports MPEG2 SD. AVC/MPEG4 is available with the latest PS3 firmware update. (UK manual only states MPEG2 in the supported codecs under technical specs)
- Twin DVB-T tuners (one dedicated to recording, the other to live viewing). Tuners are HDTV capable in areas with HD DVB-T broadcasts.
- PlayTV can be controlled using a PlayStation controller or Blu-ray remote control.
- Antenna input only. No antenna output.

Sony previously stated that PlayTV would be able to record TV while playing PS3 and PS1 games, the code for the function has already been incorporated in the version 2.41 firmware update. To use the product however a 5GB install is required from the disc provided with the PlayTV device.

Sony has stated that PlayTV is incompatible with the UK Freeview HD, as it uses the DVB-T2 standard.

=== Release ===
On 12 September 2008, Sony released an interactive demo of PlayTV on the PlayStation Store in Europe. The device was launched in the UK, Germany, Italy, Spain and France on 19 September 2008 with other regions in Europe following. First week shipments of PlayTV in the UK were reportedly 85,000 units, apparently with "specialist and national press giving thumbs up to the device."

Australia and New Zealand were originally to receive the PlayTV accessory 2 months after Europe but it was delayed until 26 November 2009 in Australia along with an HD software update. In New Zealand the device was pushed back further to a release date of 25 November 2010. The update underwent testing in both countries due to the wide availability of HD channels and use of common broadcast codecs (MPEG 2/MPEG 4).

PlayTV is only capable of tuning DVB-T broadcasts, so is not available in regions which do not use DVB-T. A similar accessory known as Torne was made available in March 2010 in Japan, for use with their ISDB-T broadcast system. There were seemingly never plans to release PlayTV or a similar device for use with North American NTSC/ATSC broadcasts, though the PlayStation Vue OTT streaming service was available through PS3 consoles prior to its shutdown in January 2020, and carried local channels in certain areas.

=== Software updates ===
Software updates are available via the About section in Settings using the "Game Update Check" Functionality (when using the original PlayTV software). In recent versions of PlayTV software, a Software Update function is available directly from the main PlayTV menu. A further update was announced on 2 April 2009 that will include new volume and search controls, upscaling of standard definition (SD) content and faster access to TV shows from the XMB menu system.

In February 2009 another update was released, which provided improvements to standard definition upscaling.

On 23 August 2010, details of a new update (version 2.01) were revealed. While part of the update is free, an unlock key must be purchased from the PlayStation Store in order to access some of the features (listed below). The update was released on 17 November 2010.

The following additional services are offered with the 2.01 update:

- Series Link – Allows recording of an entire series. (UK Only)
- Chat TV – Allows texting with other users while watching.
- Recommendations – Allows recommendation of shows to other users via Facebook.
- Community favourites – Lets you see what your friends and the PSN Community are watching. (Not available in Australia)
- Premium 7-day EPG – Electronic Programme Guide. (Standard PlayTV programme guide only in Australia)
- Search by actor, director and genre.

On 6 December 2010, another update, version 2.02, was released. Multiple users complained that since the update the PlayTV software became unstable, with the most commonly reported symptom being the software hanging on the PlayTV launch screen and not proceeding any further.

On 3 March 2011, bugfix update 2.03 was released.

On 23 May 2013, version 2.04 was released.

=== Linux and Windows ===
The device can be used in Linux since 2.6.30. It also can be used in Windows by patching the USB IDs in the driver of a card with the same dibcom hardware (such as the Pinnacle PCTV Dual DVB-T Diversity Stick). It can be used in both 32- and 64-bit versions of Windows using this method. There are believed to be two hardware variants of the device, using the ULI chipset.

In Linux or Windows, PlayTV can handle AVC/MPEG4 HD broadcasts which are used in Ireland and continental Europe. The UK has adopted DVB-T2 for terrestrial high-definition TV broadcasts, so the PlayTV will not give PS3 owners access to those TV channels.

An unofficial Windows application (in Spanish language only) allows users to edit the file channel_ps3.bin and customize the order of channels in the PlayTV software (a function not normally available). A PlayStation Jailbreak device is required in order to transfer the file from PS3 to PC.

== Torne ==
Torne
- Developer: Sony Interactive Entertainment
- Publisher: Sony Interactive Entertainment
- Platforms: PlayStation 3; PlayStation 4; PlayStation 5; PlayStation Vita; PlayStation TV; iOS; iPadOS; Android
- Release: PlayStation 3: JP: 18 March 2010; PlayStation Vita: JP: 20 December 2012; PlayStation TV: JP: 14 November 2013; PlayStation 4: JP: 10 June 2014; Torne Mobile (iOS/iPadOS/Android): JP: 18 March 2015; PlayStation 5: JP: 24 November 2021

Torne (トルネ, Torune) is a digital television and digital video recorder application developed by Sony Computer Entertainment for the PlayStation family of consoles. It was first released exclusively in Japan in 2010 on the PlayStation 3 and has since been made available on later PlayStation consoles, including the PlayStation Vita, PlayStation 4, and PlayStation 5, as well as mobile devices.

It was initially released as a digital television recorder kit for the PlayStation 3, which included the Torne installation disc and the PS3 Digital Terrestrial Tuner. From 2012 onwards, Sony's Nasne network recorder and media storage device replaced the tuner and included the Torne software (PS3 version only), with the application itself later made available as a standalone download.

=== Features ===
The application allows users to watch record and playback live TV

it is capable of recording and playing back live TV, even while in a game or playing other media (e.g., a DVD or Blu-ray Disc) and can be accessed on PSP via remote play (PS3 Version only).

The PS3 version of Torne features trophy support.

=== Software Updates ===
In June 2010 Sony released Torne software version 2.00, which enables MPEG-4 AVC compression, allowing recordings to be compressed down to a third of their original size as captured MPEG-2 streams. It will also add the ability to watch, fast-forward and rewind programs while they are still recording and to update the user's PSN status.

== PS3 Digital Terrestrial Tuner ==
PS3 Digital Terrestrial Tuner
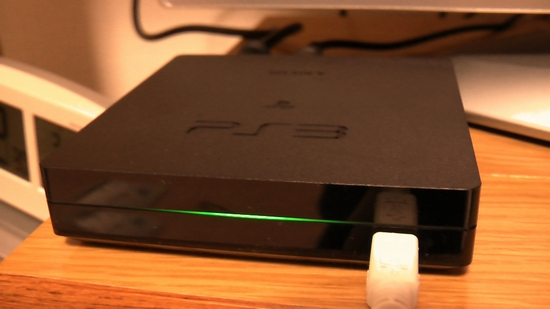
- PS3 Digital Terrestrial Tuner (CECH-ZD1J).
- Manufacturer: Sony Computer Entertainment
- Type: Peripheral, ISDB-T tuner, Digital video recorder
- Generation: Seventh generation era
- Released: JP: 10 March 2010
- Discontinued: July 2014
- Storage: Hard disk (via PS3)
- Connectivity: USB 2.0 (Mini-B connector)
- Successor: Nasne

The PS3 Digital Terrestrial Tuner is a USB digital television tuner peripheral developed by Sony Computer Entertainment for use with the PlayStation 3. Released exclusively in Japan in 2010 alongside the Torne software.

The device enables the console to receive and record digital terrestrial television broadcasts compliant with the ISDB-T standard. It connects via USB and works in conjunction with the Torne application to provide features such as programme scheduling, time-shift playback, and recording to the PS3's internal hard drive or an external storage device. The tuner was later superseded by the Nasne networked recorder.

The tuner can only be used with the PlayStation 3 version of Torne
