= Thorens (disambiguation) =

Thorens is a. manufacturer of high-end audio equipment.

Thorens may also refer to:

- Thorens-Glières, a former commune in Haute-Savoie, France
- Château de Thorens, a castle in Thorens-Glières, Haute-Savoie, France
- Pointe de Thorens, a mountain of Savoie, France
- Val Thorens, a ski resort in Savoie, French Alps
- Adèle Thorens Goumaz (born 1971), Swiss politician

== See also ==
- Thorns (disambiguation)
