= Thorne =

Thorne may refer to:

== Places ==
=== Antarctica ===
- Mount Thorne

=== Canada ===
- Thorne, Ontario, Canada
- Thorne, Quebec, Canada

=== England ===
- Thorne, Cornwall, England
- Thorne, Ottery St Mary, an historic estate in Devon
- Thorne, a hamlet and historic manor in the parish of Holsworthy Hamlets in Devon
- Thorne Coffin, Somerset
- Thorne, South Yorkshire
  - Thorne Colliery

=== United States ===
- Thorne, North Dakota, an unincorporated community in the United States
- Thorne, Nevada

== Other ==
- Thorne (surname), a list of people named Thorne
- Thorne (TV series), a 2010 crime drama starring David Morrissey
- Thorne system, a modern system of plant taxonomy

== See also ==
- Thorn (disambiguation)
- Torne (disambiguation)
