= PlayStation 3 =

Home video game console by Sony

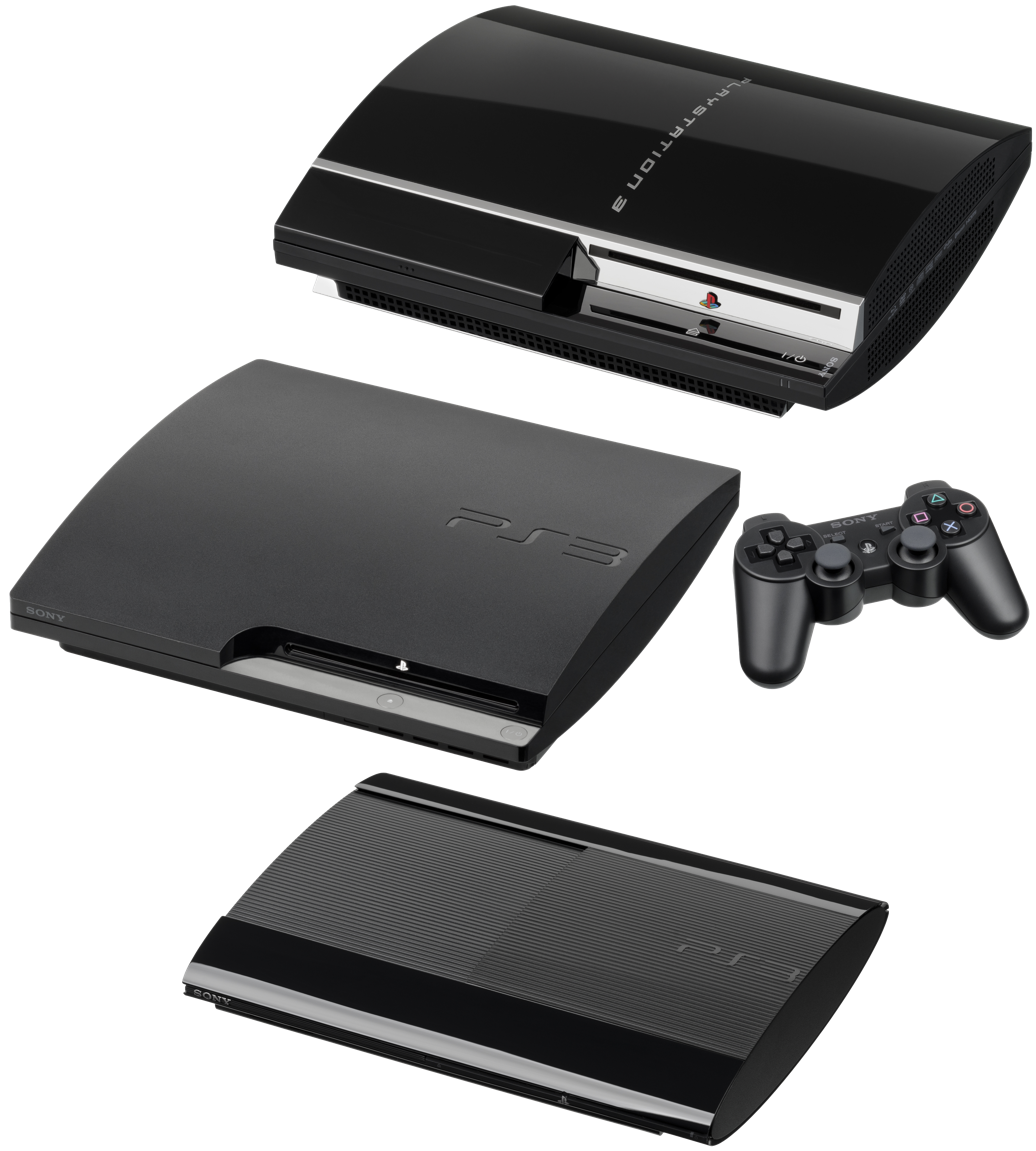
- Top: Original PlayStation 3 (2006); Center: PlayStation 3 Slim (2009); Bottom: PlayStation 3 Super Slim (2012)
- Also known as: PS3
- Developer: Sony Computer Entertainment
- Manufacturer: Sony, Foxconn, Asus
- Product family: PlayStation
- Type: Home video game console
- Generation: Seventh
- Released: JP: November 11, 2006; NA: November 17, 2006; PAL: March 23, 2007
- Introductory price: 20 GB: US$499.99 / ¥49,980; 60 GB: US$599.99 / ¥60,000 / €599.99
- Discontinued: PAL: March 2016; NA: October 2016; JP: May 29, 2017
- Units shipped: 87.4 million
- Media: Blu-ray; DVD; CD; Super Audio CD (some models); Digital distribution
- Operating system: PlayStation 3 system software
- CPU: Cell Broadband Engine @ 3.2 GHz
- Memory: 256 MB XDR DRAM (system); 256 MB GDDR3 SDRAM (graphics)
- Storage: 20‍–‍500 GB hard disk or 16 GB eMMC
- Display: 480i, 480p, 576i, 576p, 720p, 1080i, 1080p
- Graphics: RSX Reality Synthesizer @ 500 MHz
- Sound: Audio output formats: AV Multi: (2ch); Analog stereo Optical audio: (2ch, 5.1ch); AAC; Dolby Digital; DTS; Linear PCM (44.1 kHz, 48 kHz, 88 kHz, 176.4 kHz) HDMI: (2ch, 5.1ch, 7.1ch); AAC; Dolby Digital; Dolby Digital Plus; Dolby TrueHD*; DTS; DTS-HD High Resolution Audio; DTS-HD Master Audio*; Linear PCM (44.1 kHz, 48 kHz, 88 kHz, 96 kHz, 176.4 kHz, 192 kHz) *All models can decode Dolby TrueHD and DTS-HD Master Audio to be output as Linear PCM. Only "Slim" models can output the raw stream.
- Controller input: Sixaxis, DualShock 3, PlayStation Move, Blu-ray Remote and others
- Connectivity: (details): Audio/video output; AV Multi port (with stereo audio); Component; Composite; D-Terminal; SCART; S-Video; HDMI 1.4 (Note: Initially used HDMI 1.3a specification, but was upgraded (via firmware update) to 1.4 to support stereoscopic 3D for gaming and Blu-ray video playback. The PlayStation 3 does not support any other HDMI 1.4 capabilities.); Optical audio Networking; Gigabit Ethernet (10BASE-T, 100BASE-TX, 1000BASE-T) × 1; Wi-Fi (802.11b/g)***; Bluetooth 2.0 Inputs/outputs; USB 2.0 × 2 (4 on original model) Flash card readers**; Memory Stick; SD/MMC; CompactFlash; ** Some original models; *** Except 20 GB model
- Online services: PlayStation Network
- Dimensions: Original: Width: 325 mm (12.8 in); Height: 98 mm (3.9 in); Depth: 274 mm (10.8 in) Slim: Width: 290 mm (11 in); Height: 65 mm (2.6 in); Depth: 290 mm (11 in) Super Slim: Width: 290 mm (11 in); Height: 60 mm (2.4 in); Depth: 230 mm (9.1 in)
- Best-selling game: Grand Theft Auto V (29.52 million) (list)
- Backward compatibility: PlayStation; PlayStation 2 (some models)
- Predecessor: PlayStation 2
- Successor: PlayStation 4
- Website: playstation.com/en-us/explore/ps3/ at the Wayback Machine (archived 2015-01-13)

The PlayStation 3 (PS3) is a home video game console developed and marketed by Sony Computer Entertainment (SCE). It is the successor to the PlayStation 2, and both are part of the PlayStation line of consoles. The PS3 was first released on November 11, 2006, in Japan, followed by November 17th in North America and March 23, 2007, in Europe and Australasia. It competed primarily with Microsoft's Xbox 360 and Nintendo's Wii as part of the seventh generation of video game consoles.

The PlayStation 3 was built around the custom-designed Cell Broadband Engine processor (often simply called the cell processor), co-developed with IBM and Toshiba. SCE president Ken Kutaragi envisioned the console as a supercomputer for the living room, capable of handling complex multimedia tasks. It was the first console to use the Blu-ray disc as its primary storage medium, the first to be equipped with an HDMI port, and the first capable of outputting games in 1080p (Full HD) resolution. It also launched alongside the PlayStation Network online service and supported Remote Play connectivity with the PlayStation Portable and PlayStation Vita handheld consoles. In September 2009, Sony released the PlayStation 3 Slim, which introduced a smaller, more energy-efficient design. A further revision, the Super Slim, was released in late 2012, offering additional refinements to the console's form factor.

At launch, the PS3 received a mixed reception, largely due to its high price—US$599 (equivalent to $960 in 2025) for the 60 GB model and $499 (equivalent to $800 in 2025) for the 20 GB model—as well as its complex system architecture and limited selection of launch titles. The hardware was also costly to produce, and Sony sold the console at a significant loss for several years. However, the PS3 was praised for its technological ambition and support for Blu-ray, which helped Sony establish the format as the dominant standard over HD DVD. Reception improved over time, aided by a library of critically acclaimed games, the Slim and Super Slim hardware revisions that reduced manufacturing costs, and multiple price reductions. These factors helped the console recover commercially. Ultimately, the PS3 sold approximately 87.4 million units worldwide, narrowly surpassing the Xbox 360 and becoming the eighth best-selling console of all time. As of early 2019, nearly 1 billion PlayStation 3 games had been sold worldwide.

The PlayStation 4 was released in November 2013 as the PS3's successor. Sony began phasing out the PlayStation 3 within two years. (Note: On September 29, 2015, Sony confirmed that sales of the PlayStation 3 were to be discontinued in New Zealand, but the system remained in production in other markets.) Shipments ended in most regions by 2016, (Note: Shipments of new units to Europe and Australia ended in March 2016, followed by North America which ended in October 2016.) with final production continuing for the Japanese market until May 29, 2017.

== History ==
Development of the PlayStation 3 began on March 9, 2001, when Sony Computer Entertainment president Ken Kutaragi announced a partnership with Toshiba and IBM to develop the Cell microprocessor. Around the same time, Shuhei Yoshida led a team focused on exploring next-generation game development. By early 2005, Sony shifted its focus toward preparing PS3 launch titles.

In September 2004, Sony confirmed that the PlayStation 3 would use Blu-ray as its primary media format, with support for DVDs and CDs. Nvidia was announced as the partner for the console's graphics processing unit in December 2004. The PS3 was officially unveiled on May 16, 2005, at E3, alongside a prototype of the Sixaxis controller featuring a boomerang-shaped design. No working hardware was present at E3 or at the Tokyo Game Show in September, though demonstrations such as Metal Gear Solid 4: Guns of the Patriots were shown running on software development kits and comparable PC hardware. Sony also showcased concept footage based on projected system specifications, including a tech demo of Final Fantasy VII.

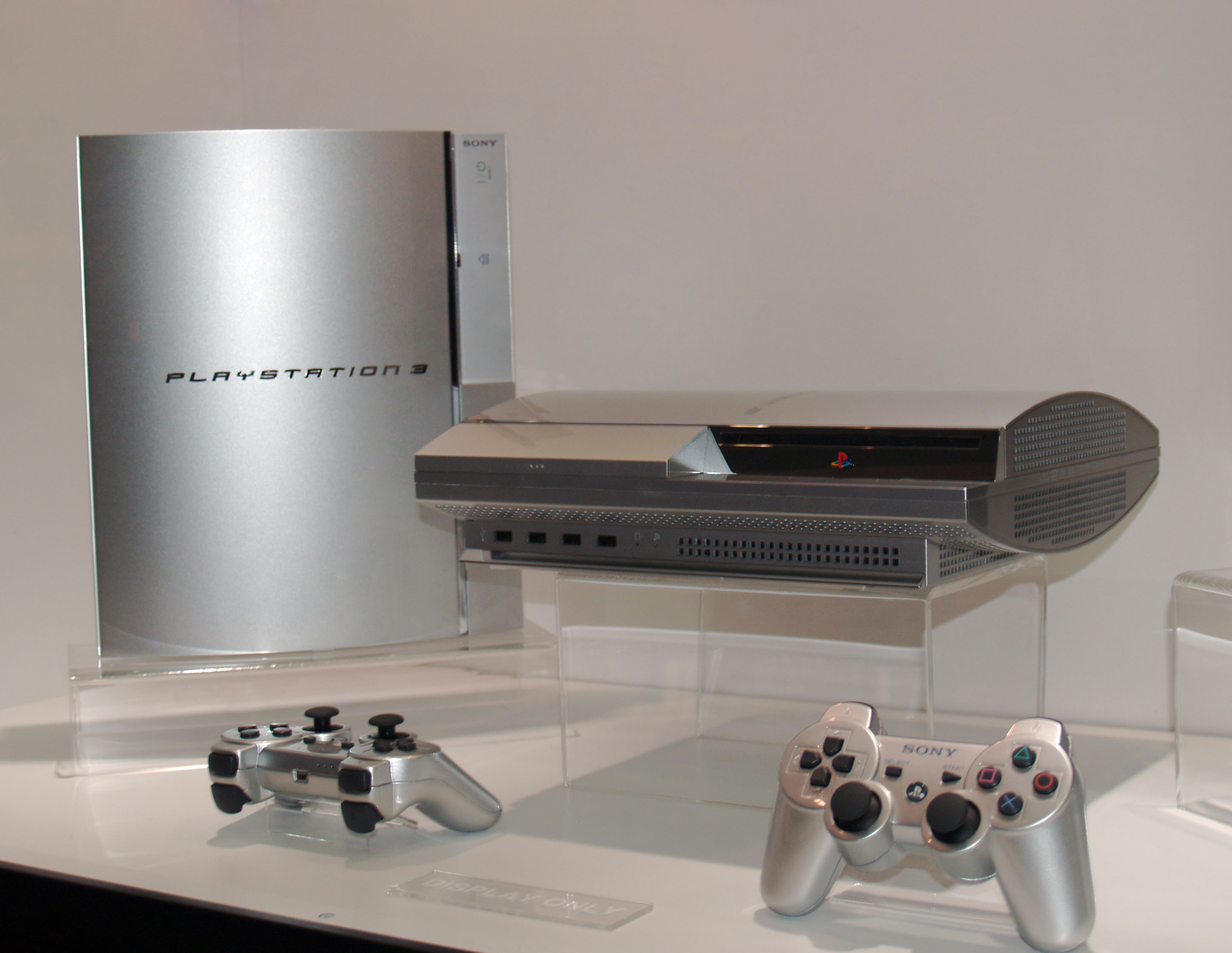
Prototype PlayStation 3 on display at E3 2006

The 2005 prototype included two HDMI ports, three Ethernet ports and six USB ports, but by E3 2006, these had been reduced to one HDMI, one Ethernet, and four USB ports to cut costs. Sony also announced two launch models: a 60 GB version at US$599.99 / ¥60,000 / €599.99 and a 20 GB version at US$499.99 / ¥49,980 / €499.99. To further reduce costs, the 60 GB model was to be the only configuration to feature HDMI output, Wi-Fi, flash card readers and chrome trim. It was scheduled to launch on November 11, 2006, in Japan and November 17, 2006, in North America and Europe.

On September 6, 2006, Sony delayed the PAL region launch to March 2007 due to a shortage of Blu-ray drive components, and announced it would not sell the 20 GB model in the region. Later that month at the Tokyo Game Show, Sony confirmed that it had decided to include HDMI output on the 20 GB model. The Japanese launch price for the 20 GB model was also reduced by more than 20%, while the 60 GB model would be sold under an open pricing scheme. Sony showcased 27 playable titles running on final PS3 hardware at the event.

Despite the cost-cutting efforts, the PS3 would still be sold at a loss due to high component costs, including the GPU (estimated at US$129) and Blu-ray Disc drive (estimated at US$125). The 20 GB model was estimated to cost US$805.85 to manufacture, about US$307 more than its retail price, while the 60 GB model was estimated at US$840.35, or US$241 above its retail price. Subsidizing the hardware contributed to SCE reporting an operating loss of ¥232 billion (approximately US$1.91 billion) for the fiscal year following the launch of the PS3. Sony later acknowledged cumulative losses of about US$3.3 billion on the PS3 hardware through mid‑2008.

=== Launch ===
The PlayStation 3 was first released in Japan on November 11, 2006, selling over 81,000 units within 24 hours. It launched in North America on November 17, where demand was high and incidents of violence were reported at retail locations. The console was released the same day in Hong Kong and Taiwan.

The console launched in Europe, Australia, and other PAL regions on March 23, 2007. It sold 600,000 units across Europe in its first two days, with 165,000 sold in the UK, making it the region's fastest-selling home console at the time. Sales dropped sharply in the following weeks, with some retailers citing high price points and early cancellations.

The PS3 launched in other markets throughout 2007, including Singapore (March 7), India (April 27), Mexico (April), and South Korea (June 16). Sony often hosted promotional events or offered bundled content in these regions to drive interest.

=== Slim model ===
Following months of speculation, Sony officially unveiled the "Slim" hardware revision (model CECH-2000) on August 18, 2009, during its Gamescom press conference, and it was released in major territories by September 2009. This model featured a significantly slimmer and lighter chassis, reduced power consumption, and a quieter cooling system. These improvements were made possible in part by transitioning to smaller fabrication processes for the system's CPU and GPU. The manufacturing changes reportedly reduced production costs by about 70 percent. Nevertheless, due to the console's simultaneous price reduction to US$299, Sony was still estimated to be losing around US$37 per unit at launch, with losses per unit reduced to approximately US$18 by early 2010.

=== Super Slim model ===
Sony announced the "Super Slim" hardware revision (model CECH-4000) in September 2012, which launched in major markets later that year. Compared to the previous "Slim" model, the new chassis was approximately 20 percent smaller and 25 percent lighter, featured reduced power consumption, and replaced the slot-loading disc drive with a top-loading drive, changes that further lowered manufacturing costs. While the redesigned disc mechanism helped cut costs and save space, reviewers criticized it as feeling cheap and described it as "ultimately a step back". The Super Slim was offered with larger 250 GB and 500 GB hard drives, as well as a low-cost model featuring 16 GB of eMMC flash storage, with the option to install a hard drive later.

== Games ==
PlayStation 3 launched in North America with 14 titles, with Resistance: Fall of Man emerging as the top seller. The game received critical acclaim and was named PS3 Game of the Year by both GameSpot and IGN. Some anticipated titles, such as The Elder Scrolls IV: Oblivion and F.E.A.R., missed the launch window and arrived in early 2007. In Japan, Ridge Racer 7 led launch sales, while the European launch featured 24 titles, including MotorStorm and Virtua Fighter 5. MotorStorm and Resistance: Fall of Man became the platform's most successful titles of 2007, and each received sequels.

At E3 2007, Sony showcased its upcoming first-party lineup including Uncharted: Drake's Fortune, Ratchet & Clank Future: Tools of Destruction, and Warhawk, along with future titles such as Killzone 2, LittleBigPlanet, and Gran Turismo 5 Prologue. Key third-party games such as Metal Gear Solid 4: Guns of the Patriots, Assassin's Creed, Call of Duty 4: Modern Warfare, and Grand Theft Auto IV also helped drive platform momentum.

Sony introduced stereoscopic 3D support to PS3 via firmware updates beginning in 2010. The technology was first demonstrated in the January 2009 Consumer Electronics Show, with Wipeout HD and Gran Turismo 5 Prologue used to show how the technology would work. Firmware update 3.30 enabled 3D gaming, while 3.50 added support for 3D movie playback.

As of early 2019, nearly 1 billion PS3 games had been sold worldwide. The platform's best-selling titles include Grand Theft Auto V, (Note: Of the 90 million total units sold by April 2018, 32.8% of that total were for the PlayStation 3 version.) Gran Turismo 5, The Last of Us, and the Uncharted franchise.

== Hardware ==
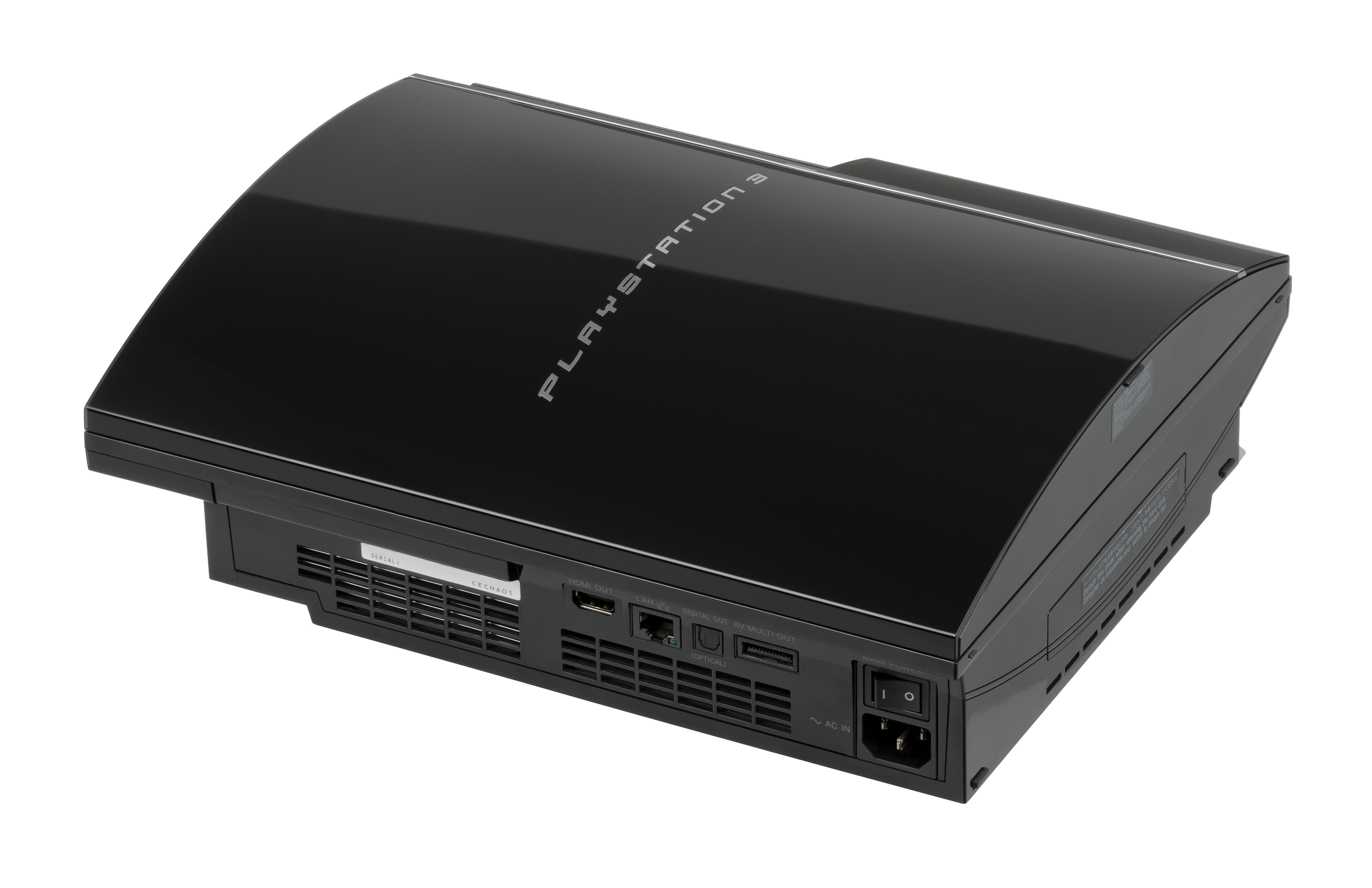
The PlayStation 3 was the first console to include an HDMI port.

The PlayStation 3 retained the same basic design across its three major hardware revisions, featuring a black plastic shell with a convex top when placed horizontally, or a convex-left side when oriented vertically. The original model used glossy piano black plastic and featured a logo inspired by the font used in the film Spider-Man (2002), produced under neighboring Sony subsidiary Sony Pictures. According to PlayStation designer Teiyu Goto, this logo was one of the first design elements selected by SCEI president Ken Kutaragi and helped shape the console's overall aesthetic.

The font would be abandoned at the introduction of the "Slim" revision in favor of an updated version of the PS2 logo with more curved edges, a design that would remain in use for the PS4 and PS5 logos.

=== Technical specifications ===
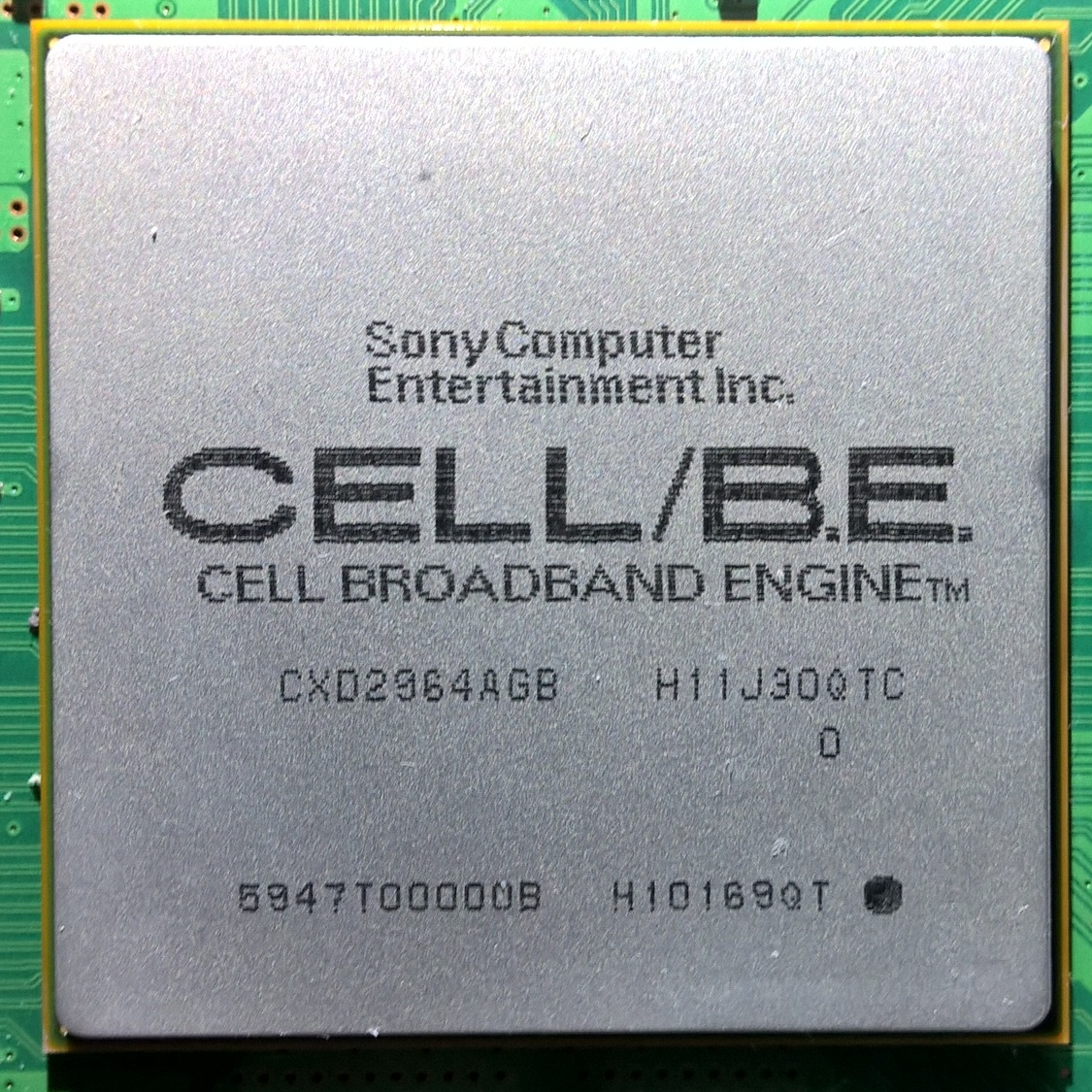
The Cell Broadband Engine on a PlayStation 3 motherboard

The PlayStation 3 is powered by the Cell Broadband Engine, a 64-bit CPU co-developed by Sony, Toshiba and IBM. It includes a 3.2 GHz PowerPC-based Power Processing Element (PPE) and seven Synergistic Processing Elements (SPEs). To improve manufacturing yield, the processor is initially fabricated with eight SPEs. After production, each chip is tested, and if a defect is found in one SPE, it is disabled using laser trimming. This approach minimizes waste by utilizing processors that would otherwise be discarded. Even in chips without defects, one SPE is intentionally disabled to ensure consistency across units. Of the seven operational SPEs, six are available for developers to use in games and applications, while the seventh is reserved for the console's operating system. The Cell processor is paired with 256 MB of high-bandwidth XDR DRAM.

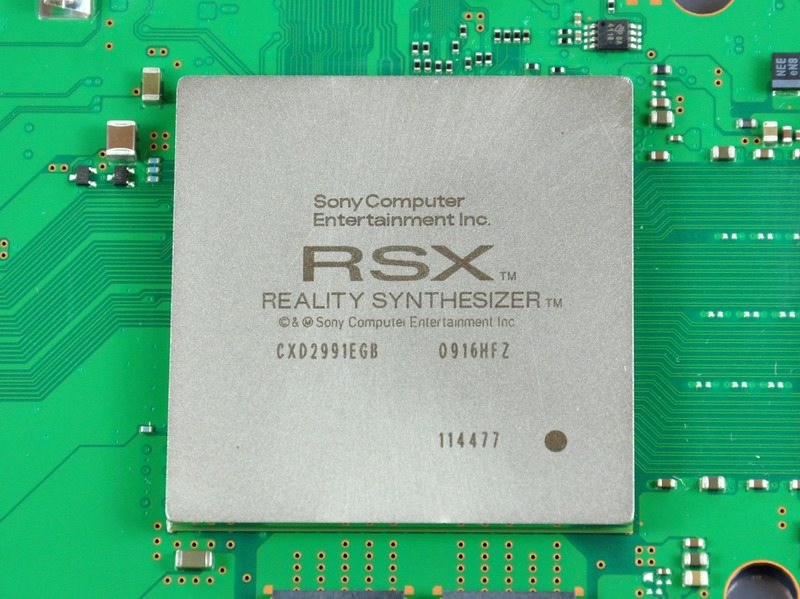
The RSX 'Reality Synthesizer' on a PlayStation 3 motherboard

Graphics processing is managed by the Reality Synthesizer (RSX), developed by Nvidia and paired with 256 MB of GDDR3 SDRAM video memory. The RSX chip can produce resolutions ranging from standard-definition (480i/576i) up to high-definition (1080p). Initially, Sony's hardware development team did not plan to include a dedicated GPU, believing the Cell processor could handle all graphics processing tasks. However, game developers, including Sony's ICE team (the central graphics technologies group for its game studios), demonstrated that without a dedicated GPU, the PlayStation 3's performance would fall short, particularly when compared to the Xbox 360. This feedback prompted the late-stage addition of the RSX GPU during the console's development.

Physical media games for the PlayStation 3 were sold on Blu-ray discs and the console features a 2× speed drive which is also capable of reading Blu-ray movies, DVDs, and CDs. Early models came with 20 GB or 60 GB hard drives, (Note: 20 GB model was not available in PAL regions.) with later versions offering up to 500 GB. (see: model comparison) All models have user-upgradeable hard drives. Connectivity options include Bluetooth 2.0 (supporting up to seven devices), Gigabit Ethernet, USB 2.0, and HDMI 1.4. All models except one early version feature built-in Wi-Fi, (Note: Original 20 GB model) and some early units include flash card readers for Memory Stick, SD and CompactFlash formats. (Note: 60 GB and CECHExx 80 GB models)

=== Models ===
The PlayStation 3 was released in three main designs: the original, the Slim, and the Super Slim. These revisions introduced changes such as reduced power consumption, smaller form factors, expanded storage, and the removal of certain features to lower costs.

=== Controllers and accessories ===
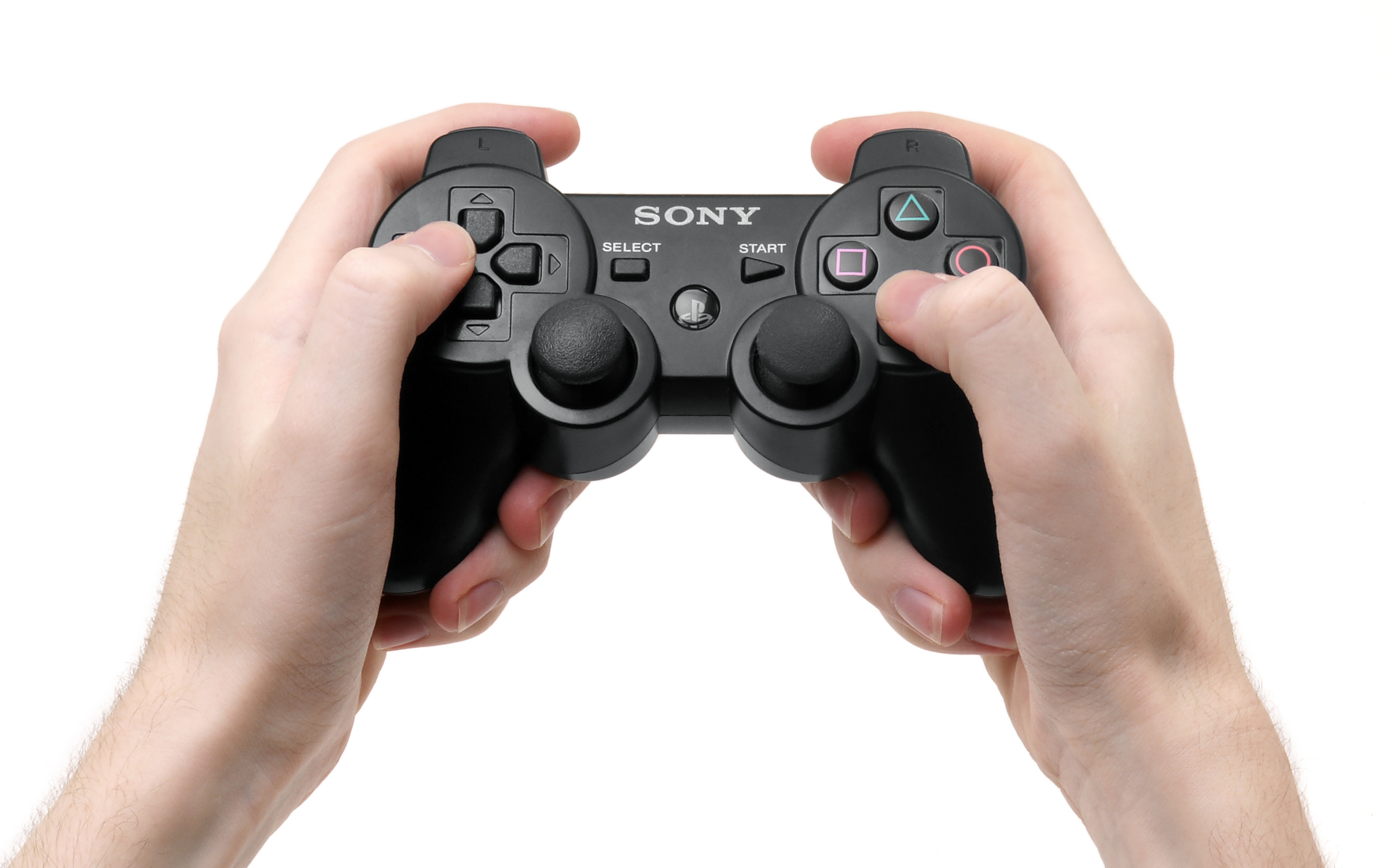
DualShock 3 controller in hand

The standard controller at the PlayStation 3's launch in 2006 was the wireless Sixaxis, which featured a built-in accelerometer capable of motion sensing across three directional and three rotational axes—six in total, hence the name. However, it lacked vibration functionality. In late 2007, Sony released the DualShock 3, which added vibration support while retaining all motion-sensing features.

Numerous other accessories for the console were also developed including the Logitech Driving Force GT, the Logitech Cordless Precision Controller, the Blu-ray Disc Remote, and the PlayTV DVB-T tuner and digital video recorder.

In response to the popularity of Nintendo’s motion controls on the Wii, Sony introduced the PlayStation Move in 2010. Its wand-style controllers use internal inertial sensors and a glowing orb tracked by the PlayStation Eye camera to enable precise motion-controlled gameplay.

=== Statistics regarding reliability ===
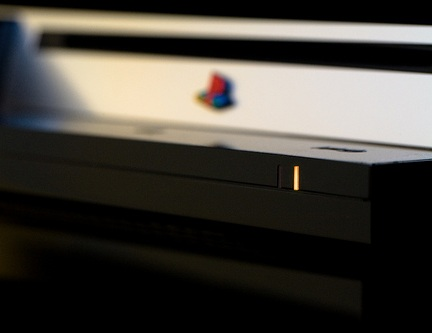
Some original PS3 systems display a yellow light, indicating a non-specific failure.

In September 2009, the BBC television program Watchdog aired a report investigating hardware failures in the PlayStation 3, referring to the issue as the "yellow light of death" (YLOD). The report claimed that affected consoles typically failed 18–24 months after purchase—outside of Sony's standard one-year warranty. After this period, users were required to pay a fixed fee to receive a refurbished replacement console from Sony.

However, according to Ars Technica, the failure rate of PlayStation 3 consoles remained within the expected range for consumer electronics. A 2009 study by warranty provider SquareTrade found a two-year failure rate of 10% for the PlayStation 3. Sony said its internal data indicated that only about 0.5% of consoles were returned with symptoms of the YLOD. In response to the Watchdog report, Sony issued a statement disputing the accuracy and tone of the report, arguing it was misleading.

=== Use in supercomputing ===
Beyond gaming, the PlayStation 3's hardware was embraced by researchers for high-performance computing applications. Thanks in part to Sony's early support for third-party operating systems, the PS3 was repurposed for tasks ranging from academic research to distributed computing. Dr. Frank Mueller of North Carolina State University clustered eight PS3s in 2007 using Fedora Linux and open-source toolsets. Although limited by the console's 256 MB of RAM, he called the system a cost-effective entry point into parallel computing. Sony and Stanford University also launched the Folding@home client, allowing PS3 owners to contribute processing power to study protein folding for disease research.

The U.S. military eventually recognized the PS3's computing potential as well. In 2010, the Air Force Research Laboratory built the Condor Cluster using 1,760 PS3 consoles, achieving 500 trillion floating-point operations per second. At the time, it was the 33rd most powerful supercomputer in the world and was used for analyzing high-resolution satellite imagery. The PS3 was also employed in cybersecurity research; in 2008, a group of researchers used a 200-console cluster to crack SSL encryption. These unconventional applications were curtailed by later hardware revisions that removed support for third-party operating systems.

== Software ==
=== System software ===
Sony included the ability for the operating system, referred to as System Software, to be updated. The updates can be acquired in several ways:

- If PlayStation 3 has an active Internet connection, updates may be downloaded directly from the PlayStation Network to PlayStation 3 and subsequently installed. Systems with active Internet will automatically check online for software updates each time the console is started.
- Using an external PC, a user may download the update from the official PlayStation website, transfer it to portable storage media and install it on the system.
- Some game discs come with system software updates on the disc. This may be due to the game requiring an update in order to run. If so, the software may be installed from the disc.

==== OtherOS support ====
PlayStation 3 initially shipped with the ability to install an alternative operating system alongside the main system software. Linux and other Unix-based operating systems were available. The hardware allowed access to six of the seven Synergistic Processing Elements of the Cell microprocessor, but not the RSX 'Reality Synthesizer' graphics chip.

The 'OtherOS' functionality was not present in the updated PS Slim models, and the feature was subsequently removed from previous versions of the PS3 as part of the machine's firmware update version 3.21 which was released on April 1, 2010; Sony cited security concerns as the rationale. The firmware update 3.21 was mandatory for access to the PlayStation Network. Eventually third-parties released a modified and unofficial version of the firmware to restore the feature.

The removal caused some controversy; as the update removed officially advertised features from already sold products, and gave rise to several class action lawsuits aimed at making Sony return the feature or provide compensation. On December 8, 2011, U.S. District Judge Richard Seeborg dismissed the last remaining count of the class action lawsuit (other claims in the suit had previously been dismissed), stating: "As a legal matter, ... plaintiffs have failed to allege facts or articulate a theory on which Sony may be held liable." As of January 2014, the U.S. Court of Appeals for the Ninth Circuit partially reversed the dismissal and had sent the case back to the district court.

==== Graphical user interface ====
The XrossMediaBar (XMB) used on the PlayStation 3 home screen

The standard PlayStation 3 version of the XrossMediaBar (pronounced "Cross Media Bar" and abbreviated XMB) includes nine categories of options. These are: Users, Settings, Photo, Music, Video, TV/Video Services, Game, Network, PlayStation Network and Friends (similar to the PlayStation Portable media bar). TheTV/Video Services category is for services like Netflix and if PlayTV or Torne is installed; the first category in this section is "My Channels", which lets users download various streaming services, including Sony's own streaming services Crackle and PlayStation Vue. By default, the What's New section of PlayStation Network is displayed when the system starts up. PS3 includes the ability to store various master and secondary user profiles, manage and explore photos with or without a musical slide show, play music and copy audio CD tracks to an attached data storage device, play movies and video files from the hard disk drive, an optical disc (Blu-ray Disc or DVD-Video) or an optional USB mass storage or Flash card, compatibility for a USB keyboard and mouse and a web browser supporting compatible-file download function. Additionally, UPnP media will appear in the respective audio/video/photo categories if a compatible media server or DLNA server is detected on the local network. The Friends menu allows mail with emoticon and attached picture features and video chat which requires an optional PlayStation Eye or EyeToy webcam. The Network menu allows online shopping through the PlayStation Store and connectivity to PlayStation Portable via Remote Play.

=== Digital rights management ===
PlayStation 3 console protects certain types of data and uses digital rights management to limit the data's use. Purchased games and content from the PlayStation Network store are governed by PlayStation's Network Digital Rights Management (NDRM). The NDRM allows users to access the data from up to 2 different PlayStation 3's that have been activated using a user's PlayStation Network ID. PlayStation 3 also limits the transfer of copy protected videos downloaded from its store to other machines and states that copy protected video "may not restore correctly" following certain actions after making a backup such as downloading a new copy protected movie.

=== Photo management ===
Photo Gallery

Photo Gallery main menu

Photo Gallery is an optional application to view, create, and group photos from PS3, which is installed separately from the system software at 105 MB. It was introduced in system software version 2.60 and provides a range of tools for sorting through and displaying the system's pictures. The key feature of this application is that it can organize photos into groups according to various criteria. Notable categorizations are colors, ages, or facial expressions of the people in the photos. Slideshows can be viewed with the application, along with music and playlists. The software was updated with the release of system software version 3.40 allowing users to upload and browse photos on Facebook and Picasa.

PlayMemories Studio

PlayMemories is an optional stereoscopic 3D (and also standard) photo viewing application, which is installed from the PlayStation Store at 956 MB. The application is dedicated specifically to 3D photos and features the ability to zoom into 3D environments and change the angle and perspective of panoramas. It requires system software 3.40 or higher; 3D photos; a 3D HDTV, and an HDMI cable for the 3D images to be viewed properly.

=== Video services ===
Video editor and uploader

A new application was released as part of system software version 3.40 which allows users to edit videos on PlayStation 3 and upload them to the Internet. The software features basic video editing tools including the ability to cut videos and add music and captions. Videos can then be rendered and uploaded to video sharing websites such as Facebook and YouTube.

Video on demand

In addition to the video service provided by the Sony Entertainment Network, the PlayStation 3 console has access to a variety of third-party video services, dependent on the region:

Since June 2009, VidZone has offered a free music video streaming service in Europe, Australia and New Zealand. In October 2009, Sony Computer Entertainment and Netflix announced that the Netflix streaming service would also be available on PlayStation 3 in the United States. A paid Netflix subscription was required for the service. The service became available in November 2009. Initially users had to use a free Blu-ray disc to access the service; however, in October 2010 the requirement to use a disc to gain access was removed.

In April 2010, support for MLB.tv was added, allowing MLB.tv subscribers to watch regular season games live in HD and access new interactive features designed exclusively for PSN.

In November 2010, access to the video and social networking site MUBI was enabled for European, New Zealand, and Australian users; the service integrates elements of social networking with rental or subscription video streaming, allowing users to watch and discuss films with other users. Also in November 2010 the video rental service VUDU, NHL GameCenter Live, and subscription service Hulu Plus launched on PlayStation 3 in the United States.

In August 2011, Sony, in partnership with DirecTV, added NFL Sunday Ticket. Then in October 2011, Best Buy launched an app for its CinemaNow service. In April 2012, Amazon.com launched an Amazon Video app, accessible to Amazon Prime subscribers (in the US).

Upon reviewing the PlayStation and Netflix collaboration, Pocket-Lint said "We've used the Netflix app on Xbox too and, as good as it is, we think the PS3 version might have the edge here." and stated that having Netflix and LoveFilm on PlayStation is "mind-blowingly good."

In July 2013, YuppTV OTT player launched its branded application on the PS3 computer entertainment system in the United States.

=== Audio capabilities ===
The PlayStation 3 has the ability to play standard audio CDs, a feature that was notably removed from its successors. PlayStation 3 added the ability for ripping audio CDs to store them on the system's hard disk; the system has transcoders for ripping to either MP3, AAC, or Sony's own ATRAC (ATRAC3plus) formats. Early models were also able to playback Super Audio CDs, however this support was dropped in the third generation revision of the console from late 2007. However, all models do retain Direct Stream Digital playback ability.

PlayStation 3 can also play music from portable players by connecting the player to the system's USB port, including from Walkman digital audio players and other ATRAC players and other players that use the UMS protocol. The PlayStation 3 did not feature the Sony CONNECT Music Store.

=== Leap year bug ===
On March 1, 2010 (UTC), many of the original PlayStation 3 models worldwide were experiencing errors related to their internal system clock. The error had many symptoms. Initially, the main problem seemed to be the inability to connect to the PlayStation Network. However, the root cause of the problem was unrelated to the PlayStation Network, since even users who had never been online also had problems playing installed offline games (which queried the system timer as part of startup) and using system themes. At the same time, many users noted that the console's clock had gone back to December 31, 1999. The event was nicknamed the ApocalyPS3, a play on the word apocalypse and PS3, the abbreviation for the PlayStation 3 console.

The error code displayed was typically 8001050F and affected users were unable to sign in, play games, use dynamic themes, and view/sync trophies. The problem only resided within the first- through third-generation original PS3 units while the newer "Slim" models were unaffected because of different internal hardware for the clock.

Sony confirmed that there was an error and stated that it was narrowing down the issue and were continuing to work to restore service. By March 2 (UTC), 2010, owners of original PS3 models could connect to PSN successfully and the clock no longer showed December 31, 1999. Sony stated that the affected models incorrectly identified 2010 as a leap year, because of a bug in the BCD method of storing the date. However, for some users, the hardware's operating system clock (mainly updated from the internet and not associated with the internal clock) needed to be updated manually or by re-syncing it via the internet.

On June 29, 2010, Sony released PS3 system software update 3.40, which improved the functionality of the internal clock to properly account for leap years.

== Features ==
=== PlayStation Portable connectivity ===
PlayStation Portable can connect with PlayStation 3 in many ways, including in-game connectivity. For example, Formula One Championship Edition, a racing game, was shown at E3 2006 using a PSP as a real-time rear-view mirror. In addition, users are able to download original PlayStation format games from the PlayStation Store, transfer and play them on PSP as well as PS3 itself. It is also possible to use the Remote Play feature to play these and some PlayStation Network games, remotely on PSP over a network or internet connection.

Sony has also demonstrated PSP playing back video content from PlayStation 3 hard disk across an ad hoc wireless network. This feature is referred to as Remote Play located under the browser icon on both PlayStation 3 and PlayStation Portable. Remote play has since expanded to allow remote access to PS3 via PSP from any wireless access point in the world.

== PlayStation Network ==
PlayStation Network is the unified online multiplayer gaming and digital media delivery service provided by Sony Computer Entertainment for PlayStation 3 and PlayStation Portable, announced during the 2006 PlayStation Business Briefing meeting in Tokyo. The service is always connected, free, and includes multiplayer support. The network enables online gaming, the PlayStation Store, PlayStation Home and other services. PlayStation Network uses real currency and PlayStation Network Cards as seen with the PlayStation Store and PlayStation Home.

=== PlayStation Plus ===
PlayStation Plus (commonly abbreviated PS+ and occasionally referred to as PSN Plus) is a premium PlayStation Network subscription service that was officially unveiled at E3 2010 by Jack Tretton, President and CEO of SCEA. Rumors of such service had been in speculation since Kaz Hirai's announcement at TGS 2009 of a possible paid service for PSN but with the current PSN service still available. Launched alongside PS3 firmware 3.40 and PSP firmware 6.30 on June 29, 2010, the paid-for subscription service provides users with enhanced services on the PlayStation Network, on top of the current PSN service which is still available with all of its features. These enhancements include the ability to have demos and game updates download automatically to PlayStation 3. Subscribers also get early or exclusive access to some betas, game demos, premium downloadable content, and other PlayStation Store items. North American users also get a free subscription to Qore. Users may choose to purchase either a one-year or a three-month subscription to PlayStation Plus.

=== PlayStation Store ===
The PlayStation Store is an online virtual market available to users of Sony's PlayStation 3 (PS3) and PlayStation Portable (PSP) game consoles via the PlayStation Network. The Store offers a range of downloadable content both for purchase and available free of charge. Available content includes full games, add-on content, playable demos, themes and game and movie trailers. The service is accessible through an icon on the XMB on PS3 and PSP. The PS3 store can also be accessed on PSP via a Remote Play connection to PS3. The PSP store is also available via the PC application, Media Go. As of September 24, 2009, there have been over 600 million downloads from the PlayStation Store worldwide.

The PlayStation Store is updated with new content each Tuesday in North America, and each Wednesday in PAL regions. In May 2010 this was changed from Thursdays to allow PSP games to be released digitally, closer to the time they are released on UMD.

On March 29, 2021, Sony announced that it would shut down the PS3 version of the Store on July 2, though previous purchases on the store would remain downloadable. However, on April 19, following fan feedback, Sony reversed their decision and confirmed that the PS3 store would remain operational. On July 1, 2026, Sony once again made the decision to close the store, starting in select Latin American countries in August, and in the rest of the world the following year.

=== What's New ===
What's New was announced at Gamescom 2009 and was released on September 1, 2009, with PlayStation 3 system software 3.0. The feature was to replace the existing [Information Board], which displayed news from the PlayStation website associated with the user's region. The concept was developed further into a major PlayStation Network feature, which interacts with the [Status Indicator] to display a ticker of all content, excluding recently played content (currently in North America and Japan only).

The system displays the What's New screen by default instead of the [Games] menu (or [Video] menu, if a movie was inserted) when starting up. What's New has four sections: "Our Pick", "Recently Played", the latest information, and new content available in PlayStation Store. There are four kinds of content the What's New screen displays and links to, on the sections. "Recently Played" displays the user's recently played games and online services only, whereas, the other sections can contain website links, links to play videos, and access to selected sections of the PlayStation Store.

The PlayStation Store icons in the [Game] and [Video] section act similarly to the What's New screen, except that they only display and link to games and videos in the PlayStation Store, respectively.

=== PlayStation Home ===
PlayStation Home was a virtual 3D social networking service for the PlayStation Network. Home allowed users to create a custom avatar, which could be groomed realistically. Users could edit and decorate their personal apartments, avatars, or club houses with free, premium, or won content. Users could shop for new items or win prizes from PS3 games, or Home activities. Users could interact and connect with friends and customize content in a virtual world. Home also acted as a meeting place for users that wanted to play multiplayer video games with others.

A closed beta began in Europe from May 2007 and expanded to other territories soon after. Home was delayed and expanded several times before initially releasing. The Open Beta test was started on December 11, 2008. It remained as a perpetual beta until its closure on March 31, 2015. Home was available directly from the PlayStation 3 XrossMediaBar. Membership was free, but required a PSN account.

Home featured places to meet and interact, dedicated game spaces, developer spaces, company spaces, and events. The service underwent a weekly maintenance and frequent updates. At the time of its closure in March 2015, Home had been downloaded by over 41 million users.

=== Life with PlayStation ===
The Life with PlayStation application showing weather forecasts and news headlines for New York City. Screenshot taken at approximately 8pm PST.

Life with PlayStation, released on September 18, 2008 to succeed Folding@home, was retired November 6, 2012. Life with PlayStation used virtual globe data to display news and information by city. Along with Folding@home functionality, the application provided access to three other information "channels", the first being the Live Channel offering news headlines and weather which were provided by Google News, The Weather Channel, the University of Wisconsin–Madison Space Science and Engineering Center, among other sources. The second channel was the World Heritage channel which offered historical information about historical sites. The third channel was the United Village channel. United Village was designed to share information about communities and cultures worldwide. An update allowed video and photo viewing in the application. The fourth channel was the U.S. exclusive PlayStation Network Game Trailers Channel for direct streaming of game trailers.

=== Outage ===
On April 20, 2011, Sony shut down the PlayStation Network and Qriocity for a prolonged interval, revealing on April 23 that this was due to "an external intrusion on our system". Sony later revealed that the personal information of 77 million users might have been taken, including: names; addresses; countries; email addresses; birthdates; PSN/Qriocity logins, passwords and handles/PSN online IDs. It also stated that it was possible that users' profile data, including purchase history and billing address, and PlayStation Network/Qriocity password security answers may have been obtained. There was no evidence that any credit card data had been taken, but the possibility could not be ruled out, and Sony advised customers that their credit card data may have been obtained. Additionally, the credit card numbers were encrypted and Sony never collected the three digit CVC or CSC number from the back of the credit cards which is required for authenticating some transactions. In response to the incident, Sony announced a "Welcome Back" program, 30 days free membership of PlayStation Plus for all PSN members, two free downloadable PS3 games, and a free one-year enrollment in an identity theft protection program.

== Sales and production costs ==
Region	Units sold	First available
Canada	"about 1.5 million" as of October 6, 2010	November 17, 2006
Europe (includes UK and other PAL regions)	30 million as of December 19, 2012	March 23, 2007
Japan	9.3 million as of June 27, 2013	November 11, 2006
United Kingdom	5.5 million as of June 27, 2013	March 23, 2007
United States	22.9 million as of June 27, 2013	November 17, 2006
Worldwide	87.4 million (as of March 31, 2017)	November 11, 2006

Although its PlayStation predecessors had been very dominant against the competition and were hugely profitable for Sony, PlayStation 3 had an inauspicious start, and Sony chairman and CEO Sir Howard Stringer initially could not convince investors of a turnaround in its fortunes. The PS3 lacked the unique gameplay of the more affordable Wii which became that generation's most successful console in terms of units sold. Furthermore, PS3 had to compete directly with Xbox 360 which had a market head start, and as a result the platform no longer had exclusive titles that the PS2 enjoyed such as the Grand Theft Auto and Final Fantasy series (regarding cross-platform games, Xbox 360 versions were generally considered superior in 2006, although by 2008 the PS3 versions had reached parity or surpassed), and it took longer than expected for PS3 to enjoy strong sales and close the gap with Xbox 360. Sony also continued to lose money on each PS3 sold through 2010, although the redesigned "slim" PS3 cut these losses.

PlayStation 3's initial production cost is estimated by iSuppli to have been US$805.85 for the 20 GB model and US$840.35 for the 60 GB model. However, they were priced at US$499 and US$599, respectively, meaning that units may have been sold at an estimated loss of $306 or $241 depending on model, if the cost estimates were correct, and thus may have contributed to Sony's games division posting an operating loss of ¥232.3 billion (US$1.97 billion) in the fiscal year ending March 2007. In April 2007, soon after these results were published, Ken Kutaragi, President of Sony Computer Entertainment, announced plans to retire. Various news agencies, including The Times and The Wall Street Journal reported that this was due to poor sales, while SCEI maintains that Kutaragi had been planning his retirement for six months prior to the announcement.

In January 2008, Kaz Hirai, CEO of Sony Computer Entertainment, suggested that the console may start making a profit by early 2009, stating that, "the next fiscal year starts in April and if we can try to achieve that in the next fiscal year that would be a great thing" and that "[profitability] is not a definite commitment, but that is what I would like to try to shoot for". However, market analysts Nikko Citigroup have predicted that PlayStation 3 could be profitable by August 2008. In a July 2008 interview, Hirai stated that his objective is for PlayStation 3 to sell 150 million units by its ninth year, surpassing PlayStation 2's sales of 140 million in its nine years on the market. In January 2009 Sony announced that their gaming division was profitable in Q3 2008.

After the system's launch, production costs were reduced significantly as a result of phasing out the Emotion Engine chip and falling hardware costs. The cost of manufacturing Cell microprocessors had fallen dramatically as a result of moving to the 65 nm production process, and Blu-ray Disc diodes had become cheaper to manufacture. As of January 2008, each unit cost around $400 to manufacture; by August 2009, Sony had reduced costs by a total of 70%, meaning it only cost Sony around $240 per unit. The PlayStation 3's actual manufacturing cost at launch was never officially disclosed; SCE's Phil Harrison said in a 2019 interview that during the system's launch "it was a worry because 600 bucks was actually too cheap, because the machine was so expensive to make", before telling the interviewer that he can't disclose the real figure but that it would "make your eyebrows shoot clear off the top of your head".

Life-to-date number of units shipped, millions
Date	Quarterly	Lifetime
2006-12-31	1.7	1.7
2007-03-31	1.8	3.5
2007-06-30	0.7	4.2
2007-09-30	1.3	5.5
2007-12-31	4.9	10.4
2008-03-31	2.2	12.6
2008-06-30	1.6	14.2
2008-09-30	2.4	16.6
2008-12-31	4.5	21.1
2009-03-31	1.6	22.7
2009-06-30	1.1	23.8
2009-09-30	3.2	27.0
2009-12-31	6.5	33.5
2010-03-31	2.2	35.7
2010-06-30	2.4	38.1
2010-09-30	3.5	41.6
2010-12-31	6.3	47.9
2011-03-31	2.1	50.0
2011-06-30	1.8	51.8
2011-09-30	3.7	55.5
2011-12-31	6.5	62.0
2012-03-31	1.9	63.9
2012-06-30	N/A	N/A
2012-09-30	N/A	N/A
2012-12-31	N/A	N/A
2013-03-31	N/A	N/A
2013-06-30	1.1	N/A
2013-09-30	2.0	N/A
2013-12-31	3.3	N/A
2014-03-31	0.7	N/A
2014-06-30	0.8	N/A
2014-09-30	0.8	N/A
2014-12-31	1.1	N/A
2015-03-31	0.4	N/A
2015-06-30	N/A	N/A
2015-09-30	N/A	N/A
2015-12-31	N/A	N/A
2016-03-31	N/A	N/A
2016-06-30	N/A	N/A
2016-09-30	N/A	N/A
2016-12-31	N/A	N/A
2017-03-31	N/A	87.4

== Critical reception ==
Early PlayStation 3 reviews after launch were critical of its high price and lack of quality games. Game developers regarded the architecture as difficult to program for. PS3 was, however, commended for its hardware including its Blu-ray home theater capabilities and graphics potential.

Critical and commercial reception to PS3 improved over time, after a series of price revisions, Blu-ray's victory over HD DVD, and the release of several well received titles. Ars Technica's original launch review gave PS3 only a 6/10, but second review of the console in June 2008 rated it a 9/10. In September 2009, IGN named PlayStation 3 the 15th-best gaming console of all time, behind both of its competitors: Wii (10th) and Xbox 360 (6th). However, the PS3 won IGN's "Console Showdown"—based on which console offers the best selection of games released during each year—in three of the four years since it began (2008, 2009 and 2011, with Xbox winning in 2010). IGN judged PlayStation 3 to have the best game line-up of 2008, based on their review scores in comparison to those of Wii and Xbox 360. In a comparison piece by PC Magazine's Will Greenwald in June 2012, PS3 was selected as an overall better console compared to Xbox 360. Pocket-Lint said of the console: "The PS3 has always been a brilliant games console," and that "For now, this is just about the best media device for the money."

=== Original model ===
PS3 was given the number-eight spot on PC World magazine's list of "The Top 21 Tech Screwups of 2006", where it was criticized for being "Late, Expensive and Incompatible". GamesRadar ranked the PS3 as the top item in a feature on game-related PR disasters, asking how Sony managed to "take one of the most anticipated game systems of all time and—within the space of a year—turn it into a hate object reviled by the entire internet", but added that despite its problems the system has "untapped potential". Business Week summed up the general opinion by stating that it was "more impressed with what the PlayStation 3 could do than with what it currently does".

Developers also found the machine difficult to program for. In 2007, Gabe Newell of Valve said "The PS3 is a total disaster on so many levels, I think it's really clear that Sony lost track of what customers and what developers wanted". He continued "I'd say, even at this late date, they should just cancel it and do a do over. Just say, 'This was a horrible disaster and we're sorry and we're going to stop selling this and stop trying to convince people to develop for it'". Doug Lombardi VP of Marketing for Valve has since stated that Valve is interested in developing for the console and is looking to hire talented PS3 programmers for future projects. He later restated Valve's position, "Until we have the ability to get a PS3 team together, until we find the people who want to come to Valve or who are at Valve who want to work on that, I don't really see us moving to that platform". At Sony's E3 2010 press conference, Newell made a live appearance to recant his previous statements, citing Sony's move to make the system more developer-friendly, and to announce that Valve would be developing Portal 2 for the system. He also claimed that the inclusion of Steamworks (Valve's system to automatically update their software independently) would help to make the PS3 version of Portal 2 the best console version on the market.

Activision Blizzard CEO Bobby Kotick has criticized PS3's high development costs and inferior attach rate and return to that of Xbox 360 and Wii. He believes these factors are pushing developers away from working on the console. In an interview with The Times Kotick stated "I'm getting concerned about Sony; the PlayStation 3 is losing a bit of momentum and they don't make it easy for me to support the platform." He continued, "It's expensive to develop for the console, and the Wii and the Xbox are just selling better. Games generate a better return on invested capital (ROIC) on the Xbox than on the PlayStation." Kotick also claimed that Activision Blizzard may stop supporting the system if the situation is not addressed. "[Sony has] to cut the [PS3's retail] price, because if they don't, the attach rates are likely to slow. If we are being realistic, we might have to stop supporting Sony." Kotick received heavy criticism for the statement, notably from developer BioWare who questioned the wisdom of the threatened move, and referred to the statement as "silly."

Despite the initial negative press, several websites have given the system very good reviews mostly regarding its hardware. CNET United Kingdom praised the system saying, "the PS3 is a versatile and impressive piece of home-entertainment equipment that lives up to the hype [...] the PS3 is well worth its hefty price tag." CNET awarded it a score of 8.8 out of 10 and voted it as its number one "must-have" gadget, praising its robust graphical capabilities and stylish exterior design while criticizing its limited selection of available games. In addition, both Home Theater Magazine and Ultimate AV have given the system's Blu-ray playback very favorable reviews, stating that the quality of playback exceeds that of many current standalone Blu-ray Disc players.

In an interview, Kazuo Hirai, chairman of Sony Computer Entertainment argued for the choice of a complex architecture. Hexus Gaming reviewed the PAL version and summed the review up by saying, "as the PlayStation 3 matures and developers start really pushing it, we'll see the PlayStation 3 emerge as the console of choice for gaming." At GDC 2007, Shiny Entertainment founder Dave Perry stated, "I think that Sony has made the best machine. It's the best piece of hardware, without question".

=== Slim model and rebranding ===
The PlayStation 3 Slim received extremely positive reviews as well as a boost in sales; less than 24 hours after its announcement, PS3 Slim took the number-one bestseller spot on Amazon.com in the video games section for fifteen consecutive days. It regained the number-one position again one day later. The PS3 Slim also received praise from PC World, who awardedn it a score of 90 out of 100, praising its new repackaging and the new value it brought at a lower price, while also praising its quietness and the reduction in its power consumption. This is in stark contrast to the original PS3's launch, which was placed at number-eight on PC World's list of "The Top 21 Tech Screwups of 2006" list.

CNET awarded the PS3 Slim a score of four out of five stars, praising its Blu-ray capabilities, 120 GB hard drive, free online gaming service and more affordable pricing point, but criticizing the lack of backward compatibility for PlayStation 2 games. TechRadar gave the PS3 Slim a score of four-and-a-half stars out of five praising its new smaller size and summed up its review stating "Over all, the PS3 Slim is a phenomenal piece of kit. It's amazing that something so small can do so much". However, they criticized the exterior design and the build quality in relation to the original model.

Eurogamer called it "a product where the cost-cutting has—by and large—been tastefully done" and said "It's nothing short of a massive win for Sony."

=== Super Slim model ===
The Super Slim model of the PS3 has received positive reviews. Gaming website Spong praised the new Super Slim's quietness, stating "The most noticeable noise comes when the drive seeks a new area of the disc, such as when starting to load a game, and this occurs infrequently." They added that the fans are quieter than those of Slim, and went on to praise the new smaller, lighter size. Criticism was placed on the new disc loader, stating: "The cover can be moved by hand if you wish, there's also an eject button to do the work for you, but there is no software eject from the triangle button menus in the Xross Media Bar (XMB) interface. In addition, you have to close the cover by hand, which can be a bit fiddly if it's upright, and the PS3 won't start reading a disc unless you do [close the cover]." They also said there is no real drop in retail price.

Technology and media website CNET gave new the Super Slim model a score of four out of five stars ("Excellent"), saying "The Super Slim PlayStation 3 shrinks a powerful gaming machine into an even tinier package while maintaining the same features as its predecessors: a great gaming library and a strong array of streaming services [...]", whilst also criticising the "cheap" design and disc-loader, stating: "Sometimes [the cover] doesn't catch and you feel like you're using one of those old credit card imprinter machines. In short, it feels cheap. You don't realize how convenient autoloading disc trays are until they're gone. Whether it was to cut costs or save space, this move is ultimately a step back." The criticism also was due to price, stating the cheapest Super Slim model was still more expensive than the cheapest Slim model, and that the smaller size and bigger hard drive should not be considered an upgrade when the hard drive on a Slim model is easily removed and replaced. They did praise that the hard drive of the Super Slim model is "the easiest yet. Simply sliding off the side panel reveals the drive bay, which can quickly be unscrewed." They also stated that whilst the Super Slim model is not in any way an upgrade, it could be an indicator as to what's to come. "It may not be revolutionary, but the Super Slim PS3 is the same impressive machine in a much smaller package. There doesn't seem to be any reason for existing PS3 owners to upgrade, but for the prospective PS3 buyer, the Super Slim is probably the way to go if you can deal with not having a slot-loading disc drive."

Pocket-Lint gave the Super Slim model a very positive review saying "It's much more affordable, brilliant gaming, second-to-none video and media player." They think it is "A blinding good console and one that will serve you for years to come with second-hand games and even new releases. Without doubt, if you don't have a PS3, this is the time to buy." They gave the Super Slim model a score of four-and-a-half stars out of five.

Technology magazine T3 gave the Super Slim model a positive review, stating the console is almost "nostalgic" in the design similarities to the original "fat" model, "While we don't know whether it will play PS3 games or Blu-ray discs any differently yet, the look and feel of the new PS3 Slim is an obvious homage to the original PS3, minus the considerable excess weight. Immediately we would be concerned about the durability of the top loading tray that feels like it could be yanked straight out off the console, but ultimately it all feels like Sony's nostalgic way of signing off the current-generation console in anticipation for the PS4."
