= Thorn Lake =

Thorn Lake may refer to:

- Thorn Lake (Lake County, Oregon)
- Thorn Lake (Portage County, Wisconsin)
