= PlayStation 3 accessories =

Overview of the accessories made for the PlayStation 3

Various accessories for the PlayStation 3 video game console have been produced by Sony and third-party companies. These include controllers, audio and video input devices like microphones, video cameras, and cables for better sound and picture quality.

The controllers include the DualShock 3, a keypad that connects to the aforementioned controller, a controller similar to those for the Xbox Kinect that allows for motion controls, and miscellaneous others used for a specific use. Headsets (mostly used for communications, not game audio) are the major A/V devices, followed by cameras and other input devices. Finally, a composite video cable set, USB cable sets, and memory adaptors complete the accessories.

== Game controllers ==
=== Sixaxis ===
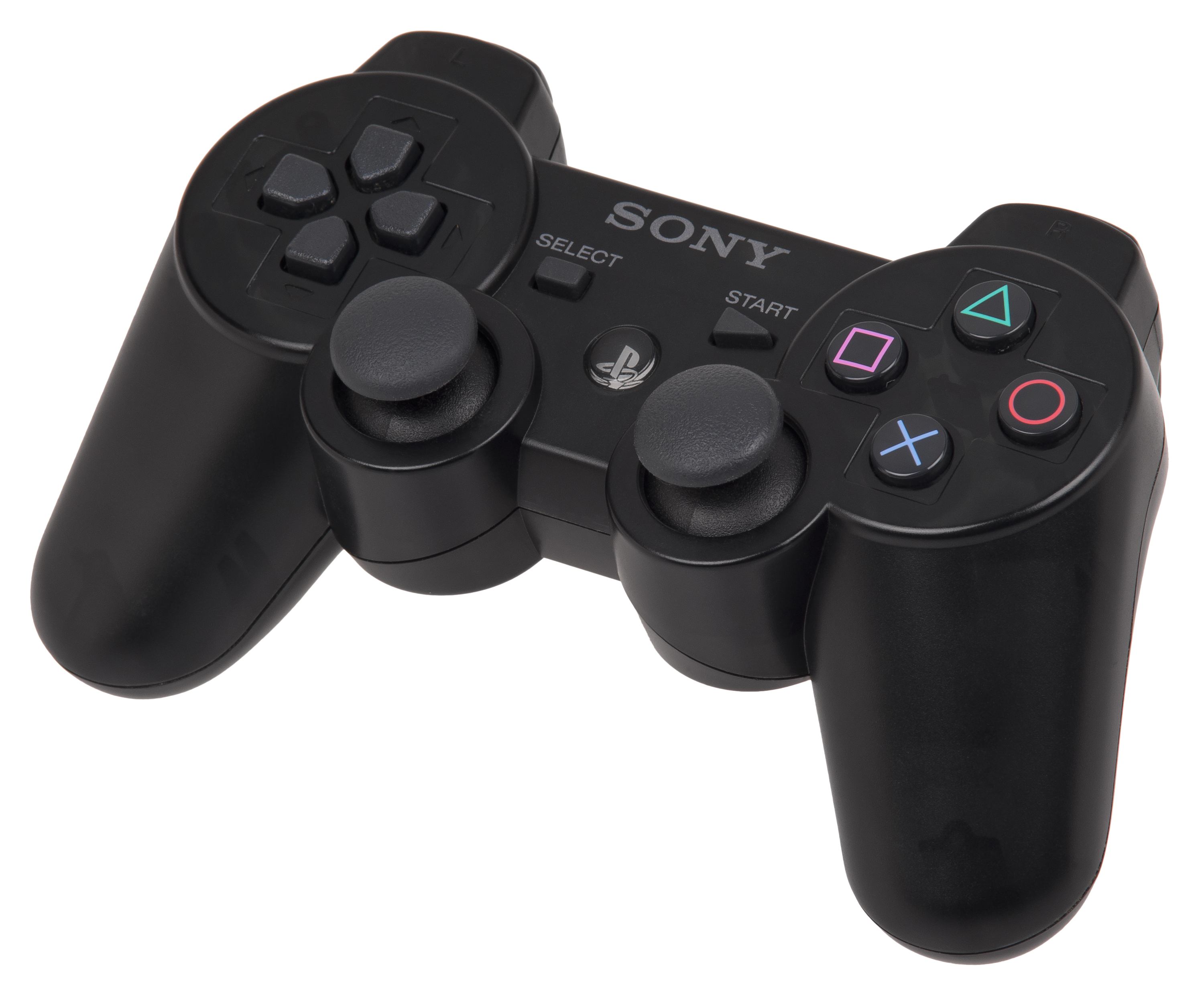
Sixaxis controller

The Sixaxis Wireless Controller (SCPH-98040/CECHZC1) (trademarked "SIXAXIS") was the official wireless controller for the PlayStation 3 until it was succeeded by the DualShock 3. In Japan, individual Sixaxis controllers were available for purchase simultaneously with the console's launch. "Sixaxis" refers to the motion sensing technology used in both the Sixaxis and DualShock 3 controllers.

Its design is an evolution of the DualShock 2 controller, retaining its pressure-sensitive buttons, layout and basic shape. Unlike the DualShock 2, however, it is a Bluetooth wireless controller (it will also function as a wired controller via USB) and features motion sensing technology. It also does not feature vibration motors (these were re-added in the DualShock 3). The L2 and R2 buttons were replaced with analog triggers and the precision of the analog sticks was increased from 8-bit to 10-bit. In place of the "Analog" button is a button labeled with the PlayStation logo, which allows access to the system menu. The underside of the case is also slightly enlarged to accommodate the internal battery. The Sixaxis is constructed of slightly translucent plastic, rather than the opaque plastic used on the DualShock 2 (and the later DualShock 3).

=== DualShock 3 ===
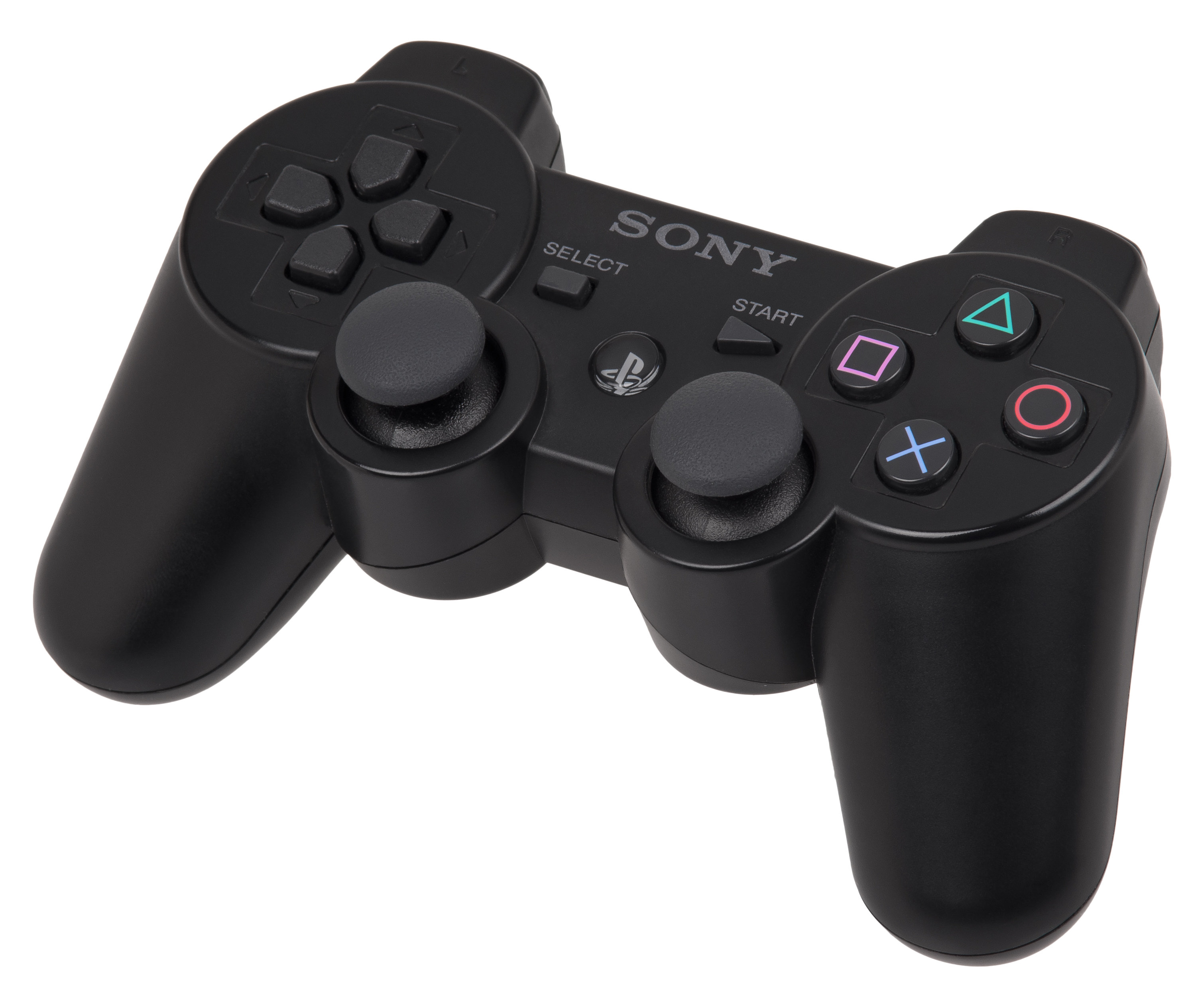
DualShock 3 controller

Replacing the Sixaxis as the standard PlayStation 3 controller, the DualShock 3 (SCPH-98050/CECHZC2, trademarked "DUALSHOCK 3") features the same functions and design (including "Sixaxis" motion sensing), but with vibration feedback capability.

Cosmetically, the DualShock 3 is nearly identical to the Sixaxis, with the only differences being that "DUALSHOCK 3" is printed on the top (with the original "SIXAXIS" label moved down) and that the body is made of opaque plastic rather than the slightly translucent plastic used on the Sixaxis. The vibration function does not interfere with the motion sensing function, and both functions can be used at once. Like the Sixaxis, it is a wireless controller with a mini-USB port on the rear that is used for charging, as well as for playing while charging.

Released alongside new PlayStation 3 models in Japan on January 11, 2008, the DualShock 3 was initially available in Black and Ceramic White colors, matching the color options for the new console models. On March 6, a Satin Silver DualShock 3 was released in Japan, again alongside a new console color. The black DualShock 3 was released in the United States on April 2 and in Europe on July 2. On October 30, 2008, the DualShock 3 became the standard controller packaged with PlayStation 3 consoles, starting with the (non-PS2-backwards compatible) 80 GB models.

Both controllers can also be used on the PSP Go via Bluetooth (requires a PSP system for initial connection).

=== Charging stand ===
An official charging stand for PlayStation 3 controllers was released in Japan on April 21, 2011 (CECH-ZDC1J). It is capable of charging two controllers simultaneously and is powered by a wall plug.

Third-party charging stands are available in regions outside of Japan.

=== Wireless keyboard ===
The official wireless keyboard peripheral (CECH-ZKB1x, where x is a region code) was released in June 2011. There are localizations in JP, GB, FR, DE, ES, IT, KR, TW, HK, RU. It runs on 2 replaceable AA batteries. It includes a nub mouse. It requires PS3 system software version 3.60 or higher

=== Wireless keypad ===
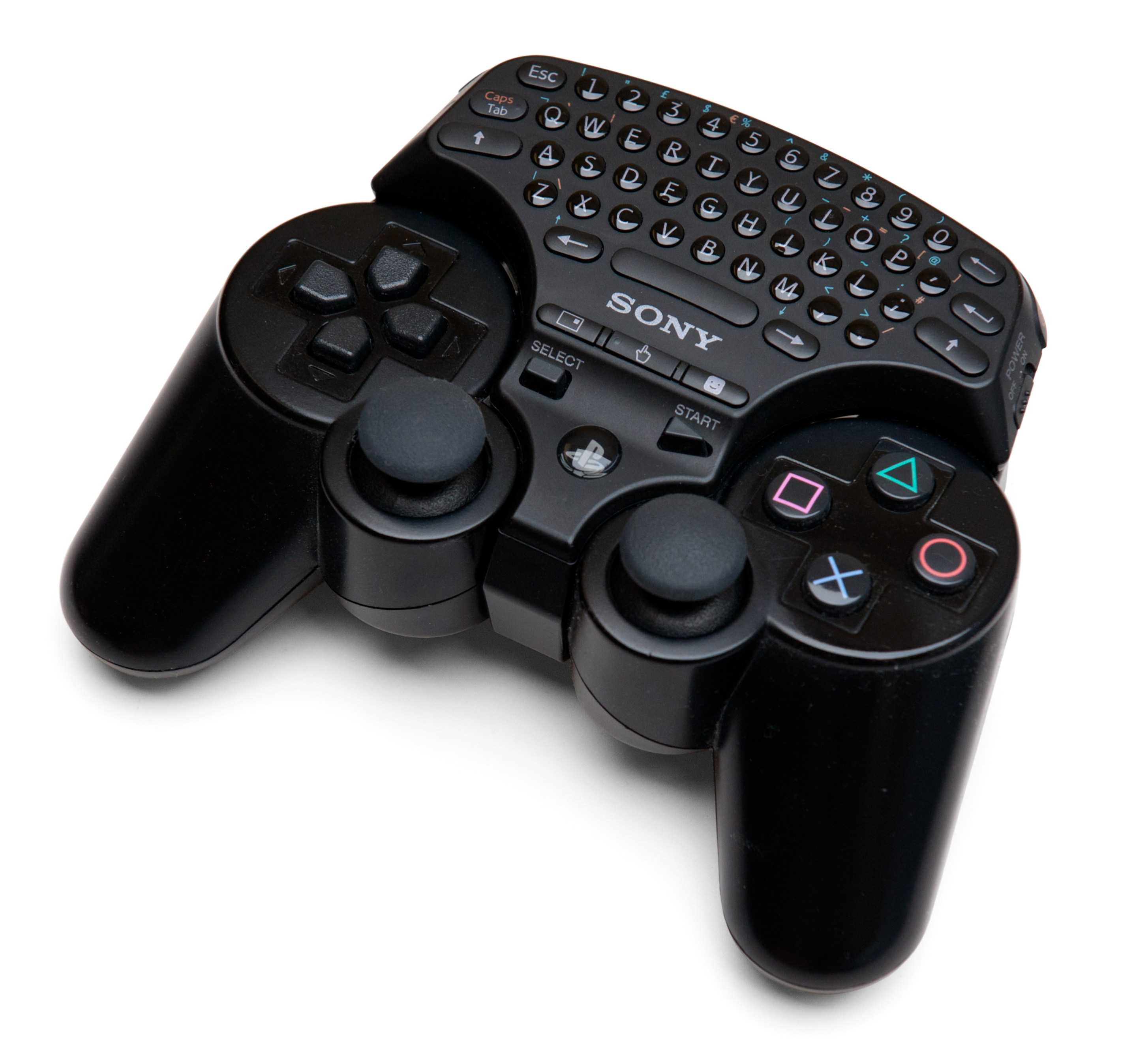
PlayStation 3 Wireless Keypad

The wireless keypad peripheral (CECH-ZK1xx, where xx is a region code) was launched in Europe on November 28, 2008, early December 2008 in North America, and came to Japan in late 2008. As well as acting as keyboard, the wireless keypad features a touchpad button (labelled as a pointing hand, similar to the pointer used in the web browser), which allows the surface of the keypad to be used as a touchpad, allowing users to move the pointer by sliding their fingers around the keypad surface. When in touchpad mode, the left and right arrow buttons act as left and right mouse buttons, respectively.

Although designed to be directly attached to the controller, the keypad features an internal battery and an independent Bluetooth connection, and does not connect to the controller electronically in any way, meaning it can function separately from the controller. The keypad must be first connected to the PlayStation 3 via a USB mini-B to USB-A cable or put into Bluetooth discovery mode (by holding down the "blue" modifier key when switching the device on) so it can be paired and subsequently used. Discovery mode can also be used to pair the keypad with other Bluetooth compatible devices such as computers and mobile phones, where it will function as both a keyboard and a touchpad (where supported by the host device). The keypad also features two shortcut buttons, letting users jump to the "Friends" screen and "Message Box" on the XMB during game play.

=== PlayStation Move ===
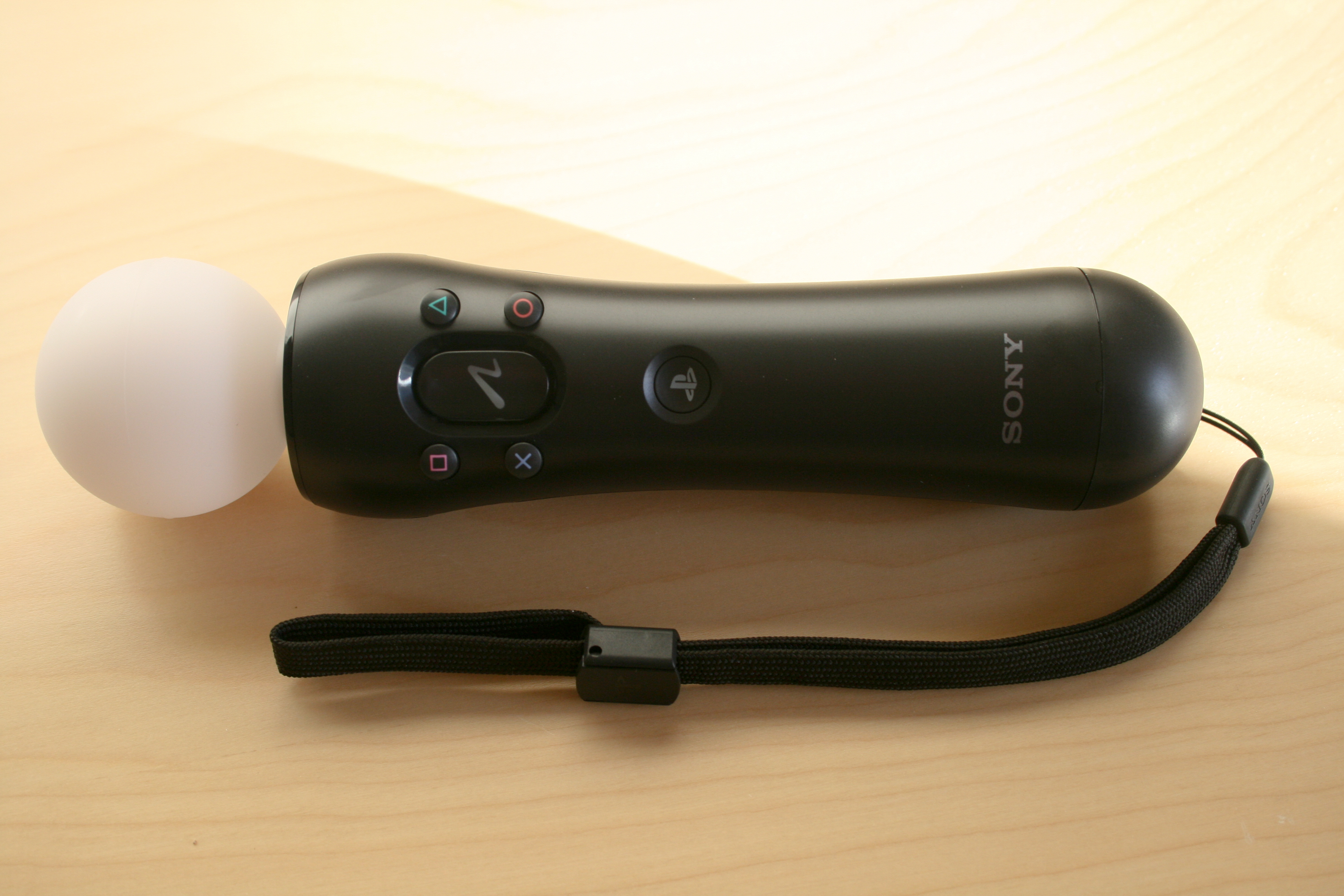
PlayStation Move motion controller

PlayStation Move (CECH-ZCM1x, where x is a region code) is a motion-sensing game controller platform for the PlayStation 3 (PS3) video game console by Sony Computer Entertainment (SCE). It was previously named PlayStation Motion Controller. Based on a handheld motion controller wand, PlayStation Move uses the PlayStation Eye webcam to track the wand's position, and inertial sensors in the wand to detect its motion (similar to the Wii Remote). First revealed on June 2, 2009, PlayStation Move was launched in September 2010 in most countries and October 2010 in Japan. Hardware available at launch included the main PlayStation Move motion controller, and an optional PlayStation Move navigation controller (CECH-ZCS1x, where x is a region code).

=== Buzz! Buzzer ===
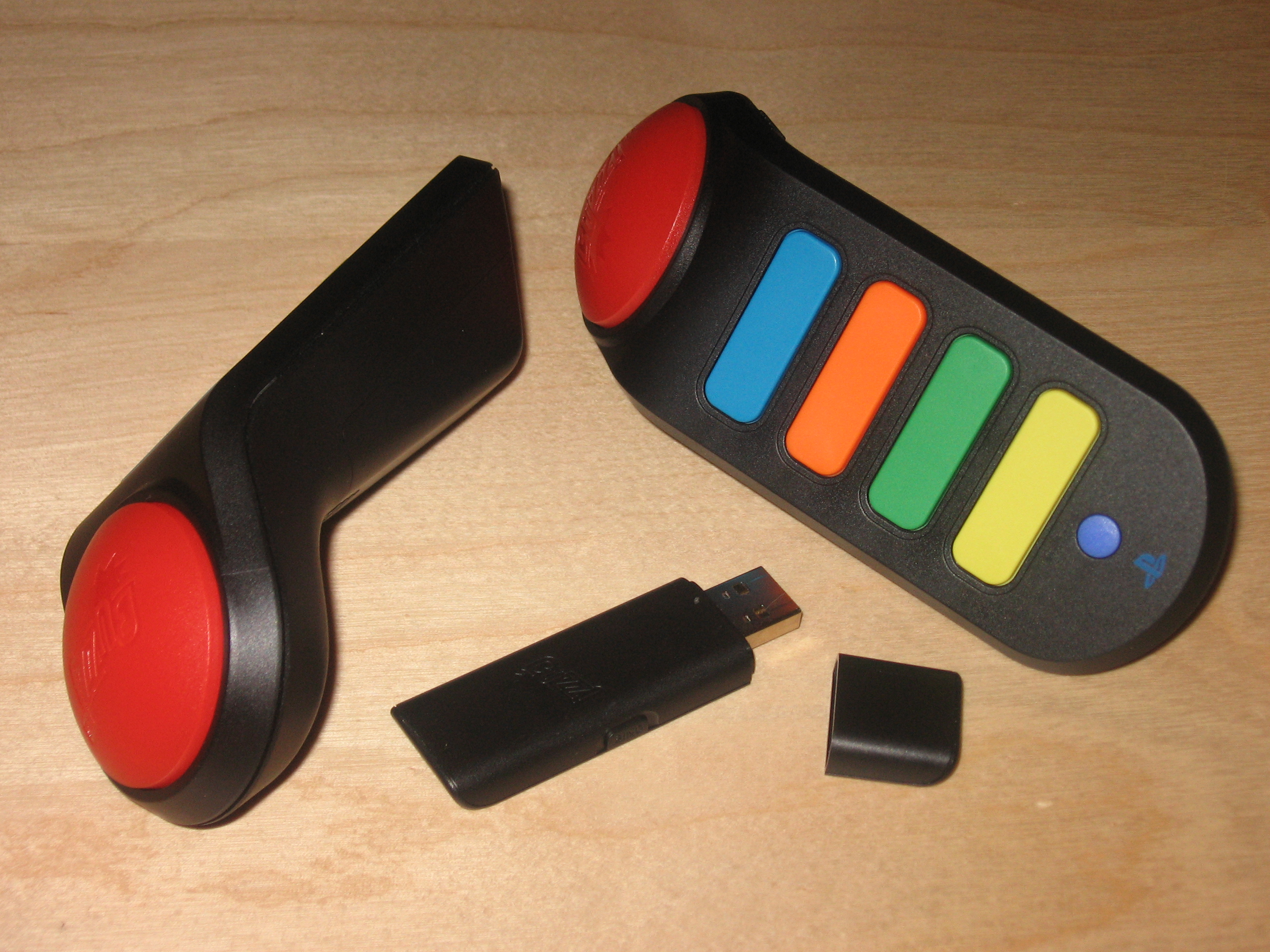
Wireless Buzzers and USB adapter

The Buzz! Buzzer is a special controller designed specifically for the Buzz! quiz game series. The controller features a large red buzzer button and four smaller coloured buttons for answer selection. Both wired and wireless versions are available and come bundled with Buzz! games. A four-buzzer set acts as a single USB device and connects a USB port on the PlayStation 3. Wireless versions connect via a USB dongle, with each dongle able to support up to 4 wireless buzzers at a time. A second dongle is required for additional buzzers (for 8 player games). Both the wired and wireless versions of the buzzers are compatible with both PlayStation 2 and PlayStation 3.

=== Logitech Driving Force GT ===
Released on December 13, 2007, the Logitech Driving Force GT is a PlayStation 3 racing wheel peripheral intended for use with racing games. It is manufactured and distributed by Logitech International S.A of Romanel-sur-Morges, Switzerland. It features include 900° steering (2.5 turns lock-to-lock), with force feedback, via a full-sized (diameter 45 cm), MOMO-styled steering wheel and full-sized throttle and brake pedals. It also features PlayStation 3 standard gamepad buttons (with gray colored,, and symbols), a PS/Home button (labeled PS), L3/R3 buttons, individually sprung to simulate real pedal efforts.

Other wheels include the Fanatec Porsche 911 Turbo S Racing Wheel, which features force feedback, 6 gear stick shifter and 3 pedals (Gas/Brake/Clutch).

=== Logitech Cordless Precision Controller ===
The Logitech Cordless Precision Controller has similar function with the Sixaxis and DualShock 3 wireless controllers except it has 2.4 GHz USB wireless technology that gives the user 30 feet (10 m) of room to play. The controller uses two AA batteries which provide up to 50 hours of continuous gaming. After five minutes of inactivity, the gamepad goes into sleep mode. The controller may also be used on a PC, as the dongle acts as a standard USB HID.

=== Blu-ray Disc remotes ===
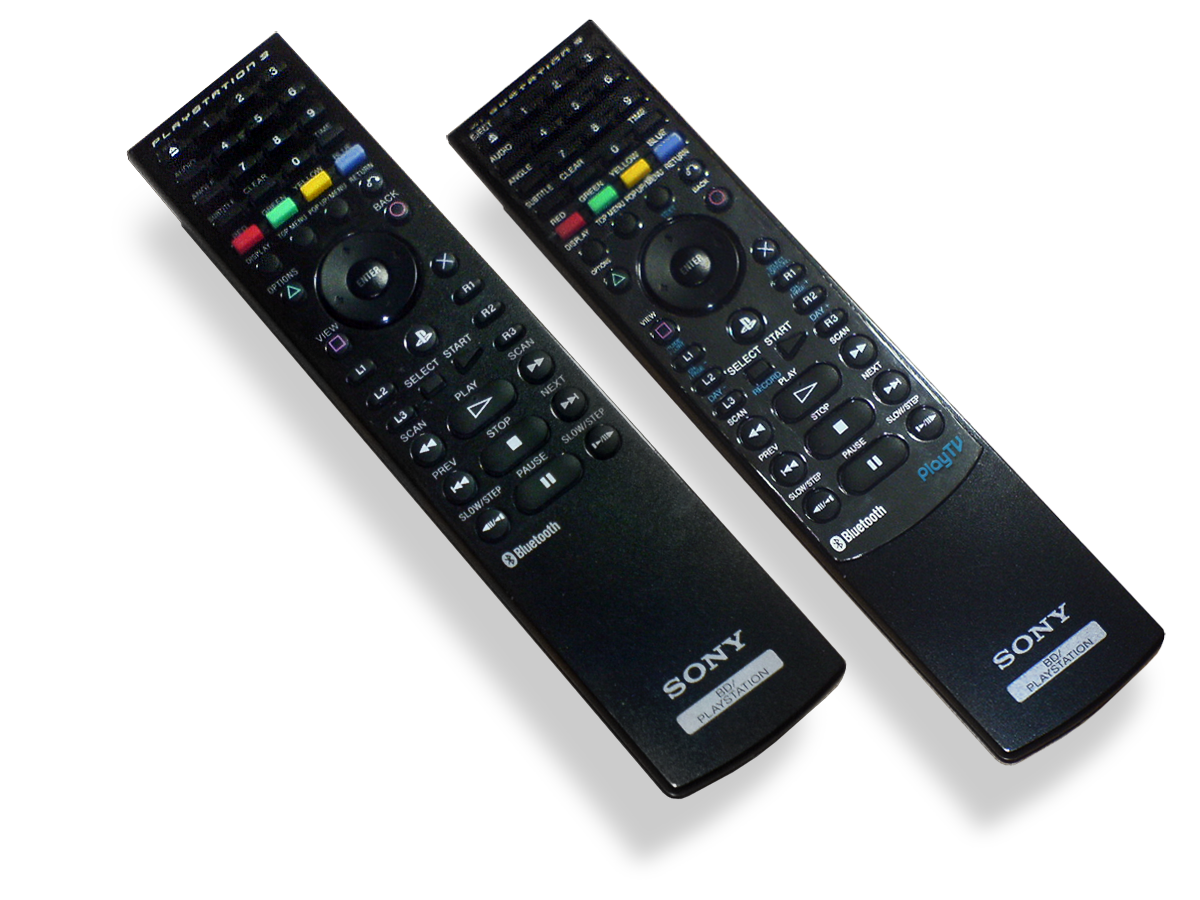
Blu-ray Disc Remote Control with and without PlayTV overlay

The PS3 is compatible with any Bluetooth Blu-ray Disc/DVD remote control. With a USB or Bluetooth adapter it is also compatible with many Blu-ray Disc/DVD and universal remote controls. Unlike the PS2, the PS3 does not have an infrared receiver; all compatible remote controls use Bluetooth instead.

The Blu-ray Disc Remote Control (CECH-ZR1x, where x is a region code) is a Bluetooth remote control which features standard Blu-ray Disc and DVD remote functions such as chapter display/select and one-touch menu control. In addition it has all standard PlayStation buttons: d-pad,,,,, L1, L2, L3, R1, R2, R3, Start, Select and a PS/Home button for turning on and off your PS3 and going to the XMB.

The Media/Blu-ray Disc Remote Control (CECH-ZRC1x, where x is a region code) controls the PlayStation 3, TV (including switching between 2D and 3D modes on 3D TVs), and audio system, has enhanced controls for Blu-ray Disc movies, streaming movies and music, and is compatible with streaming services available on the PS3 such as Netflix. It was released on October 24, 2011.

=== Rhythm game peripherals ===
Various rhythm game peripherals are available for the PlayStation 3, including guitar controllers, drum kit controllers, microphones, DJ turntables, and a keyboard controller. Most of these peripherals were produced for one of three franchises: Guitar Hero, Rock Band and SingStar.

=== uDraw GameTablet ===
The uDraw GameTablet is a graphics tablet designed to be used with various games. It was produced by THQ and released for the PlayStation 3 on November 15, 2011. The PlayStation 3 and Xbox 360 versions of the uDraw were a commercial failure and were discontinued in February 2012. THQ filed for bankruptcy the following year.

=== Tony Hawk Shred Board ===
A wireless skating board for Tony Hawk: Shred (and Ride) games. Replaces the previous Tony Hawk Ride Board, also by Activision. (The Ride board is not forward compatible with Shred.)

=== USB controllers ===
Most commercial USB controllers are compatible with the PlayStation 3 as it supports standard USB human interface devices. This includes gamepads, joysticks and steering wheel controllers. A limitation of this is that not all such controllers provide the same range of inputs as a Sixaxis/DualShock 3 controller (fewer buttons or joysticks for example), so may not be practical in all games. When any such controller is used with games which require sixaxis functionality or the use of the analog buttons usability is also limited. Many PlayStation 2 games which were programmed to use the analog functionality of the PlayStation 2 controllers buttons will not accept non-analog input therefore Sixaxis or DualShock 3 controllers must be used (though this could potentially be solved with future firmware updates).

Non-standard USB controllers such as Xbox 360 wired controllers are not compatible with the PlayStation 3. These often also require specific drivers for use on PCs (Windows XP and up).

=== Other compatible input devices ===
It is possible for game developers to add support for additional devices and title software updates can further add compatibility. Additionally most standard USB or Bluetooth keyboards and mice will also work on the PS3. A keyboard and mouse can be used to navigate the XMB or for use on the console's web browser. A keyboard and mouse will work in games specifically programmed to use them, and in backwards compatibility mode for supported PSOne and PS2 games.

== Audio/visual peripherals ==
=== Surround Bar ===
On October 13, 2010, Sony announced an official surround sound system for the PS3 through the official PlayStation YouTube channel.

=== Headsets ===
PlayStation 3 does not support game audio through USB headsets. However, most commercial USB headsets can be used for voice communication. In addition, the PlayStation 3 supports some PlayStation 2 USB accessories, including the USB SOCOM U.S. Navy SEALs headset by Logitech, the SingStar microphones and the built-in microphone on the EyeToy for video and voice chat (although the EyeToy Play game associated with the EyeToy is not available for use on European PlayStation 3s). Since the PlayStation 3 supports Bluetooth technology, any type of wireless headset is compatible with the system; however, Bluetooth wireless headsets are not compatible with PlayStation 2 games which use the USB headsets (due to being programmed for them only) and therefore the USB headsets must still be used (though this could potentially be solved with future firmware updates). On Sept. 12, 2007, Logitech announced new, Cordless Vantage Headset for PlayStation 3. The Blu-ray Disc retail version of Warhawk comes bundled with a Jabra BT125 Bluetooth headset in North America and the Jabra BT135 in Europe.

Mad Catz also produce a NASCAR/Dale Earnhardt Jr. headset in Amp and National Guard colors.

==== Official wireless Bluetooth headset ====
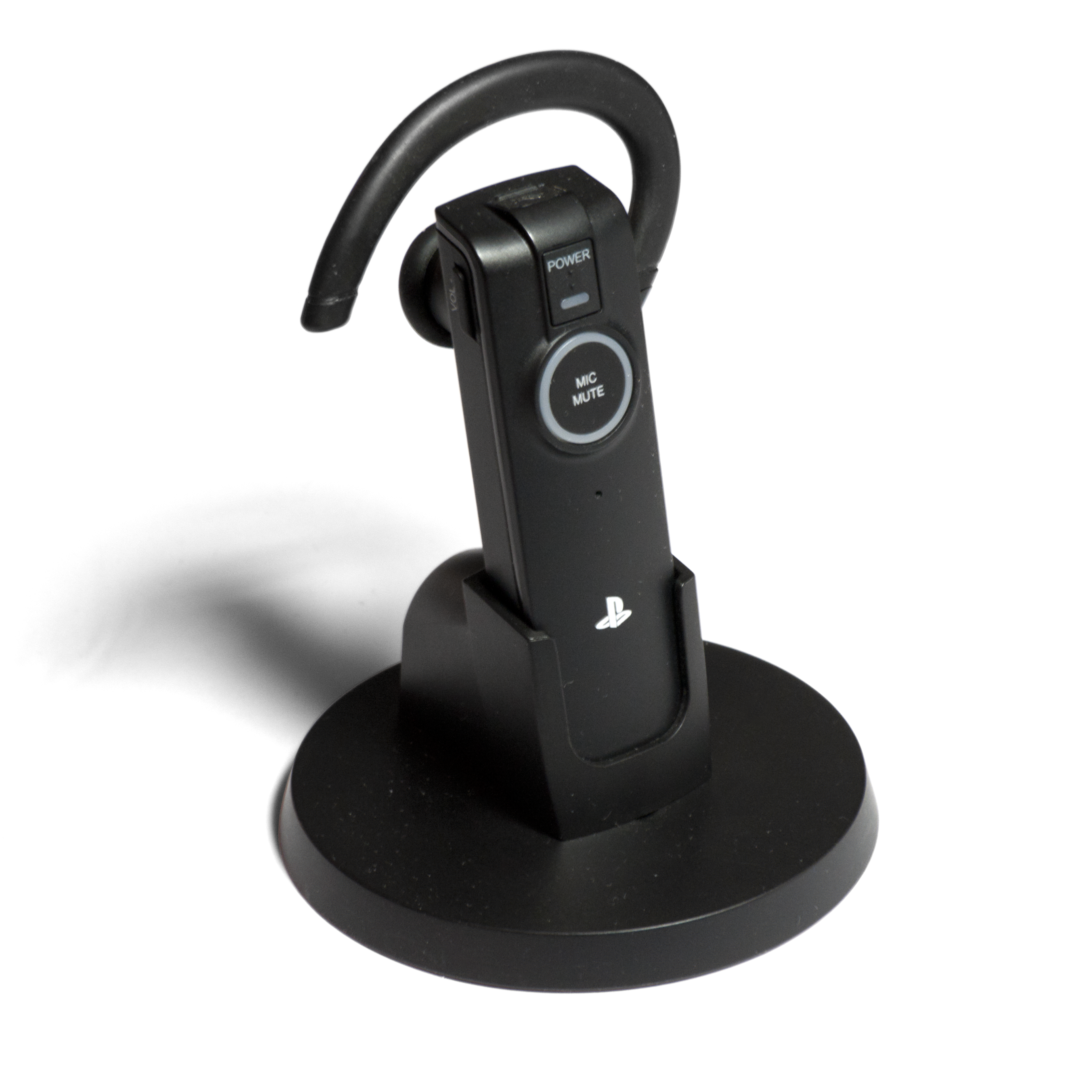
PlayStation 3 Wireless Bluetooth Headset

On June 27, 2008, it was announced that the headset that will be paired with the Blu-ray Disc version of SOCOM U.S. Navy SEALs: Confrontation would be the official Bluetooth headset for the PlayStation 3. It comes with a charging cradle so that it may charge while connected to one of the system's USB ports, which is being marketed as being useful for storing when not in use.

The official headset allows for high quality voice-chat, and provides volume level, battery level, charging status and connection status indicators on the PS3's on-screen display. The headset can be used as a microphone when docked in the charging cradle – voice output from PS3 is automatically transferred to the TV in this case. The official PS3 headset is also compatible with the PSP Go, as well as Bluetooth capable PCs and mobile phones.

In November 2010, Sony announced that it would be producing a new version of the Bluetooth headset, which is 30% smaller and would replace the existing model. The redesigned headset also features stronger noise cancellation technology. An "Urban Camouflage" version of the headset was released on April 19, 2011, in the US to coincide with the launch of SOCOM 4 U.S. Navy SEALs.

==== PlayStation 3 Wireless Stereo Headset ====
On September 6, 2011, Sony released their first wireless stereo headset which allows users to hear both in game audio and voice chat. The headset runs independent of HDMI, optical and A/V outputs, and instead connects wirelessly via a USB dongle (which can also be used to connect it to a PC or Mac). The headset requires system software update version 3.70. Other features include virtual surround sound (up to 7.1; media dependent) and on screen status notifications. Sony added an app for the PS3 and PS4 that allows the user to change the sound settings of the headset. Several game developers have created settings just for their games.

=== PlayTV ===
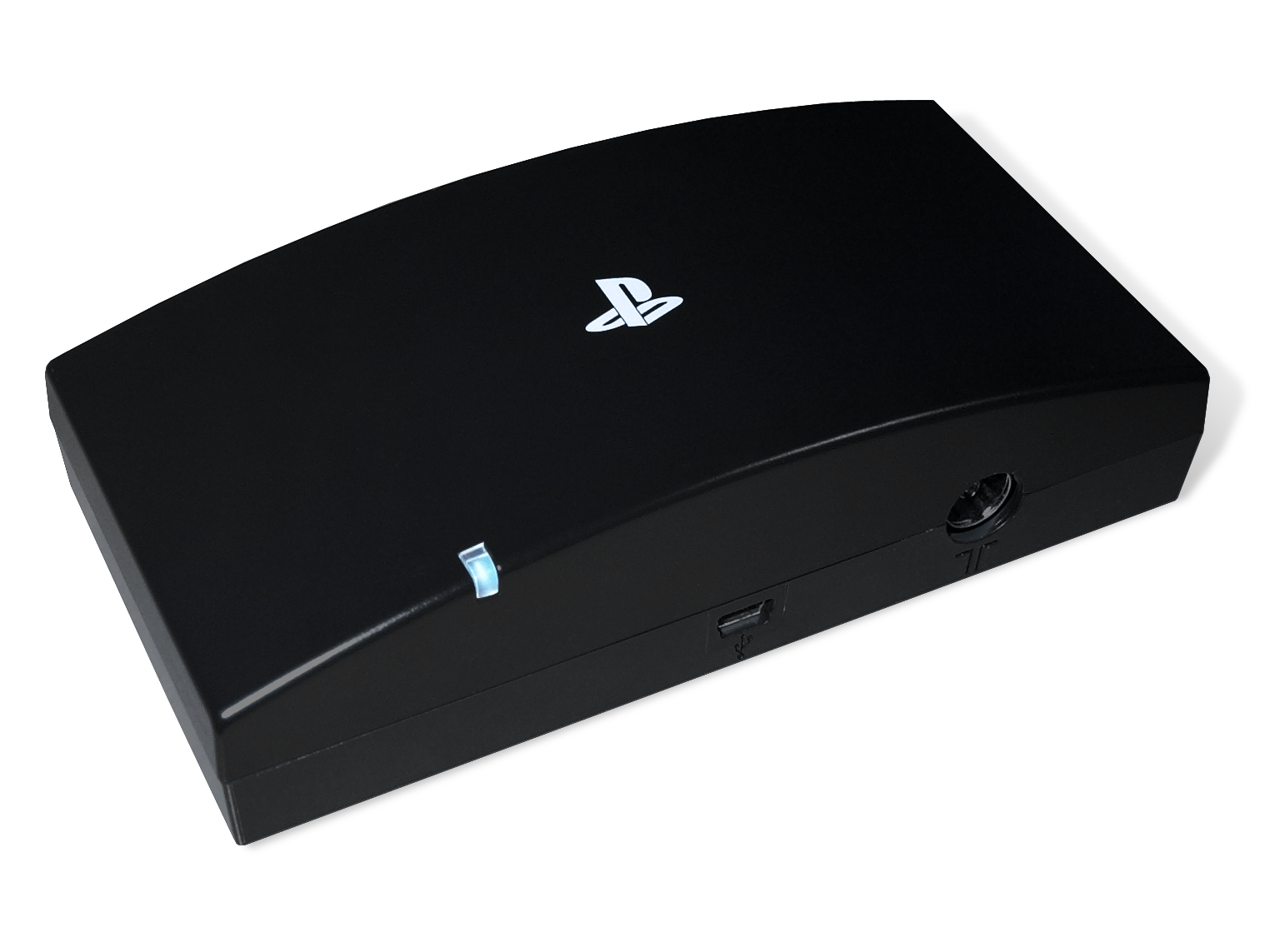
PlayTV tuner

Officially announced August 22, 2007; PlayTV is a twin-channel DVB-T tuner peripheral with digital video recorder (DVR) software which allows users to record television programs to the PlayStation 3 hard drive for later viewing even while playing a game. The device was launched in the UK on the September 19, 2008 with other regions in Europe following.

It can also be used on a PSP via Remote Play to watch live and recorded TV, and schedule new recordings.

It was reported that Australia would receive the PlayTV accessory only 2 months after Europe. However, after a year long delay, PlayTV was finally released in Australia on the November 27, 2009.

The PlayTV accessory comes bundled with an overlay sticker that fits onto the face of the Blu-ray Disc Remote Control to show PlayTV specific functions, which are mapped to the remote's existing buttons.

A similar device, known as Torne has been released for the Japanese market based on the Japanese ISDB-T digital terrestrial standard. Since North American markets, including the United States, Canada and Mexico, use the ATSC digital standard, neither the DVB-T based PlayTV device nor ISDB-T based Torne were released in these territories, or can be usable to pick up broadcasts.

=== torne ===
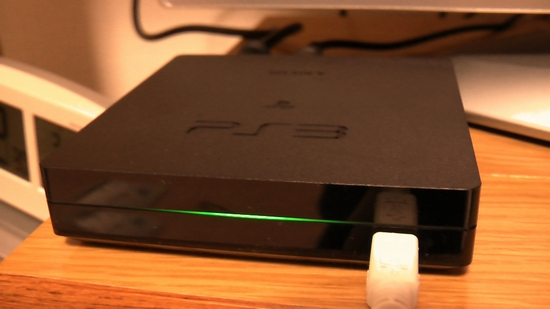
"torne" device for PS3.

torne (トルネ) (CECH-ZD1J) is an ISDB-T tuner peripheral for the Japanese market which, like PlayTV, comes with DVR software. It was first announced on January 14, 2010, for release on March 18 of the same year.

Like PlayTV, it is capable of recording and playing back live TV, even while in a game or playing other media (e.g. a DVD or Blu-ray Disc) and can be accessed on PSP via remote play.

Unlike PlayTV, torne features PS3 trophy support.

In June 2010 Sony released torne software version 2.00, which enables MPEG-4 AVC compression, allowing recordings to be compressed down to a third of their original size as captured MPEG-2 streams. It will also add the ability to watch, fast-forward and rewind programs while they are still recording and to update the user's PSN status.

=== PlayStation Eye ===
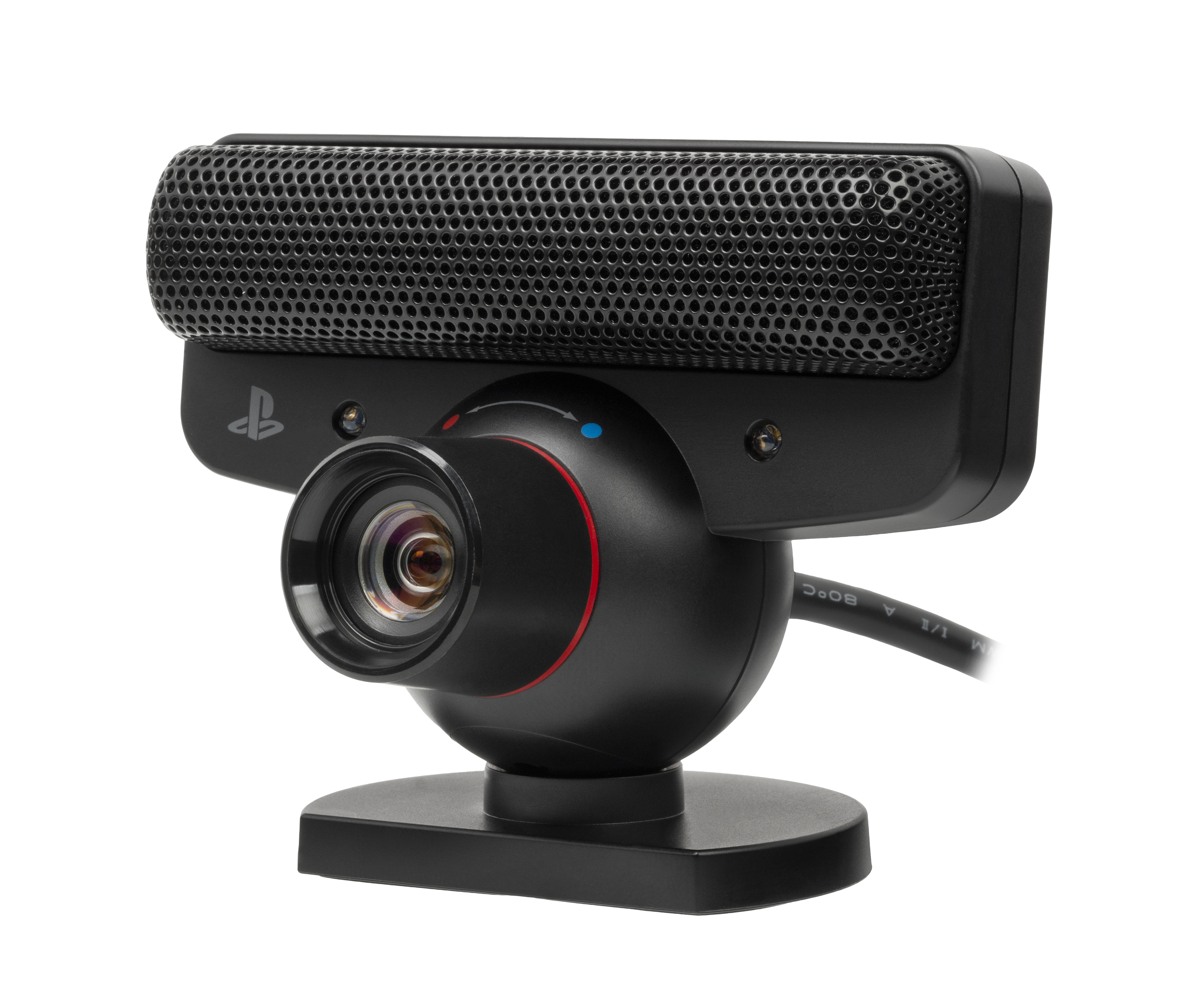
PlayStation Eye

The PlayStation Eye is an updated version of the EyeToy USB webcam designed for the PlayStation 3. It does not work with PS2 EyeToy games, but the PS3 does support the PlayStation 2 EyeToy, using its camera and microphone functionalities. A firmware update enabled the PlayStation 3 to support all USB webcams which used the USB Video Class.

=== A/V cables ===
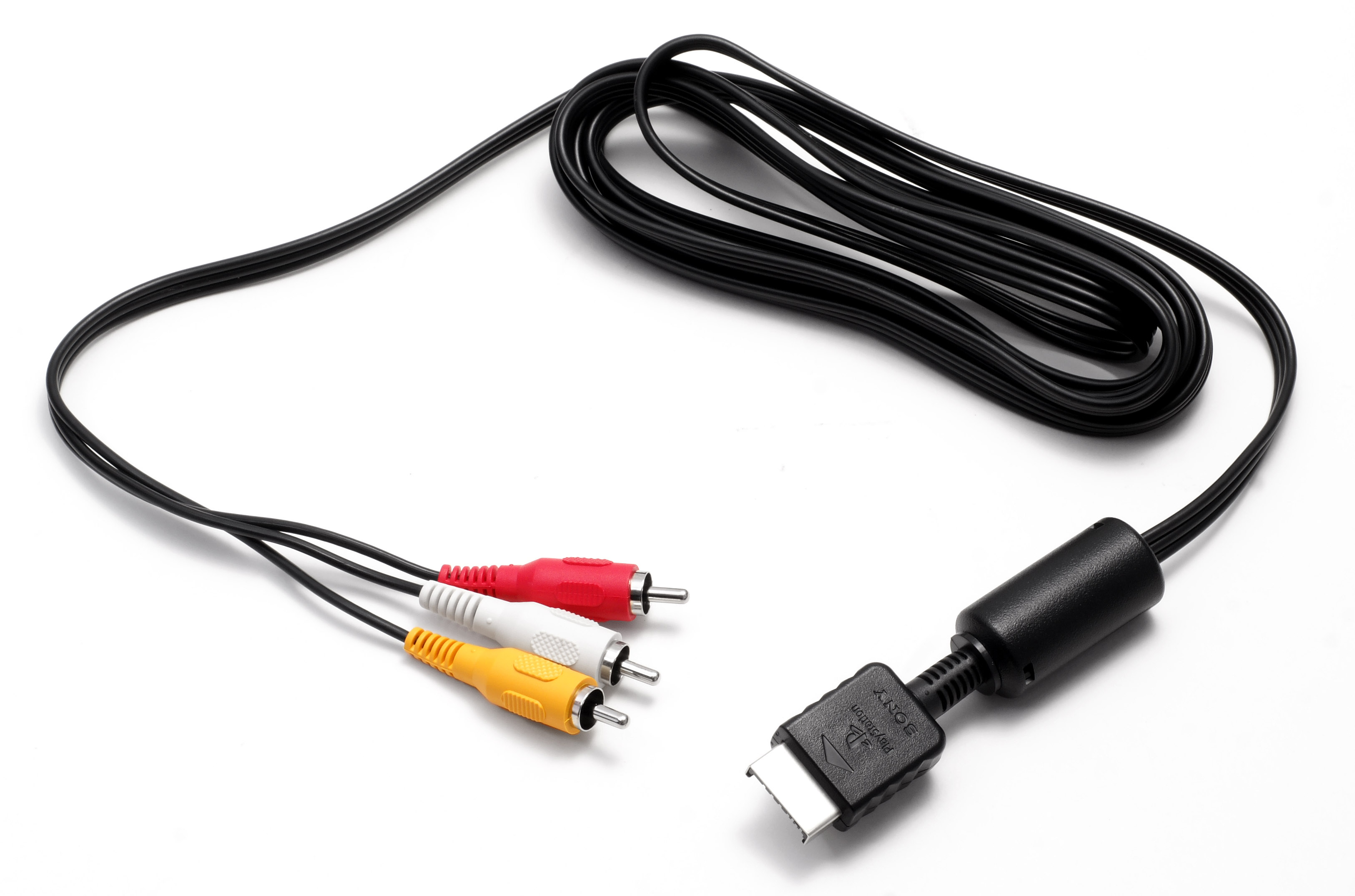
Composite A/V cable, bundled with most systems, for standard-definition video and stereo audio output.

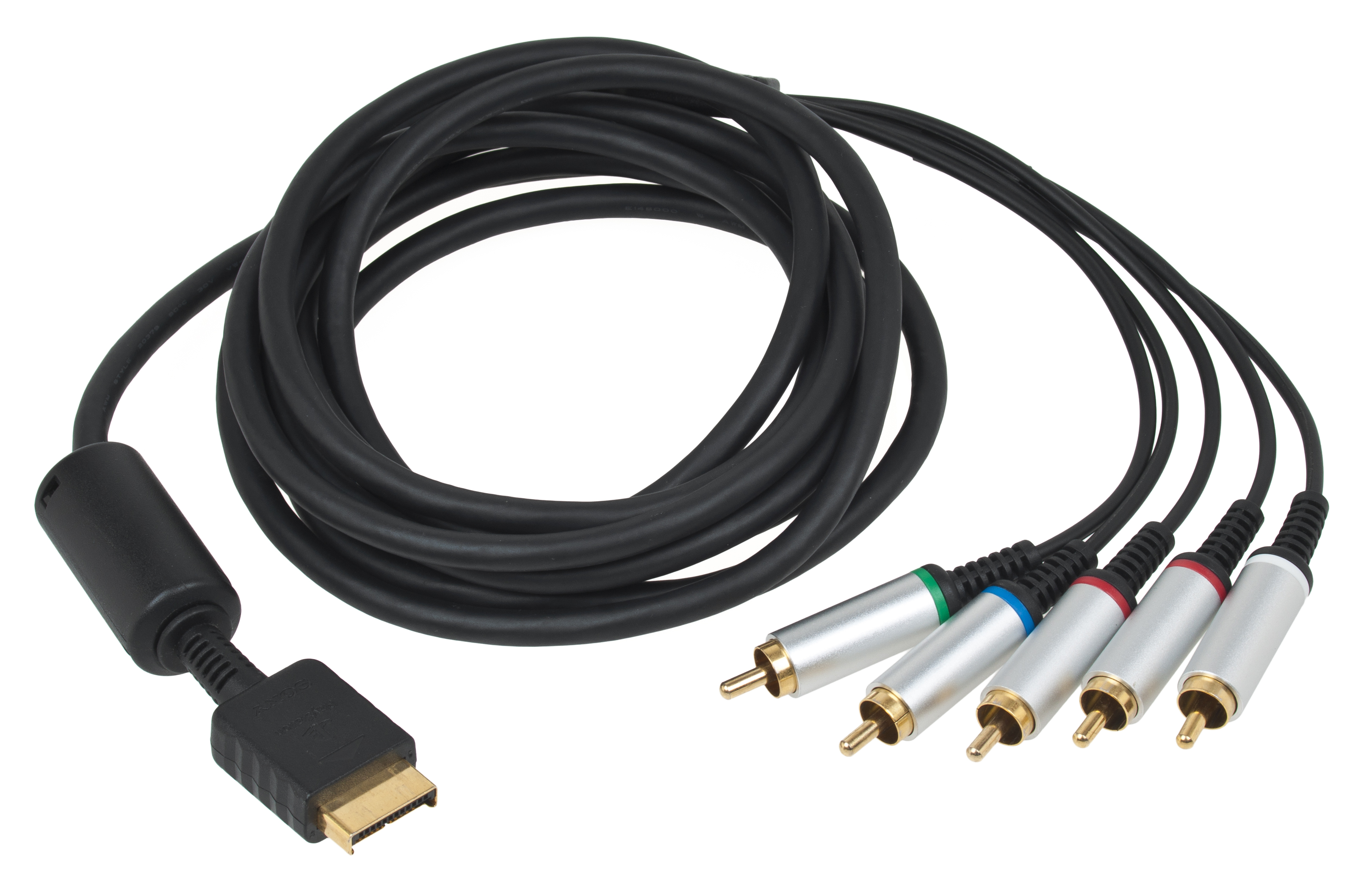
Component (YC_{B}C_{R}) cable, supporting analog stereo audio and HD video output up to 1080p on compatible displays.

The PlayStation 3 supports multiple audio and video output formats through three connectors: HDMI, TOSLINK (digital optical audio), and Sony's proprietary "A/V Multi Out" port. The Multi Out connector carries separate luma, chrominance, frame synchronization, and stereo audio signals, enabling compatibility with various analog video standards. Many official and third-party cables originally designed for the PlayStation and PlayStation 2 are also compatible with the PlayStation 3, including composite, S-Video, RGB SCART, and component video cables.

==== Video output capabilities ====
All PlayStation 3 systems support both standard-definition (SD) and high-definition (HD) video output, with specific formats depending on the region:

- NTSC models: 480i, 480p, 720p, 1080i, 1080p
- PAL models: 576i, 576p, 720p, 1080i, 1080p

NTSC systems cannot output PAL-formatted video (576i/576p), including games and DVDs, while PAL systems can display region-free NTSC DVDs. This regional limitation does not apply to HD output (720p and above), except for Blu-ray content, which remains subject to region coding.

The PlayStation 3 supports a range of video output methods:

- A/V Multi Out:
  - A/V Multi cable (VMC-AVM250) (Japan only): 576p, 576i, 480p, 480i
  - Component (YC_{B}C_{R}) AV cable (SCPH-10490): 1080p, 1080i, 720p, 576p, 576i, 480p, 480i
  - Composite AV cable (SCPH-10500) (included with most systems): 576i, 480i
  - D-Terminal AV cable (SCPH-10510) (Japan only): 1080p, 1080i, 720p, 576p, 576i, 480p, 480i
  - Euro-AV (SCART) cable (SCPH-10142) (Europe only, included in this region): 576p, 576i, 480p, 480i
  - S-Video cable (SCPH-10480): 576i, 480i
- HDMI: 1080p, 1080i, 720p, 576p, 480p, 480i

==== Audio output capabilities ====
The PlayStation 3 supports a range of audio output methods:

- A/V Multi Out: Analog 2.0 channel (stereo) audio
- Digital optical output (TOSLINK): 2.0 channel and 5.1 channel audio encoded in several formats: AAC, Dolby Digital, DTS, and Linear PCM at 44.1 kHz, 48 kHz, 88 kHz and 176.4 kHz. This output can be used in conjunction with analog or digital video, allowing flexible configuration with home theater systems.
- HDMI (version 1.3 and later): Supports 2.0, 5.1, and 7.1 channel audio, including high-definition audio formats such as Dolby Digital Plus, Dolby TrueHD, DTS-HD High Resolution Audio, DTS-HD Master Audio, and Linear PCM at 44.1 kHz, 48 kHz, 88 kHz, 96 kHz, 176.4 kHz and 192 kHz.

== Other accessories peripherals ==
=== Memory card adapter ===
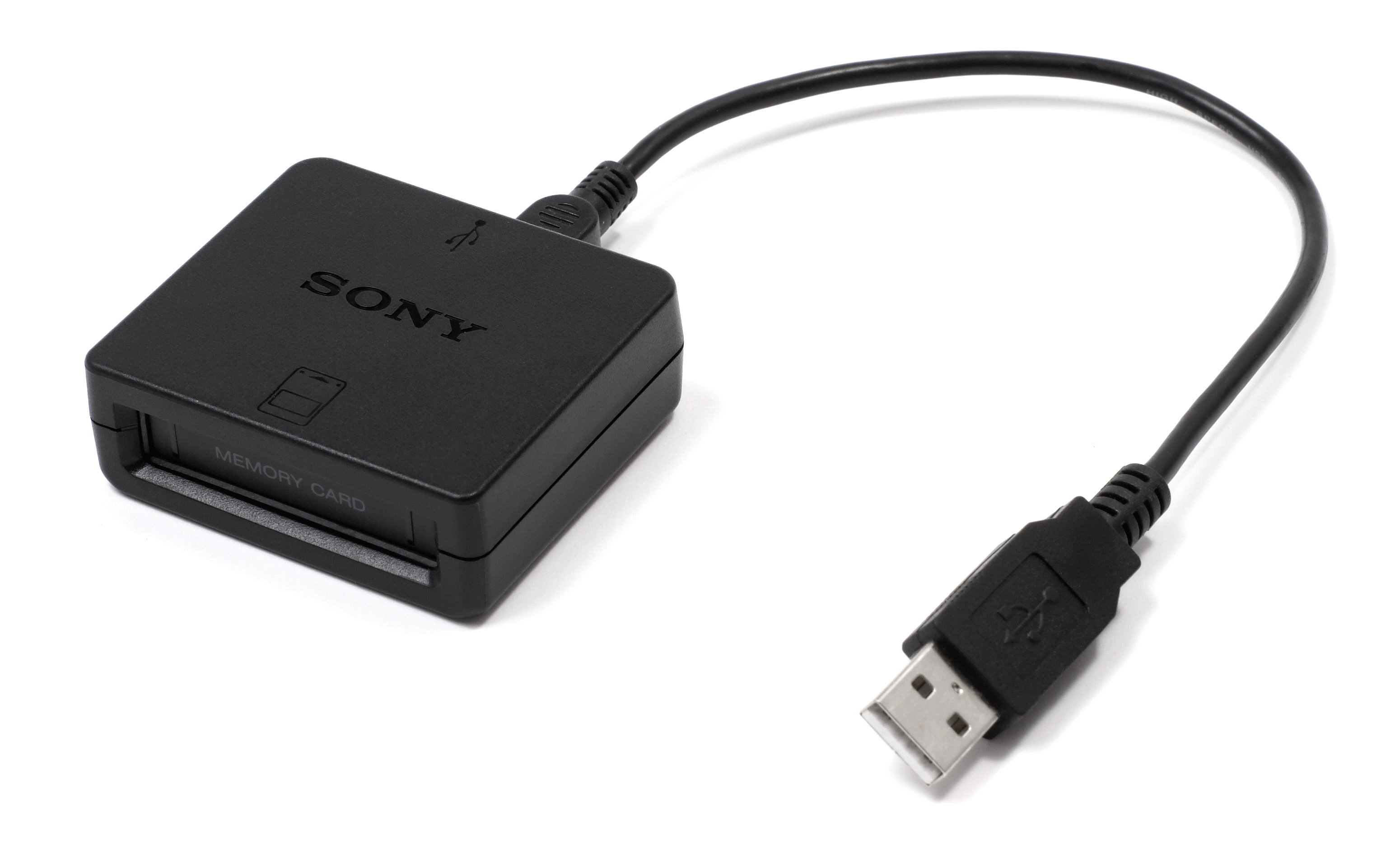
Memory Card Adapter

The PlayStation 3 Memory Card Adapter (CECHZM1) is a device that allows data to be transferred from a PlayStation or PlayStation 2 memory card to the PlayStation 3's hard disk. At launch, the device did not support transferring saved game files back to a memory card, but upon the release of the PlayStation 3 system software version 1.80, the user is now able to transfer PS1 and PS2 game saves from the PS3 directly onto a physical Memory Card via the adapter. PlayStation 2 saved game files can also be transferred between PlayStation 3 users via other current memory card formats. The device connects to the PlayStation 3's USB port on one end through a USB Mini-B cable (not included with adapter, but it was included with the console itself), and features a PlayStation 2 memory card port on the other end. The adapter works with every PlayStation 3 model, regardless of whether it is compatible with PlayStation 2 games or not. The adapter was available for purchase simultaneously with the console's launch. The Memory Card Adapter was released on 25 May 2007 in the UK.

=== AC adapter charging kit ===
The AC adapter (CECHZA1) charging kit allows the charging of two USB-powered devices, such as the DualShock 3, Sixaxis, PSP (2000, 3000 and Go models), wireless keypad and wireless headset via a wall power plug, eliminating the need to have a PS3 running to charge the accessories. It includes an AC adapter, one 1.5m/4.92 ft. long USB cable (Type A – Mini-B) and one 2 m/6.56 ft long AC power cable.

=== Printers ===
Canon, Epson, and Hewlett-Packard each have several printers which are compatible with the system.

== See also ==
- DualShock
