= Thorn Lake (Portage County, Wisconsin) =

Lake in the state of Wisconsin, United States

- Location within Wisconsin Location within the United States
- Location: Portage County, Wisconsin
- Coordinates: 44°25′31″N 89°13′59″W
- Type: lake
- Etymology: named after Alex Thorn, an early settler
- Surface elevation: 988 feet (301 m)

Thorn Lake is a 12 acre lake in the U.S. state of Wisconsin. It has a maximum depth of 25 feet.

Thorn Lake was named after Alex Thorn, an early settler.
