= Thorn tree =

Thorn tree may refer to:

- The common name for several species of trees in tropical or temperate climates that have spiky, thornlike leaves, e.g. the Acacia and the boxthorn (Lycium)
- Thorntree, a housing estate in the town of Middlesbrough, in North East England
- A long-running travel-related discussion forum on the Web site of Lonely Planet.
