= List of games compatible with EyeToy =

This article provides a list of games that are compatible with the EyeToy camera peripheral on the PlayStation 2.

== EyeToy specific games ==
These games require the EyeToy to be played.

Game title	Year released	Developer	Publisher
EyeToy: Play	July 4, 2003 (Europe); November 4, 2003 (North America) February 11, 2004 (Japan)	London Studio	Sony Computer Entertainment
EyeToy: Groove	November 14, 2003 (Europe); April 20, 2004 (North America) June 24, 2004 (Japan)	London Studio	Sony Computer Entertainment
Kaiketsu Zorori Mezase! Itazura King	April 28, 2004 (Japan)	Bandai	Bandai
U-Move Super Sports	July 15, 2004 (Japan); October 22, 2004 (Europe)	Konami	Konami
EyeToy: Monkey Mania	August 4, 2004 (Japan); March 18, 2005 (Europe)	Japan Studio	Sony Computer Entertainment
Nicktoons Movin'	October 21, 2004 (North America); November 26, 2004 (Europe)	Mass Media	THQ
Sega Superstars	October 22, 2004 (Europe); November 2, 2004 (North America); November 11, 2004 (Japan)	Sonic Team	Sega
EyeToy: AntiGrav	November 9, 2004 (North America); March 2005 (Europe)	Harmonix	Sony Computer Entertainment
EyeToy: Play 2	November 5, 2004 (Europe); August 16, 2005 (North America) 16 June 2005 (Japan)	London Studio	Sony Computer Entertainment
Bakufuu Slash! Kizna Arashi	November 14, 2004 (Japan)	Sony Computer Entertainment	Sony Computer Entertainment
Disney Move	November 19, 2004 (Europe)	Artificial Mind & Movement	Buena Vista Games
Card Captor Sakura: Sakura-Chan to Asobo!	December 2, 2004 (Japan)	NHK Software	NHK Software
Bobobo-bo Bo-bobo Assemble! Motion Bo-bobo	December 16, 2004 (Japan)	Hudson Soft	Hudson Soft
EyeToy: EduKids	January 20, 2005 (Korea)	SCE Korea; Arisu Media	Sony Computer Entertainment Korea
EyeToy: Chat	February 11, 2005 (Europe)	London Studio	Sony Computer Entertainment Europe
EyeToy: Tales	March 2005 (Korea)	SCE Korea	Sony Computer Entertainment Korea
Onmyou Taisenki - Byakko Enbu	March 31, 2005 (Japan)	Matrix Software	Bandai
C@M-Station	April 28, 2005	Arduc	Arduc
YetiSports Arctic Adventures	July 2005 (Europe)	Pirate Games	JoWooD Productions
EyeToy: Kinetic	September 23, 2005 (Europe); November 8, 2005 (North America)	London Studio	Sony Computer Entertainment
SpyToy	October 14, 2005 (Europe); November 15, 2005 (North America)	London Studio	Sony Computer Entertainment
EyeToy: Play 3	November 4, 2005 (Europe)	London Studio	Sony Computer Entertainment Europe
Rhythmic Star!	March 10, 2006 (Europe)	Namco	Ignition Entertainment/Namco
Clumsy Shumsy	October 27, 2006 (Europe)	Phoenix Games	Phoenix Games
EyeToy: Kinetic Combat	November 17, 2006 (Europe)	London Studio	Sony Computer Entertainment Europe
EyeToy Play: Sports	December 31, 2006 (Europe)	London Studio	Sony Computer Entertainment Europe
Bob the Builder	August 23, 2007 (Europe)	Atomic Planet Entertainment	Mastertronic Group
Thomas & Friends: A Day at the Races	August 24, 2007 (Europe)	Broadsword Interactive	Mastertronic Group
EyeToy Play: Astro Zoo	November 2, 2007 (Europe)	London Studio	Sony Computer Entertainment Europe
EyeToy Play: Hero	2008 (Europe)	London Studio	Sony Computer Entertainment Europe
EyeToy Play: PomPom Party	2008 (Europe)	London Studio	Sony Computer Entertainment Europe

== EyeToy Enhanced Games ==
These games may be used with the EyeToy optionally. They have an "EyeToy Enhanced" label on the box.

- AFL Premiership 2005 (Sony. Also see section Cameo.)
- Buzz! The Music Quiz (Sony, late 2005)
- Buzz! The Big Quiz (Sony, March 2006)
- Buzz! The Mega Quiz - Multiplayer mode
- Dance Dance Revolution Extreme (North America) (Konami, 2004) - EyeToy mini games, "hands and feet" mode, and the ability to see yourself dancing.
- DDR Festival Dance Dance Revolution (Konami, 2004) - EyeToy mini games, "hands and feet" mode, and the ability to see yourself dancing.
- Dancing Stage Fusion (Konami, 2004) - EyeToy mini games, "hands and feet" mode, and the ability to see yourself dancing.
- Dance Dance Revolution Extreme 2 (Konami, 2005) - EyeToy mini games, "hands and feet" mode, and the ability to see yourself dancing.
- Dancing Stage Max (Konami, 2005) - EyeToy mini games, "hands and feet" mode, and the ability to see yourself dancing.
- Dance Dance Revolution Strike (Konami, 2006) - EyeToy mini games, "hands and feet" mode, and the ability to see yourself dancing.
- Dance Dance Revolution SuperNova (North America) (Konami, 2006) - EyeToy mini games, "hands and feet" mode, and the ability to see yourself dancing.
- Dance Dance Revolution SuperNova (Konami, 2007) - EyeToy mini games, "hands and feet" mode, and the ability to see yourself dancing.
- Dancing Stage SuperNova (Europe) (Konami, 2007) - EyeToy mini games, "hands and feet" mode, and the ability to see yourself dancing.
- Dance Dance Revolution SuperNova 2 (North America) (Konami, 2007) - EyeToy mini games, "hands and feet" mode, and the ability to see yourself dancing.
- Dance Dance Revolution SuperNova 2 (Konami, 2008) - EyeToy mini games, "hands and feet" mode, and the ability to see yourself dancing.
- Dance Factory - players can optionally see themselves dancing, additional mode with 2 camera targets.
- DT Racer (XS Games, 2005) - photo taken by EyeToy can be used as a custom avatar
- Formula One 05 (Sony, mid-2004)
- Flow: Urban Dance Uprising
- Go! Puzzle (Sony, June 2007) - For PlayStation 3
- Get on da Mic (Eidos, 2004) - players can see their performance
- Harry Potter and the Prisoner of Azkaban (Electronic Arts, 2004) - features EyeToy minigames
- Jackie Chan Adventures (Sony, 2004) - features EyeToy minigames
- Lemmings (Team17, 2006) - only 20 levels are EyeToy compatible
- LittleBigPlanet (Media Molecule, 2008) - players can take pictures to be used as in-game stickers for placement on walls and other surfaces
- LMA Manager 2005 (Codemasters, 2004) - players can have their pictures on in-game newspapers
- NBA 07
- Racing Battle: C1 Grand Prix (Genki, 2005) - Used to capture textures to be used as car stickers in the bodypaint interface
- SingStar series (Sony, 2004-2009) - singers can optionally see themselves when singing
- The Sims 2 (Electronic Arts, 2005) - The player can take a picture of themselves, which Sims can paint as a piece of artwork
- Stuart Little 3: Big Photo Adventure
- The Polar Express (THQ, 2004) - features some EyeToy minigames
- The Sims 2: Pets
- The Urbz: Sims in the City (EA, 2004) - players can have their faces on in-game billboards
- Tony Hawk's Underground 2
- YetiSports Arctic Adventures (JoWooD Productions, 2005) - Features exclusive EyeToy multi-player games. The packaging claims it only works with the EyeToy but it isn't.
- Who Wants to be a Millionaire? Party Edition (Eidos Interactive, late 2006) - players can have their 'mugshots' on a winning check (Also supports Buzz! Buzzers)

== EyeToy Cameo ==
EyeToy: Cameo is a system for allowing players to include their own images as avatars in other games. Games that support the feature include a head scanning program that can be used to generate a 3D model of the player's head. Once stored on a memory card, this file is then available in games that support the Cameo feature. EyeToy: Cameo licenses the head creation technology Digimask.

=== Supported games ===
- AFL Premiership 2005
- AFL Premiership 2006
- AND 1 Streetball
- CMT Presents: Karaoke Revolution Country
- EyeToy: Kinetic
- EyeToy: Play
- EyeToy: Play 2
- EyeToy: Play 3
- Eyetoy: Hero
- Formula One 05
- Gaelic Games: Football
- Gretzky NHL 2005
- Karaoke Revolution Party
- Karaoke Revolution Presents: American Idol
- MLB 2005
- MLB '06: The Show
- MLB '07: The Show
- MLB '08: The Show
- MLB '09: The Show
- This Is Football 2005
- Tony Hawk's Underground 2
- Tony Hawk's American Wasteland
- World Tour Soccer 2006
