= Index of Windows games (Y) =

This is an index of Microsoft Windows games.

This list has been split into multiple pages. Please use the Table of Contents to browse it.

Title	Released	Developer	Publisher
Y2K: The Game	1999	Runecraft	Interplay Entertainment
Yager	2003	Yager Entertainment	Kemco, THQ
Yakuza 0	2018	Ryu Ga Gotoku Studio	Sega
Yakuza 3	2021	Ryu Ga Gotoku Studio	Sega
Yakuza 4	2021	Ryu Ga Gotoku Studio	Sega
Yakuza 5	2021	Ryu Ga Gotoku Studio	Sega
Yakuza 6: The Song of Life	2021	Ryu Ga Gotoku Studio	Sega
Yakuza Kiwami	2019	Ryu Ga Gotoku Studio	Sega
Yakuza Kiwami 2	2019	Ryu Ga Gotoku Studio	Sega
Yakuza: Like a Dragon	2020	Ryu Ga Gotoku Studio	Sega
Yamaha Supercross	2008	Aurona Games, Coyote Console	DSI Games, Zoo Digital Publishing
Yapyap	2026	Maison Bap	Maison Bap
Year Walk	2014	Simogo	Simogo
Yellow Taxi Goes Vroom	2024	Panik Arcade	Those Awesome Guys
Yes, Your Grace	2020	Brave at Night	No More Robots
Yogurting	2005	NTIX Soft, Neowiz	GungHo
Yoku's Island Express	2018	Villa Gorilla	Team17
Yooka-Laylee	2017	Playtonic Games	Team17
You Are Empty	2006	Mandel ArtPlains, Digital Spray Studios	1C Company
Yourself!Fitness	2004	Respondesign	Respondesign
