= EyeToy =

Webcam for the PlayStation 2

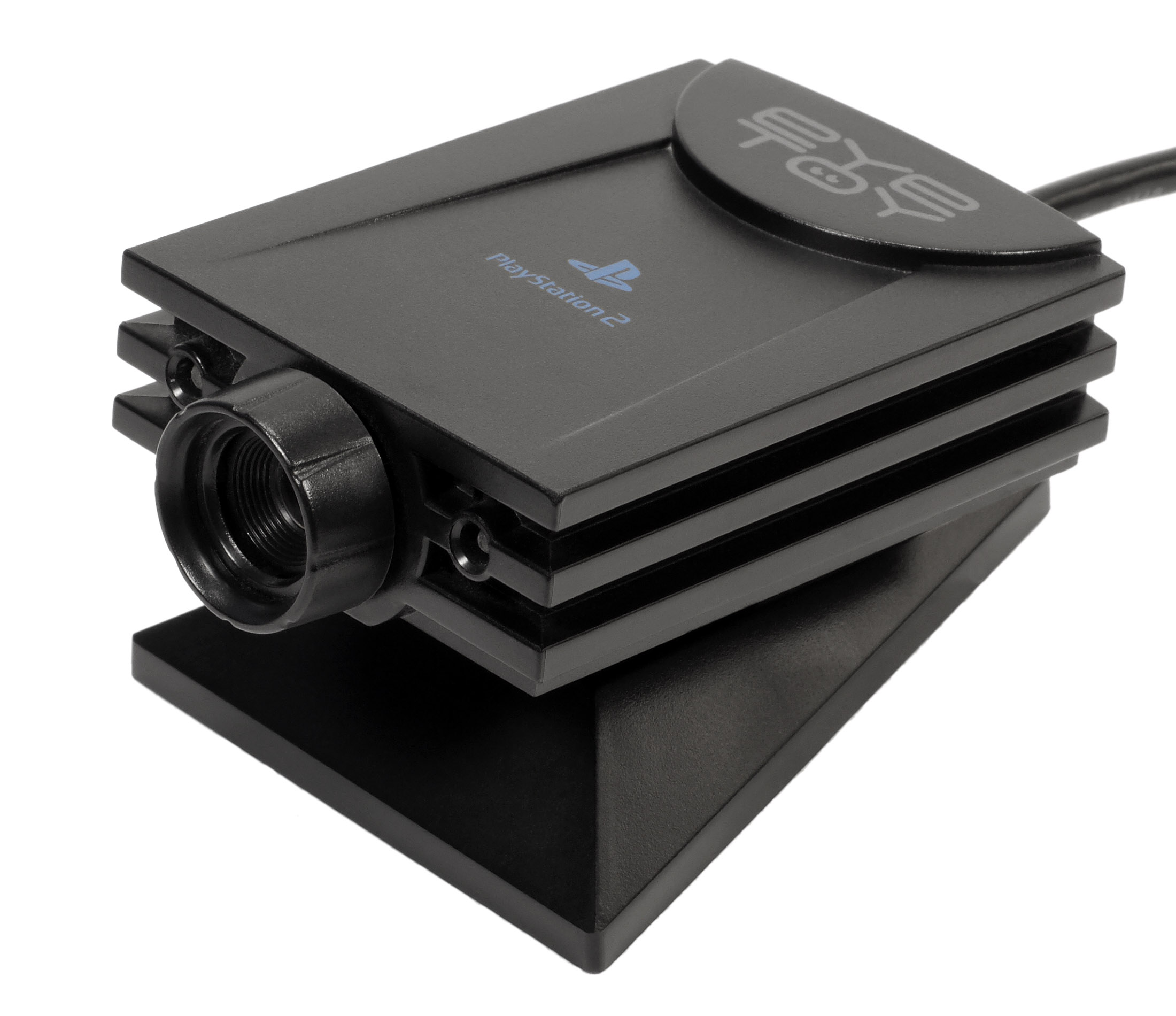
- EyeToy Camera in blackish gray
- Developer: Sony Computer Entertainment
- Manufacturer: Logitech, Namtai, Chicony Electronics
- Product family: PlayStation
- Type: Webcam
- Generation: Sixth
- Released: 2003
- Camera: 320×240 pixels, capable of 640×480 pixels with custom drivers.
- Connectivity: USB 1.1 (type-A)
- Platform: PlayStation 2
- Dimensions: 44×53×89 mm (1.7×2.1×3.5 in)
- Weight: 173 g (6.1 oz)
- Cable length: 2 m (6.6 ft)
- Power draw: 50 mA
- Lenshead: Manual focus ring
- Sensor: OV7648
- Chip: OV519
- Successor: PlayStation Eye

The EyeToy is a color webcam for use with the PlayStation 2. Supported games use computer vision and gesture recognition to process images taken by the EyeToy. This allows players to interact with the games using motion, color detection, and also sound, through its built-in microphone. It was released in 2003 and in total, it has 10.5 million sales.

The camera was manufactured by Logitech, although most newer EyeToys were manufactured by Namtai. The model "SCEH-0004" was manufactured either by Namtai or Chicony. The camera is mainly used for playing EyeToy games developed by Sony and other companies. It is not intended for use as a normal PC camera, although some programmers have written unofficial drivers for it. The EyeToy is compatible with the PlayStation 3 and can be used for video chatting. As of November 6, 2008, the EyeToy has sold 10.5 million units worldwide.

== History ==
The EyeToy was conceived by Richard Marks in 1999, after witnessing a demonstration of the PlayStation 2 at the 1999 Game Developers Conference in San Jose, California. Marks' idea was to enable natural user interface and mixed reality video game applications using an inexpensive webcam, using the computational power of the PlayStation 2 to implement computer vision and gesture recognition technologies. He joined Sony Computer Entertainment America (SCEA) that year, and worked on the technology as Special Projects Manager for Research and Development.

Marks' work drew the attention of Phil Harrison, then Vice President of Third Party Relations and Research and Development at SCEA. Soon after being promoted to Senior Vice President of Product Development at Sony Computer Entertainment Europe (SCEE) in 2000, Harrison brought Marks to the division's headquarters in London to demonstrate the technology to a number of developers. At the demonstration, Marks was joined with Ron Festejo of Psygnosis (which would later merge to become London Studio) to begin developing a software title using the technology, which would later become EyeToy: Play. Originally called the iToy (short for "interactive toy") by the London branch, the webcam was later renamed to the EyeToy by Harrison. It was first demonstrated to the public at the PlayStation Experience event in August 2002 with four minigames.

Already planned for release in Europe, the EyeToy was picked by SCE's Japanese and American branches after the successful showing at the PlayStation Experience. In 2003, EyeToy was released in a bundle with EyeToy: Play: in Europe on July 4, and in North America on November 4. By the end of the year, the EyeToy sold over 2 million units in Europe and 400,000 units in the United States. On February 11, 2004, the EyeToy was released in Japan.

== Design ==
The camera is mounted on a pivot, allowing for positioning. Focusing the camera is performed by rotating a ring around the lens. It comes with two LED lights on the front. A blue light turns on when the PS2 is on, indicating that it is ready to be used, while the red light flashes when there is insufficient light in the room. It also contains a built-in microphone.

The original logo and product design for the camera was designed by Sony employee Oliver Wright. A second, newer model of the EyeToy was also made, but sports a smaller size and silver casing. Apart from smaller electronics, no internal improvements had been made to the new model, and its functionality stayed the same as the old EyeToy.

== Use with personal computers ==
Since the EyeToy is essentially a webcam inside a casing designed to match the PlayStation 2 and it uses a USB 1.1 protocol and USB plug, it is possible to make it work on other systems relatively easily. Drivers have been created to make it work with many computer operating systems, however, Linux is the only OS that has drivers installed yet no official drivers have been offered by Namtai, Logitech, or Sony for Microsoft Windows, macOS, or Linux. The type of driver required depends on the model of the EyeToy camera. There are three different models:

- SLEH-00030
- SLEH-00031
- SCEH-0004

The model information is included in a label on the bottom of the camera.

In these custom drivers, the red LED that normally signals inadequate lighting is used as the active recording indicator. The blue LED is lit when the EyeToy is plugged into the computer.

== Games ==
=== Designed for EyeToy ===
The following 28 games require the EyeToy to play.

Game title	Year released	Developer	Publisher
EyeToy: Play	July 4, 2003 (Europe); November 4, 2003 (North America)	London Studio	Sony Computer Entertainment
EyeToy: Groove	November 14, 2003 (Europe); April 20, 2004 (North America)	London Studio	Sony Computer Entertainment
Kaiketsu Zorori Mezase! Itazura King	April 28, 2004 (Japan)	Bandai	Bandai
U-Move Super Sports	July 15, 2004 (Japan); October 22, 2004 (Europe)	Konami	Konami
EyeToy: Monkey Mania	August 4, 2004 (Japan); March 18, 2005 (Europe)	Japan Studio	Sony Computer Entertainment
Nicktoons Movin'	October 21, 2004 (North America); November 26, 2004 (Europe)	Mass Media	THQ
Sega Superstars	October 22, 2004 (Europe); November 2, 2004 (North America); November 11, 2004 (Japan)	Sonic Team	Sega
EyeToy: AntiGrav	November 9, 2004 (North America); March 2005 (Europe)	Harmonix	Sony Computer Entertainment
EyeToy: Play 2	November 5, 2004 (Europe); August 16, 2005 (North America)	London Studio	Sony Computer Entertainment
Bakufuu Slash! Kizna Arashi	November 14, 2004 (Japan)	Sony Computer Entertainment	Sony Computer Entertainment
Disney Move	November 19, 2004 (Europe)	Artificial Mind & Movement	Buena Vista Games
Card Captor Sakura: Sakura-Chan to Asobo!	December 2, 2004 (Japan)	NHK Software	NHK Software
Bobobo-bo Bo-bobo Assemble! Motion Bo-bobo	December 16, 2004 (Japan)	Hudson Soft	Hudson Soft
EyeToy: EduKids	January 20, 2005 (Korea)	SCE Korea; Arisu Media	Sony Computer Entertainment Korea
EyeToy: Chat	February 11, 2005 (Europe)	London Studio	Sony Computer Entertainment Europe
EyeToy: Tales	March 2005 (Korea)	SCE Korea	Sony Computer Entertainment Korea
Onmyou Taisenki - Byakko Enbu	March 31, 2005 (Japan)	Matrix Software	Bandai
C@M-Station	April 28, 2005	Arduc	Arduc
YetiSports Arctic Adventures	July 2005 (Europe)	Pirate Games	JoWooD Productions
EyeToy: Kinetic	September 23, 2005 (Europe); November 8, 2005 (North America)	London Studio	Sony Computer Entertainment
SpyToy	October 14, 2005 (Europe); November 15, 2005 (North America)	London Studio	Sony Computer Entertainment
EyeToy: Play 3	November 4, 2005 (Europe)	London Studio	Sony Computer Entertainment Europe
Rhythmic Star!	March 10, 2006 (Europe)	Namco	Ignition Entertainment/Namco
Clumsy Shumsy	October 27, 2006 (Europe)	Phoenix Games	Phoenix Games
EyeToy: Kinetic Combat	November 17, 2006 (Europe)	London Studio	Sony Computer Entertainment Europe
EyeToy Play: Sports	December 31, 2006 (Europe)	London Studio	Sony Computer Entertainment Europe
Bob the Builder	August 23, 2007 (Europe)	Atomic Planet Entertainment	Mastertronic Group
Thomas & Friends: A Day at the Races	August 24, 2007 (Europe)	Broadsword Interactive	Mastertronic Group
EyeToy Play: Astro Zoo	November 2, 2007 (Europe)	London Studio	Sony Computer Entertainment Europe
EyeToy Play: Hero	2008 (Europe)	London Studio	Sony Computer Entertainment Europe
EyeToy Play: PomPom Party	2008 (Europe)	London Studio	Sony Computer Entertainment Europe

=== Works with EyeToy ===
These games may be used with the EyeToy optionally. They typically have an "Enhanced with EyeToy" or "EyeToy Enhanced" label on the box.

- AFL Premiership 2005 (IR Gurus, 2005)
- AFL Premiership 2006 (IR Gurus, 2006)
- AFL Premiership 2007 (IR Gurus, 2007)
- AND 1 Streetball
- Buzz! The Music Quiz (Sony, late 2005)
- Burnout Paradise (Criterion, 2008) - When you start the game for the first time on the PS3, it can use the Eyetoy to take a picture to be used on the License card.
- Buzz! The Big Quiz (Sony, March 2006)
- CMT Presents: Karaoke Revolution Country
- Dance Dance Revolution Extreme (North America) (Konami, 2004) – EyeToy mini games, players can optionally see themselves dancing, additional mode with 2 camera targets.
- DDR Festival Dance Dance Revolution (Konami, 2004) – EyeToy mini games, players can optionally see themselves dancing, additional mode with 2 camera targets.
- Dancing Stage Fusion (Konami, 2004) – EyeToy mini games, players can optionally see themselves dancing, additional mode with 2 camera targets.
- Dance Dance Revolution Extreme 2 (Konami, 2005) – EyeToy mini games, players can optionally see themselves dancing, additional mode with 2 camera targets.
- Dancing Stage Max (Konami, 2005) – EyeToy mini games, players can optionally see themselves dancing, additional mode with 2 camera targets.
- Dance Dance Revolution Strike (Konami, 2006) – EyeToy mini games, players can optionally see themselves dancing, additional mode with 2 camera targets.
- Dance Dance Revolution SuperNova (North America) (Konami, 2006) – EyeToy mini games, players can optionally see themselves dancing, additional mode with 2 camera targets.
- Dance Dance Revolution SuperNova (Konami, 2007) – EyeToy mini games, players can optionally see themselves dancing, additional mode with 2 camera targets.
- Dancing Stage SuperNova (Europe) (Konami, 2007) – EyeToy mini games, players can optionally see themselves dancing, additional mode with 2 camera targets.
- Dance Dance Revolution SuperNova 2 (North America) (Konami, 2007) – EyeToy mini games, players can optionally see themselves dancing, additional mode with 2 camera targets.
- Dance Dance Revolution SuperNova 2 (Konami, 2008) – EyeToy mini games, players can optionally see themselves dancing, additional mode with 2 camera targets.
- Dance Dance Revolution X (North America) (Konami, 2008) – EyeToy mini games, players can optionally see themselves dancing, additional mode with 2 camera targets.
- Dance Dance Revolution X2 (North America) (Konami, 2009) – EyeToy mini games, players can optionally see themselves dancing, additional mode with 2 camera targets.
- Dance Factory – players can optionally see themselves dancing, additional mode with 2 camera targets.
- DT Racer (XS Games, 2005) – Take a photo using the EyeToy camera and use as driver licence photo in-game and during races in first-person view you can see your reflection in the rear-view mirror.
- Formula One 05 (Sony, mid-2004)
- Flow: Urban Dance Uprising
- Gaelic Games: Football
- Get on da Mic (Eidos Interactive, 2004) – players can see their performance
- Gran Turismo 4 - used to unlock the Nike One concept car, intended for buyers of a Nike limited edition of the game
- Gretzky NHL 2005
- Harry Potter and the Prisoner of Azkaban (Electronic Arts, 2004) – features EyeToy minigames
- Jackie Chan Adventures (Sony, 2004) – features Eye Toy minigames
- Karaoke Revolution Party
- Karaoke Revolution Presents: American Idol
- Lemmings (Team17, 2006)
- L'eredità (Milestone srl, 2003) – used for player avatars
- LittleBigPlanet (Media Molecule, 2008) – Although released on the PS3 and designed for PlayStation Eye, it is EyeToy compatible. Players can take pictures to be used as in-game stickers for placement on walls and other surfaces
- LMA Manager 2005 (Codemasters, 2004) – players can have their pictures on in-game newspapers
- MLB 2005
- MLB 2006 – used to create a player
- MLB '06: The Show
- MLB '07: The Show
- MLB '08: The Show
- MLB '09: The Show
- MLB 10: The Show
- MLB 11: The Show
- NBA 07
- Racing Battle: C1 Grand Prix (Genki, 2005) – Used to capture textures to be used as car stickers in the bodypaint interface
- SingStar series (Sony, 2004–2008) – singers can optionally see themselves when singing
- The Sims 2 – players can take pictures of themselves, then put it on the wall or make their Sims paint it
- Stuart Little 3: Big Photo Adventure
- The Polar Express (THQ, 2004)
- The Sims 2: Pets
- The Urbz: Sims in the City (Electronic Arts, 2004) – players can have their faces on in-game billboards
- This Is Football 2005
- Tony Hawk's American Wasteland (Activision) – Used to import the player's face onto a created skater.
- Tony Hawk's Underground 2 (Activision, 2004) – Player can capture an image of their face and map it onto their character.
- YetiSports Arctic Adventures (JoWood Productions, 2005) – EyeToy multi-player games
- Who Wants To Be A Millionaire? Party Edition (Eidos Interactive, late 2006) – players can have their 'mugshots' on a winning check
- World Tour Soccer 2006

== Cameo ==
EyeToy: Cameo is a system for allowing players to include their own images as avatars in other games. Games that support the feature include a head scanning program that can be used to generate a 3D model of the player's head. Once stored on a memory card, this file is then available in games that support the Cameo feature. EyeToy: Cameo licenses the head creation technology Digimask.

== See also ==
- List of games compatible with EyeToy
- Mixed reality
- Dreameye, the first camera accessory for a home gaming console, used on the Dreamcast
- PlayStation Eye, the successor to the EyeToy for the PlayStation 3
- Xbox Live Vision, a similar camera made for the Xbox 360
- Kinect, a similar device made for the Xbox 360
