= Veris =

Veris may refer to:

- Veris Ltd, surveying firm in Australia
- Primula veris, flowering plant
- Veris printer, inkjet printer
- Lacus Veris, lunar mare
- FC Veris, Moldovan football club
- Boletus rex-veris, basidiomycete fungus
- Věříš si?, Czech television game show

== People ==
- Garin Veris (born 1963), American football player
- Kyle Veris (born 1983), American soccer player
