= Gold's Gym: Cardio Workout =

2008 video game

- North American cover art
- Developer: Rocket Company (Subsidiary of Imagineer)
- Publisher: Ubisoft: JP: Rocket Company
- Series: Gold's Gym; JP Shape Boxing; EU My Coach
- Platform: Wii
- Release: JP: October 30, 2008; NA: March 31, 2009; EU: July 17, 2009; AU: August 27, 2009
- Genre: Fitness game
- Mode: Single-player

Gold's Gym: Cardio Workout is an exercise video game for Nintendo's Wii video game console, developed by Japanese video game developer Rocket Company and released in the late 2000s worldwide.

== Overview ==
Cardio Workout is based on the "shape boxing" fitness regimen used at Kyoei Boxing Gym which includes shadowboxing, press-ups, and sit-ups. It also features a diet management feature.

== Development and release ==
Originally announced in mid-2007 as Wii Exercise with a release target of later that year, in May 2008, the game was stated to still be in an early stage of development. Though not originally intended to feature support for the Wii Balance Board, the feature was announced later. Shape Boxing was released in Japan on October 30, 2008 under the title Shape Boxing: Wii de Enjoy! Diet (シェイプボクシング Wiiでエンジョイダイエット！). The game was licensed by Ubisoft for other regional markets, and released in Europe as part of the publisher's My Coach series as My Fitness Coach: Cardio Workout, and released in North America and Australia as Gold's Gym: Cardio Workout, in partnership with the Gold's Gym fitness center chain.

== Sequels and successor ==
Rocket Company released two sequels to the Japanese game, Shape Boxing 2: Wii de Enjoy! Diet (シェイプボクシング2 Wiiでエンジョイダイエット！) in 2010 and Billy's Bootcamp: Wii de Enjoy! Diet (ビリーズブートキャンプ Wiiでエンジョイダイエット！) in 2011 in Japan, neither of which were localized.

Another Gold's Gym tie-in game was also released in 2010, developed by Japanese studio LandHo!, and published by Ubisoft released in North America as Gold's Gym: Dance Workout and My Fitness Coach: Dance Workout in PAL regions.

In 2016, Rocket Company was merged into its parent company, Imagineer. Imagineer developed and released a spiritual successor, Fitness Boxing, for the Nintendo Switch in 2018.

== See also ==
- EyeToy: Kinetic
- Wii Fit
- My Coach
- Yourself!Fitness
