= OTOC =

OTOC may refer to:

- Out-of-time-ordered correlator (OTOC), a mathematical operation in physics
- Ordem dos Técnicos Oficiais de Contas, an outdated term in accounting in Portugal
- Veris Ltd, is a spatial data services company, previously indexed under stock symbol OTOC
