= Operation Spy =

Operation Spy may refer to:

- Operation Spy, an interactive exhibition at the International Spy Museum
- EyeToy: Operation Spy, a video game for PlayStation 2
