= My French Coach and My Spanish Coach =

2007 video game

My French Coach My Spanish Coach
- Box art of the North American releases of My French Coach (top) and My Spanish Coach (bottom)
- Developer: Sensory Sweep Studios
- Publisher: Ubisoft
- Platforms: Nintendo DS, Wii, PlayStation Portable, iOS
- Release: Nintendo DS: NA: November 6, 2007; PAL: November 23, 2007; Wii: PAL: November 30, 2007; PlayStation Portable (My Spanish Coach): NA: October 7, 2008; EU: October 2008; iOS; June 6, 2009
- Genres: Educational, puzzle
- Mode: Single-player

My French Coach and My Spanish Coach are educational games developed by Sensory Sweep Studios and published by Ubisoft for the Nintendo DS, iOS, PlayStation Portable, and Wii. They are part of Ubisoft's My Coach series, and were released for the Nintendo DS on November 6, 2007 in North America, for the Wii on November 23, 2007 in Europe, and My Spanish Coach was released for the PlayStation Portable on October 7, 2008, and iOS on June 6, 2009. For their releases in Europe and Australia, the games were renamed My French Coach Level 1: Beginners and My Spanish Coach Level 1: Beginners.

French and Spanish language teachers assisted with the development of the gameplay for both games, which concentrates on teaching French or Spanish using lessons and minigames. As the player progresses through the lessons, the gameplay uses increasingly complex words and phrases. The games received praise and criticism from various video game publications; they praised the games' effectiveness in teaching the language, but lamented their repetitive nature. The next installments in the series, titled My French Coach Level 2: Intermediate and My Spanish Coach Level 2: Intermediate, also developed and published by Ubisoft, were released in Europe on November 23, 2007, alongside their Level 1 counterparts.

== Gameplay ==
The player going through the vocabulary given during the 44th lesson in My Spanish Coach; the player can listen to the pronunciation of the words in this sequence.

The gameplay of My French Coach and My Spanish Coach consists of the player completing lessons that introduce new vocabulary and then focus on mastering the words through several puzzles. As the player progresses through the game, the words increase in difficulty. When first starting the game, the player takes an introductory test that gauges their initial comprehension level of the French or Spanish language. The player is then placed into a level reflective of the score they received on the test. A player who scores highly will be able to skip many of the initial levels and more basic concepts. When starting a lesson, the player is shown ten new words, which include nouns, verbs, adjectives, or adverbs, as well as their meanings and proper enunciation.

Following this, the player is offered a choice of eight minigames to test their knowledge of the words given in the lesson. These minigames are Multiple Choice, Hit-A-Word, Word Find, Flash Cards, Fill in the Blank, Memory, Bridge Builder, and Spelltastic. In Multiple Choice, the player must select the correct French or Spanish translation of an English word from four choices in a limited time frame. Hit-A-Word is a Whac-A-Mole game in which the player must hit the most moles with the correct translation of an English word within the allotted time. Word Find is a word search in which the player must find the French or Spanish translations of a set of English words or phrases. In Flash Cards, the player is given a French or Spanish word and must choose the card with the proper English translation. In Memory, the player must select from a set of face-down cards a French or Spanish word and its English translation. Bridge Builder tests sentence structure; the player has to construct a proper sentence from a set of given words. In Spelltastic, the player listens to a French or Spanish word and spells it using a keyboard within the allotted time. For Fill-in-the-Blank, the player selects the proper conjugation of a French or Spanish verb within a sentence.

Whenever a player correctly answers a question or solves a puzzle in a minigame, they gain "mastery points" on the word they successfully answered. The minigames can be increased in difficulty; on higher difficulty levels, players will acquire more mastery points when successfully completing a minigame. For instance, in Multiple Choice, the player has 50 seconds to select an answer for a question on the "Easy" difficulty, and will receive two mastery points for each correct answer. On the "Medium" difficulty, the player has 40 seconds to select an answer and receives three mastery points for each correct answer. The process continues until the player scores fifteen mastery points for every word, allowing the player to proceed to the next lesson. Following the completion of all fifty lessons, the player can continue to learn new words through "open lessons" that contain ten new vocabulary words apiece; the dictionaries of both games each hold nearly 10,000 words. The player can freely access the reference section, which contains a dictionary and phrasebook, at any time. Both the dictionary and phrasebook hold all of the words and phrases in each game, as well as meanings and audio files for both; the player can look through different categories of words and phrases, use a search function, and bookmark chosen phrases.

== Development ==
My French Coach and My Spanish Coach are two of the first three games Ubisoft released for the My Coach series; the other game is My Word Coach. During the course of their development by Sensory Sweep Studios, the lessons and minigames were created with the help of French and Spanish language teachers. Ubisoft announced the creation of a new division to create the My Coach series on May 21, 2007, and that Pauline Jacquey, the producer of the Tom Clancy's Ghost Recon and Rayman series, would lead the division. When commenting on the direction of the My Coach series, Jacquey said that she was "developing projects that make people feel that playing games is worth their while, allowing them to spend quality time with family and friends, learn a new skill, or improve their daily lives". Ubisoft CEO Yves Guillemot commented that, "The timing is right for us to leverage our creativity and to open up the video games market to new consumers who will be attracted by content that can help them learn, grow and feel better in an entertaining way". All three games were released on November 6, 2007 in North America. Ubisoft followed with a PlayStation Portable version of My Spanish Coach, releasing it in North America on October 7, 2008; Wii versions of My French Coach and My Spanish Coach were released in Europe on November 30, 2007. The European releases for My French Coach, titled My French Coach Level 1: Beginners, and My Spanish Coach, renamed My Spanish Coach Level 1: Beginners, were accompanied by My French Coach Level 2: Intermediate and My Spanish Coach Level 2: Intermediate, the next games in the series.

== Reception ==
Reception

Aggregate scores
Aggregator	Score	
Aggregator	DS	PSP
GameRankings	80.00% (MFC); 75.29% (MSC)	60.00% (MSC)
Metacritic	73 of 100 (MSC)	N/A

Review scores
Publication	Score	
Publication	DS	PSP
Eurogamer	7.0 of 10^{[n 1]}	N/A
GameZone	7.0 of 10^{[n 1]}	N/A
IGN	7.0 of 10^{[n 1]}	7.0 of 10 (MSC)
Nintendo World Report	9.5 of 10 (MFC); 7 of 10 (MSC)	N/A

My French Coach and My Spanish Coach have received generally favorable reviews from several video game publications. On Metacritic, a website that compiles scores from various video game reviews, My Spanish Coach received a 73/100, based on seven reviews. In a review of the DS versions of both games, IGN called them a "great learning experience" and a more entertaining alternative to traditional methods of learning French and Spanish such as "[h]ours of boring exercises and outdated videos". Eurogamer claimed the games were not substitutes for proper language lessons, but admitted that "as tools for improving your language skills, whether you're starting from scratch or have some basic knowledge, they're great". In a review of the DS version of My French Coach, Nintendo World Report called the game "not be the hottest game to ever sit in your DS, but it is an unusually polished product that achieves the edutainment holy grail – it makes learning easy and fun". During the 2007 Christmas holiday season, video game retailer GameStop recommended My Spanish Coach for "The Academic Gamer". My Spanish Coach led all Nintendo DS games in sales during the week of August 15, 2008 to August 21, 2008.

The gameplay received mixed reviews from critics. In a review of the PSP version of My Spanish Coach, IGN noted that acquiring mastery points in the minigames leads to "quite a bit of grinding" due to the game's repetitive structure. Nevertheless, IGN accepted that the repetition was an effective way to learn the vocabulary, and noted that "[p]icking up on things like gender and age, emphasis and the breakdowns of the actual language itself and proper/casual ways of conversing are made fairly clear and reinforced regularly". IGN's review of the DS versions of both games commented that neither game taught the future or past tense, calling it one of the "most disappointing" aspects of the game, but praised the effective incorporation of the DS stylus into the minigames. Eurogamer noted that the minigames were "only really good for practicing reading" due to a lack of games for practicing proper speaking, but GameZone disagreed, noting that the player was able to hear their attempt to speak the French or Spanish words alongside the correct pronunciation during lessons, and praised this aspect as the "most interesting and intriguing feature of [My French Coach and My Spanish Coach]". In a review of the DS version of My Spanish Coach, Nintendo World Report lamented that many of the minigames "exhibit the same type of unimaginative boringness" and that "it takes ages to unlock new lessons and mini-games"; however, it noted that the minigames were "extremely effective" and "constructed extremely well" in terms of teaching the language. Nintendo World Report's review of the DS version of My French Coach called the game's reference section "a very handy travel dictionary", noting that having a dictionary list and a phrasebook with audio files that could bookmark chosen phrases was "an absurd value".

The games' graphics and audio also received praise and criticism from reviewers. IGN's review of the PSP version of My Spanish Coach noted that the fact that the game appeared on multiple platforms contributed to its "sparse look and feel" because the games' graphics and audio were made for the Nintendo DS. Eurogamer praised the games' "clean, crisp visuals" and "jolly accordion music and jolly fiesta music". In contrast, IGN's review of the DS versions of both games called the music "catchy but repetitive" and the graphics "cute but nothing to write home about". GameZone noted that "[t]he visual concept was obviously not a front runner in [the games'] conception", and that the audio of neither game "[does] anything remotely special". Nintendo World Report made note of the games' narrator during the lessons, praising its "clear and coherent glory" in terms of pronouncing the words correctly.

== See also ==
- List of Ubisoft games
