= Tiger Woods PGA Tour 2005 =

2004 video game

- Developers: EA Redwood Shores; Headgate Studios (PC, Mac); Sensory Sweep Studios (DS); Team Fusion (PSP)
- Publisher: EA Sports
- Composer: BT
- Series: PGA Tour
- Platforms: GameCube, Microsoft Windows, Xbox, PlayStation 2, Nintendo DS, PlayStation Portable, Mac OS X
- Release: GameCube, PlayStation 2, Windows, Xbox: AU: September 17, 2004 (PS2, GC, Xbox); NA: September 21, 2004; EU: September 24, 2004; Nintendo DS: NA: December 14, 2004; EU: March 11, 2005; AU: March 2005; PlayStation Portable: NA: March 24, 2005; EU: October 7, 2005; Macintosh: NA: August 16, 2005
- Genre: Sports
- Modes: Single-player, multiplayer

The official EA Games Tiger Woods PGA Tour 2005 CD

Tiger Woods PGA Tour 2005 is a sports video game developed by EA Redwood Shores for the GameCube, Xbox and PlayStation 2 versions, Headgate Studios for the Microsoft Windows and Mac OS X versions, Sensory Sweep Studios for the Nintendo DS version and EA Canada's Team Fusion division for the PlayStation Portable version and published by EA Sports for GameCube, Microsoft Windows, Xbox, PlayStation 2, Nintendo DS, PlayStation Portable and Mac OS X. An N-Gage version was planned but never released. The game was the first in the series to feature Xbox Live Multiplayer, but only in North America. EA shut down the servers some time before August 1, 2007.

The DS and PSP versions were released as Tiger Woods PGA Tour, omitting the year from the title (likely as they were released later than the other versions). The full title was, however, printed on the DS version's cartridge.

== Reception ==
Reception

Aggregate score
Aggregator	Score					
Aggregator	DS	GameCube	PC	PS2	PSP	Xbox
Metacritic	64/100	88/100	91/100	88/100	78/100	88/100

Review scores
Publication	Score					
Publication	DS	GameCube	PC	PS2	PSP	Xbox
Electronic Gaming Monthly	N/A	8.67/10	N/A	8.67/10	7.5/10	8.67/10
Eurogamer	6/10	N/A	N/A	8/10	N/A	N/A
Famitsu	26/40	N/A	N/A	N/A	N/A	N/A
Game Informer	4/10	8.5/10	N/A	8.5/10	8/10	8.5/10
GamePro	N/A	N/A	N/A	4.5/5	N/A	4.5/5
GameRevolution	N/A	B+	N/A	B+	N/A	B+
GameSpot	7.3/10	8.4/10	8.9/10	8.4/10	8.2/10	8.4/10
GameSpy	N/A	4.5/5	5/5	5/5	4/5	5/5
GameZone	6.8/10	9.2/10	9/10	8.5/10	8.5/10	8.7/10
IGN	6/10	9/10	9/10	9/10	7.6/10	9/10
Nintendo Power	4/5	4.2/5	N/A	N/A	N/A	N/A
Official U.S. PlayStation Magazine	N/A	N/A	N/A	4.5/5	4/5	N/A
Official Xbox Magazine (US)	N/A	N/A	N/A	N/A	N/A	9.3/10
PC Gamer (US)	N/A	N/A	90%	N/A	N/A	N/A
The Sydney Morning Herald	N/A	N/A	N/A	N/A	N/A	4/5
The Times	N/A	N/A	5/5	5/5	N/A	5/5

Tiger Woods PGA Tour 2005 received "generally favorable" reviews on all platforms except the PC version, which received "universal acclaim" and the DS version, which received "mixed or average" reviews, according to video game review aggregator Metacritic.

During the 8th Annual Interactive Achievement Awards, the Academy of Interactive Arts & Sciences awarded PGA Tour 2005 with "Computer Sports Game of the Year".
