= My Chinese Coach =

2008 video game

- Developer: Sensory Sweep Studios
- Publisher: Ubisoft
- Platforms: Nintendo DS, iOS
- Release: Nintendo DS: NA: August 26, 2008; iOS; June 6, 2009
- Genre: Educational game

My Chinese Coach is a video game for the Nintendo DS and iOS developed by Sensory Sweep Studios and published by Ubisoft. As an installment of the My Coach series, the game teaches Mandarin Chinese through a series of lessons and games. It was released August 26, 2008.

== Gameplay ==
According to Ubisoft, My Chinese Coach will develop a player's Chinese knowledge by lessons which teach the player the correct ways to pronounce words in Mandarin Chinese by comparing themselves to native speakers using the Nintendo DS's, iPhone's, or iPod Touch's microphone, as well as using the touch screen or stylus to allow players to trace and correctly write simplified Chinese characters.
