= Yourself!Fitness =

2004 video game

- Developer(s): Respondesign; Ubisoft (Wii)
- Publisher(s): Respondesign; Ubisoft (Wii)
- Engine: RenderWare
- Platform(s): Xbox, Microsoft Windows, PlayStation 2, Wii
- Release: Xbox: NA: October 8, 2004; Windows: NA: December 18, 2004; PlayStation 2: NA: February 2, 2005; Wii: NA: December 2, 2008; EU: January 23, 2009; AU: February 12, 2009
- Genre(s): Exergaming
- Mode(s): Single-player

Yourself!Fitness is an exercise video game, developed by Respondesign. It was published first for the Xbox, and later for PlayStation 2 and Microsoft Windows. Through a publishing deal with Ubisoft, Yourself!Fitness was ported to and released on the Wii in December 2008 under the name My Fitness Coach.

== Gameplay ==
Players are led by a virtual personal fitness coach named Maya (voiced by Yumi Lee, who is also credited for workout design and modeling). Prior to the first workout, players must complete a fitness assessment. Players are asked to record their resting heart rates, then, following two minutes of jumping jacks, are asked to record their heart rates again. This data is used to approximate the relative intensity of the physical activity of completing that set of jumping jacks. This is then used to determine what types of exercises Maya will ask players to complete during their exercise routines. The fitness assessment also records players' self-reported weight and evaluates strength and flexibility.

Core strength is measured by the amount of sit-ups (a maximum of 40) the player can complete; lower-body strength is measured by the number of squats (a maximum of 60) the player can complete, and upper strength is measured by the number of push-ups (a maximum of 40) the player can complete. Flexibility is measured on a 1-7 scale by how far the player can reach forward when seated with the legs stretched out in front with feet flexed. On every 10th workout, the player will repeat this fitness evaluation as a Physical Challenge. This results in a dynamic workout program that changes with the player's physical fitness level and ability. Based on the results of each Physical Challenge, Maya will suggest one of 5 areas a player can choose to emphasize in—Weight Loss, Cardio, Upper Strength, Core Strength, and Lower Strength. In addition to this, Maya will also suggest an emphasis for each workout a player initiates. In addition to these workout options, the player can choose to do Yoga by selecting the Meditation Garden.

Once a workout is selected, players can choose the duration of their workouts from 15, 30, 45, or 60 minutes. The duration is a rough estimate, with the workouts often being a few minutes longer due to additional time spent warming up and stretching. Players can then choose a virtual environment to work out in as well as what genre of background music to listen to. Only a few environments and music genres are available at first, but more are unlocked through regular play.

The game includes over 500 types of exercises, although some exercises with variable repetitions are counted as separate in this tally. Furthermore, if the player owns an exercise ball, hand weights, an exercise step, or a heart rate monitor, Maya can incorporate these into the program. At certain sections of the routine, Maya will stop to ask how the player is doing; the player's selection of one of three replies will affect whether the program strengthens, weakens, or leaves the current regimen as it is.

== Development ==
In a 2006 fitness promotional campaign with the popular fast-food chain McDonald's, purchasers of an "Active Meal" (consisting of a salad and bottled water) could receive one of four Yourself!Fitness DVDs, playable in a standard DVD player, which contains a rigid workout regimen also led by Maya. Each disc is dedicated to a certain theme—Yoga, cardio, strength training, or "core" training—and contains workouts that are 15 minutes in length.

== Reception ==
Reception

Aggregate scores
Aggregator	Score			
Aggregator	PC	PS2	Wii	Xbox
GameRankings	77%	73%	71%	84%
Metacritic	N/A	71/100	71/100	80/100

Review scores
Publication	Score			
Publication	PC	PS2	Wii	Xbox
GameZone	7.8/10	8.2/10	N/A	N/A
IGN	N/A	6.6/10	7.2/10	8.2/10
Official Xbox Magazine (US)	N/A	N/A	N/A	8.5/10
PlayStation: The Official Magazine	N/A	8/10	N/A	N/A
CiN Weekly	77/100	77/100	N/A	77/100
Detroit Free Press	N/A	N/A	N/A	2/4 stars

The Xbox version received "favorable" reviews, while the PlayStation 2 and Wii versions received "average" reviews, according to the review aggregation website Metacritic.

In January 2006, CiN Weekly gave the game a score of 77 out of 100 and said that, "Though a little cheesy, it's a good way to create a customized home workout with menu suggestions and progress chart." Detroit Free Press, however, gave the Xbox version two stars out of four and stated, "It's a shame that the disc, which offers 4,500 recipes and meal plans also printable at the program's Web site, is so inflexible about allowing other workouts into its tracking system, and that what should be the central focus, the workouts themselves, is so lackluster."

== See also ==
- EyeToy: Kinetic
- Wii Fit
- My Coach
- Gold's Gym: Cardio Workout
