= My Japanese Coach =

2008 video game

- North American cover art for My Japanese Coach
- Developer: Sensory Sweep Studios
- Publisher: Ubisoft
- Platforms: Nintendo DS, iOS
- Release: Nintendo DS: NA: October 14, 2008; AU: October 30, 2008; EU: November 7, 2008; iOS; June 6, 2009
- Genre: Educational game
- Mode: Single-player

My Japanese Coach is a video game for the Nintendo DS and iOS developed by American company Sensory Sweep Studios and published by Ubisoft. As an installment of the My Coach series, the game teaches Japanese through a series of lessons and games. It was released on October 14, 2008.

== Gameplay ==
According to Ubisoft, My Japanese Coach (MJC) will develop a player's Japanese knowledge by lessons which teach the player the correct ways to pronounce words in Japanese. Players can compare their pronunciation to that of native speakers using the Nintendo DS's microphone, as well as using the touch screen and stylus to allow players to trace and correctly practice writing Japanese characters.

A digital character in the game, called Haruka, acts as your teacher for learning Japanese. There are various stages that you work your way through after having taken a small multiple choice, placement like test to see if you knew any Japanese prior to starting the game. If you miss two questions in a row on the placement test, the test ends.

There are also several games you can play to help you learn and win the mastery points that are needed to clear levels; once you master all the words given in one level, you'll be able to move on. Games include flash cards, multiple choice, hit-a-word, fading characters, write cards, memory, word search, etc.

== Reception ==
The reception for the DS version of My Japanese Coach has been mixed to positive, it holds a 59 on Metascore.

IGN gave the game a 5.5 out of 10, describing the game as having a "Difficulty curve (that) gets very steep and explanations come hard and fast."

== References and notes ==
http://ds.ign.com/objects/142/14270524.html
