= EyeToy: Groove =

2003 video game

- European cover
- Developer: London Studio
- Publisher: Sony Computer Entertainment
- Series: EyeToy
- Platform: PlayStation 2
- Release: EU: November 14, 2003; NA: April 20, 2004; JP: June 24, 2004
- Genre: Rhythm
- Modes: Single-player, multiplayer

EyeToy: Groove is a rhythm video game developed by London Studio and published by Sony Computer Entertainment for the PlayStation 2. It was released on November 14, 2003 in Europe, on April 20, 2004 in North America, and on June 24, 2004 in Japan as EyeToy: FuriFuri Dance Tengoku. In EyeToy: Groove the player must hit targets with their arms on the edges of the screen to the beat of the music.

The game also includes a built-in calorie counter which estimates calories burned based on the player's weight. Players can usually burn around 5-20 calories per song. There are rewards available for high amounts of calories burned. There is also a mode that allows players to design their own moves for the songs.

== Gameplay ==
Building on from the 'Beat Freak' mode from EyeToy: Play, players must hit targets on the edges of the screen with their arms in time to the music. There will sometimes be stars that require players to follow it from one position to the other. There are also freestyle segments in which players earn points by freely moving about on screen.

== Music ==
There are 28 songs from several different artists including The Cheeky Girls, Daniel Bedingfield, Mis-Teeq, Earth, Wind & Fire, 5ive, Elvis Presley, Fatboy Slim, Groove Armada, Good Charlotte, Jessica Simpson, Sugababes, Las Ketchup, Madonna, and Village People.

== Reception ==
Reception

Aggregate score
Aggregator	Score
Metacritic	73/100

Review scores
Publication	Score
Edge	7/10
Electronic Gaming Monthly	7.67/10
Eurogamer	6/10
Famitsu	24/40
Game Informer	6/10
GamePro	4/5
GameSpot	7.3/10
GameSpy	3/5
GameZone	8.5/10
IGN	7.5/10
Official U.S. PlayStation Magazine	4.5/5
Entertainment Weekly	A−

The game received "average" reviews according to the review aggregation website Metacritic. In Japan, Famitsu gave it a score of one seven, one five, and two sixes for a total of 24 out of 40.

== See also ==
- Dance pad
