= Jackass: The Game =

2007 video game

- Developers: Sidhe (PlayStation 2, PlayStation Portable); Sensory Sweep Studios (Nintendo DS)
- Publisher: Red Mile Entertainment
- Platforms: PlayStation 2; Nintendo DS; PlayStation Portable
- Release: PlayStation 2: NA: September 24, 2007; EU: November 23, 2007; AU: December 24, 2007; PlayStation Portable: NA: September 27, 2007; EU: November 23, 2007; AU: April 3, 2008; Nintendo DS: NA: January 8, 2008; EU: June 1, 2008; AU: September 19, 2008
- Genre: Party
- Modes: Single-player, multiplayer

Jackass: The Game is a 2007 party video game based on the MTV reality stunt show of the same name. It was developed by Sidhe for the PlayStation 2 and PlayStation Portable, while the Nintendo DS version was developed by Sensory Sweep Studios. The game was published by Red Mile Entertainment.

== Plot ==
After Jeff Tremaine accidentally "injures his vagina" and is hospitalized, the crew calls upon the player to step up and fill the role as director of Jackass. The player's goal is to collect the best footage from up to 36 different stunts throughout the game to create an all-new season of Jackass for MTV. All stunts have a minimum requirement for content before MTV will approve an episode for broadcast. These requirements are broken up into specific objectives for each stunt. The new season requires seven episodes of Jackass footage.

== Gameplay ==
It was stated that the video game would consist of a set of 40 minigames that closely follow aspects of both the series and the movies. Wee Man has his own set of minigames in the video game. It is stated on the official game website that the DS version has an open environment with which players interact to pull off stunts.

Jackass: The Game offers two gameplay modes:

- MTV Story Mode: The primary campaign mode for Jackass: The Game. By playing through this mode, the player can unlock new content within the game, such as new characters and outfits.
- Episodes: Stunts are collected into groups called "Episodes". Episodes in the game are similar to the format and structure of the TV series, collecting a series of five stunts which may or may not be related by a general theme. In each episode, the player is free to complete the stunts in any order.

The game contains two bonus features:

- Director Mode: This mode gives players the ability to use their saved replays from various stunts and edit the footage as they see fit. Players are given a variety of different camera angles to edit each replay how they'd like. This feature is only available in the PSP version.
- Theater: This feature contains actual stunts from the Jackass TV series for players to view. Theater mode includes stunts such as "The Vomelet", "Party Boy", and "The Cup Test". This feature also includes a special behind-the-scenes look at the Jackass cast recording their individual voice-overs for the game.

== Development ==
All of the Jackass cast (excluding Bam Margera, who could not appear in the game due to contractual commitments with Activision) and crew provided their own voices and supplied their likenesses for the game. The game uses motion capture to replicate the cast's movements: Ryan Dunn did not participate in motion capture due to medical complications and recovery following a blood clot during the filming of Jackass Number Two, which also coincided with a period of depression; he does, however, voice his in-game character. Johnny Knoxville and other members of the Jackass team also provided stunt ideas to the developers based on unused stunts from the show. Steve-O retrospectively speculated that the sparseness of his voice lines in the game was likely due to his drug use at the time making him unsuitable to record.

== Reception ==
Reception

Aggregate score
| Aggregator | Score | | |
| Aggregator | DS | PS2 | PSP |
|---|---|---|---|
| Metacritic | 35/100 | 58/100 | 58/100 |

Review scores
| Publication | Score | | |
| Publication | DS | PS2 | PSP |
|---|---|---|---|
| 1Up.com | N/A | D+ | C |
| Eurogamer | N/A | 5/10 | N/A |
| Game Informer | N/A | N/A | 6.25/10 |
| GamePro | N/A | N/A | 2/5 |
| GameSpot | N/A | 6.5/10 | 6.5/10 |
| GameZone | N/A | 7.2/10 | 7/10 |
| IGN | 4/10 | 6/10 | 6.8/10 |
| PALGN | N/A | N/A | 6/10 |
| PlayStation: The Official Magazine | N/A | 6/10 | 6.5/10 |
| X-Play | N/A | 2/5 | N/A |

The PlayStation 2 and PSP versions received "mixed" reviews, while the DS version received "unfavorable" reviews, according to the review aggregation website Metacritic.

Jackass: The Game for PSP was awarded the IGN PlayStation Portable Readers Game of the Month for September 2007.

The PSP version also won the award in the User Generated Content category at the TUANZ Business Internet 2007 Awards in November 2007 on the strength of its video capture, editing, and sharing tools.
