= Digimask =

Digimask is an avatar technology that allows a user to input a front and (optional) side digital photo of their head which then automatically creates a fully articulated 3D model of that head. This 3D model can then be used in digital applications such as video games and mobile phones. Digimask technology is the core of the EyeToy: Cameo system for Sony's video game consoles.

In 2001, Digimask was nominated for a BAFTA for Technical Innovation.

At E3 2006 it was announced that Digimask face-mapping technology would be available using the Xbox Live Vision Camera and featured in the Xbox 360 titles World Series of Poker: Tournament of Champions and Tom Clancy's Rainbow Six: Vegas.

== Games ==
The Digimask technology has appeared in the following games:

=== PlayStation 3 (PlayStation Eye) ===
- Tom Clancy's Rainbow Six: Vegas 2 - (2008), Ubisoft

=== Xbox 360 (Xbox Live Vision) ===
- FaceBreaker - (2008), EA Sports
- Football Manager 2007 - (2006), Sega
- Pro Evolution Soccer 2008 - (2007), Konami
- Pro Evolution Soccer 2009 - (2008), Konami
- Tom Clancy's Rainbow Six: Vegas - (2006), Ubisoft
- Tom Clancy's Rainbow Six: Vegas 2 - (2008), Ubisoft
- World Series of Poker: Tournament of Champions - (2006), Left Field, Activision
- World Series of Poker 2008: Battle for the Bracelets - (2008), Left Field, Activision

=== PlayStation 2 (EyeToy Cameo) ===
EyeToy Cameo was developed jointly by SCEE and Digimask.

- AFL Premiership 2006 (aka Gaelic Games: Football) - IR Gurus, SCEE
- EyeToy: Play 2 - (2004), SCEE
- F1 Career Challenge - (2003), EA
- Formula One 05 - (2005), SCEE
- Karaoke Revolution Country - (2006), Harmonix Music, Konami
- Karaoke Revolution Party - (2005), Harmonix Music, Konami
- Karaoke Revolution Presents: American Idol - (2007), Blitz Games, Konami
- MLB 07 The Show
- This is Football 2005 (aka World Tour Soccer 2006) - SCEE
- World Rally Championship 3 (2003), Evolution, SCEE
