= Billy's Bootcamp =

Military inspired exercise program by Billy Blanks

Billy's Bootcamp is an exercise program developed by Billy Blanks. It created a pop culture phenomenon in Japan in 2007, similar to the effect Tae Bo had in the U.S. earlier, selling more than 200,000 copies in May of the same year alone.

Billy Blanks visited Japan on June 21, 2007 to promote Bootcamp. Upon arrival Blanks was greeted by 200 Japanese fans who affectionately call him "Taicho" (Japanese: 隊長, chief) at Narita International Airport. Blanks appeared on many Japanese TV shows during his ten-day stay in Japan such as SMAP×SMAP where Shingo Katori, a member of popular Japanese boy band SMAP, impersonated Blanks.

A tie-in video game based on the program, titled Billy's Bootcamp: Wii de Enjoy! Diet (ビリーズブートキャンプ Wiiでエンジョイダイエット！), was released in 2011 exclusively in Japan for the Wii, as the third and final installment of Rocket Company's Shape Boxing fitness game trilogy.
