= Věříš si? =

Czech television game show

- Two contestants and the host
- Presented by: Marta Ondráčková (2007); Kamila Dvorská (2008-2013); Ondřej Havlík (2008-2009); Jan Adámek (2012-2013)
- Country of origin: Czech Republic

Production
- Running time: 26 minutes

Original release
- Network: Czech Television
- Release: 8 January 2007 – 24 June 2013

Věříš si? (English: Do you believe in yourself?) was a Czech television game show for children from elementary schools (from grades 6 until 8) and Czech junior high schools (from prima grade to tercie grade).

== Rules ==
Every week four contestants compete in four challenges. At the beginning of the show, each contestant is given 100 starting points. Before most challenges each contestant is supposed to bet a certain number of points. If they reach the first place, they receive the bet number of points, if they reach the second place, they receive a half of the bet number of points. No points are received for the third place, and for the fourth place, the contestant loses all bet points. The winner of the show is the contestant with the highest number of received points.

== Challenges ==
=== Warm-up ===
This challenge is called Zahřívačka in Czech. Its purpose for contestants is to gain some extra points for upcoming challenges. Each contestant is asked three trivia questions, and receives 10 points for every correctly answered one.

=== Triathlon ===
This challenge consists of three sub-challenges. Contestants are supposed to finish them as fast as possible, the fastest one reaches the first place.

==== Triathlon sub-challenges ====
- Rowing: Contestants are supposed to row 200 meters using an indoor rower.
- Touch assignments: Contestants are supposed to do a certain assignment without using their eyesight. The assignments may vary in every episode, the most common ones are recognizing a letter, opening a chest with a key, and building a little Tower of Hanoi.
- A puzzle: Contestants are supposed to solve a puzzle. The puzzle is usually a jigsaw puzzle, a tangram, or Towers of Hanoi.

=== Trivia ===
Contestants are supposed to answer nine trivia questions in three randomly chosen categories.

=== Virtual game ===
Since the show was sponsored by Sony, the contestants compete in various video games from Sony's EyeToy series.

== Prizes ==
The winner of the show may either win a basic prize, or a special prize, depending on whether they succeed in a quick final assignment. The basic prize consists of various board games, card games, books, or little gadgets The special prize may vary in every episode, usually it's a portable media player or a Sony video game console. The other three contestants who don't win the show are given Věříš si? T-shirts along with small gadgets and card games.

== Guests ==
Exceptional children presenting their hobbies and/or activities (e.g. figure skating, horse riding etc.) are shown in a short clip within each show.
