= Nicktoons Movin' =

2004 video game

- Cover art of North American version
- Developer: Mass Media
- Publisher: THQ
- Series: SpongeBob SquarePants
- Platform: PlayStation 2
- Release: NA: October 22, 2004; EU: November 26, 2004
- Genres: Action, party
- Modes: Single-player, Multiplayer

Nicktoons Movin' (known as SpongeBob SquarePants: Movin' with friends in PAL regions) is a party video game developed by Mass Media and published by THQ released in 2004. It features characters from the shows SpongeBob SquarePants, Danny Phantom, Rocket Power, The Fairly OddParents, and The Adventures of Jimmy Neutron, Boy Genius. The game requires the EyeToy accessory to play.

== Gameplay ==
Similarly to other EyeToy minigame compilations, like EyeToy: Play and Sega Superstars, the gameplay consists of the player moving their upper-body in front of the EyeToy camera to manipulate objects and characters within the thirteen minigames. Before playing a minigame to achieve a high-score, SpongeBob SquarePants and Patrick Star commentate over the menu screens, and video clips from the animated episodes that the minigames are based on are shown. The multiplayer mode allows two to eight players to compete for points between one and thirteen rounds of minigames. After each minigame, the winner gets to pick the next game and the option to spin a wheel for additional points. While motion controls are required to play the minigames, some menus offer the option to use a DualShock 2 controller for navigation.

== Reception ==
IGN gave the game an "Okay" score of 6.0. Official PlayStation Magazine gave the game a 3 out of 5.
