= My SAT Coach =

2008 video game

- Developer: Ubisoft Montreal
- Publisher: Ubisoft
- Series: My Coach
- Platform: Nintendo DS
- Release: NA: September 23, 2008
- Genre: Edutainment
- Mode: Single-player

My SAT Coach is a game on the Nintendo DS that helps students prepare for the SAT, a common standardized college-entry exam for American high school students.

The Princeton Review partnered with Ubisoft to create the game. The game features several learning exercises that progress through three stages of learning. It contains Mini-Game Drills, Personal Follow-Up and The Real Expert. The game is intended to help students improve their SAT scores.

== Reception ==
IGN stated it was not too bad and that it is "simple and easy to follow;" reviewer Jack Devries's final opinion was that "If your school offers an SAT prep course, I would definitely recommend that over this title, but if you didn't plan on studying at all, then My SAT Coach is probably better than nothing." IGN gave it 6.5.
