= Sensory Sweep Studios =

American video game developer

- Company type: Private
- Industry: Video games
- Founded: 2003
- Defunct: 2009
- Headquarters: Salt Lake City, Utah, U.S.
- Key people: Dave Rushton (Founder, President)
- Products: See complete products listing
- Number of employees: 100+

Sensory Sweep Studios was an American video game developer based in Salt Lake City, Utah.

Founded in 2003 by Dave Rushton and ex-Saffire employees, Sensory Sweep was initially a handheld studio, developing games for the Game Boy Advance, Nintendo DS, and PSP. Later, Sensory Sweep added console titles to their résumé, releasing games for the PC, Wii, PlayStation 2, and Xbox 360.

Sensory Sweep released several from notable franchises, including Justice League Heroes, Marvel Nemesis: Rise of the Imperfects, Tiger Woods PGA Tour 2005, Foster's Home for Imaginary Friends: Imagination Invaders, Alvin and the Chipmunks, and Jackass: The Game. Additionally, Sensory Sweep's release of Street Fighter II: Hyper Fighting was, at the time of its release, the fastest selling Xbox Live Arcade.

== Legal issues ==
On January 14, 2009, Sensory Sweep and Dave Rushton, founder and president of Sensory Sweep were named as co-defendants in a wage claim lawsuit filed in Utah District Court by the United States Department of Labor. The filing claimed employees are owed over $2 million in wages in a violation against the Fair Labor Standards Act. The lawsuit was resolved in October 2012 when Rushton was jailed for 12 months and ordered to pay $1.2 million. It was the first criminal prosecution for non-payment of wages in Utah.

On December 15, 2010, Rushton pleaded guilty to one third-degree felony count of failing to pay taxes and one second-degree felony count of engaging in a pattern of unlawful activity. He was sentenced to six months in jail for tax fraud and racketeering, and ordered to pay $516,816 in restitution. He also received 72 months probation during which he is forbidden from handling money for other people.

== Games ==
- Sentient - cancelled (Xbox 360)
- Crash Tag Team Racing - cancelled (NDS)
- Dirty Harry - cancelled (NDS, PSP, PS2, Wii, Xbox, PC)
- Raphael - cancelled (PS3, Xbox 360)
- Eagle Summoner - cancelled (NDS, Wii)
- Oregon Files: The Video Game - cancelled (PS3, Xbox 360)
- Time Traveler - cancelled (PS2)
- Knock 'Em Downs: World's Fair - 2010 (NDS; published by Bayer HealthCare as part of the Didgit glucose meter system)
- Drama Queens - 2009 (NDS)
- The Tale of Despereaux - 2008 (PS2, Wii, PC)
- My Japanese Coach - 2008 (NDS)
- My Chinese Coach - 2008 (NDS)
- Major League Eating: The Game - 2008 (WiiWare)
- Jackass: The Game - 2008 (NDS)
- Alvin and the Chipmunks - 2007 (NDS, PS2, Wii, PC)
- My Spanish Coach - 2007 (NDS, PSP)
- My French Coach - 2007 (NDS)
- Foster's Home for Imaginary Friends: Imagination Invaders - 2007 (NDS)
- SnoCross 2: Featuring Blair Morgan - 2007 (PS2)
- Capcom Puzzle World - 2007 (PSP)
- Glucoboy - 2007 (GBA)
- Justice League Heroes - 2006 (NDS)
- Tom and Jerry Tales - 2006 (NDS, GBA)
- Capcom Classics Mini Mix - 2006 (GBA)
- Street Fighter II: Hyper Fighting - 2006 (Xbox 360)
- Hi Hi Puffy AmiYumi: The Genie and the Amp - 2006 (NDS)
- Monopoly/Boggle/Yahtzee/Battleship - 2005 (NDS)
- Need For Speed: Most Wanted - 2005 (NDS)
- Marvel Nemesis: Rise of the Imperfects - 2005 (NDS)
- World Championship Poker: Deluxe Series - 2005 (NDS)
- Tiger Woods PGA Tour 2005 - 2004 (NDS)
- Yu Yu Hakusho: Tournament Tactics - 2004 (GBA)
- Yu Yu Hakusho: Spirit Detective - 2003 (GBA)
