= 8th Annual Interactive Achievement Awards =

Video game awards

- Date: February 1, 2005
- Venue: Green Valley Ranch
- Country: Las Vegas, Nevada, USA
- Hosted by: Kurt Scholler and Cory Rouse

Highlights
- Most awards: Half-Life 2 (9)
- Most nominations: Half-Life 2 (11)
- Game of the Year: Half-Life 2
- Hall of Fame: Trip Hawkins

The 8th Annual Interactive Achievement Awards was the 8th edition of the Interactive Achievement Awards, an annual awards event that honored the best games in the video game industry during 2004. The awards were arranged by the Academy of Interactive Arts & Sciences (AIAS) and were held at the Green Valley Ranch Resort in Las Vegas, Nevada on February 1, 2005. It was also held as part of the Academy's 2005 D.I.C.E. Summit. It was hosted by Kurt Scholler and Cory Rouse, and featured presenters including Lorne Lanning, Tommy Tallarico, Ray Muzyka, Greg Zeschuk, Stan Lee, Sid Meier, Jack Tretton, and Doug Lowenstein.

The award for "Online Gameplay" had been reintroduced as a craft award instead of a genre award. This year's finalists were listed for "Wireless Game of the Year" along with the computer award for "Children's Game of the Year".

Half-Life 2 received the most nominations and won the most awards, including "Game of the Year". As a publisher, Vivendi Universal Games won the most awards, while Nintendo and Sony Computer Entertainment received the most nominations. Nintendo also tied with Electronic Arts for having the most nominated games while Nintendo had the most award-winning games. The Mario franchise had two award-winning titles with Paper Mario: The Thousand-Year Door for "Console Role-Playing Game of the Year" and Super Mario 64 DS for "Wireless Game of the Year". This would be the final year of separate genre awards for console and computer. Namco was the only developer with more than one award-winning game.

Trip Hawkins, founder of Electronic Arts, was inducted into the Academy of Interactive Arts & Sciences Hall of Fame.

== Winners and Nominees ==
Winners are listed first, highlighted in boldface, and indicated with a double dagger (‡).

**Game of the Year**: **Half-Life 2** — **Valve**, **Vivendi Universal Games**‡; Grand Theft Auto: San Andreas — Rockstar North; Halo 2 — Bungie, Microsoft Game Studios; Katamari Damacy — Namco; World of Warcraft — Blizzard Entertainment, Vivendi Universal Games
**Console Game of the Year**: **Halo 2** — **Bungie**, **Microsoft Game Studios**‡; Burnout 3: Takedown — Criterion Games, Electronic Arts; Grand Theft Auto: San Andreas — Rockstar North; Katamari Damacy — Namco; Ratchet & Clank: Up Your Arsenal — Insomniac Games, Sony Computer Entertainment	**Computer Game of the Year**: **Half-Life 2** — **Valve**, **Vivendi Universal Games**‡; City of Heroes — Cryptic Studios, NCSoft; Doom 3 — id Software, Activision; Sid Meier's Pirates! — Firaxis Games, Atari; World of Warcraft — Blizzard Entertainment, Vivendi Universal Games

=== Innovation Awards ===
**Outstanding Innovation in Computer Gaming**: **Half-Life 2** — **Valve**, **Vivendi Universal Games**‡; City of Heroes — Cryptic Studios, NCSoft; Doom 3 — id Software, Activision; Rome: Total War — Creative Assembly, Activision; The Sims 2 — Maxis, Electronic Arts	**Outstanding Innovation in Console Gaming**: **Katamari Damacy** — **Namco**‡; Donkey Konga — Namco, Nintendo; EyeToy: AntiGrav — Harmonix, Sony Computer Entertainment; Fable — Lionhead Studios, Microsoft Game Studios; Halo 2 — Bungie, Microsoft Game Studios

=== Craft Awards ===
**Outstanding Achievement in Game Design**: **Katamari Damacy** — **Namco**‡; City of Heroes — Cryptic Studios, NCSoft; Fable — Lionhead Studios, Microsoft Game Studios; Grand Theft Auto: San Andreas — Rockstar North; Half-Life 2 — Valve, Vivendi Universal Games	**Outstanding Achievement in Character or Story Development**: **Fable** — **Lionhead Studios**, **Microsoft Game Studios**‡; Forgotten Realms: Demon Stone — Stormfront Studios, Atari; Grand Theft Auto: San Andreas — Rockstar North; Half-Life 2 — Valve, Vivendi Universal Games; Psi-Ops: The Mindgate Conspiracy — Midway Games
**Outstanding Achievement in Animation**: **Half-Life 2** — **Valve**, **Vivendi Universal Games**‡; Jak 3 — Naughty Dog, Sony Computer Entertainment; Prince of Persia: Warrior Within — Ubisoft Montreal; Ratchet & Clank: Up Your Arsenal — Insomniac Games, Sony Computer Entertainment; Sly 2: Band of Thieves — Sucker Punch Productions, Sony Computer Entertainment	**Outstanding Achievement in Art Direction**: **Half-Life 2** — **Valve**, **Vivendi Universal Games**‡; Doom 3 — id Software, Activision; Metroid Prime 2: Echoes — Retro Studios, Nintendo; Prince of Persia: Warrior Within — Ubisoft Montreal; Sly 2: Band of Thieves — Sucker Punch Productions, Sony Computer Entertainment
**Outstanding Character Performance - Male**: **Robert Guillaume** as **Dr. Eli Vance** (**Half-Life 2**) — **Valve**, **Vivendi Universal Games**‡; Daniel Riordan as Rannek (Forgotten Realms: Demon Stone) — Stormfront Studios, Atari; David Hayter as Naked Snake (Metal Gear Solid 3: Snake Eater) — Konami; Cary Elwes as The Bard (The Bard's Tale) — inXile Entertainment; Vin Diesel as Riddick (The Chronicles of Riddick: Escape from Butcher Bay) — Starbreeze Studios, Vivendi Universal Games	**Outstanding Character Performance - Female**: **Judi Dench** as **M** (**GoldenEye: Rogue Agent**) — **EA Los Angeles**‡; Vanessa Marshall as Zhai (Forgotten Realms: Demon Stone) — Stormfront Studios, Atari; Linda Currie (Zoo Tycoon 2) — Blue Fang Games, Microsoft Game Studios
**Outstanding Achievement in Soundtrack**: **Grand Theft Auto: San Andreas** — **Rockstar North**‡; Donkey Konga — Namco, Nintendo; Need for Speed: Underground 2 — EA Black Box; Tony Hawk's Underground 2 — Neversoft, Activision	**Outstanding Achievement in Original Musical Composition**: **Fable** — **Lionhead Studios**, **Microsoft Game Studios**‡; Katamari Damacy — Namco; Killzone — Guerrilla Games, Sony Computer Entertainment; NBA Ballers — Midway Games; Rome: Total War — Creative Assembly, Activision
**Outstanding Achievement in Sound Design**: **Halo 2** — **Bungie**, **Microsoft Game Studios**‡; Doom 3 — id Software, Activision; Ratchet & Clank: Up Your Arsenal — Insomniac Games, Sony Computer Entertainment; Rome: Total War — Creative Assembly, Activision; Sly 2: Band of Thieves — Sucker Punch Productions, Sony Computer Entertainment	**Outstanding Achievement in Gameplay Engineering**: **Half-Life 2** — **Valve**, **Vivendi Universal Games**‡; Donkey Konga — Namco, Nintendo; EyeToy: AntiGrav — Harmonix, Sony Computer Entertainment; Fable — Lionhead Studios, Microsoft Game Studios; Spider-Man 2 — Treyarch, Activision
**Outstanding Achievement in Online Gameplay**: **Halo 2** — **Bungie**, **Microsoft Game Studios**‡; Rome: Total War — Creative Assembly, Activision; Unreal Tournament 2004 — Epic Games, Digital Extremes, Atari; Warhammer 40,000: Dawn of War — Relic Entertainment, THQ	**Outstanding Achievement in Visual Engineering**: **Half-Life 2** — **Valve**, **Vivendi Universal Games**‡; Doom 3 — id Software, Activision; Forgotten Realms: Demon Stone — Stormfront Studios, Atari; Metroid Prime 2: Echoes — Retro Studios, Nintendo; Ratchet & Clank: Up Your Arsenal — Insomniac Games, Sony Computer Entertainment

=== Genre Awards ===
==== Console ====
**Console Platform Action/Adventure Game of the Year**: **Prince of Persia: Warrior Within** — **Ubisoft Montreal**‡; Jak 3 — Naughty Dog, Sony Computer Entertainment; Ratchet & Clank: Up Your Arsenal — Insomniac Games, Sony Computer Entertainment	**Console Action/Adventure Game of the Year**: **Grand Theft Auto: San Andreas** — **Rockstar North**‡; Full Spectrum Warrior — Pandemic Studios, THQ; Metal Gear Solid 3: Snake Eater — Konami; Pikmin 2 — Nintendo EAD; Psi-Ops: The Mindgate Conspiracy — Midway Games; Tom Clancy's Splinter Cell: Pandora Tomorrow — Ubisoft
**Console Action Sports Game of the Year**: **Tony Hawk's Underground 2** — **Neversoft**, **Activision**‡; Mario Power Tennis — Camelot Software Planning, Nintendo; NBA Ballers — Midway Games; NFL Street 2 — EA Tiburon	**Console First-Person Action Game of the Year**: **Halo 2** — **Bungie**, **Microsoft Game Studios**‡; GoldenEye: Rogue Agent — EA Los Angeles; Killzone — Guerrilla Games, Sony Computer Entertainment; Metroid Prime 2: Echoes — Retro Studios, Nintendo; The Chronicles of Riddick: Escape from Butcher Bay — Starbreeze Studios, Vivendi Universal Games
**Console Children's Title of the Year**: **Sly 2: Band of Thieves** — **Sucker Punch Productions**, **Sony Computer Entertainment**‡; Backyard Baseball 2005 — Humongous Entertainment, Atari; Mario Party 6 — Hudson Soft, Nintendo; Pokémon Colosseum — Genius Sonority, Nintendo; Shrek 2 — Luxoflux, Activision	**Fighting Game of the Year**: **Mortal Kombat: Deception** — **Midway Games**‡; Def Jam: Fight for NY — AKI Corporation, EA Canada; Dragon Ball Z: Budokai 3 — Dimps, Bandai, Atari
**Console Family Game of the Year**: **Donkey Konga** — **Namco**, **Nintendo**‡; EyeToy: AntiGrav — Harmonix, Sony Computer Entertainment; Karaoke Revolution Volume 3 — Harmonix, Konami; WarioWare, Inc.: Mega Party Games! — Nintendo R&D1	**Racing Game of the Year**: **Burnout 3: Takedown** — **Criterion Games**, **Electronic Arts**‡; Rallisport Challenge 2 — DICE, Microsoft Game Studios
**Console Role-Playing Game of the Year**: **Paper Mario: The Thousand-Year Door** — **Intelligent Systems**, **Nintendo**‡; Final Fantasy Crystal Chronicles — Square Enix, Nintendo; Tales of Symphonia — Namco Tales Studio; The Bard's Tale — inXile Entertainment; X-Men Legends — Raven Software, Activision	**Console Sports Simulation Game of the Year**: **ESPN NFL 2K5** — **Visual Concepts**, **Sega**‡; ESPN NHL 2K5 — Kush Games, Sega; Madden NFL 2005 — EA Tiburon; World Soccer Winning Eleven 7 International — Konami

==== Handheld ====
**Wireless Game of the Year**: **Super Mario 64 DS** — **Nintendo EAD**‡; Pokémon FireRed and LeafGreen — Game Freak, Nintendo	**Handheld Game of the Year**: **Metroid: Zero Mission** — **Nintendo R&D1**‡; Kingdom Hearts: Chain of Memories — Square Enix; Super Mario 64 DS — Nintendo EAD

==== Computer ====
**Computer Action/Adventure Game of the Year**: **Tom Clancy's Splinter Cell: Pandora Tomorrow** — **Ubisoft**‡; Full Spectrum Warrior — Pandemic Studios, THQ; Myst IV: Revelation — Ubisoft Montreal; The Suffering — Surreal Software, Midway Games	**Computer Children's Game of the Year**: **Backyard Skateboarding** — **Humongous Entertainment**, **Atari**‡
**Downloadable Game of the Year**: **The Incredibles: Escape from Nomanisan Island** — **Backbone Entertainment**, **Disney Interactive**‡; Diner Dash — Gamelab, PlayFirst; Mahjong Garden To Go — Pogo.com, Electronic Arts; Shroomz - Quest for Puppy — The Planet, Gametrust Inc.	**Computer Family Game of the Year**: **Zoo Tycoon 2** — **Blue Fang Games**, **Microsoft Game Studios**‡; Harry Potter and the Prisoner of Azkaban — KnowWonder, EA UK; Scrabble Online — Boston Animation, Atari
**Computer First-Person Action Game of the Year**: **Half-Life 2** — **Valve**, **Vivendi Universal Games**‡; Doom 3 — id Software, Activision; Joint Operations: Typhoon Rising — NovaLogic; Medal of Honor: Pacific Assault — EA Los Angeles; Unreal Tournament 2004 — Epic Games, Digital Extremes, Atari	**Computer Role-Playing Game of the Year**: **Neverwinter Nights: Kingmaker** — **BioWare**, **Atari**‡; Vampire: The Masquerade - Bloodlines — Troika Games, Activision
**Simulation Game of the Year**: **The Sims 2** — **Maxis**, **Electronic Arts**‡; Pacific Fighters — 1C:Maddox Games, Ubisoft; RollerCoaster Tycoon 3 — Frontier Developments, Atari	**Computer Sports Game of the Year**: **Tiger Woods PGA Tour 2005** — **EA Redwood Shores**‡
**Strategy Game of the Year**: **Rome: Total War** — **Creative Assembly**, **Activision**‡; The Lord of the Rings: The Battle for Middle-earth — EA Los Angeles; Warhammer 40,000: Dawn of War — Relic Entertainment, THQ

==== Online Awards ====
**Massive Multiplayer/Persistent World Game of the Year**
- **World of Warcraft** — **Blizzard Entertainment**, **Vivendi Universal Games**‡
  - City of Heroes — Cryptic Studios, NCSoft
  - Final Fantasy XI: Chains of Promathia — Square Enix, Sony Computer Entertainment
  - Star Wars Galaxies: Jump to Lightspeed — Sony Online Entertainment, LucasArts

=== Hall of Fame Award ===
- Trip Hawkins

=== Multiple nominations and awards ===
==== Multiple Nominations ====
Games that received multiple nominations
Nominations	Game
11	Half-Life 2
6	Doom 3
6	Grand Theft Auto: San Andreas
6	Halo 2
5	Fable
5	Katamari Damacy
5	Ratchet & Clank: Up Your Arsenal
5	Rome: Total War
4	City of Heroes
4	Donkey Konga
4	Forgotten Realms: Demon Stone
4	Sly 2: Band of Thieves
3	EyeToy: AntiGrav
3	Metroid Prime 2: Echoes
3	Prince of Persia: Warrior Within
3	World of Warcraft
2	Burnout 3: Takedown
2	GoldenEye: Rogue Agent
2	Full Spectrum Warrior
2	Jak 3
2	Killzone
2	Metal Gear Solid 3: Snake Eater
2	NBA Ballers
2	Psi-Ops: The Mindgate Conspiracy
2	Super Mario 64 DS
2	The Bard's Tale
2	The Chronicles of Riddick: Escape from Butcher Bay
2	The Sims 2
2	Tom Clancy's Splinter Cell: Pandora Tomorrow
2	Tony Hawk's Underground 2
2	Unreal Tournament 2004
2	Warhammer 40,000: Dawn of War
2	Zoo Tycoon 2

Nominations by company
Nominations	Games	Company
18	12	Nintendo
18	7	Sony Computer Entertainment
17	7	Activision
16	3	Vivendi Universal Games
15	12	Electronic Arts
14	4	Microsoft Game Studios
13	8	Atari
11	1	Valve
10	3	Namco
7	4	Ubisoft
6	4	Midway Games
6	1	Bungie
6	1	id Software
6	1	Rockstar North
5	1	Lionhead Studios
5	1	Creative Assembly
5	1	Insomniac Games
4	3	Konami
4	2	THQ
4	2	Harmonix
4	1	Cryptic Studios
4	1	NCSoft
4	1	Stormfront Studios
4	1	Sucker Punch Productions
3	1	Square Enix
3	1	Blizzard Entertainment
3	1	Retro Studios
2	2	Humongous Entertainment
2	1	Blue Fang Games
2	1	Criterion Games
2	1	Digital Extremes
2	1	Epic Games
2	1	Guerrilla Games
2	1	inXile Entertainment
2	1	Maxis
2	1	Naughty Dog
2	1	Neversoft
2	1	Pandemic Studios
2	1	Relic Entertainment
2	1	Starbreeze Studios

==== Multiple awards ====
Games that received multiple awards
Awards	Game
9	Half-Life 2
4	Halo 2
2	Fable
2	Grand Theft Auto: San Andreas
2	Katamari Damacy

Awards by company
Awards	Games	Company
10	2	Vivendi Universal Games
9	1	Valve
7	3	Microsoft Game Studios
4	4	Nintendo
3	3	Electronic Arts
3	2	Namco
2	2	Activision
2	2	Atari
2	2	Ubisoft
2	1	Rockstar North
