= Self-Defense Training Camp =

2011 video game

- North American cover art
- Developer: AMA Studios
- Publisher: Ubisoft
- Series: My Coach
- Platform: Xbox 360
- Release: NA: November 8, 2011; AU: November 10, 2011; EU: November 11, 2011
- Genre: Sports
- Mode: Single-player

Self-Defense Training Camp is a sports video game developed by British studio AMA Studios and published by Ubisoft for the Xbox 360, and was released in North America on November 8, 2011. The game was also released in the PAL region under the title My Self Defence Coach on November 10–11, 2011. The game utilizes the Kinect motion peripheral. Ubisoft claimed the game will "help players develop the self-confidence they need to react more efficiently when facing troublesome situations, and allows players to discover ways of protecting themselves from various forms of physical assault."

Upon release, the game received negative reviews from critics.

== Gameplay ==
Self-Defense Training Camp involves teaching players how to perform martial arts-based techniques and various forms of tai chi, along with self defense. There are four selectable game modes on the main menu: "Cardio Workout", "Balance Practices", "Self Defense Rehearsal", and "Reflex Training". In "Cardio Workout", players perform "martial arts fitness workouts", such as punches and kicks. "Balance Practices" involves doing yoga-style stretches. In "Self Defense Rehearsal", there are five sessions consisting of six activities for players to play, which simply involve performing a move such as kicking an opponent's crotch. "Reflex Training" involves dodging from opposing punches.

== Reception ==
Reception

Aggregate score
Aggregator	Score
Metacritic	21/100

Review scores
Publication	Score
GameZone	6/10
IGN	1/10
Jeuxvideo.com	11/20
Official Xbox Magazine (US)	3.5/10

Self-Defense Training Camp received "generally unfavorable reviews" according to the review aggregation website Metacritic. IGN criticized the game's graphical quality (with characters that "move like busted, confused robots"), poorly implemented motion detection, and the game's concept as a whole—since players would not be applying the techniques they are learning to physical targets. Official Xbox Magazine said that the game "implies you can easily learn how to break free of any hold without any proper feedback, practice, or, you know, another person there", criticized its "bland" supplemental content, and also noticed the game had "a weird preoccupation with going for the groin." GameZone noted that the game puts a large amount of emphasis on workouts, but stated that players "can probably work out more of a sweat playing Dance Central or Kinect Sports."

IGN named it one of the worst games of 2011, and GamesRadar+ ranked the game 37th in their "The Worst Games of All Time".

== See also ==
- List of video games notable for negative reception
