= My Weight Loss Coach =

2008 video game

My Weight-Loss Coach
- Developer: Ubisoft Montreal
- Publisher: Ubisoft
- Series: My Coach
- Platforms: Nintendo DS, iOS
- Release: AU: June 19, 2008; EU: June 20, 2008; NA: June 24, 2008
- Genre: Simulation
- Mode: Single-player

My Weight Loss Coach (known as My Health Coach: Manage Your Weight in Europe) is a game for the Nintendo DS portable video game system. It was released on June 24, 2008 by Ubisoft and developed by Ubisoft Montreal. The purpose of the game is to motivate players to reach and maintain a healthy lifestyle and target weight. In addition the game was developed with nutritionists, and includes a free pedometer to help provide the user with better results.

== Playing the game ==
While playing the game users create a personal profile to track performance and map out objectives based on personal information. While users continue to eat and participate in a healthy lifestyle, they are encouraged to input daily eating and exercise habits in order to achieve virtual rewards. The free pedometer is intended to be used to help players keep track of their physical fitness and can be updated through their Nintendo DS. By receiving immediate feedback from their device, users are also encouraged to challenge themselves.

== How the game works ==
Section 1: Personalize: While personalizing their profile (including information such as age, weight, height, etc....) users are asked a series of questions in order for the game to get a better understanding of their goals. Upon the completion and submission of information and objectives, the game will calculate BMI (Body Mass Index), and create a program best suited for them.

Section 2: Daily objectives: Based on personal needs, preferences, and goals, players can determine how they intend on achieving a healthier lifestyle. The game will then create daily sessions in order to provide users with strategies to overcome specific challenges with a positive attitude. And, at the end of each day, players are encouraged to input daily physical activity, and recorded information from the pedometer, in order to yield better results.

Section 3: Challenges: The game also includes daily and weekly challenges intended to keep players motivated and on top of their goals. With up to 500 challenges, all catered to specific objectives, the game aims to provide players with a fun way to stay on track of their healthy lifestyle.

Section 4: Progress tracking: Finally, the game reminds users of their accomplishments. With the use of graphs and charts, My Weight Loss Coach keeps a record of players’ achievements and allows them to access information on all recorded data, including: view your steps, energy balance (the balance between a players food intake and physical activity), and weight and BMI.

== Reception ==
IGN rated the game a 7, and said that: "My Weight Loss Coach isn't some cure-all casual game, but it's a neat companion to a full-on workout, or a great way to learn a bit more about the much-needed lifestyle change that comes with working out and eating right."

IT Reviews was a bit less enthusiastic, commenting that the game was "more of an informational guide than a motivational tool and even in this light the results and dietary advice on offer mostly consist of ball-park estimations that will have little impact on fine-tuning a lifestyle. Shop around and you'll find it available cheaply, however, so DS owners who may have considered buying a pedometer could do far worse than pick up this application for its additional feedback and ability to record and store daily activity."

EuroGamer said that: "As an actual coach it really only works in general terms: there's no way to finely tailor the experience for your own capabilities in ways that an actual person could, and there's not much to commit you if the determination lapses."
