= My Coach =

- Platforms: Nintendo DS, PlayStation Portable, Wii, iPhone/iPod Touch, PlayStation 3, Xbox 360
- Release: 2007-2011
- Genre: Educational game
- Modes: Single player, Multiplayer

My Coach is a series of video games released by Ubisoft mainly for the Nintendo DS and Wii gaming systems. Pauline Jacquey, the series producer, has described the series as a tool for "developing projects that make people feel that playing games is worth their while, allowing them to spend quality time with family and friends, learn a new skill, or improve their daily lives.”

Ubisoft has released several games in the series, such as My Word Coach, a 2007 Wii and DS title meant to help people with their vocabulary and verbal communication, and My Stop Smoking Coach: Allen Carr's EasyWay, a game which many years after its 2008 release gained ground on YouTube for its oddity, with YouTubers making videos playing and making fun of the game. Two Product Managers based out of San Francisco, Chris Ferriter and Brian Cho, were credited for launching the iOS versions in 2009, which became Ubisoft's first mobile app on the iTunes App Store.

== Games ==
Title	Year	Platforms	Additional information
My French Coach	2007	Nintendo DS, Wii	Known as My French Coach Level 1: Beginners in Europe and Australia on the Nintendo DS.
My French Coach Level 2: Intermediate	2007	Nintendo DS	
My Spanish Coach	2007	Nintendo DS, Wii, PlayStation Portable	Known as My Spanish Coach Level 1: Beginners in Europe and Australia on the Nintendo DS.
My Spanish Coach Level 2: Intermediate	2007	Nintendo DS	
My Word Coach	2007	Nintendo DS, Wii, iPhone/iPod Touch	
My Weight Loss Coach	2008	Nintendo DS, iPhone/iPod Touch	Known as My Health Coach: Manage Your Weight in Europe.
My Chinese Coach	2008	Nintendo DS, iPhone/iPod Touch	
My SAT Coach	2008	Nintendo DS	
My Dog Coach: Understand Your Dog with Cesar Millan	2008	Nintendo DS	Known as Cesar Millan's Dog Whisperer in North America.
My Japanese Coach	2008	Nintendo DS, iPhone/iPod Touch	
My Stop Smoking Coach: Allen Carr's EasyWay	2008	Nintendo DS	Known as My Health Coach: Stop Smoking with Allen Carr in Europe.
My Fun Facts Coach	2008	Nintendo DS	
My Fitness Coach	2008	Wii	Originally released as Yourself!Fitness for Xbox, PlayStation 2 and Windows.
Mi experto en alemán (My German Coach)	2008	Nintendo DS	Released in Spanish only.
My English Coach	2009	Nintendo DS	
My Healthy Cooking Coach	2009	Nintendo DS	
My Fitness Coach: Cardio Workout	2009	Wii	Known as Gold's Gym: Cardio Workout in North America and Australia and Shape Boxing: Wii de Enjoy! Diet in Japan.
My Fitness Coach 2: Exercise and Nutrition	2010	Wii	
My Fitness Coach: Dance Workout	2010	Wii	Known as Gold's Gym: Dance Workout in North America and Shape Boxing 2: Wii de Enjoy Diet! in Japan.
My Fitness Coach Club	2011	Wii, PlayStation 3	
My Self Defence Coach	2011	Xbox 360	Known as Self-Defense Training Camp in North America.
My Life Coach	Cancelled	Nintendo DS	
