= SpyToy =

2005 video game

- Developer: London Studio
- Publisher: Sony Computer Entertainment
- Series: EyeToy
- Platform: PlayStation 2
- Release: EU: 14 October 2005; AU: 20 October 2005; NA: 15 November 2005
- Genre: Action
- Mode: Single player

SpyToy (EyeToy: Operation Spy in North America) is a 2005 video game developed by London Studio and published by Sony Computer Entertainment for the PlayStation 2. It utilizes the EyeToy camera peripheral to detect player movement.

== Gameplay ==
The main objective of the game is to guard a room from an intruder. Unique features include new face recognition technology, new video messaging, and interactive missions. If an intruder is caught, the next time the player returns to the room they can watch the recorded video of who came in. The concept for EyeToy: Operation Spy was derived from a game within EyeToy: Play 2, which also had a similar minigame.

== Reception ==
Reception

Aggregate score
Aggregator	Score
Metacritic	53/100

Review scores
Publication	Score
Game Informer	6/10
GameSpot	5.9/10
GameSpy	2/5
GameZone	7/10
IGN	6/10
PlayStation Official Magazine – UK	5/10
Official U.S. PlayStation Magazine	2/5
PALGN	5/10
PlayStation: The Official Magazine	5.5/10
X-Play	2/5

The game received "mixed" reviews according to the review aggregation website Metacritic.
