= EyeToy: Play 3 =

2005 video game

- Developer(s): London Studio
- Publisher(s): Sony Computer Entertainment
- Composer(s): Richard Jacques; Matt Coldrick; Justin Proo Esgay
- Series: EyeToy
- Platform(s): PlayStation 2
- Release: EU: 4 November 2005; AU: 10 November 2005
- Genre(s): Party
- Mode(s): Single-player, multiplayer

EyeToy: Play 3 is a 2005 minigame compilation video game developed by London Studio and published by Sony Computer Entertainment for the PlayStation 2. It is the third game in the EyeToy: Play series and the sequel to EyeToy: Play 2. Unlike its predecessors, it was not released outside PAL regions. The camera takes snapshots during the game for your player and is a requirement to play the game. Unlike previous EyeToy: Play games, Play 3 was not released in North America. Unlike the previous games, 4 players were able to play on screen at the same time as opposed to taking it in turns like the previous games.

== Game list ==
- Volleyball - two teams play beach volleyball.
- Bowling - play 10-pin bowling against up to three friends.
- Touchdown - compete for the American Football Touchdown Trophy.
- DJ - entertain crowds as a DJ.
- Be The Band - perform in front of an audience as a band.
- Maestro - conduct a group of musicians.
- Boot Camp - follow the sergeant's orders and tackle grueling assault courses.
- Beauty Salon - work in the salon as a professional beauty technician.
- Ghost Grab - bravely explore the Haunted Mansion.
- Monkey Rampage - crush the most buildings by winning minigames.
- Kitty Loves Me - compete against up to three other friends to win the affections of a kitten.
- Athletics - compete in a variety of track and field events to become world champion.

== Extras ==
Alongside the games, there was also the PlayRoom where the player could mess around with the motion capabilities of the camera including making special effect such as glitter or rainbows from their bodies, as well as annoying a beehive by tapping it to unleash a swarm of deadly bees that will follow the player as they move and will only go back to the beehive if the players restrict own movement.

PlayRoom:

- Laboratory
  - Face Mixer - Merge faces together
  - Head Swap - Swap faces with a friend
  - Photo Booth - Taking photos and saving them to a USB Mass Storage Device connected to the PS2.
  - Recog-Cam - Discovering the hidden secrets of EyeToy Play 3
- Fun
  - Theremin - Create Wacky Sounds in this noise PlayRoom activity.
  - Vs Knockout - Take Part in crazy, back-to-front kung fu combat with a friend
  - Wild Fauna - Chill out and stay still as the player can turn own room into a woodland paradise. Watch trees and grass grow before your eyes, and really go to appreciate Mother Nature.
  - Motion-Cam - There are all kinds of special effects to be found in the Motion-Cam mode.

There was also the Recog Cam option. Here, if the players were to show a particular card (basically an image) in front of the camera while in this mode, it will activate something within the game. 3 of these cards were available on the manual supplied with the game. One of them was the logo of the then upcoming game, EyeToy Kinetic. Displaying that card in front of the camera would activate a video promoting the game. After the video, some information on the game would then show up where they could go Next to read more. Additional prints could have been downloaded from www.eyetoy.com to unlock further hidden secrets. The size of the pages was 1 page of a PS2 manual page.

== Reception ==
Reception

Aggregate score
Aggregator	Score
Metacritic	61/100

Review scores
Publication	Score
Eurogamer	5/10
PlayStation Official Magazine – UK	6/10
PALGN	6.5/10
Play	70%
PSM3	70%

The game received "mixed" reviews according to the review aggregation website Metacritic.
