= My Word Coach =

2007 video game

- Developer: Ubisoft Montreal / Ubisoft Quebec
- Publisher: Ubisoft
- Designer: Peter Yang
- Series: My Coach
- Platforms: Nintendo DS, Wii, iOS
- Release: November 6, 2007: Nintendo DS; NA: November 6, 2007; AU: November 7, 2007; EU: November 16, 2007 Wii; NA: November 6, 2007; EU: November 16, 2007; AU: November 22, 2007 iOS; NA: November 12, 2008; EU: November 12, 2008; AU: November 12, 2008
- Genres: Self improvement, Education
- Modes: Single-player, Multiplayer

My Word Coach is a video game from Ubisoft for the Nintendo DS, Wii and iOS. It involves English vocabulary, and is intended to develop the ability to express oneself clearly and with confidence, using a system called Expression Potential, or EP. It uses words and definitions from the Cambridge Advanced Learner's Dictionary. The data of three players may be saved on to one copy, and one can compete on the Nintendo DS and Wii platforms using Nintendo Wi-Fi Connection.

== Gameplay ==
There are six single-player training exercises, as well as four games for recreation, one for wireless services. The single-player training exercises are: Missing Letter, Split Decision, Word Shuffle, Pasta Letters, Block Letters, and Safecracker. These four recreation games are: Competition, Cube Panic, Speed Letters, and Multi-Card Play. In addition, there are three difficulties: Easy, Medium, and Hard. All games initially only have their Easy difficulty available, with harder difficulties unlocked over time.

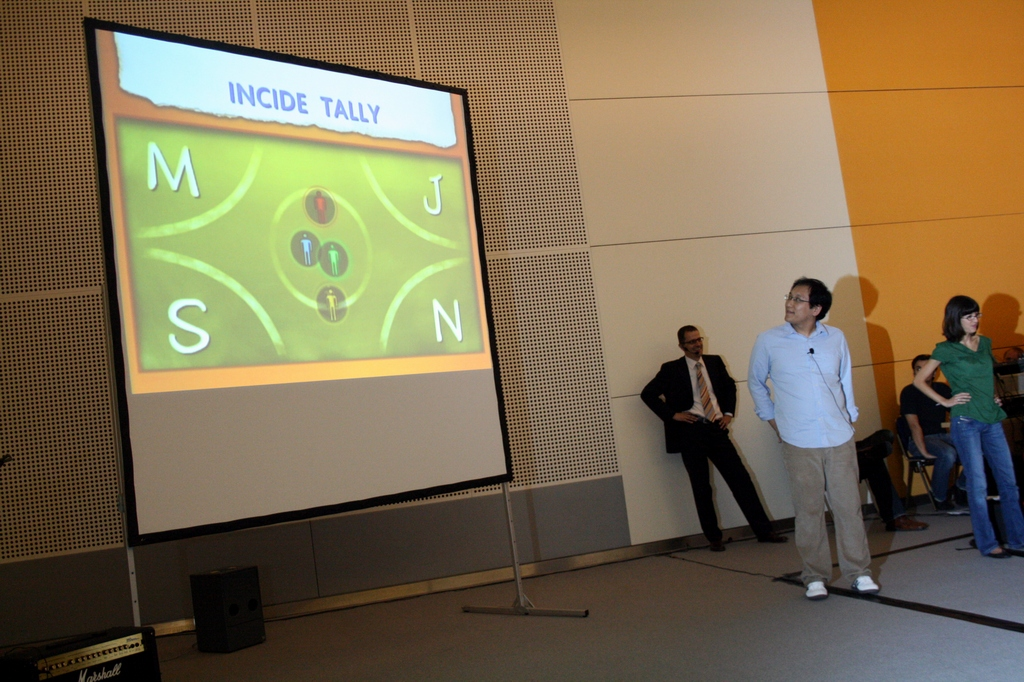
Showing of an early build of My Word Coach at a Ubisoft press conference

The Wii version of the game also includes a feature that allows the player to wirelessly connect to a Nintendo DS, allowing the player use its touchscreen as input.

== Reception ==
The game received "mixed or average" reception from review aggregator Metacritic. Critics praised the game for its educational value, but critiqued its lack of content and variety, requiring long play sessions in order to progress, and inconsistent handwriting recognition.

Reception

Aggregate score
Aggregator	Score
Metacritic	68/100 (Note: Based on eight critic reviews, one positive and seven mixed)

Review scores
Publication	Score
GamesRadar+	3.5/5
GameZone	65/100
IGN	6.8/10
Nintendo World Report	6.5/10
