= Respondesign =

American video game developer

responDesign, Inc. was an American video game developer focused on exergaming. It was founded in 2003 by Ted Spooner, Phineas Barnes, and Daryn Chapman in Portland, Oregon, around the concept of a virtual personal trainer for video game consoles. The company operated under the name RespondWell for a period before its acquisition, a name since retired and subsequently adopted by an unrelated entity.

== History ==
The company's flagship product was Yourself! Fitness, a program that guided users through exercise routines on home gaming consoles.

In 2004, responDesign Inc. was sued, along with Microsoft, by writer Roger Avary. The suit alleged unauthorized use of Avary's Virtual Yoga concept in a game developed in partnership with Microsoft. Chief Executive Ted Spooner disputed the allegation.

In 2006, the company entered into an agreement with McDonald's to distribute four Yourself! Fitness titles alongside the chain's healthier meal options for a four-week period.

In October 2016, the company was acquired by Zimmer Biomet Holdings for an undisclosed sum. Following the acquisition, the RespondWell name was retired.

The RespondWell trademark (USPTO Serial No. 86292196) was cancelled on September 24, 2021 under Section 8 for failure to file a declaration of continued use, confirming the name was no longer in active commercial use.

=== Unrelated use of the RespondWell name ===
As of 2026, the name RespondWell is used by RespondWell, LLC, a Colorado-based direct-to-consumer telehealth platform serving first responders. The company is unrelated to responDesign, Inc. or Zimmer Biomet. RespondWell, LLC connects firefighters, law enforcement officers, emergency medical personnel, and dispatchers with licensed healthcare providers and licensed pharmacies for prescription wellness treatments. The platform is LegitScript-certified.

On September 1, 2026, the United States Patent and Trademark Office issued a new registration for the RespondWell mark to RespondWell, LLC (Serial No. 99652441, Registration No. 8421739).

== See also ==
- Serious games
