= Yellow Taxi Goes Vroom =

2024 video game

- Developer: Panik Arcade
- Publisher: Those Awesome Guys
- Directors: Lorenzo Tombasi; Matthew Godwarf
- Designer: Matthew Godwarf
- Programmer: Matthew Godwarf
- Artist: Lorenzo Tombasi
- Composer: Jacob Lincke
- Platform: Windows
- Release: April 9, 2024
- Genre: Platformer
- Mode: Single-player

Yellow Taxi Goes Vroom is a 2024 platformer game developed by the Italian indie studio Panik Arcade and published by Those Awesome Guys. In the game, the player controls a taxi, which they must guide through an island to unravel its mystery. The game was released for Windows on April 9, 2024, and has been met with praise for its gameplay, soundtrack, and graphics but criticism for its story.

== Gameplay ==
In the game, the player's main mission is to investigate the "grand conspiracy" on Grandma's Island, while collecting green gears scattered across each level. Gears unlock more levels, and the player can optionally collect coins and springs.

The player controls a wind-up taxi that can be braked, flipped, accelerated, or driven on ramps; however, the player cannot make the taxi jump. They may use a cancellable dash ability (termed the Flip-o-Will) to break through blocks and can drive towards obstacles such as bounce pads to navigate the area. In some levels of the game, the player has to pick up passengers and drive them to their destination within a set amount of time.

In June 2024, a new mode named Psycho Taxi was released. Instead of collecting objects, the player must carry around passengers.

== Plot ==
The Tosla Corporation and its CEO Alien Mosk has littered the world with green gears and poisoned the world's oil supply. A character is transformed into a taxi to collect them.

== Development and release ==
Yellow Taxi Goes Vroom was developed by the Italian indie studio Panik Arcade, a two-person team. The game was announced in February 2023, with the release of a game demo. In October 2023, it was featured at the Steam Next Fest and EGX 2023. Yellow Taxi Goes Vroom was released for Windows on April 9, 2024.

== Reception ==
Reception

Aggregate scores
Aggregator	Score
Metacritic	78/100
OpenCritic	75% recommend

Review scores
Publication	Score
Destructoid	8/10
TouchArcade	4.5/5

On the review aggregation website Metacritic, the game has a "generally favorable" score of 78 based on five critics. Fellow review aggregator OpenCritic assessed that the game received strong approval, being recommended by 75% of critics.

Destructoid's Zoey Handley noted the game's variety in worlds but criticized that the game's humor has jokes that are "all over the place". However, Mikhail Madnani of TouchArcade described the gameplay as "hard to put down". While commending the sound design, she also felt that a portion of the gears were difficult to find and obtain. Shaun Cichaki of The Escapist thought the game was a "knock-off" of Crazy Taxi.

Critics noticed the game's similarities to Nintendo 64 games and praised its graphics. Handley praised how well the game replicated the early 3D platformer genre and compared the game's "appealing" visuals to Katamari Damacy, which Madnani also praised. Commenting on the soundtrack, she stated that the music sounded like those from Super Mario Galaxy combined with "Head, Shoulders, Knees and Toes".
