= Dance Factory (video game) =

2006 video game

- European cover art
- Developer: Broadsword Interactive
- Publisher: Codemasters
- Composer: Allister Brimble
- Platform: PlayStation 2
- Release: NA: August 29, 2006; EU: September 1, 2006; AU: September 14, 2006
- Genre: Music
- Modes: Single-player, multiplayer

Dance Factory is a PlayStation 2 game developed by Broadsword Interactive and published by Codemasters. It has been compared with Dance Dance Revolution, but unlike the Dance Dance Revolution series Dance Factory can generate dance moves from any music CD. It can be played with any PlayStation controller and allows input from the EyeToy camera, but the majority of gameplay is done with a foot-operated Dance pad and is available with or without a pad in the package.

== Modes ==
Dance Factory has a variety of modes:

- Endurance mode encompasses playing through the five licensed songs on the game, or an entire CD from the user's collection.
- Fitness mode is similar to Endurance mode. Weight is entered at the beginning which can be altered to the player's own weight, which can range from 10.00 kg to 200 kg. There is a calorie counter on the screen and mis-stepping displays "Pork Out" and "Gettin' Flabby" instead of "Miss". When a song is finished, the screen shows the number of calories burned and how far one would have to jog, swim or cycle to burn off the same number of calories burnt.
- Creature mode gives the user a dancing creature avatar for each CD (or the one that comes with the five original songs). The initial appearance depends upon the chosen CD but the user can use some of the points earned by dancing in order to buy clothing and accessories for the creature, rather than graphic background themes. These creature accessories alter the appearance of the head, eye, chest, back, waist or wrist of the creature.
- EyeToy mode allows the player to use the Sony camera as an input device as well as a conventional controller or dance mat.
- Multi-player modes include:
  - Competitive "battle" modes, such as the simultaneous two-player "Creature Battle" mode, in which combo dance sequences can trigger special attacks
  - Collaborative and "Tournament" modes for two to 16 players (taking turns)

Players can enter their own moves for any CD tracks and then use those instead of the automatically generated ones. These custom dances can be shared with other users who own the same CDs.

== Reception ==
Reviews of Dance Factory are diverse in both scope and appraisal. Some of the most positive have come from mainstream media rather than gaming specialists, but even the latter have disagreed greatly about both the concept and its execution:

On BBC radio Eurogamer editor Johnny Minkley enthused: "This is brilliant! Dancing games - these ones you buy the dance mats for - Dancing Stage has been the key series for years. And what you've never been able to do on it is use your own music. And this time, for the first time, you can take any CD in your collection, put it in the PS2, and it generates dance steps for you on the fly, or you can make your own. Now, I've been trying this out at home, and ... it works really, really well... it's just superb fun. So if you've ever liked this type of game before, but you've always felt restricted by the songs on there, I mean, this opens up your entire record collection ... it's just brilliant". - BBC National Radio 1, Sarah Cox Show, Tuesday 15 August 2006

The November 2006 review by Mark Blackmore, in BBC Focus magazine, was yet more excited: "Without hyperbole, this is the best thing to happen in all the universe, throughout history, since we emerged from the primordial ooze... if you've never danced to Morrisey while having your PS tell you you're a big fat sod, then you've missed out on one of the definitive human experiences".

The Times newspaper called Dance Factory "an instant classic" and awarded it a generous 5 out of 5 on 16 September 2006: "Although they are guaranteed to deliver a few laughs and lots of energetic posturing, the failing of most dance mat games is the dire selection of twangy hits licensed for the experience. Even Dance Factory comes with just five saccharine offerings, but then turns the genre on its head quite magnificently by allowing players to import their own CD tracks for fancy footwork treatment. It is not an especially fast process, with a four-minute track taking about a minute to convert for dance mat use, but the options that it brings are limited only by the tracks in your CD collection... The package also boasts some nifty secondary ideas to help to extend the title's replayability, such as a Fitness mode for calorie counters. Meanwhile, the multiplayer games include a knock-out tournament that can accommodate 16 players in rotation".

The US magazine Game Informer gave a score of 8/10, saying: "I'm going to go out on a limb here and offend a lot of DDR purists and tell you that this is the dance/rhythm action game you should play this year....So what's the deal? Dance Factory can take any CD you put into the PS2 and transfer all or any of the songs to danceable tracks - and I'm not talking cheap, non-rhythmic versions. The newly created dance tracks firmly match up with the song rhythms, especially if you find music you'd actually dance to in real life. The feature works great, and often creates some stellar fun from music that (gasp!) you'd actually want to listen to! ... The game's not perfect by any means, but this is an idea that is long overdue, and I, for one, think it deserves some props".

The October 2006 issue of Games. magazine said "Dance Factory's rather ingenious USP is that it allows you to put any CD into your PS2 and it will convert it into arrows for your dancing pleasure. Simple, but absolutely superb. And it works. After experimenting with tunes from Rage Against The Machine, Air, Metallica, Sway and even a bit of classic old-school house, it would seem Dance Factory cannot be beaten. Using the same technology that fueled Vib Ribbon, the game picks out beats immaculately, creating combo opportunities at every turn. Obviously, not every tune you pick will lead to a perfect 'dance', but half the fun of Vib Ribbon was finding which tunes worked best, and the same can be said of Dance Factory. This is a game that’s all about innovation, and this is the only way in which Konami’s dancing games could be bettered. Dance Factory is a superb product".

Gaming Age awarded the game 83%, braving comparisons with DDR and thereby contradicting other reviews, saying: "No matter where your loyalties lie in the DDR world, there is no denying that Dance Factory is taking the right steps (no pun intended) in designing new ideas that the group of thinkers at Konami haven't come up with yet.... What Dance Factory brings to the table is new features that improve the genre, along with recreating already popular and proven modes for fans of the series".

Yahoo! Games awarded 73%, saying: "Dance Factory is a clever concept, though it doesn't quite hit the bullseye. Its feature set would really do better on a machine with a built-in hard drive, so you could burn tracks to it instead of endlessly swapping out CDs. That said, it's still impressive what the game does with the PS2's memory and technology -- poor graphics notwithstanding".

Review scores in the UK and US Official PlayStation magazines differed by a factor of two, the UK magazine awarding 60% and saying: "A clever idea that's a laugh with the right kind of music, but is too random to be anything other than an occasional curiosity", whereas the US PlayStation: The Official Magazine rated it just 30%, commenting: "I still think a music-customizable rhythm game could be amazing, but Dance Factory falls short of the ideal". - June 2006, page 94.

Gaming Horizon scored it 46% and said: "Despite the fact that Konami’s series has a static playlist, you’re better off buying another version of DDR than dealing with this piece of crap called Dance Factory. Or better yet, just pop in a CD and groove your own way".

G4 TV awarded 40% and said: "The ability to make your own dance patterns is not a dumb idea per se. Dance Factory would be an interesting gimmick if it was attached to an otherwise good DDR clone".

== See also ==
- Dance pad
