= Yetisports =

Video game series

Yetisports is a series of online Flash games created in 2004 by Austrian studio Edelweiss Medienwerkst and later by ROOT9 Medialab.

== Original titles ==
=== Yetisports: Pingu Throw ===
Release date: January 19, 2004
Platforms: Flash, Mobile, PlayStation Portable, iOS, Android
In this game, the player must click the mouse to hit the penguin with a baseball bat. Depending on when the player clicks the mouse, the yeti will hit the penguin a long distance, a short distance, or not hit the penguin at all. The goal is to hit the penguin as far as you can. It was originally released for Flash and mobile devices in 2004. In 2009 (2010 in the USA), it was also released for the PlayStation Portable as part of its PlayStation minis line. There is also an iOS version. A second iOS version was also released, which is based on the PSP version. Later, a remake was released for iOS and Android featuring updated graphics.

=== Yetisports: Pingu Throw SE ===
Release date: 2010
Platforms: PC
A remake of Yetisports: Pingu Throw featuring updated graphics.

=== Yetisports: Pingu Throw HD ===
Platforms: iOS
An HD remake of Yetisports: Pingu Throw. It is based on the PSP version of Yetisports: Pingu Throw.

=== Yetisports: Orca Slap ===
Release date: February 12, 2004
Platforms: Flash, Mobile, iOS, Android
In this game, you must aim with the mouse cursor, and once you have aimed, you must click the mouse cursor to throw a snowball to hit a penguin towards a target. If the penguin hits the bullseye, you get the most points. It was originally released for Flash and mobile devices, and later, a remake was made for iOS and Android with updated graphics.

=== Yetisports: Seal Bounce ===
Release date: March 18, 2004
Platforms: Flash, Mobile, PC, iOS, Android
In this game, you play with 2 clicks of the mouse. The first click starts the yeti windmilling his arms (which holds a penguin), and the second click makes him release the penguin between two glaciers with seals sticking out at regular intervals. The seals hit the penguin higher, which is useful as the penguin will not go higher than 300 if thrown straight up, whereas with bounces it is possible to go substantially past 400. It was originally released in 2004 for Flash and mobile devices. In 2010, the game was remade for the PC featuring updated graphics. Later, the game was also remade for iOS and Android with updated graphics.

=== Yetisports: Albatros Overload ===
Release date: April 29, 2004
Platforms: Flash, Mobile, PC, iOS, Android
This game is set in Australia. The penguin stands on one side of a see-saw while the yeti stomps on the other end. If the stomp is executed with good timing, the penguin lands on an albatross flying overhead. The player then has control over when the albatross flaps its wings. The closer to the ground the bird flaps, the more efficient it is. When the albatross' energy bar (which slowly recharges when the bird is not flapping) reaches 0, the bird will soon crash. It was originally released in 2004 for Flash and mobile devices. In 2010, the game was remade for the PC featuring updated graphics. Later, the game was also remade for iOS and Android with updated graphics.

=== Yetisports: Flamingo Drive ===
Release date: June 17, 2004
Platforms: Flash, Mobile, PC, iOS, Android
This game, set in Africa, involves using a flamingo as a golf club to hit a penguin. The angle is set by clicking while an arrow points at various angles, and power is set by clicking while a bar moves up and down. You have five shots per game. There are many game elements that will affect the final score, such as giraffes, which will catch the penguin in their mouths and throw it further if the penguin flies near their heads; Elephants and acacias that block low shots; Vultures that catch the penguin, bring it lower and drop it, if it flies too high; and snakes that bounce the penguin higher if it hits them. There is always the same pattern of animals and trees: A giraffe at 0, an acacia at 1000, and a giraffe at 2000, for example. The pattern can be used to help determine the best angle of the first shot. It is definitely a lower angle, but the exact best angle is hard to achieve. A tiny difference can mean a score on the first shot of 350 or 1000. It was originally released in 2004 for Flash and mobile devices. In 2010, the game was remade for the PC featuring updated graphics. Later, the game was also remade for iOS and Android with updated graphics.

=== Yetisports: Ylympics ===
Release date: 2004
Platforms: Flash
This game is a compilation of Yetisports: Pingu Throw, Yetisports: Orca Slap, Yetisports: Seal Bounce, Yetisports: Albatros Overload, and Yetisports: Flamingo Drive. The player plays through the games in order. The game keeps the score for each game as well as the total score.

=== Yetisports: Big Wave ===
Release date: September 2, 2004
Platforms: Flash, iOS, Android
This game, controlled by the arrow keys, is the first of a series of games focusing more on the yeti, instead of the penguin and his attempts at flight. The yeti surfs up and down a big wave, trying to pull off tricks and hit penguins out of the air. The wave gradually shrinks until the end of the game. If you press the Y ("motivation") key, when playing the game, an unseen penguin loudly yodels, which then echoes in the background. It was originally released in 2004 for Flash. Later, the game was also remade for iOS and Android with updated graphics.

=== Yetisports: Stage Dive ===
Release date: September 15, 2004
Platforms: Flash, Mobile
Influenced by the new media on his travels the Yeti gets into rock music, and to prove his "popstar" credentials, dives headfirst into the mosh-pit where the penguins are headbanging. They struggle to the task of getting the Yeti around the room. The Yetis movements are controlled with the left mouse button: you have ten clicks to get the Yeti as far as possible. This game was released as a "special stage".

=== Yetisports: Snowboard Freeride ===
Release date: October 14, 2004
Platforms: Flash, Mobile, iOS, Android
In this game, the yeti snowboards down a long slope, racing 10 penguins. The slope has many jumps and ibexes that send the yeti into the air, where he can do tricks for points. The point is not to win the race, but to get the most points, though you get bonus points for doing well in the race. Hitting a penguin slows it down for a few seconds, but then the penguin gets angry and moves faster. It was originally released in 2004 for Flash and mobile devices. Later, the game was also remade for iOS and Android with updated graphics.

=== Yetisports: Jungle Swing ===
Release date: April 4, 2005
Platforms: Flash, Mobile, iOS, Android
This game involves swinging up a series of branches in a tree, jumping with a mouse click. It requires precise timing, as the angle of the jump changes based on when the click is. When the yeti jumps off a green branch, the branch turns gold. When the yeti jumps off a gold branch, the branch turns red. When the yeti jumps off a red branch, the branch falls off and 3 green branches grow on the 3 next branchless spaces. There are only 25 branches at the start, all of which are green, so to get to the top yeti must swing off of 9 different branches 3 times each to get to the top, as well as the 50 branches that must be climbed to get to the top at all. It was originally released in 2005 for Flash. Later, the game was also remade for iOS and Android with updated graphics.

=== Yetisports: Final Spit ===
Release date: July 7, 2005
Platforms: Flash, Mobile
In this game, the yeti has kidnapped a llama and makes it spit at penguins. The other animals don't like being spat at and spitting them costs points. Missing 10 penguins or running out of time ends the game. Hitting the ox gives you a time bonus. This was originally planned to be the final Yetisports game.

=== Yetisports X: Icicle Climb ===
Platforms: Flash, PC
In this game, the yeti has 12 icicles to throw into the side of a cliff. There is a penguin next to this cliff, and he jumps up the icicles. The only limitation is the fact that the penguin only jumps 1.2 meters up. It was originally released for Flash. In 2010, the game was remade for the PC featuring updated graphics. There is also a Christmas version of this game called Yetisports Xmas Climb.

=== Yetisports Game Pack: Vol. 1 ===
Platforms: Mobile
This game is a compilation of Yetisports: Pingu Throw, Yetisports: Orca Slap, Yetisports: Seal Bounce, and an exclusive game called "Penguin's Revenge". Despite the game being called Vol. 1, no other volumes were made.

=== Yetisports: Summer Games ===
Platforms: Mobile
This game is a compilation of Yetisports: Jungle Swing, Yetisports: Big Wave, Yetisports: Flamingo Drive, and Yetisports: Albatros Overload.

=== Yetisports: Christmas Candy Climb ===
Platforms: iOS
A port of Yetisports Xmas Climb.

=== Yetisports Collection 1 ===
Platforms: iOS, Android
A compilation of Yetisports: Pingu Throw, Yetisports: Orca Slap, Yetisports: Seal Bounce, and Yetisports: Albatros Overload.

=== Yetisports Collection 2 ===
Platforms: Android
A compilation of Yetisports: Flamingo Drive, Yetisports: Big Wave, Yetisports: Snowboard Freeride, and Yetisports: Jungle Swing.

=== Yetisports Penguin X Run ===
Platforms: iOS, Android
An endless runner game where you play as a penguin.

== Consoles ==
=== Yetisports Deluxe ===
Release date: September 2004
Platforms: PlayStation, PC
YetiSports Deluxe is a console version of the series, ported by Similis and published by JoWooD Productions. It contains four different games:

- Super Pingu Throw - An upgraded version of Yetisports: Pingu Throw.
- Ice Bear Attack - Similar to Super Pingu Throw, but the Penguins can hit polar bears on the ground for more air time.
- Super Orca Slap - An upgraded version of Yetisports: Orca Slap that activates a slot machine for bonus points when you get a bullseye.
- Pingu Dart - Similar to Super Orca Slap, except that you need to try to hit flashing targets on the dartboard.

The game also includes a multiplayer mode for up to 4 players.

=== Yetisports: World Tour ===
Release date: June 5, 2005
Platforms: PlayStation, PC
Once again developed by Similis and published by JoWooD Productions, Being released in 2005, Yetisports: World Tour is one of the last titles released for the PlayStation.

The game is a compilation of 10 exclusive Yetisports-themed games.

Single-player and multiplayer modes are included for all of the games.

=== Yetisports: Arctic Adventures ===
Release date: July 18, 2005
Platforms: PC, PlayStation 2, Xbox
Developed by Edelwiss and published by JoWooD Productions, Arctic Adventures features many of the games previously seen, but uses 3D environments as opposed to the 2D environments of the original games.

Each game contains 3 levels, and the game can be played with up to 8 players. The game also contains a campaign mode that can be played with 1 or 2 players.

The PlayStation 2 version also features bonus games that use the EyeToy camera peripheral. Although the packaging claims the game only works with the EyeToy, the peripheral is not required for the game as a whole.

==== Reception ====
The game got mostly bad reviews.

Magazin	Rating
Spieletipps	42/100
PC Games (Germany)	3/10
jeuxvideo	4/20
OXM UK	4/10
Game Master UK	48/100

=== Yetisports: Penguin Party Island ===
Platforms: Wii
Release date: October 14, 2010
The game is a compilation of nine exclusive Yetisports minigames, designed to be played with multiple players.
