= The Polar Express (video game) =

2004 video game

- European PlayStation 2 cover art
- Developers: Blue Tongue Entertainment (PS2, GC, PC); Tantalus Media (GBA)
- Publisher: THQ
- Director: Nick Hagger
- Producers: Nick Hagger; Kevin Chan
- Designers: Nick Hagger; Drew Morrow; Morten Brodersen
- Programmer: Graeme Webb
- Artist: Andrew Dyson
- Composer: Stephan Schütze
- Engine: RenderWare
- Platforms: Game Boy Advance; GameCube; Microsoft Windows; PlayStation 2
- Release: NA: November 2, 2004; AU: November 26, 2004; EU: December 16, 2004
- Genre: Action-adventure
- Mode: Single-player

The Polar Express is an action-adventure platform game based on the film of the same name. It was developed by Blue Tongue Entertainment for the PlayStation 2, GameCube and Microsoft Windows. An Xbox version was in development, but did not release. A version for the Game Boy Advance was developed by Tantalus Media. All versions of the game were published by THQ. It was released in North America on November 2, 2004, and in Europe on December 16, 2004.

== Gameplay ==
The game follows most of the main plot of the film. One major difference is that the Ebenezer Scrooge Puppet, who only makes a minor appearance in the film, plays a much bigger role as the main antagonist who attempts to prevent the children from believing in Santa Claus by stealing their tickets, and trying to get them thrown off the train to keep the children from getting to the North Pole. The game is broken down into six chapters, giving the player the opportunity to explore areas like the train, the North Pole, and more. The player controls a young boy in each of the 6 chapters. The game also contains puzzle-solving as well as some minigame-styled elements.

The Game Boy Advance version is a 2D side-scrolling platformer which also has some levels where you control The Polar Express train itself in 3D.

== Development ==
THQ unveiled the game at the E3 convention in 2004. The PlayStation 2 version contains EyeToy support. A portable version of the game was also in development for the Game Boy Advance, by developer Tantalus.

== Reception ==
Reception

Aggregate scores
Aggregator	Score			
Aggregator	GBA	GameCube	PC	PS2
GameRankings	48.2%	46.8%	71.5%	46.29%
Metacritic	N/A	40/100	N/A	39/100

Review scores
Publication	Score			
Publication	GBA	GameCube	PC	PS2
GameSpot	N/A	3.1/10	N/A	3.1/10
GameZone	4.5/10	7.2/10	6.3/10	N/A
IGN	N/A	3.5/10	N/A	3.5/10
Nintendo Power	3/5	2.9/5	N/A	N/A
Official U.S. PlayStation Magazine	N/A	N/A	N/A	3/5

The Polar Express received "generally unfavorable" reviews according to video game review aggregator Metacritic.

Reviewing the console versions of the game for GameSpot, Avery Score felt the experience was "a soulless video game cash-in on the movie" and that it would "leave even the youngest of tykes painfully aware that they've been cheated." IGN's Matt Casamassina was likewise very negative, finding every sort of gameplay featured was "flawed or underdeveloped" and criticizing its short length.

Dana Jongewaard, of Official U.S. PlayStation Magazine, was more positive about the game. While she conceded its short length and simplicity would make it a "questionable choice for anyone over 8," she thought that the game's target audience would enjoy it. She also complimented the bonus EyeToy content.

The Gameboy Advance version was also more positively received by Nintendo Power, who praised it for its graphics and gameplay, and recommended it for fans of the film. On the other hand, this version was more negatively reviewed by GameZone, who described it as "tired, worn out" and simply "no fun."
