= DT Racer =

2005 video game

- Developer: Axis Entertainment
- Publishers: KOR: Sony Computer Entertainment Korea; NA/EU: XS Games
- Platform: PlayStation 2
- Release: KOR: October 16, 2003; NA: September 27, 2005; EU: January 27, 2006
- Genre: Racing
- Modes: Single-player, multiplayer

DT Racer is a racing game developed by South Korean studio Axis Entertainment released exclusively for PlayStation 2 by XS Games in 2005.

== Gameplay ==
DT Racer presents a series of circuit races in which the player selects a car and competes against computer‑controlled opponents across multiple tracks. Each event involves managing speed through turns, navigating traffic, and maintaining position while following the course layout. Fuel functions as a resource that depletes during races, requiring the player to refill the tank between events through a manual meter. Vehicle damage is modeled, affecting the car when collisions occur. Outside of races, the player moves through menus to prepare the vehicle, adjust assists, and progress through the available courses.

== Reception ==
Reception

Review score
Publication	Score
Jeuxvideo	3/20

IGN gave DT Racer a 3.2 out of 10, with reviewer Chris Roper saying, "This game is pure crap, plain and simple."

The game sold 900,000 copies.
