= EyeToy: AntiGrav =

2004 video game

EyeToy: Antigrav
- Developer: Harmonix
- Publisher: Sony Computer Entertainment
- Designer: Dan Schmidt
- Series: EyeToy
- Platform: PlayStation 2
- Release: NA: November 9, 2004; PAL: March 24, 2005
- Genre: Racing
- Modes: Single-player, multiplayer

EyeToy: AntiGrav is a racing video game developed by Harmonix and published by Sony Computer Entertainment for the PlayStation 2. It is the first game developed by Harmonix to not be a music video game and was touted as the first "real" game for EyeToy targeted to more seasoned gamers. The player moves their body to guide the on-screen character riding a hoverboard through a track. Some obstacles require the player to crouch or jump. Up to 4 players are supported.

== Gameplay ==
Gameplay of EyeToy: AntiGrav's Speed mode

In EyeToy: AntiGrav the player controls a Hoverboard racer. There are two modes: Style and Speed. Speed mode is a standard race in which the player must reach the finish line and compete with other computer-controlled racers. In Style mode, the objective is to get the highest score possible by performing tricks, grinding on rails, and hitting targets by reaching over to them. There are a total of 5 tracks:

== Development and release ==
EyeToy: AntiGrav was developed by Harmonix. The game was inspired by modern snowboard and skateboard culture. One of the tasks that Harmonix focused on was how much physical effort was required to control the character. Harmonix decided to make the tricks use simple gestures that players can easily do. A high effort was put into the music and sound effects. Originally the game was designed to use the EyeToy accessory and gloves of bright green and orange to help the EyeToy read the motion of the player's hand, however, the gloves were no longer required for the final design.

The soundtrack was performed by Apollo 440. The audio changes according to what the player is doing in the game. For example, when a player is flying, the music will change to a slower, more relaxed version of the song. When the game was released in the U.S. in November 2004, it was bundled with the EyeToy. The PAL release in March 2005 was available as a standalone game as well as the aforementioned bundle.

== Reception ==
Reception

Aggregate score
Aggregator	Score
Metacritic	71/100

Review scores
Publication	Score
Edge	7/10
Electronic Gaming Monthly	7.17/10
Eurogamer	5/10
Game Informer	7/10
GameSpot	7.3/10
GameZone	7.8/10
IGN	7.4/10
Official U.S. PlayStation Magazine	4.5/5
PlayStation: The Official Magazine	7/10
X-Play	4/5
Detroit Free Press	2/4
The Times	4/5

The game received average reviews on the review aggregation website Metacritic. Prior to release, IGN awarded the game Most Innovative Design in their 2004 E3 press conference.

The New York Times gave it a favorable review, calling it "the closest thing yet to a game that allows the player to merge physically with the video console. At times the experience is uncanny". The Times also gave it four stars out of five, saying: "The potential is vast, and if this game does not quite make the most of it, it points the way". However, The Sydney Morning Herald gave it three-and-a-half stars out of five, saying that it "feels uncanny and exhilarating performing high-speed leaps". Detroit Free Press gave it two stars out of four, calling it "an intriguing look at the future, but it's not quite ready for today".

During the 8th Annual Interactive Achievement Awards, EyeToy: AntiGrav received nominations for "Console Family Game of the Year", "Outstanding Achievement in Gameplay Engineering" and "Outstanding Innovation in Console Gaming" by the Academy of Interactive Arts & Sciences.
