= Veris Ltd =

Veris
- Type: Limited company
- Traded as: ASX: VRS
- Industry: spatial data services
- Founded: 2008
- Headquarters: Australia
- Key people: Karl Paganin (Chairman); Michael Shirley (Managing Director and CEO); Steve Harding (Chief Financial Officer)
- Revenue: $106.8m (fiscal 2018)
- Website: veris.com.au

Veris (formerly OTOC) (ASX: VRS) is a spatial data services company in Australia.

== History ==
Ocean to Outback Electrical was formed in 2003 by Adam Lamond and Ocean to Outback Contracting (OTOC) was established in 2008. It renamed to Veris in November 2016.

== Projects ==
- Metro Tunnel Project
- WA Museum Boola Bardip
- Sunbury Line Upgrade
- Sydney Light Rail
- Epping Chatswood Rail Link
- Timbertop Estate
- Perth Airport
- Hydro Tasmania
- Launceston Model
- Australia 108
