= EyeToy: Play 2 =

2004 video game

- European PlayStation 2 boxart
- Developer: London Studio
- Publisher: Sony Computer Entertainment
- Composer: Richard Jacques
- Series: EyeToy
- Platform: PlayStation 2
- Release: EU: 5 November 2004; JP: 16 June 2005; NA: 16 August 2005
- Genre: Party
- Modes: Single-player, multiplayer

EyeToy: Play 2 is a minigame compilation video game developed by London Studio and published by Sony Computer Entertainment for the PlayStation 2. It is the sequel to EyeToy: Play. It uses EyeToy camera technology to project the player on to the television screen, allowing them to interact with on screen objects. The game contains twelve new minigames, that allow for single or multiplayer modes. The game also introduces a tournament mode, that allows several players to compete in a series of minigames, earning points for each game won.

The game also takes advantage of some EyeToy capabilities that the original did not, including being able to detect the speed and force of motion, and increased accuracy. This allows for more depth in games like Baseball, where points can be awarded for more forceful hitting of the ball. In addition, the game features SpyToy, enabling players to turn their EyeToy camera into a security system that will record anyone that passes by. It is possible to capture photos or record video, and record a message that will play on the television screen should anyone come within range. It also contains a demo of EyeToy: AntiGrav in which one races on a hover board.

The game was released in November 2004 in Europe, North America on 16 August 2005 as a bundled package with the EyeToy camera and in June 2005 in Japan.

== Games ==
EyeToy: Play 2 contains 87 games. There are 12 games and 75 bonus games. "Goal Attack" is a soccer game where the object is to defend the player team's goal while the opposing team attempts to hit the soccer ball into player team's goal. The player has to move constantly, defending the goal by moving different directions while the EyeToy captures movements and moves them accordingly. Another game is called "Table Tennis". The object of this game is to play Table Tennis against CPU controlled opponents while hitting the ball with player's hand. As the player beats the opponents, the opponents change and are slightly harder to defeat. The first opponent is named "Suzi Swift". If the players defeat her, they face "Max Armstrong", then comes "Dragon Pants Jim" and the last opponent "Master Pong". This game mainly focuses around minigames. There is also an EyeToy: AntiGrav demo included with the game.

== Reception ==
Reception

Aggregate score
| Aggregator | Score |
|---|---|
| Metacritic | 78/100 |

Review scores
| Publication | Score |
|---|---|
| 1Up.com | B+ |
| Edge | 8/10 |
| Electronic Gaming Monthly | 7.83/10 |
| Eurogamer | 8/10 |
| Game Informer | 8.5/10 |
| GameSpot | 7.8/10 |
| GameSpy | 3.5/5 |
| GameZone | 8/10 |
| IGN | 7.7/10 |
| Official U.S. PlayStation Magazine | 4.5/5 |
| Detroit Free Press | 3/4 |
| The Sydney Morning Herald | 4.5/5 |

The game received "favorable" reviews, albeit slightly less than the original EyeToy: Play, according to the review aggregation website Metacritic.

== See also ==
- EyeToy: Play
- EyeToy: Play 3
