= Get on da Mic =

2004 video game

- Developer: Artificial Mind and Movement / Highway 1 Productions
- Publisher: Eidos Interactive
- Platform: PlayStation 2
- Release: NA: October 5, 2004; EU: November 26, 2004; AU: December 10, 2004
- Genre: Music
- Modes: Single-player, multiplayer

Get on da Mic is a 2004 video game for the PlayStation 2 published by Eidos and co-developed by Canadian studio A2M and Highway 1 Productions. It focuses on hip hop songs.

The game is based on karaoke singing in which a singer sings a popular song while it plays with the vocals. The games are able to detect the pitch of the singer's voice and award points based on how well the singer matches the pitches they are supposed to be singing.

Get on da Mic requires the use of the same kinds of microphones also used with the Karaoke Revolution games. A hand-held karaoke microphone made by Logitech is available in a bundle with the game and is also sold separately; Logitech also sells a microphone headset.

== Reception ==
Reception

Aggregate score
Aggregator	Score
Metacritic	49/100

Review scores
Publication	Score
Game Informer	5/10
GameRevolution	D−
GamesMaster	65%
GameSpot	4.2/10
GameSpy	2.5/5
IGN	5.5/10
PlayStation Official Magazine – UK	5/10
Official U.S. PlayStation Magazine	2/5
PlayStation: The Official Magazine	7/10
X-Play	2/5
The Sydney Morning Herald	2.5/5

The game received "generally unfavorable reviews" according to the review aggregation website Metacritic.

== See also ==
- Karaoke Revolution
- SingStar
- Def Jam Rapstar
