= This Is Football 2005 =

2004 video game

- Developer: London Studio
- Publisher: Sony Computer Entertainment
- Series: This Is Football
- Platform: PlayStation 2
- Release: EU: 1 October 2004; NA: 22 March 2005
- Genre: Sports
- Modes: Single-player, multiplayer

This Is Football 2005, known as World Tour Soccer 2006 in North America, is a sports video game developed by London Studio and published by Sony Computer Entertainment for the PlayStation 2.

In-game match commentary is provided by Peter Drury and Chris Kamara. As evidenced in the game's instruction manual, Drury worked at ITV Sport and Kamara worked at Sky Sports respectively at the time of the game's release.

== Reception ==
Reception

Aggregate score
Aggregator	Score
Metacritic	56/100

Review scores
Publication	Score
4Players	5.5/10
GameZone	7.3/10

This is Football 2005 received "mixed or average" reviews, according to review aggregator Metacritic.
