= EyeToy: Kinetic =

2005 video game

- PAL game cover
- Developer: London Studio
- Publisher: Sony Computer Entertainment
- Series: EyeToy
- Platform: PlayStation 2
- Release: EU: September 23, 2005; AU: September 29, 2005; NA: November 22, 2005
- Genre: Exergaming
- Mode: Single player

EyeToy: Kinetic is a 2005 exercising video game developed by London Studio and published by Sony Computer Entertainment for the PlayStation 2. It was developed alongside Nike Motionworks, a division of Nike, Inc.

The game is a collection of exercising minigames. It includes a wide angle "Full Vision Lens" attachment that fits over the EyeToy lens. Without it, the player's image on the screen is too large to play this game properly. It is held in a foam insert in the standard memory card holder in the disc case.

A sequel named EyeToy: Kinetic Combat was released in 2006.

== Games ==
EyeToy: Kinetic is separated into four different sections, containing exercise games under the certain groups:

=== Cardio Zone ===
The 'Cardio Zone' contains games designed to improve cardiovascular fitness. These are:

- Cascade: Touching the blue orbs, but avoiding the red ones.
- Pulsate: Touching the blue discs before they change position.
- Ricochet: Touching the blue targets while avoiding the orbs bouncing around the screen.
- Arcburst: Moving the hands over the blue trails before they change.

=== Combat Zone ===
The 'Combat Zone' is designed to improve speed, physical strength and flexibility. These are:

- Wildfire: Destroying the orbs that appear on screen.
- Backlash: Destroying the incoming pads before they touch the circle in the centre of the screen.
- Trespass: Destroying the yellow orbs before they reach the vent and go off screen.
- Breakspeed: Destroying the walls on either side of the player.
- Reflex: Destroying the walls by hitting the yellow orbs into them.
- Protector: Destroying the incoming projectiles to protect the orb.
- Sidewinder: Protecting the target from orbs and projectiles.

=== Toning Zone ===
The 'Toning Zone' contains games designed for body conditioning and exercise. These are:

- Abdominal Exercises: Increase strength and toning of abdominal muscles and the lower back.
- Upper Body Exercises: Increase strength of the upper body muscles.
- Lower Body Exercises: Increase strength of the lower body muscles.

=== Mind and Body Zone ===
The 'Mind and Body Zone' is designed to improve breathing, posture and relaxation. These are:

- Equilibrium: Break the beams of light to increase the score.
- Reactivate: Copy the sequence before the next one appears.
- Energyflow: Move the disc over the target as moves along the trail.
- Outbreak: Capture the green orbs in a net before it vanishes.

The zone also contains three sequences besides the games above:

- Yoga
- Tai Chi
- Meditation
- Musics

=== Personal Trainer Mode ===
The game offers a personal trainer mode: a 12-week programme of various games from the four zones. Before the players begin, they are able to choose a trainer, Matt or Anna, who will guide them through the twelve-week workout. They will choose certain games from the four zones which the players change if they don't like them. The players have the option to perform a warm up and stretching sequence along with the routine.

At the end of every routine and every week, they are graded depending on own performance. These grades go from A+ (Master) to E (Beginner). If they miss five days of the workout, they will be asked if the players wish to do the entire twelve-week workout from the beginning.

== Reception ==
Reception

Aggregate score
Aggregator	Score
Metacritic	78/100

Review scores
Publication	Score
Eurogamer	8/10
Game Informer	8/10
GameRevolution	C+
GameSpot	7.5/10
GameSpy	3/5
GameZone	8.5/10
IGN	8/10
Official U.S. PlayStation Magazine	4/5
PlayStation: The Official Magazine	6.5/10
X-Play	3/5
Detroit Free Press	3/4
The Times	5/5

The game received "generally favorable reviews" according to the review aggregation website Metacritic.

The Times gave it a score of all five stars, stating: "Each activity comes with a tutorial from a virtual instructor, and as you kick out at the falling balloons on the TV screen it's impossible not to smile. And how often do you see that down [at] the gym?" CiN Weekly gave it a score of 85 out of 100 and called it "a decent workout routine generator with fun games that will keep you interested and sweaty". Detroit Free Press gave it a score of three stars out of four: "Unlike other fitness games, EyeToy: Kinetic really sucks you in because you get immediate personal feedback. That's a real technological advancement -- something that might even make you want to jump up off that couch".
