= PlayStation 3 models =

The PlayStation 3 (PS3) video game console has been produced in various models during its life cycle. At launch, the PlayStation 3 was available with either a 20 or 60 GB hard disk drive in the US and Japan, respectively— priced from US$499 to US$599; and with either a 40, 60, or 80 GB hard disk drive in Europe, priced from £299 to £425. Since then, Sony has released two further redesigned models, the "Slim" and "Super Slim" models. As of March 2017, the total number of consoles sold is estimated at 87.4 million.

== Original model ==
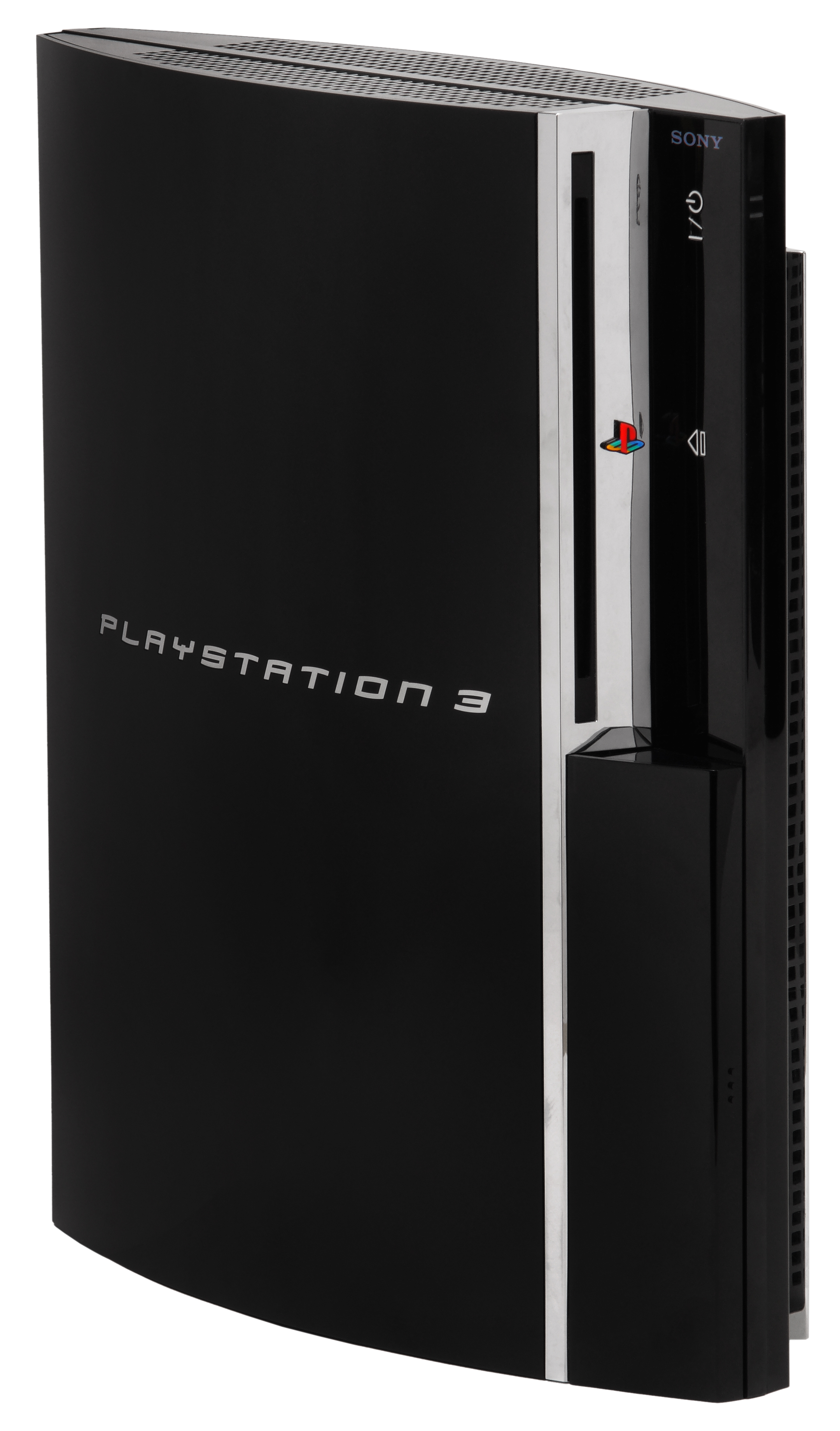
Launch PlayStation 3

There are several original PlayStation 3 hardware models, which are commonly referred to by the size of their included hard disk drive: 20, 40, 60, 80, or 160 GB. Although referred to by their HDD size, the capabilities of the consoles vary by region and release date. The only difference in the appearance of the first five models was the color of the trim, number of USB ports, the presence or absence of a door (which covers the flash card readers on equipped models) and some minor changes to the air vents. All retail packages include one or two Sixaxis controllers or a DualShock 3 controller (beginning June 12, 2008), one Type-A to Mini-B USB cable (for connecting the controller and PlayStation Portable to the system), one composite video/stereo audio output cable, one Ethernet cable (20, 60 and CECHExx 80 GB only) and one power cable. The original and CECHExx models were also the only video game consoles ever made to feature a Super Audio CD player.

All models support software emulation of the original PlayStation, but support for PlayStation 2 backward compatibility diminished with later compatible models and the last model to have integrated backward compatibility was the NTSC 80 GB (CECHE) Metal Gear Solid 4 Bundle. Compatibility issues with games for both systems are detailed in a public database hosted by the manufacturer. All models, excluding the 20 GB model, include 802.11 b/g Wi-Fi.

In addition to all of the features of the 20 GB model, the 60 GB model has internal IEEE 802.11 b/g Wi-Fi, multiple flash card readers (SD/MultiMedia Card, CompactFlash Type I/Type II, Microdrive, Memory Stick PRO Duo) and a chrome colored trim. In terms of hardware, the 80 GB model CECHE released in South Korea is identical to the 60 GB model CECHC released in the PAL regions, except for the difference in hard drive size. The European 60GB model (CECHC), the South Korean and North American CECHE 80GB model excludes the PlayStation 2 "Emotion Engine" CPU chip with it being replaced by an emulated version via the Cell Broadband Engine. However, it retains the "Graphics Synthesizer" GPU resulting in a hybrid hardware and software emulation. Due to the elimination of the "Emotion Engine" and its replacement with a software-emulated version, the level of PlayStation 2 compatibility was slightly reduced. The 40 GB (CECHJ, CECHH, CECHG), later 80 GB (CECHL, CECHM, and CECHK) and 160 GB (CECHP, CECHQ) models have two USB ports instead of the four USB ports on other models and do not include multiple flash card readers, SACD support, or backward compatibility with PlayStation 2 games. This was due to the removal of "Graphics Synthesizer" GPU, which stripped the units of all PlayStation 2 based hardware. These consoles also changed from the initial chrome trim disc drive covers into a matte silver with the Playstation 3 lettering on the top also changing to a matte silver from chrome.

No official Wi-Fi or flash memory card readers were ever released by Sony for the 20 GB system, although Sony had plans to do so. As of September 2009, Sony had placed no further emphasis on these proposed add-ons. Nevertheless, as the model features four USB 2.0 ports, wireless networking and flash memory card support can already be obtained through the use of widely available external USB adapters and third-party PS3-specific media hubs.

It was rumored that the Cell processors in the third-generation PS3s (40 GB, 2008 80 GB (CECHL, CECHM, CECHK) and 160 GB) would move from a 90 nm fabrication process to the newer 65 nm fabrication process, which SCEI CEO Kaz Hirai later confirmed. This change lowers the power consumption of the console and makes it less expensive to produce.

== Slim model ==
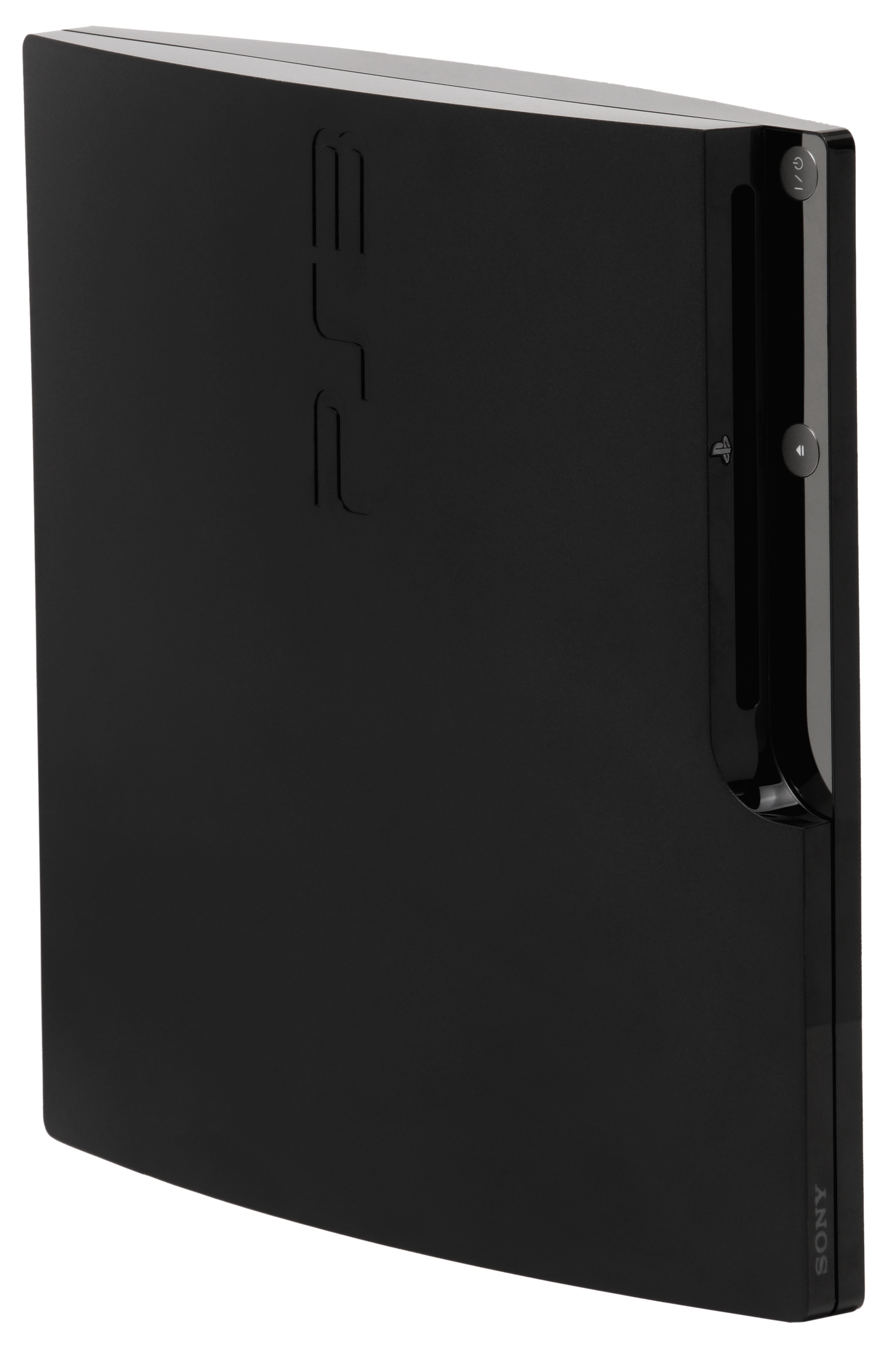
A 120 GB Slim model

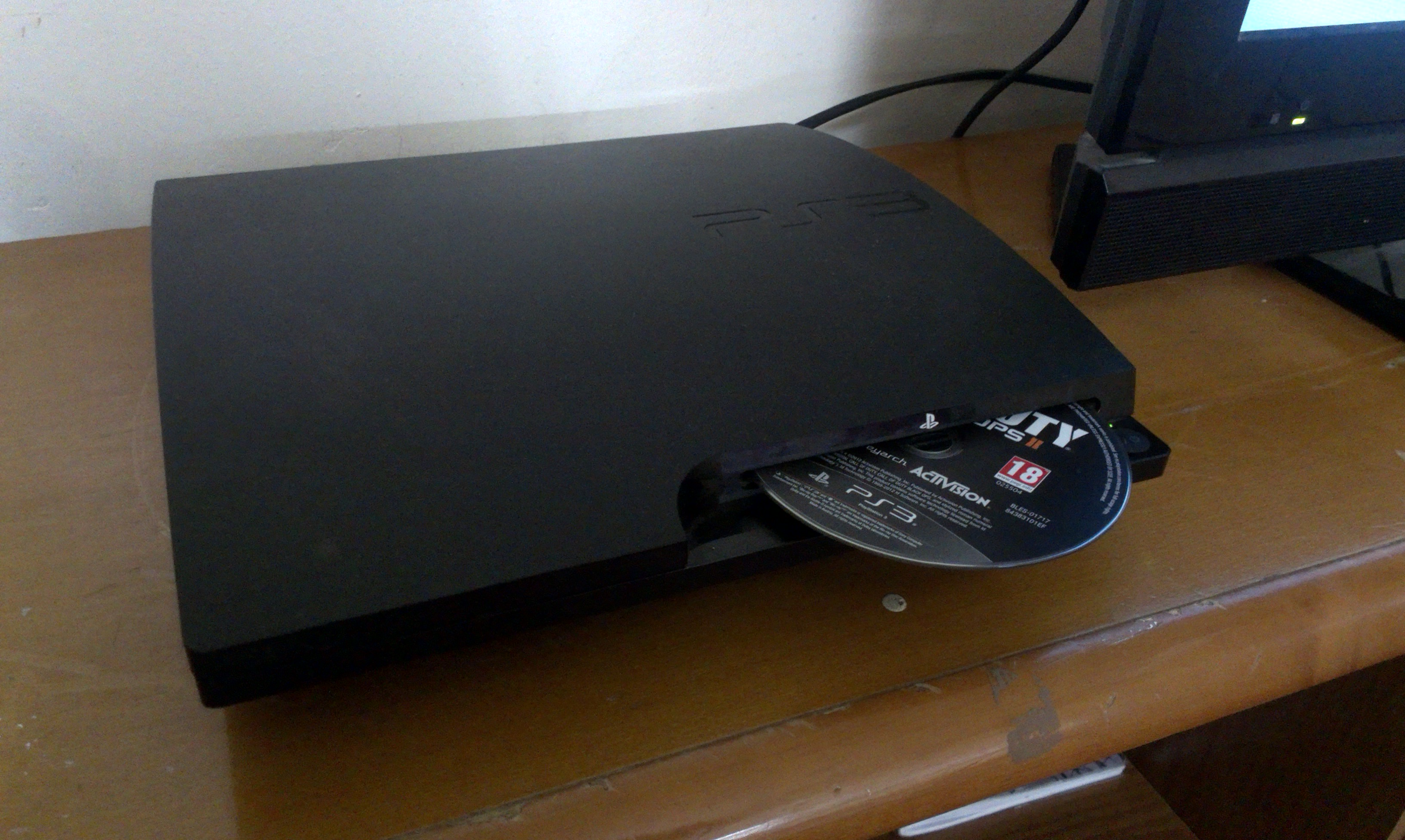
Motorized slot-loading disc cover. This feature is absent in the Super Slim model.

The redesigned version of the PlayStation 3 (commonly referred to as the "PS3 Slim" and officially branded "PS3") features an upgradeable 120 GB, 160 GB, 250 GB or 320 GB hard drive and is 33% smaller, 36% lighter and consumes 34% (CECH-20xx) or 45% (CECH-21xx) less power than the previous model, or one third of the original PS3 model. The Cell microprocessor moved to a 45 nm manufacturing process, which lets it run cooler and quieter than previous models, and the cooling system has been redesigned. The RSX moved to a 40 nm process after the first revision. The PS3 slim also includes support for CEC (more commonly referred to by its manufacturer brandings of BraviaSync, VIERA Link, EasyLink etc.) which allows control of the console over HDMI by using the TV's remote control. The PS3 Slim no longer has the "main power" switch like the previous PS3 models, similar to redesigned slimline PlayStation 2. Support for emulation to play PS2 titles is not present in the Slim version, however, shortly after the release of the PS3 Slim, Sony announced a new series of PS2 remasters called Classics HD as in PS2 and PSP titles remastered in HD for the PS3 with Trophies and sometimes PlayStation Move compatibility added. As of October 2011, PS2 classics are available for purchase in the PlayStation Store.

The PS3 Slim was officially released on September 1, 2009, in North America and Europe and on September 3, 2009, in Japan, Australia and New Zealand. However, some retailers such as Amazon.com, Best Buy and GameStop started to sell the PS3 slim on August 25, 2009. The PS3 Slim sold in excess of a million units in its first 3 weeks on sale. A 250 GB Final Fantasy XIII-themed PS3 Slim, which was white in color with pink designs, was officially announced on September 24, 2009, at the Tokyo Game Show as part of a bundle in Japan for Final Fantasy XIII, it was initially revealed in U.S. Federal Communications Commission (FCC) filings as the PS3 CECH-2000B. Sony Computer Entertainment Australia also announced later that day that it would be bringing the 250 GB PS3 slim to Australia which would be bundled with other games and will not feature the Final Fantasy XIII theme. Although no North American bundles have been announced for the 250 GB PS3 slim, it was sold as a stand-alone console in North America.

In July 2010, Sony announced two new sizes of the Slim PS3, 160 GB and 320 GB, with the 120 GB model being discontinued in Japan. These were launched on July 29, 2010, in Japan, with the 160 GB version available in "Classic White" as well as the standard "Charcoal Black". The black 160 GB version was also made available as a bundle with the Japan-only DVR accessory torne. It was later announced that the new sizes were to be launched in other regions, with the 160 GB model available from August 2010 in North America and October 2010 in Europe. The 320 GB model is to be available in North America only as part of a bundle with PlayStation Move, a PlayStation Eye and a copy of Sports Champions, and in Europe with PlayStation Move, a PlayStation Eye and a demo disc. The bundles were released on September 19, 2010, and September 15, 2010, respectively, to coincide with the launch of PlayStation Move.

== Super Slim model ==
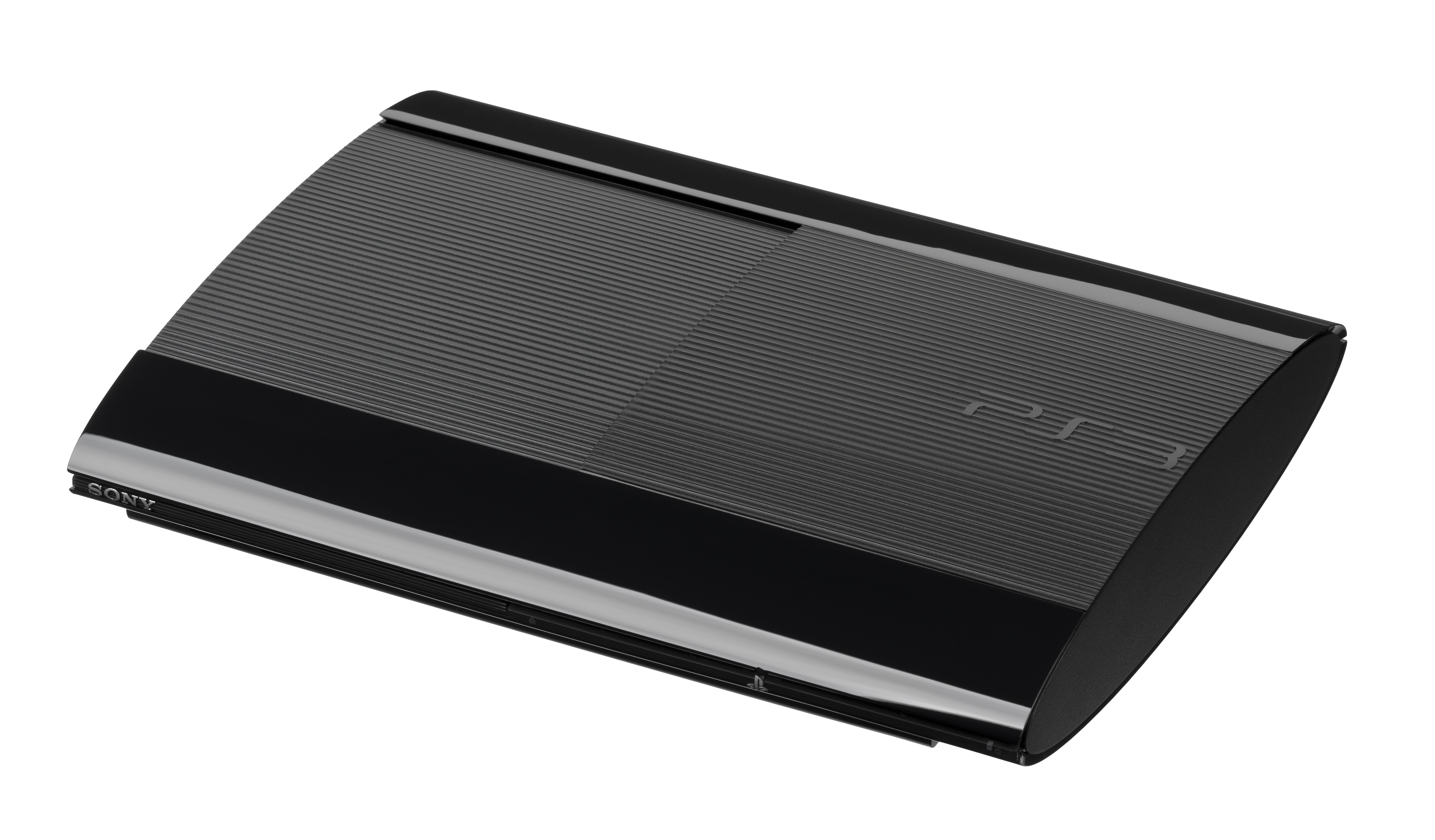
A Super Slim PS3

In September 2012, Sony announced that a new slimmer PS3 redesign (CECH-4000) was due to be released in late 2012 and that it would be available with either a 250 GB or 500 GB hard drive.

In PAL regions, the 250 GB model is not available; a model with 12 GB of flash memory (CECH-4000A) is available in its place. A standalone 250 GB hard drive (CECH-ZHD1) is available to upgrade this model. In the UK, the 500 GB model was released on September 28, 2012, while the 12 GB model was made available on October 12, 2012.

CECH-4000B consoles (those with hard drives) weigh approximately 2.1 kg (4.6 lb), while the CECH-4000A weighs approximately 2.0 kg (4.4 lb). Both are roughly 25% smaller and about 20% lighter than the original PS3 Slim. This version has a sliding disc cover rather than the slot-loading drive found on the previous PlayStation 3 consoles.

A CECH-4200 model with nearly identical hardware to that of the CECH-4000 model was introduced in 2013 to follow the AACS rule of inhibiting analog (component and composite) output of Blu-ray disc content effective since 2014. While in previous 3000 and 4000 models the output limit was already set at 480i to meet a January 1, 2011, deadline in agreement also with the aforementioned AACS.

A vertical stand (CECH-ZST1J) is also available for these models and was launched on the same day as the consoles in their respective regions.

== Model comparison ==
Model	Features		Available colors	First available	Available bundles
20 GB; CECHBxx; NTSC	4 USB 2.0 ports; Hardware-based PS2 Backward Compatibility; SACD playback; Linux support^{[a]}; Sixaxis controller; Backwards compatible with PlayStation and Playstation 2 games	—N/a	Piano Black, Black trim	JP NA: November 2006	Everybody's Golf 5 (Japan)
60 GB; CECHAxx; NTSC	4 USB 2.0 ports; Hardware-based PS2 Backward Compatibility; SACD playback; Linux support^{[a]}; Sixaxis controller; Backwards compatible with PlayStation and Playstation 2 games	Flash memory card readers; 802.11b/g Wi-Fi	Piano Black, Chrome trim	JP NA: November 2006	60 GB bundles: Dynasty Warriors: Gundam (Japan); Bladestorm: The Hundred Years' War (Japan)
60 GB; CECHCxx; PAL	802.11b/g Wi-Fi; Flash memory card readers; 4 USB 2.0 ports; Partially software-based PS2 emulation; SACD playback; Linux support^{[a]}; Sixaxis controller; Backwards compatible with Playstation and Playstation 2 games; (MGS4 bundles sold with DualShock 3 controller)		Piano Black, Chrome trim	UK ROI EU AUS: 23 March 2007	60 GB bundles: MotorStorm, Resistance: Fall of Man and an extra Sixaxis gamepad (UK)(Europe); Heavenly Sword and Formula One Championship Edition and an extra Sixaxis gamepad (France)
80 GB; CECHExx; NTSC	802.11b/g Wi-Fi; Flash memory card readers; 4 USB 2.0 ports; Partially software-based PS2 emulation; SACD playback; Linux support^{[a]}; Sixaxis controller; Backwards compatible with Playstation and Playstation 2 games; (MGS4 bundles sold with DualShock 3 controller)		Piano Black, Chrome trim	NA: August 2007	80 GB bundles: MGS4 (North America); MotorStorm; Formula One Championship Edition
40 GB; CECHGxx; CECHHxx; CECHJxx; PAL, NTSC	802.11b/g Wi-Fi; 2 USB 2.0 ports; Linux support^{[a]}; Backwards compatible with PlayStation games	Sixaxis controller; (MGS4 bundles sold with DualShock 3 controller)	Piano Black; Ceramic White^{[b]}; Satin Silver^{[c]}; (All with Satin Silver trim): Gun-Metal Grey, Gun-Metal Grey trim^{[d]}	EU AUS: October 2007; NA JP: November 2007	40 GB bundles: MGS4 (Gun-metal grey console)^{[d]}; Spider-Man 3 Blu-ray (North America); Transformers: The Game, Spider-Man3 Blu-ray, Blu-Ray remote control, 6ft HDMI cable, and 12-week Blockbuster rental card (US; Blockbuster exclusive); Ryū ga Gotoku Kenzan! (Japan; "satin silver" console); Uncharted: Drake's Fortune, Need for Speed: ProStreet, and extra Sixaxis controller (France); Ratchet & Clank: Tools of Destruction, Uncharted: Drake's Fortune, and extra Sixaxis controller (Europe); Spider-Man 3 Blu-ray, 300 Blu-ray and Casino Royale Blu-ray (Europe); Gran Turismo 5 Prologue (Europe); GTA IV (Europe)
80 GB; CECHKxx; CECHLxx; CECHMxx; PAL, NTSC	802.11b/g Wi-Fi; 2 USB 2.0 ports; Linux support^{[a]}; Backwards compatible with PlayStation games	DualShock 3 controller	Piano Black; Ceramic White; Satin Silver^{[c]}; (All with Satin Silver trim)	NA EU AUS: August 2008; JP: October 2008	80 GB bundles: MGS4 and Killzone 2 Greatest Hits (US; Best Buy exclusive); LittleBigPlanet (UK) (Europe) (Japan); MLB 09: The Show and Quantum of Solace Blu-ray (US); MotorStorm and Resistance: Fall of Man (US; Target exclusive); LittleBigPlanet and Wall-E Blu-ray (US; Best Buy exclusive); Ratchet & Clank Future: Quest for Booty and extra DualShock 3 controller (Europe); inFamous (UK)(Europe); Killzone 2 (Australia) (UK); Pro Evolution Soccer 2009 and extra DualShock 3 controller (Japan); LittleBigPlanet and extra DualShock 3 controller (Japan; "satin silver" console); Gran Turismo 5 Prologue (Japan); Gran Turismo 5 Prologue and extra DualShock 3 controller (Europe); Resident Evil 5 and extra DualShock 3 controller (Japan; piano black console with custom matte-finish Tricell logo); Yakuza 3 ("ceramic white" console featuring custom dragon designs)^{[e]} (Japan); MotorStorm: Pacific Rift (UK); Gran Turismo 5 Prologue and Midnight Club: Los Angeles (UK); Various Blu-ray movie bundles: Batman Begins(UK); I Am Legend (UK); Terminator 3 and Terminator Salvation (game) (UK); 300 (UK); Bienvenue chez les Ch'tis (Europe)
160 GB; CECHPxx; CECHQxx; PAL, NTSC	802.11b/g Wi-Fi; 2 USB 2.0 ports; Linux support^{[a]}; Backwards compatible with PlayStation games	DualShock 3 controller	Piano Black; Cloud Black^{[f]}; (All with Satin Silver trim)	EU: October 2008; NA: November 2008	160 GB bundles: Gran Turismo 5 Prologue, Ratchet & Clank Future: Quest for Booty, The Last Guy & Super Stardust HD (Europe); Uncharted: Drake's Fortune (NTSC region); Final Fantasy VII: Advent Children Blu-ray (Japan; "cloud black" console with custom design)^{[f]}
120 GB slim CECH-20xxA; CECH-21xxA; PAL, NTSC	802.11b/g Wi-Fi; 2 USB 2.0 ports; BRAVIA Sync XMB control (CEC); Slimmer form factor; Dolby TrueHD and DTS-HD Master Audio bitstreaming; DualShock 3 controller; Backwards compatible with PlayStation games		Charcoal Black	NA EU: September 1, 2009; AUS JP: September 3, 2009	120 GB slim bundles: InFamous and Killzone 2 (US; Amazon.com exclusive); LittleBigPlanet Game of the Year Edition and Ratchet & Clank Future: A Crack in Time (US; Best Buy exclusive); LittleBigPlanet Game of the Year Edition and God of War Collection (US; Gamestop exclusive); Uncharted: Drake's Fortune and InFamous (US; Sony Store exclusive); InFamous, Batman Arkham Asylum and The Dark Knight Blu-ray (US; Walmart exclusive); Mobile Suit GUNDAM Battlefield record U.C.0081 (Japan); Pro Evolution Soccer 2010 (Japan); This Is It Blu-ray (Japan)
250 GB slim CECH-20xxB; CECH-21xxB; PAL, NTSC	802.11b/g Wi-Fi; 2 USB 2.0 ports; BRAVIA Sync XMB control (CEC); Slimmer form factor; Dolby TrueHD and DTS-HD Master Audio bitstreaming; DualShock 3 controller; Backwards compatible with PlayStation games		Charcoal Black; White and Pink^{[g]}	EU: October 2009; AU: October 15, 2009; NA: November 3, 2009; JP: December 17, 2009	250 GB slim bundles: Final Fantasy XIII (Japan; white and pink console)^{[g]}; torne (Japan); Resistance: Fall Of Man and Resistance 2 (Middle-East); Uncharted 2 (Australia) (UK) (US); PlayTV (Australia); Tekken 6 (Europe, except for UK); Heavy Rain (France); Need for Speed: Shift (Europe); FIFA 10 (Europe); InFamous 2 (UK); X-Men Origins: Wolverine, The Dark Knight Blu-ray movies and Blu-Ray remote control (UK); Assassin's Creed II (UK); God of War III (India) (France); LittleBigPlanet and HDMI cable (North America; Amazon.com exclusive); 2010 FIFA World Cup South Africa (Australia); ModNation Racers (Europe)
160 GB slim CECH-25xxA; CECH-30xxA; PAL, NTSC	802.11b/g Wi-Fi; 2 USB 2.0 ports; BRAVIA Sync XMB control (CEC); Slimmer form factor; Dolby TrueHD and DTS-HD Master Audio bitstreaming; DualShock 3 controller; Backwards compatible with PlayStation games		Charcoal Black; Classic White; Satin Silver; Titanium Blue^{[h]}; Magical Gold^{[i]}	JP: July 29, 2010; NA: August 2010; EU: October 2010	160 GB slim bundles: Torne (Japan); Gran Turismo 5 (Japan; "titanium blue" console); inFamous (greatest hits) and NHL 11 (Canada); Uncharted 2: Among Thieves, PixelJunk Shooter and The Karate Kid Blu-ray (US; Amazon.com exclusive); ModNation Racers, LittleBigPlanet (game of the year edition) and Cars Blu-ray (US; Best Buy exclusive); God of War III, God of War: Collection and a Blu-Ray remote control (US; GameStop exclusive); Star Wars: The Force Unleashed 2 and Prince of Persia Blu-ray (US; Target exclusive); Uncharted 2: Among Thieves and Medal of Honor (US; Walmart exclusive); ModNation Racers, How to Train Your Dragon Blu-ray, a Blu-ray remote control and an extra DualShock 3 controller (US; Sam's Club exclusive); Killzone 3 (US); Gran Turismo 5, Grown Ups Blu-ray, and select Sony Bravia TV (US; Best Buy exclusive); Harry Potter and the Deathly Hallows – Part 2 Blu-ray and 30-day PlayStation Plus trial membership (US); Call of Duty: Black Ops (US); Call of Duty: Black Ops and Call of Duty: Modern Warfare 3 (Latin America); SingStar Dance, 2 SingStar microphones and Ratchet & Clank Future: A Crack in Time (US; Amazon.com exclusive); LittleBigPlanet 2, Ratchet & Clank: All 4 One and 30-day PlayStation Plus trial membership (North America); Gran Turismo 5 XL, The Sly Collection and 30-day PlayStation Plus trial membership (US; GameStop exclusive); Pro Evolution Soccer 2011 (Latin America, "satin silver" console); Pro Evolution Soccer 2012 (Asia) (Latin America, "metallic blue" or "charcoal black" console); PlayStation Move, PlayStation Eye and Sports Champions (Japan); MGS4, Castlevania: Lords of Shadow, and 20,000 reward points for Metal Gear Online (Japan); Ni no Kuni (Japan; "magical gold console"); Tales of Xillia (Japan; charcoal black console with custom red and gold design); Uncharted 3: Drake’s Deception
320 GB slim CECH-25xxB; CECH-30xxB; PAL, NTSC	802.11b/g Wi-Fi; 2 USB 2.0 ports; BRAVIA Sync XMB control (CEC); Slimmer form factor; Dolby TrueHD and DTS-HD Master Audio bitstreaming; DualShock 3 controller; Backwards compatible with PlayStation games		Charcoal Black; Classic White; Splash Blue and Scarlet Red; Satin Silver; Black and Pink^{[j]}; Gold^{[k]}	JP: July 29, 2010; NA: September 19, 2010; EU: September 15, 2010	320 GB slim bundles: PlayStation Move, PlayStation Eye and Sports Champions bundle (North-America); Uncharted 3: Drake’s Deception and 30-day PlayStation Plus trial membership (North America); PlayStation Move, PlayStation Eye and demo disc bundle (Europe); Gran Turismo 5 (Europe); torne (Japan; "charcoal black" or "classic white" console); Final Fantasy XIII-2 (Japan; black and pink console); One Piece: Pirate Warriors (Japan; gold console)^{[k]}; Pro Evolution Soccer 2012 (Asia); Infamous 2 and 30-day PlayStation Plus trial membership (North America); Battlefield 3, FIFA 12, Uncharted 3: Drake's Deception, Gran Turismo 5 and Karate Kid Blu-ray (UK); FIFA 12 (UK); Infamous 2 (UK); Little Big Planet 2 (UK); Resistance 3 and Battle: Los Angeles Blu-ray (UK); Uncharted 3: Drake’s Deception and Faster Blu-ray (UK); Virtua Tennis 4 (UK); NHL 13 (Canada); Everybody Dance, PlayStation Eye and PlayStation Move (US); Call of Duty: Modern Warfare 3 (US)
12 GB super slim CECH-40xxA; CECH-42xxA; CECH-43xxA; PAL NTSC	802.11b/g Wi-Fi; 2 USB 2.0 ports; BRAVIA Sync XMB control (CEC); Super slim form factor; Dolby TrueHD and DTS-HD Master Audio bitstreaming; DualShock 3 controller; Backwards compatible with PlayStation games		Charcoal Black; Azurite Blue; Garnet Red	EU: October 12, 2012; NA: August 18, 2013	12 GB super slim bundles: * Disney Infinity: Marvel Super Heroes (US); 2014 FIFA World Cup Brazil (UK); Skylanders: Giants (Europe); Wonderbook: Book of Spells, PlayStation Move, PlayStation Eye (Europe); Move Street Cricket II (India) - with Move controller
250 GB super slim CECH-40xxB; CECH-42xxB; NTSC	802.11b/g Wi-Fi; 2 USB 2.0 ports; BRAVIA Sync XMB control (CEC); Super slim form factor; Dolby TrueHD and DTS-HD Master Audio bitstreaming; DualShock 3 controller; Backwards compatible with PlayStation games		Charcoal Black; Azurite Blue (Canada, Japan & United States only); Black and Gold ^{[l]}; Black and White ^{[m]}; Black and Blue ^{[n]}; Classic White (Japan)	JP: October 4, 2012; NA: September 25, 2012	250 GB super slim bundles: Uncharted 3: Drake's Deception game of the year edition and 1-year PlayStation Plus trial membership (US); Uncharted 3: Drake's Deception game of the year edition, Dust 514 and 30-day PlayStation Plus trial membership (US); Uncharted: Drake's Fortune, Uncharted 2: Among Thieves, inFamous Collection and 30-day PlayStation Plus trial membership (North America); Burnout Paradise, Need for Speed: Most Wanted and 30-day PlayStation Plus trial membership (US; Toys R Us exclusive); PlayStation All-Stars Battle Royale, "Ratchet & Clank Collection", Blu-ray/Media remote and $20 credit for Amazon Video (US; Amazon.com exclusive); The Last of Us and Batman: Arkham Origins (US); The Last of Us (North America); LittleBigPlanet Karting, PlayStation Move, Playstation Move Racing Wheel, PlayStation Eye, and 30-day PlayStation Plus trial membership (US; Walmart exclusive); Lego Harry Potter: Years 5–7, Lego Batman 2: DC Super Heroes, and LittleBigPlanet Karting (US; Gamestop exclusive); Epic Mickey 2: The Power of Two, Playstation Move, PlayStation Eye and 30-day PlayStation Plus trial membership (US; Target exclusive) (Canada; Walmart exclusive); Medal of Honor: Warfighter, God of War Saga and 30-day PlayStation Plus trial membership (US; Best Buy exclusive) (Canada; Best Buy/Future Shop exclusive); PlayStation Move, PlayStation Eye, Eyepet and Sports Champions (US; Amazon.com exclusive); Everybody's Golf 6 (Japan; "charcoal black" or "classic white" console); Metal Gear Rising: Revengeance (Japan; black and blue console)(Latin America); Puppeteer (Japan); Yakuza 5, 8GB USB thumbdrive, and beach towel (Japan; black and gold console); Fist of the North Star: Ken's Rage 2 (Japan; black and white console); torne (Japan); Gran Turismo 6 (Japan; "charcoal black" or "classic white" console); FIFA 13 (Latin America); NHL 14 (Canada; EB Games exclusive; "azurite blue" console); Gran Turismo 6 (Latin America, "azurite blue" console); Grand Theft Auto V (Latin America); Pro Evolution Soccer 2014 and an extra DualShock 3 controller (Latin America); God of War: Ascension, God of War: Origins Collection, God of War Collection, and God of War III (Latin America, "classic white" console)
500 GB super slim CECH-40xxC; CECH-42xxC; CECH-43xxC; PAL, NTSC	802.11b/g Wi-Fi; 2 USB 2.0 ports; BRAVIA Sync XMB control (CEC); Super slim form factor; Dolby TrueHD and DTS-HD Master Audio bitstreaming; DualShock 3 controller; Backwards compatible with PlayStation games		Charcoal Black; Classic White (Japan, Europe, North America); Garnet Red; Azurite Blue (Europe Only)	JP: October 4, 2012; NA: October 30, 2012; EU: September 28, 2012; AU: September 27, 2012	500 GB super slim bundles: Assassin's Creed III (US); FIFA 13 (Europe); Beyond Two Souls (France); God of War: Ascension (Europe); God of War: Ascension and God of War Saga (US; "garnet red" console); Grand Theft Auto V; Gran Turismo 5 XL Edition, Infamous 2 and 30-day PlayStation Plus trial membership (North America); Gran Turismo 5 Academy Edition and Uncharted 3 Game of The Year Edition (Europe); The Last of Us (US) (Canada); 1 year PlayStation Plus membership (North America, "classic white" console); Destiny (North America); Lego The Hobbit (US) (Canada); Lego Batman 3: Beyond Gotham and The Sly Collection (US); FIFA 15 and an extra DualShock 3 controller (Mexico); NHL 15, Uncharted: Drake's Fortune and Uncharted 2: Among Thieves (Canada); The Amazing Spider-Man 2 and The Amazing Spider-Man on VUDU (US); Watch Dogs (Europe)

Key: 1st Generation 2nd Generation 3rd Generation 4th Generation 5th Generation

All Piano Black and Ceramic White models have a glossy finish
All models include: Blu-ray/DVD/CD drive, HDMI 1.3a (upgraded to HDMI 1.4 via firmware update), Bluetooth 2.0, Gigabit Ethernet (10BASE-T, 100BASE-TX, 1000BASE-T) and PlayStation backward compatibility through software emulation.
Model numbers differ by region. See PlayStation 3 hardware – model numbers for details.

a Linux support removed in firmware version 3.21. See OtherOS for details
b Ceramic white model available in Asia and Japan only.
c Satin silver model available in Asia and Japan only.
d Gun-Metal Gray model is only available as part of the MGS4 bundle.
e Yakuza 3 bundle features a Ceramic White model with custom grey dragon designs on its case. This version had a limited run of 10,000 units.
f "Cloud Black" (dark grey) console is only available as part of a Japanese limited edition Final Fantasy VII: Advent Children bundle and features a custom white design on the console
g White and Pink model is only available as part of the Japanese Final Fantasy XIII bundle and features a pink design of Final Fantasy XIII character "Lightning" on its case.
h Titanium Blue model is only available as part of the Japanese Gran Turismo 5 Titanium Blue bundle
i Magical Gold model is only available as part of the Japanese Ni no Kuni bundle
j Black and Pink model is only available as part of the Japanese Final Fantasy XIII-2 bundle and features a pink design of Final Fantasy XIII character "Lightning" on its case.
k Gold model is only available as part of the Japanese One Piece: Pirate Warriors Gold bundle
l Black and Gold model is only available as part of the Japanese Yakuza 5 bundle and features a gold emblem design on its case.
m Black and White model is only available as part of the Japanese Fist of the North Star: Ken's Rage 2 bundle and features a white emblem design on its case
n Black and Blue model is only available as part of the Japanese Metal Gear Rising: Revengeance bundle

== See also ==
- PlayStation models
- PlayStation 2 models
- PlayStation 4
- PlayStation 5
