= 6th British Academy Games Awards =

Game award ceremony in 2010

- Date: 19 March 2010
- Location: London Hilton
- Hosted by: Dara Ó Briain
- Best Game: Batman: Arkham Asylum
- Most awards: Uncharted 2: Among Thieves (4)
- Most nominations: Uncharted 2: Among Thieves (10)

The 6th British Academy Video Game Awards (known for the purposes of sponsorship as GAME British Academy Video Games Awards) awarded by British Academy of Film and Television Arts (BAFTA), was an award ceremony honouring achievement in the field of video games in 2009. Candidate games must have been released in the United Kingdom between 1 January 2009 and 31 December 2009. The ceremony took place in the London Hilton on 19 March 2010.

== Categories ==
Both publishers and developers were eligible to enter their games in fifteen categories, fourteen of which were awarded by a panel of judges. The categories are: Gameplay, Casual, Sports, Story and Character, Strategy, Best use of Audio, New Talent, Multiplayer, Best Technical Achievement, Original Score, Handheld, People's Choice (the only award voted for by the public), Artistic Achievement, Best Action and Adventure and Best Game.

== Winners and nominees ==
Winners are shown first in bold.

| **Action**: **Uncharted 2: Among Thieves – Naughty Dog/Sony Computer Entertainment**; Assassin's Creed II – Ubisoft Montreal/Ubisoft; Batman: Arkham Asylum – Rocksteady Studios/Eidos Interactive and Warner Bros. Interactive Entertainment; Call of Duty: Modern Warfare 2 – Infinity Ward/Activision; inFAMOUS – Sucker Punch Productions/Sony Computer Entertainment; Left 4 Dead 2 – Valve/Valve | **Sports**: **FIFA 10 – EA Canada/EA Sports**; Colin McRae: DiRT 2 – Codemasters/Codemasters; Football Manager 2010 – Sports Interactive/Sega; Forza Motorsport 3 – Turn 10 Studios/Microsoft Game Studios; Wii Fit Plus – Nintendo EAD Group No. 5/Nintendo; Wii Sports Resort – Nintendo EAD Group No. 2/Nintendo |
| **Artistic Achievement**: **Flower – thatgamecompany/Sony Computer Entertainment**; Assassin's Creed II – Ubisoft Montreal/Ubisoft; Batman: Arkham Asylum – Rocksteady Studios/Eidos Interactive and Warner Bros. Interactive Entertainment; Call of Duty: Modern Warfare 2 – Infinity Ward/Activision; Street Fighter IV – Dimps and Capcom/Capcom; Uncharted 2: Among Thieves – Naughty Dog/Sony Computer Entertainment | **Story**: **Uncharted 2: Among Thieves – Amy Hennig, Neil Druckmann, Josh Scherr, Naughty Dog/Sony Computer Entertainment**; Assassin's Creed II – Corey May, Joshua Rubin, Jeffrey Yohalem, and Dooma Wendschuh, Ubisoft Montreal/Ubisoft; Batman: Arkham Asylum – Paul Dini, Rocksteady Studios/Eidos Interactive and Warner Bros. Interactive Entertainment; Broken Sword: The Shadow of the Templars – Director's Cut – Revolution Software/Ubisoft; Brütal Legend – Tim Schafer, Double Fine Productions/Electronic Arts; Dragon Age: Origins – David Gaider, BioWare/Electronic Arts |
| **Best Game**: **Batman: Arkham Asylum – Rocksteady Studios/Eidos Interactive and Warner Bros. Interactive Entertainment**; Assassin's Creed II – Ubisoft Montreal/Ubisoft; Call of Duty: Modern Warfare 2 – Infinity Ward/Activision; FIFA 10 – EA Canada/EA Sports; Left 4 Dead 2 – Valve/Valve; Uncharted 2: Among Thieves– Naughty Dog/Sony Computer Entertainment | **Strategy**: **Empire: Total War – Creative Assembly/Sega**; Command & Conquer: Red Alert 3 – Uprising – EA Los Angeles/Electronic Arts; FIFA Manager 10 – Bright Future GmbH/Electronic Arts; Football Manager 2010 – Sports Interactive/Sega; Halo Wars – Ensemble Studios/Microsoft Game Studios; Plants vs. Zombies – PopCap Games/PopCap Games |
| **Family & Social**: **Wii Sports Resort – Nintendo EAD Group No. 2/Nintendo**; The Beatles: Rock Band – Harmonix/MTV Games; Buzz! Quiz World – Relentless Software/Sony Computer Entertainment Europe; EyePet – London Studio and Playlogic Game Factory/Sony Computer Entertainment; Guitar Hero 5 – Neversoft/Activision; New Super Mario Bros. Wii – Nintendo EAD/Nintendo | **Use of Audio**: **Uncharted 2: Among Thieves – Naughty Dog/Sony Computer Entertainment**; Batman: Arkham Asylum – Rocksteady Studios/Eidos Interactive and Warner Bros. Interactive Entertainment; Call of Duty: Modern Warfare 2 – Infinity Ward/Activision; DJ Hero – FreeStyleGames and Exient Entertainment/Activision; Flower – thatgamecompany/Sony Computer Entertainment; Left 4 Dead 2 – Valve/Valve |
| **Gameplay**: **Batman: Arkham Asylum – Rocksteady Studios/Eidos Interactive and Warner Bros. Interactive Entertainment**; Assassin's Creed II – Ubisoft Montreal/Ubisoft; Call of Duty: Modern Warfare 2 – Infinity Ward/Activision; New Super Mario Bros. Wii – Nintendo EAD/Nintendo; PixelJunk Shooter – Q-Games and Double Eleven/Q-Games; Uncharted 2: Among Thieves – Naughty Dog/Sony Computer Entertainment | **Use of Online**: **FIFA 10 – EA Canada/EA Sports**; Battlefield 1943 – EA DICE/Electronic Arts; Call of Duty: Modern Warfare 2 – Infinity Ward/Activision; LittleBigPlanet – SCE Studio Cambridge and Media Molecule/Sony Computer Entertainment; SingStar Take That – London Studio/Sony Computer Entertainment Europe; Uncharted 2: Among Thieves – Naughty Dog/Sony Computer Entertainment |
| **Handheld**: **LittleBigPlanet – SCE Studio Cambridge and Media Molecule/Sony Computer Entertainment**; Gran Turismo – Polyphony Digital/Sony Computer Entertainment; LocoRoco Midnight Carnival – Japan Studio/Sony Computer Entertainment; Mario & Luigi: Bowser's Inside Story – AlphaDream/Nintendo; Professor Layton and Pandora's Box – Level-5, Nintendo; Scribblenauts – 5th Cell/Warner Bros. Interactive Entertainment | **BAFTA One's to Watch Award (in association with Dare to Be Digital)**: **Shrunk! – The Butterflyers**; Colour Coded; Quick as Thieves |
| **Multiplayer**: **Left 4 Dead 2 – Valve/Valve**; Battlefield 1943 – EA DICE/Electronic Arts; The Beatles: Rock Band – Harmonix/MTV Games; Call of Duty: Modern Warfare 2 – Infinity Ward/Activision; Halo 3 ODST – Bungie/Microsoft Game Studios; Uncharted 2: Among Thieves – Naughty Dog/Sony Computer Entertainment | **GAME Award of 2009**: **Call of Duty: Modern Warfare 2 – Infinity Ward/Activision**; Assassin's Creed II – Ubisoft Montreal/Ubisoft; Batman: Arkham Asylum – Rocksteady Studios/Eidos Interactive and Warner Bros. Interactive Entertainment; The Beatles: Rock Band –Harmonix/MTV Games; FIFA 10 – EA Canada/EA Sports; Grand Theft Auto: Chinatown Wars – Rockstar Leeds and Rockstar North/Rockstar Games; The Legend of Zelda: Spirit Tracks – Nintendo EAD Group No. 3/Nintendo; Street Fighter IV – Dimps and Capcom/Capcom; Uncharted 2: Among Thieves – Naughty Dog/Sony Computer Entertainment; Wii Sports Resort – Nintendo EAD Group No. 2/Nintendo |
**Original Score**: **Uncharted 2: Among Thieves – Greg Edmonson, Carmen Rizzo, Naughty Dog/Sony Computer Entertainment**; Assassin's Creed II – Jesper Kyd, Ubisoft Montreal/Ubisoft; Batman: Arkham Asylum – Nick Arundel, Ron Fish, Rocksteady Studios/Eidos Interactive and Warner Bros. Interactive Entertainment; Call of Duty: Modern Warfare 2 – Lorne Balfe, Hans Zimmer, Infinity Ward/Activision; Harry Potter and the Half-Blood Prince – James Hannigan, EA Bright Light Studio/Electronic Arts; PixelJunk Shooter – High Frequency, Bandwidth, Alex Paterson, and Dom Beken, Q-Games and Double Eleven/Q-Games

=== Academy Fellowship ===
- **Shigeru Miyamoto**

=== Games with multiple nominations and wins ===
==== Nominations ====
| Nominations | Game |
|---|---|
| 10 | Uncharted 2: Among Thieves |
| 9 | Call of Duty: Modern Warfare 2 |
| 8 | Batman: Arkham Asylum |
| 7 | Assassin's Creed II |
| 4 | FIFA 10 |
| 4 | Left 4 Dead 2 |
| 3 | The Beatles: Rock Band |
| 3 | Wii Sports Resort |
| 2 | Battlefield 1943 |
| 2 | Flower |
| 2 | Football Manager 2010 |
| 2 | LittleBigPlanet |
| 2 | PixelJunk Shooter |
| 2 | Street Fighter IV |

==== Wins ====
| Awards | Game |
|---|---|
| 4 | Uncharted 2: Among Thieves |
| 2 | Batman: Arkham Asylum |
| 2 | FIFA 10 |
