= SingStar Take That =

2009 video game

- Developer: London Studio
- Publisher: Sony Computer Entertainment
- Platforms: PlayStation 2, PlayStation 3
- Release: EU: 23 October 2009 (PS3; mic); AU: 5 November 2009; EU: 6 November 2009
- Genre: Karaoke
- Modes: Single-player, multiplayer

SingStar Take That is a 2009 music video game developed by London Studio and published by Sony Computer Entertainment for the PlayStation 2 and PlayStation 3. It is the third band-specific SingStar game released in the UK and Australia, following up on SingStar ABBA and SingStar Queen. It was released in 2009.

== Gameplay ==
SingStar games require players to sing along with music in order to score points. Players interface with their console via SingStar USB microphones while a music video plays in the background. The pitch players are required to sing is displayed as horizontal grey bars, which function similar to a musical stave, with corresponding lyrics displayed at the bottom of the screen. The game analyses a player's pitch and compares it to the original track, with players scoring points based on how accurate their singing is. Different modes of SingStar may vary this basic pattern, but the principle is similar throughout.

SingStar includes a variety of game modes. The standard singing mode allows one or two people to sing simultaneously, either competitively or in a duet.

The PlayStation 3 version of the game supports trophies.

== Launch ==
SingStar Take That was launched at the SingStar Take That Extravaganza charity party on Wednesday 25 November 2009 at The Tabernacle in Notting Hill, London. The event was hosted by comedian James Corden and featured a number of celebrity guests including Kate Moss, Kate Nash, Pixie Geldof, Rachel Stevens, Remi Nicole, Paloma Faith and the band Take That themselves. The event came later than originally scheduled and after the game launched in the shops due to the unfortunate death of Gary Barlow's father. The band entertained guests by performing their song "Rule the World", which is also in the game.

== Track list ==
- "A Million Love Songs"
- "Babe"
- "Back for Good"
- "Beautiful World"
- "Could It Be Magic"
- "Do What U Like"
- "Everything Changes"
- "Greatest Day"
- "Hold Up a Light"
- "I'd Wait for Life"
- "It Only Takes a Minute"
- "Love Ain't Here Anymore"
- "Never Forget"
- "Once You've Tasted Love"
- "Patience"
- "Pray"
- "Promises"
- "Reach Out"
- "Relight My Fire"
- "Rule the World"
- "Said It All"
- "Shine"
- "Sure"
- "Up All Night"
- "Why Can't I Wake Up with You"

== Reception ==
Reception

Aggregate score
Aggregator	Score	
Aggregator	PS2	PS3
GameRankings	68%	75%

Review scores
Publication	Score	
Publication	PS2	PS3
Eurogamer	N/A	8/10
PlayStation Official Magazine – UK	N/A	8/10
PALGN	N/A	6/10
PSM3	N/A	75%

The PlayStation 3 version received "favorable" reviews, while the PlayStation 2 version received "average" reviews, according to the review aggregation website GameRankings.
