= SingStar (2007 video game) =

- Developer: London Studio
- Publisher: Sony Computer Entertainment
- Platforms: PlayStation 3, PlayStation 4
- Release: AU: December 6, 2007; EU: December 7, 2007; NA: May 20, 2008
- Genre: Music
- Modes: Single-player, multiplayer

SingStar is a competitive karaoke game for the PlayStation 3, and is a follow-up to the PlayStation 2 SingStar series. SingStar is developed by London Studio and published by Sony Computer Entertainment. This is the first SingStar game for the PS3.

== Features ==
Unlike most previous SingStar games, SingStar for the PlayStation 3 features the ability to remove vocals. The songs feature the original music artist, and can be adapted from a single track master as with previous versions. SingStar then attempts to digitally remove the vocals from the track. The game will also allow users to fade out the vocal track once it detects the user singing, and return it if the user stops. The technology is unable to work on some songs due to the way they were mixed during recording.

The game shipped with 30 songs on disc, with the ability to download more songs from the online SingStore. The SingStore initially launched with 41 songs, including selected songs from the PS2 back catalogue, with more songs to be added regularly. The downloads feature the entire music video, and are in high definition where available.

My SingStar Online is the online component of SingStar. The idea for My SingStar Online was inspired by people uploading photos and videos of SingStar parties to websites such as Flickr and YouTube. The game could record photos and videos of players singing with the PlayStation Eye and the PS2 EyeToy, then be saved to the PlayStation's HDD or uploaded to the My SingStar Online network. Users could able to rate each other's performances and leave comments on their profiles.

Existing SingStar-brand USB microphones are compatible with the new game. Wireless Bluetooth microphones were under development but weren't ready in time for the launch, as originally promised. The newer Wireless microphones were released in March 2009, using a USB receiver to communicate with the microphones and not a bluetooth connection as previously stated.

== Track lists ==
Tracks that were demonstrated at E³ 2006, but do not appear on the final track list, are: Avril Lavigne's "Complicated", Coldplay's "Speed of Sound", Culture Club's "Karma Chameleon", Franz Ferdinand's "Do You Want To", Marilyn Manson's "Personal Jesus", Queen's "Don't Stop Me Now", Soft Cell's "Tainted Love" and The Darkness's "I Believe in a Thing Called Love".

Also, David Bowie's "Let's Dance", Franz Ferdinand's "Do You Want To", Pixies's "Here Comes Your Man" and Queens of the Stone Age's "Go with the Flow" were on the provisional track list for SingStar PS3.

Many of these were available (for an additional charge) from the SingStore.

=== On disc ===
The following table lists songs available on SingStar for the PlayStation 3 video game console. Country of release is indicated by two-letter country codes. For titles which were localised for multiple markets, songs are either indicated as present ("Yes") or absent ("No") in the track list for each localised version.

Artist	Song Title	UK	US	DE	ES	FR	NO
Alejandro Sanz	Corazón Partío	No	No	Yes	Yes	No	No
Alexander With	The Other Side	No	No	No	No	No	Yes
Amy Winehouse	"Back to Black"	No	Yes	No	No	No	No
Ana Torroja	"No me canso"	No	No	No	Yes	No	No
Anaïs	"Mon Cœur Mon Amour"	No	No	No	No	Yes	No
Andrés Calamaro	"Estadio Azteca"	No	No	No	Yes	No	No
Aphex Twin	"Come to Daddy"	Yes	No	No	No	No	No
The Automatic	"Monster"	Yes	Yes	No	No	No	No
Beck	"Loser"	No	Yes	No	No	No	No
Bjorn Eidsvag & Elvira Nikolaisen	"Floden"	No	No	No	No	No	Yes
Blind Melon	"No Rain"	No	Yes	No	No	No	No
Blink-182	"All the Small Things"	Yes	Yes	Yes	Yes	No	No
Blur	"Coffee & TV"	Yes	No	No	No	No	No
Britney Spears	"Toxic"	Yes	Yes	Yes	Yes	Yes	Yes
Camille	"Paris"	No	No	No	No	Yes	No
El Canto Del Loco	"Ya nada volverá a ser como antes"	No	No	No	Yes	No	No
The Cardigans	"Lovefool"	Yes	Yes	Yes	Yes	Yes	Yes
Chambao	"Pokito a poko"	No	No	No	Yes	No	No
Charlotte Gainsbourg	"The Songs That We Sing"	No	No	No	No	Yes	No
Christina Stürmer	"Nie genug"	No	No	Yes	No	No	No
Coldplay	"Clocks"	No	Yes	No	No	No	No
Coldplay	"Fix You"	Yes	No	Yes	Yes	Yes	Yes
Corinne Bailey Rae	"Put Your Records On"	No	Yes	No	No	No	No
Daft Punk	"One More Time"	No	No	No	No	Yes	No
Dave Matthews Band	"Crash into Me"	No	Yes	No	No	No	No
David Bowie	"Let's Dance"	No	Yes	No	No	No	No
Deluxe	"Que no"	No	No	No	Yes	No	No
Dennis Waterman	"I Could Be So Good for You"	Yes	No	No	No	No	No
Depeche Mode	"Precious"	No	No	Yes	No	No	No
Elvira Nikolaisen	"Love I Can't Defend"	No	No	No	No	No	Yes
Faith No More	"Epic"	No	Yes	No	No	No	No
Fangoria	"No sé qué me das"	No	No	No	Yes	No	No
Fito & Fitipaldis	"Soldadito marinero"	No	No	No	Yes	No	No
Fools Garden	"Lemon Tree"	No	No	Yes	No	No	No
Franz Ferdinand	"Do You Want To"	No	Yes	No	No	No	No
The Fratellis	"Chelsea Dagger"	Yes	No	No	No	No	No
Gaute Ormåsen	"Kjærlighet er mer enn forelskelse"	No	No	No	No	No	Yes
Gorillaz	"Feel Good, Inc."	Yes	No	Yes	No	Yes	Yes
Gwen Stefani	"Cool"	Yes	No	Yes	No	Yes	No
Iván Ferreiro	"Turnedo"	No	No	No	Yes	No	No
Jane's Addiction	"Been Caught Stealing"	No	Yes	No	No	No	No
Joaquín Sabina	"19 días y 500 noches"	No	No	No	Yes	No	No
Junior Senior	"Move Your Feet"	Yes	No	Yes	No	Yes	No
Kaizers Orchestra	"Maestro"	No	No	No	No	No	Yes
Kaolin	"Partons Vite"	No	No	No	No	Yes	No
Karpe diem	"Piano"	No	No	No	No	No	Yes
Karpe diem	"Show"	No	No	No	No	No	Yes
Katerine	"Louxor J'Adore"	No	No	No	No	Yes	No
The Killers	"Mr. Brightside"	Yes	Yes	No	Yes	Yes	No
Lilyjets	"Perfect Picture"	No	No	No	No	No	Yes
Loquillo y Los Trogloditas	"Feo, fuerte y formal"	No	No	No	Yes	No	No
Lou Bega	"Mambo No. 5 (A Little Bit Of...)"	No	No	Yes	No	No	No
-M-	"Mama Sam (Live)"	No	No	No	No	Yes	No
M Clan	"Quédate a dormir"	No	No	No	Yes	No	No
Macy Gray	"I Try"	Yes	No	Yes	No	Yes	Yes
Margaret Berger	"Samantha"	No	No	No	No	No	Yes
Maria Mena	"Just Hold Me"	No	No	No	No	No	Yes
Marit Larsen	"Don't Save Me"	No	No	No	No	No	Yes
Miguel Bosé con Rafa Sánchez	"Manos vacías"	No	No	No	Yes	No	No
Mikel Erentxun	"Mañana"	No	No	No	Yes	No	No
Mira Craig	"Boogeyman"	No	No	No	No	No	Yes
Musical Youth	"Pass the Dutchie"	Yes	No	Yes	No	No	No
Najoua Belyzel	"Gabriel"	No	No	No	No	Yes	No
Nelly Furtado	"Powerless (Say What You Want)"	No	No	Yes	No	No	No
New Found Glory	"My Friends Over You"	No	Yes	No	No	No	No
Ne-Yo	"So Sick"	Yes	Yes	No	No	No	No
Olivia Ruiz	"La Femme Chocolat"	No	No	No	No	Yes	No
Orson	"No Tomorrow"	Yes	No	No	No	No	No
OutKast	"Hey Ya!"	Yes	Yes	Yes	Yes	Yes	Yes
Oxmo Puccino	"Avoir Des Potes"	No	No	No	No	Yes	No
Paperboys	"Keep It Cool"	No	No	No	No	No	Yes
Pastora	"Lola"	No	No	No	Yes	No	No
Pereza	"Si quieres bailamos"	No	No	No	Yes	No	No
Phoenix	"If I Ever Feel Better"	No	No	No	No	Yes	No
Pixies	"Here Comes Your Man"	No	Yes	No	No	No	No
Primal Scream	"Movin' On Up"	Yes	No	No	No	No	No
The Pussycat Dolls	"Beep"	Yes	Yes	Yes	No	Yes	Yes
R.E.M.	"Losing My Religion"	Yes	Yes	Yes	Yes	Yes	Yes
Radiohead	"No Surprises"	Yes	Yes	No	Yes	Yes	Yes
Ramones	"I Wanna Be Sedated"	No	Yes	No	No	No	No
Ravi	"Ås to i Osjlo"	No	No	No	No	No	Yes
Ravi & DJ Løv	"E-ore"	No	No	No	No	No	Yes
Razorlight	"America"	Yes	No	No	No	Yes	Yes
Reamonn	"Tonight"	No	No	Yes	No	No	No
Robbie Williams & Nicole Kidman	"Somethin' Stupid"	Yes	No	Yes	Yes	Yes	Yes
The Rolling Stones	"Sympathy for the Devil"	No	Yes	No	No	No	No
Ronan Keating	"Lovin' Each Day"	No	No	Yes	No	No	No
Rosana	"El talismán"	No	No	No	Yes	No	No
Rosario	"Qué bonito"	No	No	No	Yes	No	No
Rose	"La Liste"	No	No	No	No	Yes	No
Rosenstolz	"Auch im Regen"	No	No	Yes	No	No	No
Sarah Connor	"Bounce"	No	No	Yes	No	No	No
Scissor Sisters	"I Don't Feel Like Dancin'"	Yes	Yes	Yes	Yes	No	No
Sinclair	"A Chaque Seconde"	No	No	No	No	Yes	No
The Smashing Pumpkins	"Today"	No	Yes	No	No	No	No
The Stone Roses	"She Bangs the Drums"	Yes	No	No	No	No	No
Superbus	"Butterfly"	No	No	No	No	Yes	No
Supergrass	"Alright"	Yes	No	Yes	Yes	No	Yes
Texas Lightning	"No No Never"	No	No	Yes	No	No	No
Tokio Hotel	"Der letzte Tag"	No	No	Yes	No	No	No
Twisted Sister	"We're Not Gonna Take It"	Yes	No	Yes	No	No	Yes
U2	"Beautiful Day"	Yes	Yes	Yes	No	Yes	Yes
US5	"Maria"	No	No	Yes	No	No	No
Warrant	"Cherry Pie"	No	Yes	No	No	No	No
Weezer	"Buddy Holly"	Yes	Yes	Yes	Yes	No	No
Wolfmother	"Love Train"	Yes	Yes	No	No	Yes	Yes
The Zutons	"Valerie"	Yes	No	No	No	No	No
Artist	Song title	UK	US	DE	ES	FR	NO

== Reception ==
Reception

Aggregate score
Aggregator	Score
Metacritic	82/100

Review scores
Publication	Score
1Up.com	B+
Edge	8/10
Eurogamer	8/10
Game Informer	8/10
GameRevolution	C+
GameSpot	7.5/10
GameZone	8.2/10
Giant Bomb	4/5
IGN	8.5/10
PlayStation: The Official Magazine	4/5
The A.V. Club	B

SingStar received "generally favorable" reviews from critics, according to review aggregator Metacritic.
