= PlayStation VR Worlds =

2016 video game

- North American packaging artwork
- Developer: London Studio
- Publisher: Sony Interactive Entertainment
- Director: Russ Harding
- Producers: Tom Handley; Andrew Jamison; James Oates
- Designer: Simon Hermitage
- Artist: Joel Smith
- Composer: Joe Thwaites
- Platform: PlayStation 4
- Release: 10 October 2016
- Genre: Various
- Mode: Single-player

PlayStation VR Worlds is a 2016 video game compilation developed by London Studio and published by Sony Interactive Entertainment for the PlayStation 4. It was released on 10 October 2016 as a launch game for the PlayStation VR virtual reality headset. The game includes five different experiences of varying genres, ranging from sports games to first-person shooters. Upon release, the game received mixed reviews from critics, who praised the London Heist experience but criticized the high initial launch price and short length.

== Gameplay ==
PlayStation VR Worlds features five different experiences, which themselves also contain different modes of play:

- Danger Ball: A sports game set in the future where the player avatar uses their head to hit a ball on a wall or opponent adjacent to them. Three different gameplay modes are present: Score Attack (where the goal is to bounce the ball on various scoring tiles), Tournament (which sees the player playing against a series of six random AI opponents, each of whom have special moves that can change the ball's properties in some way), and Quickplay (allowing the play to be pitted against any individual AI opponent).
- London Heist: A first-person shooter where the player controls a mobster who is tasked to steal a diamond. Two different gameplay modes present: Story (where the player progresses though the game's main story) and Mickey's Shooting Range (where the player can practice shooting targets).
- Ocean Descent: A simulation game where the character descends to the depth of the ocean and observes different marine wildlife. There are three variations of the dive, with one of them featuring an underwater shark attack.
- Scavenger's Odyssey: An action game set in outer space where the player controls an alien operating a vehicle. The goal of the game is to travel around various celestial bodies and defeat aliens though the use of the vehicle's scavenger beam and pulse cannons.
- VR Luge: A racing game where the player character leans on a street luge sled and slides down a highway while evading other vehicles. Two different gameplay modes are present: VR Luge Tour (which sees the player racing through four different tracks in a set amount of time) and Time Trial (which has the player race though one track in the shortest amount of time possible).

Each experience is selected through a hub world.

== Development ==
The game was developed by London Studio and was officially revealed on 15 March 2016. Prior to the game's announcement, Ocean Descent (formerly known as Into the Deep), London Heist and VR Luge were all created as tech demos for the PlayStation VR. While each of the games can be played with the headset and DualShock 4 controller, London Heist is the only experience which supports the use of the PlayStation Move controller.

Joe Thwaites, the game's composer, noted that VR Worlds was one of the most difficult games he had worked on. One of the big challenges was to make the sound of each experience sound unique while simultaneously maintaining a sense of cohesion in the whole package.

The game was released on 10 October 2016.

== Reception ==
Reception

Aggregate score
| Aggregator | Score |
|---|---|
| Metacritic | 59/100 |

Review scores
| Publication | Score |
|---|---|
| GameSpot | 6/10 |
| GamesRadar+ | 3.5/5 |
| IGN | 6/10 |

The game received mixed reviews according to review aggregator Metacritic. London Heist was commonly named by critics as one of the game's best experiences, with Jimmy Thang's GameSpot review highlighting the usage of the PlayStation Move controller in gameplay and how the use of VR allowed for a more immersive feeling of violence. Ocean Descent was also praised, though many critics also noted it as a "passive" experience. Scavenger's Odyssey was heavily criticized for inducing motion sickness. The game's lack of replayability and expensive price were also criticized, with Chris Carter from Destructoid referring to the title as a "paid demo".

== Legacy ==
Many of the gameplay ideas that first got introduced in London Heist were expanded into a full game, Blood & Truth, which released on May 28, 2019. Like PlayStation VR Worlds, it was also developed by London Studio.

One of the Bots in Astro's Playroom references the Ocean Descent experience, showcasing a Bot inside of a cage submerged underwater while wearing a PlayStation VR headset.
