= SingStar ABBA =

2008 video game

- North American PlayStation 3 cover art
- Developer: London Studio
- Publisher: Sony Computer Entertainment
- Composers: Benny Andersson, Björn Ulvaeus
- Series: SingStar
- Platforms: PlayStation 2, PlayStation 3
- Release: EU: November 14, 2008; AU: November 20, 2008; NA: December 2, 2008
- Genre: Music
- Modes: Single-player, multiplayer

SingStar ABBA is a singing/voice simulation video game released in 2008 for the PlayStation 2 and PlayStation 3. It was the first band specific SingStar game, followed by SingStar Queen in 2009.

== Development ==
David Reeves, president of Sony Computer Entertainment Europe, said of the release: "We are thrilled to be collaborating with ABBA to bring their tracks to SingStar this Christmas... The popularity of this iconic band continues year after year, and we know SingStar fans will be delighted to add this selection of classics tracks to their SingStar collection".

Patrick Foster of The Times reported that "Bocu, the British music publisher that acquired the British rights to ABBA’s songs more than 30 years ago... collaborated with Sony to release Singstar Abba".

== Gameplay ==
Arnold Katayev of PSXtreme explained that the game "uses a very clean user interface, one that even a five-year-old can navigate. You can either play a practice session, or play for points and attempt to score the best record", further adding: "The object is to fill the bars on screen with accuracy by singing as accurately as possible. If you go flat, you'll get color below the bar; likewise, if you go sharp, you'll get color above the bar. It's a very intuitive system, and figuring out how it works doesn't take any longer than 10 seconds".

== Track list ==
The PlayStation 2 version of the game features 20 songs whereas the PlayStation 3 version features 25 songs.

Title	On PlayStation 2 version	On PlayStation 3 version
"Chiquitita"	Yes	Yes
"Dancing Queen"	Yes	Yes
"Does Your Mother Know"	Yes	Yes
"Fernando"	Yes	Yes
"Gimme! Gimme! Gimme! (A Man After Midnight)"	Yes	Yes
"Happy New Year"	No	Yes
"Head Over Heels"	No	Yes
"I Do, I Do, I Do, I Do, I Do"	Yes	Yes
"Knowing Me, Knowing You"	Yes	Yes
"Mamma Mia"	Yes	Yes
"Money, Money, Money"	Yes	Yes
"One of Us"	Yes	Yes
"Ring Ring"	Yes	Yes
"SOS"	Yes	Yes
"Summer Night City"	Yes	Yes
"Super Trouper"	Yes	Yes
"Take a Chance on Me"	Yes	Yes
"Thank You for the Music"	Yes	Yes
"The Day Before You Came"	No	Yes
"The Name of the Game"	Yes	Yes
"The Winner Takes It All"	Yes	Yes
"Under Attack"	No	Yes
"Voulez-Vous"	Yes	Yes
"Waterloo"	Yes	Yes
"When All Is Said and Done"	No	Yes

== Reception ==
Reception

Aggregate score
Aggregator	Score	
Aggregator	PS2	PS3
Metacritic	64/100	70/100

Review scores
Publication	Score	
Publication	PS2	PS3
Eurogamer	N/A	7/10
GameSpot	N/A	7/10
GameZone	7/10	7/10
IGN	5.5/10	5.5/10
PlayStation Official Magazine – UK	N/A	9/10
PALGN	N/A	7/10
PlayStation: The Official Magazine	N/A	4/5

The game received "mixed or average reviews" on both platforms according to the review aggregation website Metacritic.
