= SingStar Dance =

2010 video game

- European cover art
- Developer: London Studio
- Publisher: Sony Computer Entertainment
- Series: SingStar
- Engine: Custom
- Platform: PlayStation 3
- Release: NA: 9 November 2010; EU: 5 November 2010
- Genres: Music, exercise
- Modes: Single-player, multiplayer

SingStar Dance is a 2010 music video game developed by London Studio and published by Sony Computer Entertainment for the PlayStation 3. It is a spin-off of the SingStar series. It utilizes the PlayStation Move controller for dancing.

A title in the SingStar series, it was advertised and released alongside SingStar Guitar as part of a campaign to showcase the new roles of dancing (through use of the PlayStation Move controller) and guitar playing (through use of any compatible guitar controller; in much the same fashion as in Guitar Hero). SingStar Dance enabled players to assume the in-game roles of singing, dancing, and guitar, although not all songs that could be played on the software (either on-disc or through the SingStore) had all three roles available. A maximum of two different roles could be assumed for a song at a time, and a maximum of two players could play the same kind of role, thus enabling up to four players to play simultaneously.

During the 14th Annual Interactive Achievement Awards, the Academy of Interactive Arts & Sciences nominated SingStar Dance for "Family Game of the Year".

London Studio would release their first title for DanceStar Party, a spin-off series more primarily dedicated to dancing, in 2011.

== Music ==
=== On-disc ===
The following track list is the line-up of music included in the release of SingStar Dance: Country of release is indicated by two-letter country codes. For titles localized in multiple markets, songs are either indicated as present () or absent () in the track list for each localized version

Song	Artist	US/UK	ES
"Bye Bye Bye"	NSYNC	Yes	No
"4""	Amaia Montero	No	Yes
"Marta, Sebas, Guille y los demás"	Amaral	No	Yes
"Shut Up"	The Black Eyed Peas	Yes	Yes
"Heart of Glass"	Blondie	Yes	No
"Abrázame muy fuerte"	Bustamante	No	Yes
"Torero"	Chayanne	No	Yes
"With You"	Chris Brown	Yes	No
"Nunca tendré"	Coti	No	Yes
"Girls Just Wanna Have Fun"	Cyndi Lauper	Yes	No
"Esclavo de sus besos"	David Bisbal	No	Yes
"Baby Love"	Diana Ross and The Supremes	Yes	No
"Let Me Out"	Dover	No	Yes
"Por Querete"	Efecto Mariposa	No	Yes
"Eres Tonto"	El Canto Del Loco	No	Yes
"I Will Survive"	Gloria Gaynor	Yes	Yes
"Standing in the Way of Control"	Gossip	Yes	No
"What You Waiting For?"	Gwen Stefani	Yes	Yes
"Cosmic Girl"	Jamiroquai	Yes	No
"Lento"	Julia Venegas	No	Yes
"That's the Way (I Like It)"	KC & The Sunshine Band	Yes	No
"Day 'n' Nite"	Kid Cudi vs Crookers	Yes	No
"Celebration"	Kool and the Gang	Yes	No
"Poker Face"	Lady Gaga	Yes	Yes
"Bulletproof"	La Roux	Yes	No
"Tengo"	Macaco	No	Yes
"Cosos Que Suenen A..."	Maldita Nerea	No	Yes
"Toda"	Malú	No	Yes
"U Can't Touch This"	MC Hammer	Yes	No
"Como una vela"	Melendi	No	Yes
"Don Diablo"	Miguel Bosé	No	Yes
"Pantera en Libertad"	Mónica Naranjo	No	Yes
"Ay! Amor"	Nena Daconte	No	Yes
"Hangin' Tough"	New Kids on the Block	Yes	No
"Pop"	La Oreja de Van Gogh	No	Yes
"Hey Ya!"	Outkast	Yes	No
"Lola"	Pastora	No	Yes
"Straight Up"	Paula Abdul	Yes	No
"Causa y Efecto"	Paulina Rubio	No	Yes
"Todo me da Igual"	Pignoise	No	Yes
"I Know You Want Me (Calle Ocho)"	Pitbull	Yes	Yes
"I Like To Move It"	Reel 2 Real feat. The Mad Stuntman	Yes	Yes
"Livin' La Vida Loca"	Ricky Martin	Yes	Yes
"It's Like That"	Run DMC vs. Jason Nevins	Yes	No
"Push It"	Salt N Pepa	Yes	No
"Boombastic"	Shaggy	Yes	No
"Baby Got Back"	Sir Mix A Lot	Yes	No
"Crank That"	Soulja Boy Tell 'Em	Yes	No
"Everybody (Backstreet's Back)"	Backstreet Boys	Yes	Yes
"I Want You Back"	The Jackson 5	Yes	No
"Don't Cha"	The Pussycat Dolls	Yes	No
"Sólo quiero bailar"	Zenttric	No	Yes

=== Downloadable content ===
The following songs in the SingStore have "Dance add-ons" available:

Song	Artist	Release date
"Venus"	Bananarama	17 November 2010
"Achy Breaky Heart"	Billy Ray Cyrus	17 November 2010
"Baby One More Time"	Britney Spears	17 November 2010
"Fight For This Love"	Cheryl Cole	17 November 2010
"You Spin Me Round (Like A Record)"	Dead or Alive	17 November 2010
"Final Countdown"	Europe	17 November 2010
"Rhythm Is Gonna Get You"	Gloria Estefan	17 November 2010
"Step By Step"	New Kids On The Block	17 November 2010
"Cotton Eye Joe"	Rednex	17 November 2010
"It's Raining Men"	The Weather Girls	17 November 2010
"I Think We're Alone Now"	Tiffany	17 November 2010
"I Wanna Dance With Somebody"	Whitney Houston	17 November 2010
"Free Your Mind"	En Vogue	1 December 2010
"That's Not My Name"	The Ting Tings	1 December 2010
"Barbie Girl"	Aqua	1 December 2010
"No Limit"	2 Unlimited	15 December 2010
"Take On Me"	a-ha	15 December 2010
"Sk8er Boi"	Avril Lavigne	15 December 2010
"One Two Step"	Ciara	15 December 2010
"Come On Eileen"	Dexy's Midnight Runners	15 December 2010
"Just Dance"	Lady Gaga feat. Colby O'Donis	15 December 2010
"99 Red Balloons"	Nena	15 December 2010
"Get The Party Started"	P!nk	15 December 2010
"Never Gonna Give You Up"	Rick Astley	15 December 2010
"We Are Family"	Sister Sledge	15 December 2010
"Relight My Fire"	Take That Featuring Lulu	15 December 2010
"Heartbreaker"	will.i.am Feat Cheryl Cole	15 December 2010
"Born To Make You Happy"	Britney Spears	5 January 2011
"Love Machine"	Girls Aloud	5 January 2011
"Mambo No. 5 (A Little Bit Of...)"	Lou Bega	5 January 2011
"Build Me Up Buttercup"	The Foundations	5 January 2011
"Dance Wiv Me"	Dizzee Rascal feat. Calvin Harris & Chrome	19 January 2011
"Goodbye Mr A"	The Hoosiers	19 January 2011
"Say A Little Prayer"	Aretha Franklin	19 January 2011
"Shake It"	Metro Station	19 January 2011
"Beat Again"	JLS	19 January 2011
"It's My Life"	Dr Alban	19 January 2011
"Heaven Is A Place On Earth"	Belinda Carlisle	2 February 2011
"Making Your Mind Up"	Bucks Fizz	2 February 2011
"Stop Me"	Mark Ronson feat. Daniel Merriweather	2 February 2011
"Everybody Get Up"	Five	2 February 2011
"Shut Up And Let Me Go"	The Ting Tings	2 February 2011
"Hit 'Em Up Style (Oops!)"	Blu Cantrell	16 February 2011
"Perfect"	Fairground Attraction	16 February 2011
"Since U Been Gone"	Kelly Clarkson	16 February 2011
"Take Your Mama"	Scissor Sisters	16 February 2011
"Eye Of The Tiger"	Survivor	16 February 2011
"I'm Outta Love"	Anastacia	2 March 2011
"Wishing Well"	Terence Trent D'Arby	2 March 2011
"Good Times"	Chic	2 March 2011
"Bad Romance"	Lady Gaga	2 March 2011
"Everybody In Love"	JLS	2 March 2011
"Grace Kelly"	Mika	16 March 2011
"Mysterious Girl"	Peter Andre	16 March 2011
"Heartbeat"	Scouting For Girls	16 March 2011
"When Will I Be Famous"	Bros	16 March 2011
"I Love Rock n Roll"	Britney Spears	30 March 2011
"Virtual Insanity"	Jamiroquai	30 March 2011
"Electric Feel"	MGMT	30 March 2011
"It's Tricky"	Run DMC	30 March 2011
"Boogie Wonderland"	Earth Wind & Fire	20 April 2011
"Dancing In The Moonlight"	Toploader	20 April 2011
"Break Your Heart"	Taio Cruz	20 April 2011
"Bonkers"	Dizzee Rascal/Armand Van Helden	20 April 2011
"We Ride"	Rihanna	15 June 2011
"Sing It Back"	Moloko	15 June 2011
"Hey Baby"	DJ Ötzi	15 June 2011
"Mercy"	Duffy	15 June 2011
"Movin' On Up"	M-People	30 June 2011
"The Only Way Is Up"	Yazz And The Plastic Population	30 June 2011
"Nu Flow"	Big Brovaz	11 July 2011
"O.P.P."	Naughty by Nature	11 July 2011
