= Blood & Truth =

2019 video game

- Developer: London Studio
- Publisher: Sony Interactive Entertainment
- Director: Guy Wilday
- Producers: Justin Der Gregorian; James Oates; Iain Riches
- Designer: Iain Wright
- Programmers: William Burdon; Mark Lintott
- Artists: Anthony Filice; Mike Bambury
- Writers: Iain Wright; Colin Harvey; Rick Porras
- Composers: Jim Fowler; Joe Thwaites
- Engine: LSSDK engine
- Platform: PlayStation 4
- Release: 28 May 2019
- Genre: First-person shooter
- Mode: Single-player

Blood & Truth is a first-person shooter developed by London Studio and published by Sony Interactive Entertainment. It was released on 28 May 2019 for the PlayStation 4's virtual reality headset PlayStation VR. It was the final game to be developed by London Studio before its closure.

== Gameplay ==
The game is a first-person shooter. The player assumes control of Ryan Marks, a former Special Forces soldier who must save his family from a London crime boss. Players can hide behind cover and pick up different guns to shoot enemies. To move in the game, players only need to look at a spot and press a button. The playable character will then automatically move to the spot. Players can also interact with different objects.

== Plot ==
The game begins with Ryan Marks being interrogated by an agent named Carson, who explains his current situation. During the interrogation, flashbacks show the events that happened up until the interrogation.

Ryan infiltrates a compound and rescues fellow soldier Deacon, and both escape the compound before Ryan is informed that his father has died from a heart attack. Ryan is sent back home in London and is picked up by his brother Nick from the airport. After the funeral, Ryan meets with his mother Anne, but then they are interrupted by gunfire, the family is then confronted by Tony Sharp, a London crime boss, Tony's brother Keach, and Kayla, a woman who supposedly works for Tony which kills one of Anne's bodyguards.

The family is held at gunpoint by Keach, including Ryan's sister, Michelle, but Keach is fooled by Nick into thinking that the gun's safety is on. At this moment, Michelle and Nick takedown Keach and knock him out, before the family then flees to their hidden safe house. The family then discovers that Tony will be at his private casino and Ryan volunteers to infiltrate the casino and kill Tony, although Anne is reluctant to the plan.

Ryan successfully infiltrates the casino but discovers that Tony is not in the building and is at his art gallery, but Keach still remains and Ryan tracks him down to a hotel room. After rigging the casino with bombs, Ryan confronts Keach and chases him through the building. Once he stops Keach, Ryan questions him on where Tony is, but Keach doesn't know where he is. Keach is either killed by Ryan or is suddenly killed by an armored guard and Ryan is able to escape and blow up the casino with the bombs he had rigged.

Ryan disguises himself and enters the art gallery during the day and discovers a private room that might contain information. Ryan and Nick then sneak into the gallery at night and vandalize most of the exhibits. The brothers are also able to find documents that all link back to Falstead Airfield.

After returning to the safe house, Tony calls the brothers along with Michelle to inform them that he has captured Anne and has held her in Freeson Towers, a building that is due for demolition.

The siblings work together to rescue Anne and Ryan is able to escape the demolition, however, Anne is then killed by Kayla, Michelle and Ryan are presumably arrested by the police while Nick goes off to hunt Tony. Back in the interrogation room, Ryan realizes that Carson is trying to recruit him into taking down Tony, to which Ryan agrees to help him while also guaranteeing Michelle's safety. Carson also reveals that there is a secret organization that is helping Tony.

Ryan infiltrates Falstead Airfield-hoping to find Nick-and discovers how the organization works. They sell black market materials and Carson explains that the organization uses the money to control society from the shadows. Ryan then escapes the Airfield.

Carson is able to track down where the materials are coming from and sends Deacon to the safehouse and the two form a plan to infiltrate the source and plant a trojan into the systems.

The plan goes well until Ryan is knocked out by gas and is captured by Tony and Kalya who reveal that they have also killed Nick. Tony orders Kayla to stay in the room with a tied up Ryan as he goes to find Michelle, but Kayla abandons Tony and reveals she is working for the organization and reveals that Ryan's dad was originally going to work with the organization, but because he had died, they were reluctantly forced to work with Tony and finally reveals that she knows Carson and asks Ryan to tell him 'Amanda says hi'.

Ryan escapes his captivity with help from Deacon and Ryan infiltrates Tony's tower alone. But when he confronts him, Tony reveals that he is hiding behind bulletproof glass and escapes, with Ryan following him.

With help from Michelle, Ryan is able to chase Tony to his private plane and jumps aboard mid-flight. On the plane, Carson tells Ryan that there is a bomb on the plane that is set to explode, Ryan confronts Tony and has the choice to kill Tony or listen to Tony as he recounts a childhood story. Either way, the plane explodes with Tony inside of it and Ryan is thrown out of the plane but survives thanks to a parachute he had found earlier in the plane.

Moments later, Carson explains to Ryan that Kayla's real name is Amanda Kincaide and that she was a respected CIA operative, but then she disappeared to work with the organization. Ryan and Carson then agree to go after the organization.

== Development ==
The game was based on the London Heist level in PlayStation VR Worlds and London Studio initially envisioned the game to be an installment in The Getaway series. London Studio described the game as a "love letter to classic cockney gangster movies" and took inspiration from other Hollywood blockbusters. The game was officially announced by publisher Sony Interactive Entertainment at Paris Games Week 2017. It was released for the virtual reality headset PlayStation VR on 28 May 2019.

== Reception ==
Reception

Aggregate scores
Aggregator	Score
Metacritic	80/100
OpenCritic	87% recommend

Review scores
Publication	Score
Destructoid	7.5/10
Edge	8/10
Game Informer	6.5/10
GameSpot	7/10
GamesRadar+	4/5
IGN	8.7/10
Jeuxvideo.com	16/20
PlayStation Official Magazine – UK	8/10
Push Square	8/10

The game received generally positive reviews from critics according to review aggregator website Metacritic. Fellow review aggregator OpenCritic assessed that the game received strong approval, being recommended by 87% of critics. The game topped the UK chart in its week of release, a first for a virtual reality game.

IGN enjoyed the game's set pieces, writing that "It's fun and novel just to actually be a part of scenes that I've watched play out in movies and shows a couple dozen times". While feeling the gunplay was a little simplistic, Road to VR praised the character animations of the game, "With photogrammetry, motion capture, and smart design, London Studio has raised the bar for virtual characters at a scale not seen in any VR game to date". UploadVR criticized the aiming for gunplay, feeling the PlayStation Move controllers limited the game: "Aiming requires lots of precision, so it's frustrating to say the least when you miss headshots because of inferior light-based motion controllers.

=== Awards ===
Year	Award	Category	Result	Ref.
2019	The Independent Game Developers' Association Awards	Best Action and Adventure Game	Nominated	
2019	The Independent Game Developers' Association Awards	Creativity Award	Nominated	
2019	The Independent Game Developers' Association Awards	Heritage Award	Won	
2019	The Independent Game Developers' Association Awards	Best Visual Design	Nominated	
2019	2019 Golden Joystick Awards	Best VR/AR Game	Nominated	
2019	2019 Golden Joystick Awards	PlayStation Game of the Year	Nominated	
2019	The Game Awards 2019	Best VR/AR Game	Nominated	
2020	New York Game Awards	Coney Island Dreamland Award for Best AR/VR Game	Nominated	
2020	23rd Annual D.I.C.E. Awards	Immersive Reality Game of the Year	Nominated	
2020	23rd Annual D.I.C.E. Awards	Immersive Reality Technical Achievement	Won	
2020	NAVGTR Awards	Direction in Virtual Reality	Nominated	
2020	MCV/Develop Awards	Visual Innovation of the Year	Nominated	
2020	MCV/Develop Awards	Audio Innovation of the Year	Nominated	
2020	Game Developers Choice Awards	Best VR/AR Game	Nominated	
2020	SXSW Gaming Awards	XR Game of the Year	Nominated	
2020	18th Annual G.A.N.G. Awards	Best Virtual Reality Audio	Nominated	
