= London Studio =

British video game developer

- Final logo used from 2016 to 2024
- Type: Subsidiary
- Industry: Video games
- Predecessor: SCEE Studio Camden; Team Soho
- Founded: 2002; 24 years ago
- Defunct: 21 May 2024
- Fate: Closed
- Headquarters: London, England
- Key people: Stuart Whyte; Tara Saunders
- Products: EyePet; SingStar; The Getaway; Blood & Truth; This Is Football
- Parent: Sony Computer Entertainment (2002–2005); PlayStation Studios (2005–2024)
- Website: playstationlondonstudio.com

London Studio (formerly also known as SCEE London Studio) was a British video game developer of PlayStation Studios based in London. Founded in 2002, it was best known for developing the SingStar series, as well as games for PlayStation's external peripherals including the EyeToy camera and the PlayStation VR virtual reality headset. The studio created more than 60 titles since it was established.

== History ==
=== SingStar and EyeToy ===
London Studio was established in 2002 following the merger of SCEE Studio Camden (formerly a division of Psygnosis) and Team Soho, the developer behind The Getaway. As London Studio, the studio developed the SingStar series, which became extremely popular and helped broaden the appeal of the PlayStation 2 beyond the typical demographics of young male gamers. The series sold more than 20 million copies within 6 years. It also created a lot of games for Sony's EyeToy webcam, and assisted the development of other Sony titles, such as Killzone 2 and LittleBigPlanet. The studio was working on two AAA exclusives for the PlayStation 3 including Eight Days and the sequel to The Getaway, but both were cancelled by Sony Europe as Sony wanted to reallocate resources to other first-party games.

=== Virtual reality ===
London Studio developed a virtual reality (VR) rendering technology, called LSSDK, which supports PlayStation 4 and PC. This engine was first used in PlayStation VR Worlds, which contained five virtual reality experiences: "The London Heist", "Into The Deep", "VR Luge", "Danger Ball" and "Scavenger's Odyssey". While VR Worlds received mixed reviews, "London Heist" was critically acclaimed, and the game was commercially successful. Developing titles for the virtual reality headset became the company's main focus. The studio's next game was Blood & Truth, which serves as the successor to the London Heist level. It became the first VR title to reach number 1 on the UK's retail sales chart when it was released in May 2019.

In 2022, the studio was working on a cooperative multiplayer game for the PlayStation 5. Set in a modern fantasy London, it was described by studio head Tara Saunders as the company's "most ambitious project to-date". Players wouldn't need to use a virtual reality headset to play this game.

=== Closure ===
In February 2024, Sony announced that it was proposing the closure of the studio as part of wider layoffs that includes 8% of the company's workforce, or 900 employees. The studio closed in May 2024.

== Games developed ==
Game	Year	Platform(s)
This Is Football 2003	2002	PlayStation 2
Hardware: Online Arena	2002	PlayStation 2
This Is Football 2004	2003	PlayStation 2
EyeToy: Play	2003	PlayStation 2
This Is Football 2005	2004	PlayStation 2
EyeToy: Groove	2004	PlayStation 2
SingStar	2004	PlayStation 2
The Getaway: Black Monday	2004	PlayStation 2
SingStar Party	2004	PlayStation 2
EyeToy: Chat	2005	PlayStation 2
World Tour Soccer: Challenge Edition	2005	PlayStation Portable
Fired Up	2005	PlayStation Portable
SingStar Pop	2005	PlayStation 2
EyeToy: Play 2	2005	PlayStation 2
EyeToy: Play 3	2005	PlayStation 2
SingStar '80s	2005	PlayStation 2
EyeToy: Kinetic	2005	PlayStation 2
EyeToy: Operation Spy	2005	PlayStation 2
EyeToy: Kinetic Combat	2006	PlayStation 2
EyeToy: Play Sports	2006	PlayStation 2
SingStar Rocks!	2006	PlayStation 2
SingStar Anthems	2006	PlayStation 2
Gangs of London	2006	PlayStation Portable
SingStar Legends	2006	PlayStation 2
World Tour Soccer 2	2006	PlayStation Portable
SingStar Pop Hits	2007	PlayStation 2
SingStar 90s	2007	PlayStation 2
SingStar Amped	2007	PlayStation 2
SingStar Rock Ballads	2007	PlayStation 2
Aqua Vita	2007	PlayStation 3
Operation Creature Feature	2007	PlayStation 3
Tori-Emaki	2007	PlayStation 3
SingStar R&B	2007	PlayStation 2
Beats	2007	PlayStation Portable
SingStar	2007	PlayStation 3
SingStar Summer Party	2008	PlayStation 2
SingStar Vol. 2	2008	PlayStation 3
SingStar ABBA	2008	PlayStation 2, PlayStation 3
SingStar Vol. 3	2008	PlayStation 3
PlayStation Home	2008	PlayStation 3
SingStar Queen	2009	PlayStation 2, PlayStation 3
SingStar Pop Edition	2009	PlayStation 3
SingStar Motown	2009	PlayStation 2, PlayStation 3
EyePet	2009	PlayStation 3, PlayStation Portable
SingStar Take That	2009	PlayStation 2, PlayStation 3
SingStar Guitar	2010	PlayStation 3
SingStar Dance	2010	PlayStation 3
DanceStar Party	2011	PlayStation 3
EyePet & Friends	2011	PlayStation 3
DanceStar Party Hits	2012	PlayStation 3
Wonderbook	2012	PlayStation 3
Diggs Nightcrawler	2013	PlayStation 3
SingStar: Ultimate Party	2014	PlayStation 3, PlayStation 4
PlayStation VR Worlds	2016	PlayStation 4
SingStar Celebration	2017	PlayStation 4
Blood & Truth	2019	PlayStation 4
Erica	2019	PlayStation 4
