= SingStar =

Video game series

- SingStar logo
- Genres: Party, Karaoke
- Developer: London Studio
- Publisher: Sony Interactive Entertainment
- First release: SingStar; May 2004
- Latest release: SingStar Celebration; October 2017

SingStar is a competitive karaoke music video game series developed by London Studio and published by Sony Interactive Entertainment. Dozens of installments were released for the PlayStation 2, and several more for the PlayStation 3. It is also available on the PlayStation 4 as a free app download, with users paying for the songs as individual or bundle downloads. The games have also undergone a number of non-English releases in various European countries.

SingStar games on disc for PlayStation 2 and PlayStation 3 are distributed either as the software alone, or bundled with a pair of USB microphones – one red, one blue; wireless microphones are also available. The games are compatible with the EyeToy, PlayStation Eye, and PlayStation 4 cameras, allowing players to see and record themselves singing. The PSP (PlayStation Portable) was also able to manage a playlist in realtime, where users were able to queue songs they wanted to sing, so the decisions weren't made between songs, leading to fewer breaks.

All SingStar and SingStore servers were shut down in January 2020. All offline content remained accessible after the shutdown.

== Overview ==
=== Gameplay ===
Screenshot from SingStar Rocks!, featuring the song "Dakota" by Stereophonics. Player 1 is shown in blue, while Player 2 is shown in red.

SingStar games require players to sing along with music in order to score points. Players interface with their console via SingStar microphones while a music video plays in the background. The pitch players are required to sing is displayed as horizontal grey bars, which function similar to a musical stave, with corresponding lyrics displayed at the bottom of the screen. The game analyses a player's pitch and timing which is compared to the original track, with players scoring points based on how accurate their singing is. Different modes of SingStar may vary this basic pattern, but the principle is similar throughout.

SingStar includes a variety of game modes. The standard singing mode allows one or two people to sing simultaneously, either competitively or in a duet. The game also offers a "Pass the Mic" mode, which allows up to eight people to play a series of rounds in two teams. The original SingStar for PlayStation 2 also featured "Star Maker", a single player career mode, but this was dropped in subsequent releases due to the popularity of the multiplayer and party modes.

=== Track lists ===
Most SingStar games for PlayStation 2 differ only in the track list contained on the game disc. SingStar games typically ship with 30 songs. Individual SingStar games are loosely based upon genres, such as rock or pop music (SingStar Rocks! and SingStar Pop respectively). SingStar games were sometimes localised for release in different regions, with customised track lists to suit foreign markets and territories. In addition, a number of non-English language SingStar games have been released exclusively in some European countries.

All SingStar games (except the original SingStar and Singalong with Disney for PlayStation 2) allow players to swap out the current disc (called the master disc) for another SingStar disc. This allows access to the songs on other versions without the need to reset the console; it also allows PS2 SingStar discs to be played on a PS3, regardless of its PS2 backwards compatibility status, by starting with a PS3 master disc. When a new disc is swapped in, the game retains the functionality and appearance of the master disc. By starting with a new version, players can swap in their old SingStar disc and experience them with the functionality and cosmetics of the master disc.

=== Network features ===
The PlayStation 3 version of SingStar introduced a number of online features, accessed through the PlayStation Network. Users were able to purchase songs online from the SingStore, allowing them to expand their current music selection. The SingStore launched with 41 songs, with further 1044 songs for download. All music videos are in standard definition, although videos were offered in high definition if possible.

My SingStar Online was the online community component of SingStar for the PlayStation 3. The idea for My SingStar Online was inspired by people uploading photos and videos of SingStar parties to websites such as Flickr and YouTube. The game could record photos and videos of players singing with the PlayStation Eye (or other compatible USB camera), then be saved to the PlayStation's HDD or uploaded to the My SingStar Online network. Users could rate each other's performances and leave comments on other people's profiles.

As of 31 January 2020, 23.59GMT, the SingStore servers were shut down. All online functionality, network features, and digital music downloads were immediately disabled.

== Releases ==
Over 70 SingStar SKUs have been released worldwide, including 16 titles in the United Kingdom and Australia, and 10 titles in North America. In addition, a number of non-English titles have been released exclusively in some European countries, including Austria, Belgium, Croatia, Germany, Spain, France, Italy, Norway, Poland, Portugal, Sweden, Finland and The Netherlands. While the majority of SingStar titles are for PlayStation 2 platform, a number were released for the PlayStation 3. A game titled SingStar Ultimate Party was also released for both PlayStation 3 and PlayStation 4. The latest title, SingStar Celebration was released for PlayStation 4 on 24 October 2017.

=== SingStar Dance and SingStar Guitar ===
Sony expanded SingStar brand with the release of SingStar Dance and SingStar Guitar. In addition to singing, the first game adds a dancing element using the PlayStation Move controller, while the second allows players to play guitar using any compatible guitar controller. Guitar was released in October 2010, while Dance was released the following month. No further titles have been released in either series. However, SingStar Dance did have a spin-off series of dancing games called DanceStar Party.

=== Free-to-play ===
In autumn 2012, SingStar was made as free-to-play, via a then-free SingStar application included in the PlayStation 3 software update. New features included the ability to use the PlayStation Eye as a microphone, and new Trophies. Songs can be played from PlayStation 2 and PlayStation 3 retail discs (but cannot be copied onto the Hard Drive), as well as songs bought from the SingStore.

PlayStation 3 firmware 4.30 was released on 24 October. This release caused some complaints, as the application icon was made mandatory for all European PlayStation 3 users, and cannot be removed from the XMB menu. Various petitions have been started in response to the new icon, but no changes had been made, except on 28 October 2014, when the XMB icon was updated. The icon still appears as of today, but can now be deleted by the user.

== Development ==
=== Initial design ===
The technology behind SingStar began as a research project into sound input by London Studio's prototyping department. The project was initially focused on developing a pitch detection system and game concepts aimed at a children's audience. Two main game concepts were developed: Songlines, a third-person adventure game in which the player would sing to unlock new environments, and SingAlong Safari, where players would complete missions by singing along with animals.

In 2003, the game underwent a direction change. The new concept featured contemporary music videos, and would use two microphones to allow for multiplayer scenarios. A prototype game was developed, which included pitch detection technology, a basic interface display, a scoring system and samples of (then unlicensed) music. The first game demonstration took place at a Team SCEE conference in Paris, featuring the songs "Wonderwall" by Oasis and "Independent Women" by Destiny's Child.

=== Hardware ===
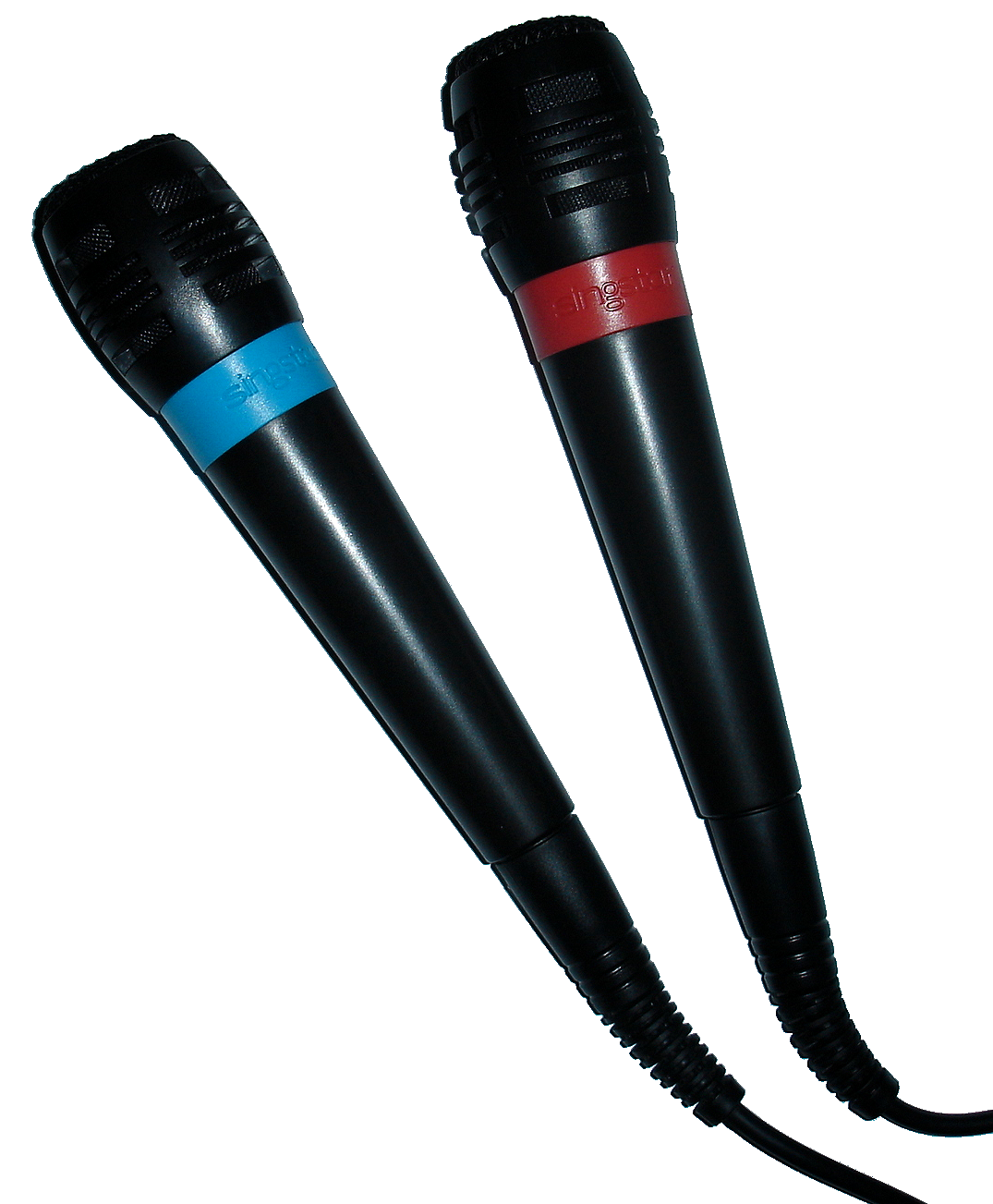
SingStar USB microphones

The SingStar games require SingStar-branded microphones – one red and one blue – which connect to the PlayStation console via a single USB converter. The USB converter was required so that both microphones would use a single USB port; the PlayStation 2 and later versions of the PlayStation 3 only have two USB ports, and the second port needed to remain free for camera functionality. The PlayStation 2 Headset was originally considered as an alternative to microphones, however the headset was not technically sufficient, and London Studio felt that handheld microphones were important to the authentic experience.

Wireless microphones, with a 2.4 GHz receiver attached to the PS2 or PS3 by USB, became available in Europe in March 2009. Bluetooth microphones were originally planned to launch with the PS3 version of SingStar, but running two Bluetooth microphones together was found to be difficult, so the PS3 game launched with the same USB microphones as the PS2 game.

From 21 May 2014, users of the PlayStation 4 could use their smartphones as a microphone. This feature was also available for the PlayStation 3 version.

=== Audio technology ===
The microphones detect pitch using digital signal processing, which analyses the frequency of the incoming signal via Fast Fourier transform. The frequency is then compared to stored information to evaluate if the note is correct. Regular singing segments do not feature speech recognition, and so humming into the microphones at the correct pitch will also score points. Rap sections use a combination of speech recognition and rhythm detection.

Tracks on the original SingStar for PlayStation 2 were mixed from master records, which allowed the artist's voice to be completely removed from the song. This feature was dropped in subsequent games because the requirement for master tracks would have restricted the studio's choice of songs. SingStar for PlayStation 3 introduced the ability to digitally suppress vocals, using ADRess (Azimuth Discrimination and Resynthesis) technology developed by Dan Barry at the Audio Research Group, based in the Dublin Institute of Technology. The ADRess settings vary for each track, and the technology is able to successfully remove the vocal tracks from 80% of songs.

The PlayStation 3 version also includes various VST plugins developed by Sound Forge, adapted to run natively on the console. The input signal undergoes a vocal signal chain which includes high-pass filter, wave hammer compressor and a reverb with a 1.2 second decay. Users are able to control the audio processing during playback, adding features such as pitch shifting.

=== PlayStation Home ===
In September 2009, London Studio launched a themed space in the PlayStation 3's online community-based service, PlayStation Home. The space is called "The SingStar Rooms" and featured a dance floor, a jukebox, and different rewards for the users. It was available to the European and North American versions of PlayStation Home.

There was also a VIP Room used for events. The first event was for the UK rapper Dizzee Rascal, a Mercury Award Winner, and occurred from 24 September to 9 October. Dizzee performed for the PS Home/SingStar community and answered questions for an hour after the performance. There were also limited time items at this space like a Dizzee Mask. This was available to the European and North American versions of PlayStation Home, however, Dizzee only appeared in the European version to answer questions.

The VIP Room reopened on 17 December 2009 until 14 January 2010 for Christmas with a new mini-game and a reward.

== Marketing ==
The SingStar series has been promoted through a number of advertising platforms, including television and cinema, print and digital advertising. SingStar advertisements are designed to convey the social aspects of the game. The advertisement for the PAL release SingStar Rocks! features two men singing Song 2 by Blur on a public rooftop, while onlookers watch in surprise. Tony McTear, creative director of the advert, said that "the commercial really captures the spirit of the game". Similar style advertisements were created for the American launch of SingStar Rocks!, which feature public performances in a mall, a subway, and a fire escape.

In September 2006, SingStar took part in a television sponsorship deal with MTV in the United Kingdom. SingStar sponsored MTV's Throwdown program, which consisted of a 3-minute clip of viewers lip syncing to a song. Viewers were requested to upload a video of themselves singing to the SingStar-branded MTV Flux website, with a compilation of the most viewed videos being shown on Throwdown. The campaign ran until February 2007, and resulted in a 15% boost in SingStar sales.

In 2009 during the airing of Australian Idol in Australia Singstar was advertised every time the show aired.

In 2012 Julian Hill became A Guinness World record holder for his 24 hours 23 minutes continuous play of SingStar games. This charity Event, Known as 'SingStar The Endurance Challenge' raised over £3,000 for Great Ormond Street Children's Hospital, and made Julian Hill an Internet Celebrity.

SingStar's advertising campaigns have targeted a variety of demographics typically ignored by the gaming industry. The games have received coverage in women's and girls' magazines, including Heat and Harpers and Queen in the United Kingdom. In 2004, Sony PlayStation launched its first online advertising campaign targeted towards teenage girls, and in 2006 ran an advertisement in Attitude targeted towards gay males.

== Reception ==
Aggregate Reviews
Game	Game Rankings	MetaCritic
SingStar	84%	82/100
SingStar Party	74%	77/100
SingStar Pop	76%	74/100
SingStar '80s	UK: 79% US: 78%	78/100
SingStar Rocks!	71%	71/100
SingStar Anthems	63%	65/100
SingStar Legends	78%	78/100
SingStar Pop Hits	79%	77/100
SingStar '90s	74%	73/100
SingStar Amped	78%	76/100
SingStar Rock Ballads	73%	73/100
SingStar R&B PT 1	70%	70/100
SingStar R&B PT 2	73%	74/100
SingStar Summer Party	74%	73/100
SingStar Hottest Hits	76%	79/100
SingStar BoyBands vs GirlBands	79%	78/100
SingStar ABBA (PS2)	70%	65/100
SingStar Singalong with Disney	68%	69/100
SingStar Queen (PS2)	76%	76/100
SingStar Vol. 1 (PS3)	83%	82/100
SingStar Vol. 2 (PS3)	81%	80/100
SingStar Vol. 3 (PS3)	70%	65/100
SingStar ABBA (PS3)	68%	69/100
SingStar Queen (PS3)	77%	76/100
SingStar Pop Edition (PS3)	75%	72/100
Singstar Motown (PS2)	83%	81/100

The SingStar series has been largely successful in Europe and Australia, and has collectively sold over 16 million units in the PAL region, and an additional 1.5 million units in the United States. Over 4 million songs have been downloaded from the online SingStore. In 2005, SingStar and SingStar Party jointly received the award for originality at the BAFTA Games Awards. The 2017 game SingStar Celebration was nominated for "Best Family/Social Game" at the 2017 Titanium Awards, and for "Family Game of the Year" at the 21st Annual D.I.C.E. Awards.

=== Critical reception ===
The first SingStar game was well received by gaming critics. Eurogamer described it as the "definitive social game", and commented that the game was "buffed, polished and arranged to generate the maximum degree of entertainment". They did however criticise the scoring system for occasionally getting out of sync with the song. Australian website PALGN described the single-player as "a little lacklustre", but praised the multiplayer component as "the best asset of SingStar" and described the game as "addictive".

SingStar debuted in the US with the release of SingStar Rocks!, where it was compared against the Karaoke Revolution series. IGN criticised the lack of ability to remove the artists vocals, and said that the use of original music videos "hurt the ability to really get lost in the song". They also described SingStar's interface as a "crude hacked together system" compared to the scrolling timeline interface of Karaoke Revolution. 1UP criticised the lack of character generation, rewards and unlockable features, and said SingStar "[lacks] the 'game' feel of Karaoke Revolution".

A number of PlayStation 2 titles have offered additional gameplay features. The duet mode added in SingStar Party was described as "hit and miss [with some songs split] into 'fun bits' and 'boring bits' seemingly on purpose". The rapping segments introduced in SingStar Pop were described as "the hardest parts of the entire game", and were a feature which added variety to the series. SingStar Pop also introduced Medleys, which consist of a random combination of song choruses. The new medleys were described as "funny to watch, and intense to play", although potentially frustrating.

The main difference between PlayStation 2 SingStar titles is the track list contained on the game disc. Some SingStar track lists have been better received than others. Eurogamer described the UK track list for SingStar Legends as "simultaneously eclectic and fantastic", whereas SingStar Pop Hits felt like "a loosely thrown together collection of what the charts say is cool, with little regard for what will make for a fun karaoke party". The localisation of some SingStar games also has played a part in their reception; PALGN praised the localised Australian content in SingStar Rocks!, whereas it panned SingStar Pop Hits (which featured an almost identical track list to the UK release), saying that it had songs few Australians had ever heard of.

The Academy of Interactive Arts & Sciences nominated SingStar Rocks! for "Outstanding Achievement in Soundtrack" at the 10th Annual Interactive Achievement Awards.

== See also ==
- Karaoke
- Karaoke Revolution
- Lips
- UltraStar - An open source clone of the SingStar engine
