= SingStar Guitar =

2010 video game

- European cover art
- Developer: London Studio
- Publisher: Sony Computer Entertainment
- Series: SingStar
- Platform: PlayStation 3
- Release: EU: 15 October 2010; AU: 4 November 2010
- Genre: Music
- Modes: Single-player, multiplayer

SingStar Guitar is a 2010 music video game developed by London Studio and published by Sony Computer Entertainment for the PlayStation 3. It is a spin-off of the karaoke SingStar series. It allows the use of a third-party guitar controller such as those used in the Guitar Hero or Rock Band series.

== Music ==
=== On-disc ===
The German and Spain editions of the game include some localized material. All of the in game mixes were done from original multi-tracks. The mixing work was done by a music production company in the UK, Nimrod Productions.

The following track list is the line-up of music included in the release of SingStar Guitar: Country of release is indicated by two-letter country codes. For titles localized in multiple markets, songs are either indicated as present ("Yes") or absent ("No") in the track list for each localized version.

Artist	Song	UK	DE	ES	AU
3 Doors Down	"Kryptonite"	Yes	Yes	No	Yes
Ariel Rot	"Dos de Corazones"	No	No	Yes	No
Auletta	"Meine Stadt"	No	Yes	No	No
Barricada	"En Blanco y Negro"	No	No	Yes	No
Bloc Party	"Helicopter"	Yes	Yes	No	Yes
Blur	"Song 2"	Yes	Yes	Yes	Yes
Buzzcocks	"Ever Fallen in Love with Someone"	Yes	No	No	Yes
Choirboys	"Run to Paradise"	No	No	No	Yes
Christina y los Subterráneos	"Voy en un Coche"	No	No	Yes	No
Colbie Caillat	"Bubbly"	Yes	Yes	No	Yes
David Bowie	"The Man Who Sold the World"	Yes	Yes	No	Yes
Despistaos	"Cada Dos Minutos"	No	No	Yes	No
Die Toten Hosen	"Ertrinken"	No	Yes	No	No
Dover	"DJ"	No	No	Yes	No
Duncan Dhu	"En Algún Lugar"	No	No	Yes	No
Elbow	"Grounds for Divorce"	Yes	Yes	No	No
El Canto del Loco	"La Suerte de Mi Vida"	No	No	Yes	No
Eskimo Joe	"From the Sea"	No	No	No	Yes
Estopa	"Malabares"	No	No	Yes	No
Fito & Fitipaldis	"Antes de que Cuente Diez"	No	No	Yes	No
Florence and the Machine	"Kiss with a Fist"	Yes	No	No	Yes
Franz Ferdinand	"No You Girls"	Yes	Yes	No	Yes
Héroes del Silencio	"Avalancha"	No	No	Yes	No
Hombres G	"Suéltate el Pelo"	No	No	Yes	No
Ich + Ich	"Pflaster"	No	Yes	No	No
Jamiroquai	"Too Young to Die"	Yes	Yes	No	No
Jennifer Rostock	"Kopf oder Zahl"	No	Yes	No	No
Joaquín Sabina	"La del Pirata Cojo"	No	No	Yes	No
Kaiser Chiefs	"I Predict a Riot"	Yes	Yes	Yes	Yes
Kasabian	"Fire"	Yes	Yes	No	Yes
Keith Urban	"Days Go By"	No	No	No	Yes
KT Tunstall	"Suddenly I See"	Yes	Yes	No	No
Ladyhawke	"My Delirium"	Yes	No	No	Yes
La Fuga	"No Solo Respirar"	No	No	Yes	No
Los Piratas	"Mi Matadero Clandestino"	No	No	Yes	No
Los Rodríguez	"Milonga del Marinero y el Capitán"	No	No	Yes	No
Los Secretos	"Déjame (Versión Homenaje)"	No	No	Yes	No
Madsen	"Lass die Lieben Regieren"	No	Yes	No	No
Marea	"Petenera"	No	No	Yes	No
Muse	"Supermassive Black Hole"	Yes	Yes	Yes	Yes
Nacha Pop	"Chica de Ayer (Versión Estudio)"	No	No	Yes	No
Paramore	"crushcrushcrush"	Yes	No	No	Yes
Pereza	"Niña de Papá"	No	No	Yes	No
Pixies	"Debaser"	Yes	No	No	Yes
Platero y Tú	"Alucinante"	No	No	Yes	No
Pulp	"Disco 2000"	Yes	Yes	No	Yes
Queen & David Bowie	"Under Pressure"	Yes	Yes	Yes	Yes
Revolverheld	"Spinner"	No	Yes	No	No
Sidonie	"El Incendio"	No	No	Yes	No
Sôber	"Diez Años"	No	No	Yes	No
Stereophonics	"Just Looking"	Yes	Yes	No	Yes
The Angels	"Take a Long Line"	No	No	No	Yes
The Bosshoss	"Go! Go! Go!"	No	Yes	No	No
The Clash	"Rock the Casbah"	Yes	Yes	Yes	Yes
The Cult	"She Sells Sanctuary"	Yes	Yes	Yes	Yes
The Cure	"The Lovecats"	Yes	Yes	No	No
The Living End	"Prisoner of Society"	No	No	No	Yes
The Raconteurs	"Steady, As She Goes"	Yes	Yes	No	Yes
The Stone Roses	"Waterfall"	Yes	No	No	Yes
The Veronicas	"Untouched"	Yes	No	No	Yes
The White Stripes	"Fell In Love With A Girl"	Yes	Yes	No	Yes
The Wrights	"Evie Part 1 (Let Your Hair Hang Down)"	No	No	No	Yes
Tina Turner	"Steamy Windows"	Yes	Yes	No	No
Tokio Hotel	"Automatisch"	No	Yes	No	No
U2	"Beautiful Day"	Yes	Yes	Yes	Yes
Vampire Weekend	"A-Punk"	Yes	No	Yes	No

=== Downloadable content ===
The following songs in the SingStore have "Guitar add-ons" available:

Artist	Song	Release date
Bloc Party	"Banquet"	20 Oct 2010
Hoobastank	"The Reason" (original version)	20 Oct 2010
Kaiser Chiefs	"Ruby"	20 Oct 2010
Maxïmo Park	"Apply Some Pressure"	20 Oct 2010
Stereophonics	"The Bartender and the Thief"	20 Oct 2010
The Police	"Don't Stand So Close to Me"	20 Oct 2010
The Script	"The Man Who Can't Be Moved"	20 Oct 2010
The Temper Trap	"Sweet Disposition"	20 Oct 2010
Wings	"Band on the Run"	20 Oct 2010
David Bowie	"Jean Genie"	03 Nov 2010
Fall Out Boy	"This Aint A Scene, It's An Arms Race"	03 Nov 2010
The Stone Roses	"She Bangs The Drums"	03 Nov 2010
Placebo	"Nancy Boy"	17 Nov 2010
Texas	"Say What You Want"	17 Nov 2010
Kasabian	"Club Foot"	01 Dec 2010
Orson	"No Tomorrow"	01 Dec 2010
OneRepublic	"Stop And Stare"	01 Dec 2010
Feeder	"Buck Rogers"	15 Dec 2010
Franz Ferdinand	"Take Me Out"	15 Dec 2010
Motörhead	"Ace of Spades"	15 Dec 2010
Pulp	"Common People"	15 Dec 2010
Snow Patrol	"Chasing Cars"	15 Dec 2010
T.Rex	"20th Century Boy"	15 Dec 2010
Tears For Fears	"Everybody Wants To Rule The World"	15 Dec 2010
The Fratellis	"Chelsea Dagger"	15 Dec 2010
The Killers	"When You Were Young"	15 Dec 2010
Travis	"Sing"	15 Dec 2010
Wet Wet Wet	"Love Is All Around"	15 Dec 2010
Blur	"Beetlebum"	05 Jan 2011
Maroon 5	"This Love"	05 Jan 2011
Razorlight	"America"	05 Jan 2011
Fall Out Boy	"Thnks Fr Th Mmrs"	19 Jan 2011
4 Non Blondes	"What's Up?"	19 Jan 2011
No Doubt	"Don't Speak"	19 Jan 2011
Maroon 5	"Makes Me Wonder"	02 Feb 2011
The Hold Steady	"Stay Positive"	02 Feb 2011
Blondie	"Call Me"	16 Feb 2011
Robert Palmer	"Addicted To Love"	16 Feb 2011
Blind Melon	"No Rain"	02 Mar 2011
Adele	"Chasing Pavements"	02 Mar 2011
Pixies	"Here Comes Your Man"	16 Mar 2011
Baby Bird	"You're Gorgeous"	30 Mar 2011
David Bowie	"Starman"	30 Mar 2011
