= Everybody Dance (video game) =

2011 video game

- Developer: London Studio
- Publisher: Sony Computer Entertainment
- Platform: PlayStation 3
- Release: NA: 18 October 2011; EU: 21 October 2011
- Genres: Music, Exercise
- Modes: Single-player, multiplayer

Everybody Dance (known as DanceStar Party in Europe) is a 2011 dance video game developed by London Studio and published by Sony Computer Entertainment for the PlayStation 3. It is a spin-off of the game SingStar Dance, which was also developed by London Studio. Like that game, this game utilizes the PlayStation Move controller for dancing.

A sequel, Everybody Dance 2 (DanceStar Party Hits in Europe) was released in 2012, and a second sequel, Everybody Dance 3, was released in 2013 exclusively in Latin America. That year, Sony Competitive Entertainment also released Everybody Dance Digital (DanceStar Digital in Europe), an otherwise free-to-play title which contained no pre-included songs; songs were instead purchased in Packs ("Mixes" in Europe) of four, much in the same manner as DLC songs in the three main games (there was also a Demo Pack which could be purchased for free).

== Music ==
Everybody Dance / DanceStar Party

Song	Artist	NA	UK	ES	DE
Tribal Dance	2 Unlimited	No	No	No	Yes
Mr. Saxobeat	Alexandra Stan	No	No	Yes	No
1 Thing	Amerie	Yes	Yes	Yes	Yes
You're the First, the Last, My Everything	Barry White	Yes	Yes	No	Yes
Where's Your Head At	Basement Jaxx	Yes	Yes	Yes	Yes
Dancing With Myself	Generation X	Yes	Yes	Yes	Yes
I Like the Way	Bodyrockers	Yes	Yes	Yes	Yes
Girls Beautiful	Bullmeister	No	No	No	Yes
Abrázame Muy Fuerte	Bustamante	No	No	Yes	No
Kung Fu Fighting	Carl Douglas	Yes	Yes	No	Yes
Lead the Way	Carlos Jean ft. Electric Nana	No	No	Yes	No
Finally	CeCe Peniston	Yes	Yes	Yes	Yes
Hey Boy Hey Girl	The Chemical Brothers	Yes	Yes	Yes	Yes
Night by Night	Chromeo	Yes	Yes	Yes	No
Mr. Vain	Culture Beat	No	No	No	Yes
Hood Pass Intact	Dam-Funk	Yes	No	No	No
Silencio	David Bisbal	No	No	Yes	No
Hot Summer Night (Oh La La La)	David Tavaré ft. 2 Eivissa	No	No	Yes	No
Ghosts 'N' Stuff	Deadmau5	Yes	Yes	No	No
Upside Down	Diana Ross	Yes	Yes	No	Yes
It's My Life	Dr. Alban	No	No	No	Yes
Barbra Streisand	Duck Sauce	Yes	Yes	Yes	Yes
Starry Eyed	Ellie Goulding	Yes	Yes	Yes	Yes
I'm Still Standing	Elton John	Yes	Yes	No	Yes
Kickstarts	Example	No	Yes	Yes	Yes
Praise You	Fatboy Slim	Yes	No	No	No
Everybody's Free	Global Deejays ft. Rozalla	No	No	No	Yes
Superstylin'	Groove Armada	Yes	No	No	No
I See You Baby (Fatboy Slim Remix)	Groove Armada ft. Gram'ma Funk	No	Yes	Yes	Yes
Let Me Think About It	Ida Corr vs. Fedde Le Grand	Yes	Yes	Yes	Yes
Lust for Life	Iggy Pop	No	Yes	No	No
Down	Jay Sean ft. Li'l Wayne	Yes	Yes	Yes	Yes
Do It Like a Dude	Jessie J	No	Yes	Yes	Yes
Bailando por Ahí	Juan Magán	No	No	Yes	No
One Piece of Tape	Kim Petras	No	No	No	Yes
Get Down on It	Kool and the Gang	Yes	Yes	No	Yes
Born This Way	Lady Gaga	Yes	Yes	Yes	No
Satellite	Lena	No	No	No	Yes
Party Rock Anthem	LMFAO	Yes	Yes	Yes	Yes
Macarena (Bayside Boys Mix)	Los del Río	No	Yes	No	Yes
Dance With Somebody	Mando Diao	No	No	No	Yes
Pump Up the Volume	M/A/R/R/S	Yes	No	No	No
Dr. Beat	Miami Sound Machine	Yes	Yes	Yes	Yes
You Got It (The Right Stuff)	New Kids on the Block	Yes	Yes	Yes	No
Don't Hold Your Breath	Nicole Scherzinger	Yes	Yes	Yes	No
Here it Goes Again	Ok Go	Yes	Yes	Yes	No
The Way You Move	OutKast	Yes	Yes	Yes	Yes
Addicted to Bass	Puretone	Yes	No	No	No
Radio	Raphael Saadiq	Yes	No	No	No
Ready to Go	Republica	Yes	Yes	Yes	Yes
Más	Ricky Martin	No	No	Yes	No
Rude Boy	Rihanna	Yes	Yes	Yes	Yes
Step in the Name of Love	R. Kelly	Yes	No	No	No
Sick of Love	Robert Ramírez	No	No	Yes	No
The Power	Snap!	Yes	Yes	Yes	No
Dreamer	Soraya	No	No	Yes	No
Santeria	Sublime	Yes	No	No	No
Heaven Must Be Missing an Angel	Tavares	No	Yes	No	Yes
C'Mon (Catch 'Em By Surprise)	Tiësto vs. Diplo ft. Busta Rhymes	Yes	Yes	Yes	No
Pass Out	Tinie Tempah	Yes	Yes	Yes	Yes
DJ Got Us Falling in Love	Usher ft. Pitbull	Yes	Yes	Yes	Yes
OMG	Usher ft. will.i.am	Yes	Yes	Yes	Yes
We Like to Party (The Vengabus)	Vengaboys	No	Yes	Yes	No
Whip My Hair	Willow Smith	Yes	Yes	Yes	Yes
We No Speak Americano	Yolanda Be Cool vs. DCUP	No	Yes	Yes	Yes

Everybody Dance 2 / DanceStar Party Hits

Song	Artist	LA	UK	ES	DE
Get Ready For This	2 Unlimited	Yes	No	No	No
Happiness	Alexis Jordan	No	No	No	Yes
I Need a Dollar	Aloe Blacc	Yes	Yes	Yes	Yes
Geronimo	Aura Dione	No	No	No	Yes
Levels	Avicii	Yes	Yes	Yes	Yes
What the Hell	Avril Lavigne	Yes	Yes	Yes	Yes
Romeo	Basement Jaxx ft. Kele Le Roc and Corryne Dwyer	Yes	Yes	Yes	Yes
Fun Fun Fun	The Beach Boys	Yes	Yes	Yes	Yes
Rasputin	Boney M.	Yes	Yes	Yes	Yes
No Hay 2 Sin 3	Cali y El Dandee ft. David Bisbal	No	No	Yes	No
Bounce	Calvin Harris ft. Kelis	Yes	Yes	Yes	No
Gimme the Base	Carlos Jean ft. M-AND-Y	No	No	Yes	No
Evacuate the Dancefloor	Cascada	No	No	No	Yes
With Ur Love	Cher Lloyd ft. Mike Posner	Yes	Yes	No	No
Fight For This Love	Cheryl Cole	Yes	Yes	Yes	Yes
Beautiful People	Chris Brown ft. Benny Benassi	Yes	Yes	Yes	Yes
Hamma	Culcha Candela	No	No	No	Yes
Bass Down Low	Dev ft. The Cataracts	Yes	Yes	No	Yes
Dance wiv Me	Dizzee Rascal ft. Calvin Harris and Chrome	Yes	Yes	Yes	Yes
Gold Dust	DJ Fresh	Yes	Yes	Yes	Yes
Zeig mir wie Du tanzt	Frida Gold	No	No	No	Yes
Echt	Glasperlesenspiel	No	No	No	Yes
Hollaback Girl	Gwen Stefani	Yes	Yes	Yes	Yes
2012 (It Ain't the End)	Jay Sean ft. Nicki Minaj	Yes	Yes	Yes	No
Who's Laughing Now?	Jessie J	Yes	Yes	Yes	Yes
She Makes Me Wanna	JLS ft. Dev	Yes	Yes	No	Yes
Love is in the Air	John Paul Young	Yes	Yes	Yes	No
Rayos de Sol	José de Rico and Henry Méndez	No	No	Yes	No
No Sigue Modas	Juan Magán	No	No	Yes	No
Elektrisches Gefühl	Juli	No	No	No	Yes
Lambada	Kaoma	Yes	Yes	Yes	Yes
Get Down Tonight	KC and the Sunshine Band	No	Yes	No	No
Trick Me	Kelis	Yes	Yes	Yes	Yes
Stronger (What Doesn't Kill You)	Kelly Clarkson	Yes	Yes	Yes	Yes
Earthquake	Labrinth ft. Tinie Tempah	Yes	Yes	Yes	Yes
The Edge of Glory	Lady Gaga	Yes	Yes	Yes	Yes
Soy Yo	Marta Sánchez	No	No	Yes	No
Paper Planes	M. I. A.	Yes	Yes	Yes	Yes
Maneater	Nelly Furtado	Yes	Yes	Yes	Yes
Super Bass	Nicki Minaj	Yes	Yes	Yes	Yes
What Makes You Beautiful	One Direction	Yes	Yes	Yes	Yes
La Niña que Llora en Tus Fiestas	La Oreja de Van Gogh	No	No	Yes	No
Opposites Attract	Paula Abdul ft. The Wild Pair	Yes	Yes	Yes	Yes
Boys and Girls	Pixie Lott	Yes	Yes	Yes	Yes
Buttons	The Pussycat Dolls	Yes	Yes	Yes	Yes
I Like to Move It	Reel 2 Reel ft. The Mad Stuntman	Yes	Yes	Yes	Yes
Mama Do the Hump	Rizzle Kicks	Yes	Yes	No	Yes
It's Tricky	Run DMC	Yes	Yes	Yes	Yes
Loca People	Sak Noel. ft. Esthera Sarita	Yes	Yes	Yes	Yes
Push It	Salt 'N' Pepa	Yes	Yes	Yes	Yes
Naturally	Selena Gomez and the Scene	Yes	Yes	Yes	Yes
Break Your Heart	Taio Cruz	Yes	Yes	Yes	No
The Key The Secret	Urban Cookie Collective	Yes	Yes	Yes	No
Glad You Came	The Wanted	Yes	Yes	Yes	Yes
Buy the DJ a Round	Xuso Jones	No	No	Yes	No

Everybody Dance 3

Song	Artist	Original Game
Tribal Dance	2 Unlimited	DanceStar Party
Candy	Aggro Santos ft. Kimberly Wyatt	Pack 13
Larger than Life	Backstreet Boys	Pack 10
Walk Like an Egyptian	The Bangles	Pack 4
Girls Beautiful	Bullmeister	DanceStar Party
Word Up!	Cameo	Pack 1
Gimme the Base	Carlos Jean ft. M-AND-Y	DanceStar Party Hits
Brick House	The Commodores	Pack 5
Gypsy Woman (She’s Homeless) (La Da Dee La Da Da)	Crystal Waters	Pack 6
Mr. Vain	Culture Beat	DanceStar Party
Jean Genie	David Bowie	Pack 1
Come On Eileen	Dexys Midnight Runners	Pack 7
Days Go By	Dirty Vegas	Pack 5
Street Tuff	Double Trouble & The Rebel MC	Pack 8
It’s My Life	Dr. Alban	DanceStar Party
Rio	Duran Duran	Pack 3
Guns & Horses	Ellie Goulding	Pack 11
Outta Here	Esmée Denters	Pack 3
Take Me Out	Franz Ferdinand	Pack 2
Everybody’s Free	Global Deejays ft. Rozalla	DanceStar Party
I See You Baby (Fatboy Slim Remix)	Groove Armada ft. Gram’ma Funk	DanceStar Party
Bailando Por Ahí	Juan Magán	DanceStar Party
One Piece of Tape	Kim Petras	DanceStar Party
Macarena (Bayside Boys Mix)	Los Del Río	DanceStar Party
Dance With Somebody	Mando Diao	DanceStar Party
Soy Yo	Marta Sánchez	DanceStar Party Hits
Dancing in the Street	Martha Reeves & The Vandellas	Pack 3
Sing it Back	Moloko	Pack 2
Movin’ On Up	M-People	Pack 6
La Niña que Llora en tus Fiestas	La Oreja de Van Gogh	DanceStar Party Hits
Sick of Love	Robert Ramírez	DanceStar Party
(Hey You) The Rock Steady Crew	Rock Steady Crew	Pack 4
Tainted Love	Soft Cell	Pack 14
Keep On Movin’	Soul II Soul ft. Caron Wheeler	Pack 7
Heaven Must be Missing an Angel	Tavares	DanceStar Party
Adagio for Strings	Tiësto	Pack 13
Creep	TLC	Pack 6
We Like to Party (The Vengabus)	Vengaboys	DanceStar Party
Unorthodox	Wretch 32 ft. Example	Pack 4
Buy the DJ a Round	Xuso Jones	DanceStar Party Hits

DLC Pack / Mix 1

Released October 19, 2011

Song	Artist	Original Game
Daddy Cool (Jewels & Stone Edit)	Boney M.	Pack 1
Word Up!	Cameo	Pack 1
Jean Genie	David Bowie	Pack 1
Never Gonna Gove You Up	Rick Astley	Pack 1

DLC Pack / Mix 2

Released October 19, 2011

Song	Artist	Original Game
Video Killed the Radio Star	The Buggles	Pack 2
Take Me Out	Franz Ferdinand	Pack 2
Dreamer	Livin' Joy	Pack 2
Sing it Back	Moloko	Pack 2

DLC Pack / Mix 3

Released November 16, 2011

Song	Artist	Original Game
Rio	Duran Duran	Pack 3
Outta Here	Esmée Denters	Pack 3
Dancing in the Street	Martha Reeves & The Vandellas	Pack 3
5, 6, 7, 8	Steps	Pack 3

DLC Pack / Mix 4

Released December 13, 2011

Song	Artist	Original Game
Walk Like an Egyptian	The Bangles	Pack 4
Hey You (Rock Steady Crew)	Rock Steady Crew	Pack 4
ABC	The Jackson 5	Pack 4
Unorthodox	Wretch 32 ft. Example	Pack 4

DLC Pack / Mix 5

Released December 13, 2011

Song	Artist	Original Game
I Think We’re Alone Now	Tiffany	Pack 5
Achy Breaky Heart	Billy Ray Cyrus	Pack 5
Days Go By	Dirty Vegas	Pack 5
Brick House	The Commodores	Pack 5

DLC Pack / Mix 6

Released January 11, 2012

Song	Artist	Original Game
Where Love Lives	Alison Limerick	Pack 6
Gypsy Woman (She’s Homeless)	Crystal Waters	Pack 6
Movin’ on Up	M-People	Pack 6
Creep	TLC	Pack 6

DLC Pack / Mix 7

Released February 14, 2012

Song	Artist	Original Game
Come On Eileen	Dexys Midnight Runners	Pack 7
Changed the Way You Kiss Me	Example	Pack 7
Going Back to My Roots	Odyssey	Pack 7
Keep On Movin'	Soul II Soul ft. Caron Wheeler	Pack 7

DLC Pack / Mix 8

Released March 20, 2012

Song	Artist	Original Game
Street Tuff	Double Trouble and the Rebel MC	Pack 8
Electric Boogie	Marcia Griffiths	Pack 8
Upside Down	Paloma Faith	Pack 8
Badman Riddim (Jump)	Vato Gonzales ft. Foreign Beggars	Pack 8

DLC Pack / Mix 9

Released February 12, 2013

Song	Artist	Original Game
What the Hell	Avril Lavigne	DanceStar Party Hits
No Sigue Modas	Juan Magán	DanceStar Party Hits
I Like to Move It	Reel II Reel ft. The Mad Stuntman	DanceStar Party Hits
Push It	Salt ‘N’ Pepa	DanceStar Party Hits

DLC Pack / Mix 10

Released February 12, 2013

Song	Artist	Original Game
Larger than Life	Backstreet Boys	Pack 10
Bass Down Low	Dev ft. The Cataracs	DanceStar Party Hits
Let Me Think About It	Ida Corr ft. Fedde Le Grand	DanceStar Party
Bailando Por Ahí	Juan Magán	DanceStar Party

DLC Pack / Mix 11

Released February 12, 2013

Song	Artist	Original Game
I Need a Dollar	Aloe Blacc	DanceStar Party Hits
Bingo Bango	Basement Jaxx	Pack 11
Guns & Horses	Ellie Goulding	Pack 11
It’s Tricky	Run DMC	DanceStar Party Hits

DLC Pack / Mix 12

Released April 2, 2013

Song	Artist	Original Game
2 Times	Ann Lee	Pack 12
Rasputin	Boney M.	DanceStar Party Hits
Rayos de Sol	José de Rico & Henry Mendez	DanceStar Party Hits
Paper Planes	M.I.A.	DanceStar Party Hits

DLC Pack / Mix 13

Released April 2, 2013

Song	Artist	Original Game
Candy	Aggro Santos ft. Kimberly Wyatt	Pack 13
Who’s Laughing Now?	Jessie J	DanceStar Party Hits
Adagio for Strings	Tiësto	Pack 13
Buttons	The Pussycat Dolls	DanceStar Party Hits

DLC Pack / Mix 14

Released April 2, 2013

Song	Artist	Original Game
Romeo	Basement Jaxx	DanceStar Party Hits
Hollaback Girl	Gwen Stefani	DanceStar Party Hits
Lambada	Kaoma	DanceStar Party Hits
Tainted Love	Soft Cell	Pack 14

DLC Pack / Mix 15

Released May 7, 2013

Song	Artist	Original Game
Starry Eyed	Ellie Goulding	DanceStar Party
With Ur Love	Cher Lloyd ft. Mike Posner	DanceStar Party Hits
Get Down On it	Kool & The Gang	DanceStar Party
Whip My Hair	Willow Smith	DanceStar Party

DLC Pack / Mix 16

Released May 7, 2013

Song	Artist	Original Game
Maneater	Nelly Furtado	DanceStar Party Hits
You Got It (The Right Stuff)	New Kids on the Block	DanceStar Party
Levels	Avicii	DanceStar Party Hits
Bounce	Calvin Harris ft. Kelis Rogers	DanceStar Party Hits

DLC Pack / Mix 17

Released July 2, 2013

Song	Artist	Original Game
The Way You Move	OutKast	DanceStar Party
Kickstarts	Example	DanceStar Party
Satellite	Lena Meyer-Landrut	DanceStar Party
All Fired Up	The Saturdays	Pack 17

== Reception ==
Reception

Aggregate score
Aggregator	Score
Metacritic	66/100

Review score
Publication	Score
IGN	6.5/10

Everybody Dance received mixed reviews from critics upon release. On Metacritic, the game holds a score of 66/100 based on 5 reviews. Ryan Clements of IGN gave the game a 6.5/10 score, praising its gameplay and multiplayer, but criticising its score-based system.
