= SingStar Queen =

2009 video game

- Developer: London Studio
- Publisher: Sony Computer Entertainment
- Platforms: PlayStation 2, PlayStation 3
- Release: AU: 19 March 2009; EU: 20 March 2009; NA: 4 August 2009
- Genre: Karaoke
- Modes: Single-player, multiplayer

SingStar Queen is a 2009 music video game developed by London Studio and published by Sony Computer Entertainment for the PlayStation 3 and PlayStation 2. The game features the music of rock band Queen.

== Gameplay ==
SingStar games require players to sing along with music in order to score points. Players interface with their console via SingStar USB microphones while a music video plays in the background. The pitch players are required to sing is displayed as horizontal grey bars, which function similar to a musical stave, with corresponding lyrics displayed at the bottom of the screen. The game analyses a player's pitch and compares it to the original track, with players scoring points based on how accurate their singing is. Different modes of SingStar may vary this basic pattern, but the principle is similar throughout.

SingStar includes a variety of game modes. The standard singing mode allows one or two people to sing simultaneously, either competitively or in a duet.

The PlayStation 3 version of the game supports trophies, however, older versions of the game will need to go online to get the latest patch. Future SingStar games will include the trophy patched game on the SingStar disc.

== Track list ==
No.	Title	Length
1.	"Killer Queen (Note: Not on the PS2 Version of the game.)"
2.	"You're My Best Friend"
3.	"Bohemian Rhapsody"
4.	"Tie Your Mother Down"
5.	"Somebody To Love"
6.	"We Will Rock You"
7.	"We Are The Champions"
8.	"Fat Bottomed Girls"
9.	"Bicycle Race (Note: In the US version of the game, this song is replaced with Save Me.)"
10.	"Don't Stop Me Now"
11.	"Another One Bites The Dust"
12.	"Crazy Little Thing Called Love"
13.	"Play the Game"
14.	"Under Pressure"
15.	"Radio Ga Ga"
16.	"I Want To Break Free"
17.	"Hammer To Fall"
18.	"One Vision"
19.	"A Kind Of Magic"
20.	"Who Wants To Live Forever"
21.	"I Want It All"
22.	"Breakthru"
23.	"Innuendo"
24.	"These Are The Days Of Our Lives"
25.	"The Show Must Go On"
Total length:		?

== Reception ==
Reception

Aggregate score
Aggregator	Score	
Aggregator	PS2	PS3
Metacritic	73/100	74/100

Review scores
Publication	Score	
Publication	PS2	PS3
GameSpot	N/A	7.5/10
GameZone	N/A	7.8/10
IGN	N/A	5.5/10
PlayStation Official Magazine – Australia	N/A	7/10
PlayStation Official Magazine – UK	N/A	8/10
PALGN	N/A	7/10
PlayStation: The Official Magazine	N/A	4/5
PSM3	N/A	70%

The game received "average" reviews on both platforms according to the review aggregation website Metacritic.
