= EyePet =

2009 video game

- European box art
- Developers: London Studio; Spiral House (PSP)
- Publisher: Sony Computer Entertainment
- Composers: Alastair Lindsay; Richard Jacques; Jim Fowler; Jonathan van den Wijngaarden
- Platforms: PlayStation 3 PlayStation Portable
- Release: EU: 23 October 2009; AU: 29 October 2009; Move: NA: 5 September 2010; EU: 17 September 2010; JP: 21 October 2010; PlayStation Portable: NA: 2 November 2010; AU: 4 November 2010; EU: 5 November 2010
- Genre: Virtual pet
- Mode: Single-player

EyePet is a 2009 virtual pet video game developed by London Studio and published by Sony Computer Entertainment for the PlayStation 3. The original version was originally scheduled to be released in North America on 17 November 2009, but was held back. Instead, a newer version of EyePet adapted for the PlayStation Move motion control system was released in North America on 5 September 2010, where it is available in a bundle. In October 2010, the Move-adapted version was released in Japan and Europe, with the European edition entitled EyePet Move Edition. The game also supports 3D on 3D-enabled TVs. A port to the PlayStation Portable developed by Spiral House was released on 2 November 2010.

The game uses the camera to allow the titular virtual pet to interact with people and objects in the real world. Using augmented reality, the gremlin-like, simian creature appears to be aware of its environment and surroundings and reacts to them accordingly. This allows the player to place objects in front of the EyePet, allowing it to interpret what the object is and respond to it. For example, if the player rolls a ball towards it, it will jump out of the way to avoid being hit. It will also react to the player's actions and sound allowing the user to, for example, tickle the animal or clap their hands to startle it. A trailer shown at E3 2009 shows the pet being customized with outfits and colored fur and interacting with virtual objects including a trampoline and bubble machine. The trailers also demonstrate users drawing custom objects (first trailer shows a car, E3 2009 trailer shows an airplane) which are scanned by the camera and converted to virtual objects which the pet can then interact with. The pet can also be fed, as in the trailers, it is shown eating cookies and a type of pet food.

== Reception ==
Eurogamer scored the original EyePet 6 out of 10. Reviewer Dan Whitehead praised the game as "a showcase of what console cameras and motion-sensing is capable of", initially commenting how convincing the illusion of seeing the CG creature in the real world. However, this illusion is often spoiled by "clumsy" gameplay mechanics. Whitehead also criticised the sometimes vague instructions and a lack of feedback provided when the player fails to carry out an instruction properly. IGN gave the game an 8.0, calling it a game that runs smoothly and has a look that cannot be beaten.
