= Premios 40 Principales for Best Costa Rican Act =

Spanish music award

- Awarded for: Best in Spanish and International music
- Country: Spain
- Presented by: Los 40 Principales
- First award: 2007

The Premios 40 Principales for Best Costa Rican Act was presented annually at Los Premios 40 Principales between 2007 and 2011. It was discontinued due to the creation of Los Premios 40 Principales América, reemerging as part of them in 2014.

Year	Winner	Other nominees
Los Premios 40 Principales España
2007	Por Partes	Escats; Evolución; Le Pop; Nada
2008	Percance	Por Partes; Akasha; El Parque; Evolución
2009	Akasha	El Parque; Esteban Calderón; Mechas; Gandhi
2010	Percance	Fuerza Dread; Escats; 4/ 24; Alonso Solis
2011	Akasha	Los Govinda; Garbanzos; Los Ajenos; Cocofunka
Los Premios 40 Principales América
2014	Percance	Los Ajenos; Cocofunka; Ojo de Buey; Por Partes
