= Latin alternative =

Genre of music

Latin alternative, or "alterlatino", or "Patchanka", is a brand of Latin rock music produced by combining genres like alternative rock, lofi, chillout, metal, electronica, hip hop, new wave, pop rock, punk rock, reggae, and ska with traditional Ibero-American sounds, in Latin Europeans and Latin Americans countries (Spanish, Italian, Portuguese, French and Catalan languages).

== History ==
Rock music has been produced in Iberian America since the late 1950s. Some rock bands started to use unusual instruments such as maracas and quenas. In the late 1960s, artists like Santana started using a different technique to make rock music; by incorporating influences of Latin jazz. Its sound was incorporated by young Latino-players in the US, as an answer to the rock en Español movement in Americas and Spain led by bands like Héroes del Silencio, Caifanes or Los Prisioneros.

In the early 1990s, it was used by Mexican bands such as Maldita Vecindad and Café Tacuba, they were accepted on the Latino circuit in the US, especially by the Mexican community. Subsequently, experimental musician Lynda Thomas earned recognition and commercial success with alternative music in the same decade.

With the passage of time and many musical styles in the US-Latin, Latin alternative has become as diverse as the rock music genre itself. Today, many music journalists and fans regard Latin alternative as a subgenre of rock en Español, and like rock en Español, it may be further divided into more specific genres of music.

== Events and media coverage ==
The most known event of Latin alternative is the Latin Alternative Music Conference (LAMC) that every year gathers a large number of bands from all over the Americas and Spain. The conference was co-founded by artist manager Tomas Cookman and music executive Josh Norek. It was first held in New York City in 2000, moved briefly to Los Angeles, and then returned to New York. The 2009 event featured artists from across the Americas including Argentina's Juana Molina, Puerto Rican hip-hop and reggaeton outfit Calle 13, Colombian group Bomba Estéreo, Brazilian singer-songwriter Curumin and Mexico's Natalia Lafourcade, and was profiled along with the wider Latin alternative scene in an article in The New York Times.

The best known radio show and podcast in the Latin alternative music genre is The Latin Alternative, co-hosted by Josh Norek and Ernesto Lechner. The program launched in 2009 and currently airs on 50 public radio stations each week and is available as a podcast on Spotify and Apple.

== Notable bands and artists by country ==
=== Argentina ===
- Karamelo Santo
- Bersuit Vergarabat
- Cabezones
- Érica García
- Illya Kuryaki and the Valderramas
- Juana Molina
- Nathy Peluso
- La Yegros
- Los Fabulosos Cadillacs
- Vicentico
- Los Auténticos Decadentes
- Los Piojos
- Todos Tus Muertos

=== Brazil ===
- Chico Science
- Marcelo D2
- O Rappa

=== Canada ===
- Alex Cuba
- Santa Lucia LFR
- The Mariachi Ghost

=== Chile ===
- Joe Vasconcellos
- La Floripondio
- Chico Trujillo
- Juana Fé
- Tiro de gracia
- Los Bunkers
- Los Tres
- Mon Laferte
- Daniel Puente Encina
- Rubio
- Alex Anwandter
- GEPE
- Pedro Piedra
- Spiral Vortex
- CAF
- De Pereiras
- Lanza Internacional
- Lopez
- La Brígida Orquesta
- Camila Moreno

=== Colombia ===
- Andrea Echeverri
- Aterciopelados
- Bomba Estéreo
- Cabas
- Carlos Vives
- Estados Alterados
- Juanes
- Lido Pimienta
- Monareta
- Ondatrópica
- LosPetitFellas
- Nicolás y los Fumadores

=== Costa Rica ===
- Akasha
- Debi Nova
- Escats
- Gandhi
- Jose Capmany
- Pneuma

=== Cuba ===
- Addys Mercedes
- Porno Para Ricardo
- Alex Cuba
- Madera Limpia

=== Dominican Republic ===
- Alex Ferreira
- Carolina Camacho
- Toque Profundo
- Rita Indiana

=== France ===
- Mano Negra

=== Guatemala ===
- Di WAV
- Gaby Moreno
- Jesse Baez
- Easy Easy
- Mabe Fratti

=== Italy ===
- Talco
- Rein
- Egin
- Subsonica
- Notagitana

=== Japan ===
- Porno Graffitti

=== Mexico ===
- Cecilia Toussaint
- Caifanes
- Lynda Thomas
- Café Tacvba
- Tijuana No
- La Lupita
- La Gusana Ciega
- Molotov
- Control Machete
- El Gran Silencio
- Plastilina Mosh
- COhETICA
- Jumbo
- Zurdok
- Kinky
- Zoé
- Akwid
- Cartel de Santa
- Mexican Institute of Sound
- Nortec Collective
- Bostich
- Fussible
- Natalia Lafourcade
- Ximena Sariñana
- Los Concorde
- Ely Guerra
- Julieta Venegas
- Sonex
- Ed Maverick

=== Peru ===
- Aly Cat

=== Panama ===
- Los Rabanes

=== Puerto Rico ===
- Calle 13
- Circo
- Draco Rosa
- Zayra Alvarez
- La Secta Allstar
- Puya
- Neuttro
- Radio Pirata
- Mattador
- Cirex
- Nonpoint

=== Spain ===
- Amaral
- Amparanoia
- Bebe
- Chambao
- Che Sudaka
- Enrique Bunbury
- Jarabe De Palo
- Héroes del Silencio
- Rosalía
- Love of Lesbian
- Macaco
- La Mala Rodríguez
- Ojos de Brujo
- The Pinker Tones
- Radio Futura
- Christina Rosenvinge
- Ska-P
- Vetusta Morla

=== United States ===
- Bang Data
- Grupo Fantasma
- Hip Hop Hoodíos
- Origen
- Orixa
- Ozomatli
- Pacha Massive
- Ritchie Valens
- Santana
- Very Be Careful
- Yerba Buena
- Quetzal
- Aaron Andreu

=== Uruguay ===
- Hablan Por La Espalda
- Diego Janssen
- La Vela Puerca
- No Te Va Gustar
- Peyote Asesino
- Sante Les Amis

=== Venezuela ===
- Arca
- Los Amigos Invisibles
- Devendra Banhart
- Jeremías
- Rawayana
- Simon Grossman
- La Vida Boheme

== Record labels for Latin alternative music ==
- Nacional Records
- Afonico Music
- Doula Music
- Happy-fi
- Six Degrees Records
- Surco
- K Industria Cultural
- EMI Latin
- Waxploitation
- Round Whirled Records

== See also ==
- Latin Grammy Award for Best Alternative Music Album
- Mangue Bit
