= Premios 40 Principales for Best Guatemalan Act =

Spanish music award

- Awarded for: Best in Spanish and International music
- Country: Spain/America
- Presented by: Los 40 Principales
- First award: 2007

The Premios 40 Principales for Best Guatemalan Act was an honor presented annually at Los Premios 40 Principales between 2007 and 2011. It was then discontinued due to the creation of Los Premios 40 Principales América, reemerging in 2014 as part of them.

Year	Winner	Other nominees
Los Premios 40 Principales España
2007	Malacates Trébol Shop	Viento en Contra; El Tambor de la Tribu; Sabrina; El Clubo
2008	El Tambor de la Tribu	Viento en contra; Sabrina; Sofía; Tavo Bárcenas
2009	Fabiola	Duo Sway; Bohemia Suburbana; Viento en Contra; El Clubo
2010	Duo Sway	Francis Dávila; Malacates Trebol Shop; El Clubo; Viento en Contra
2011	Los Reyes Vagos	Daniela Carpio; Malacates Trébol Shop; Gaby Moreno; El Tambor de la Tribu
Los Premios 40 Principales América
2014	Piva	Pedro Cuevas; Flaminia Villagrán; Tijuana Love; Ale Mendoza
