= List of awards and nominations received by Miranda! =

Miranda! awards and nominations
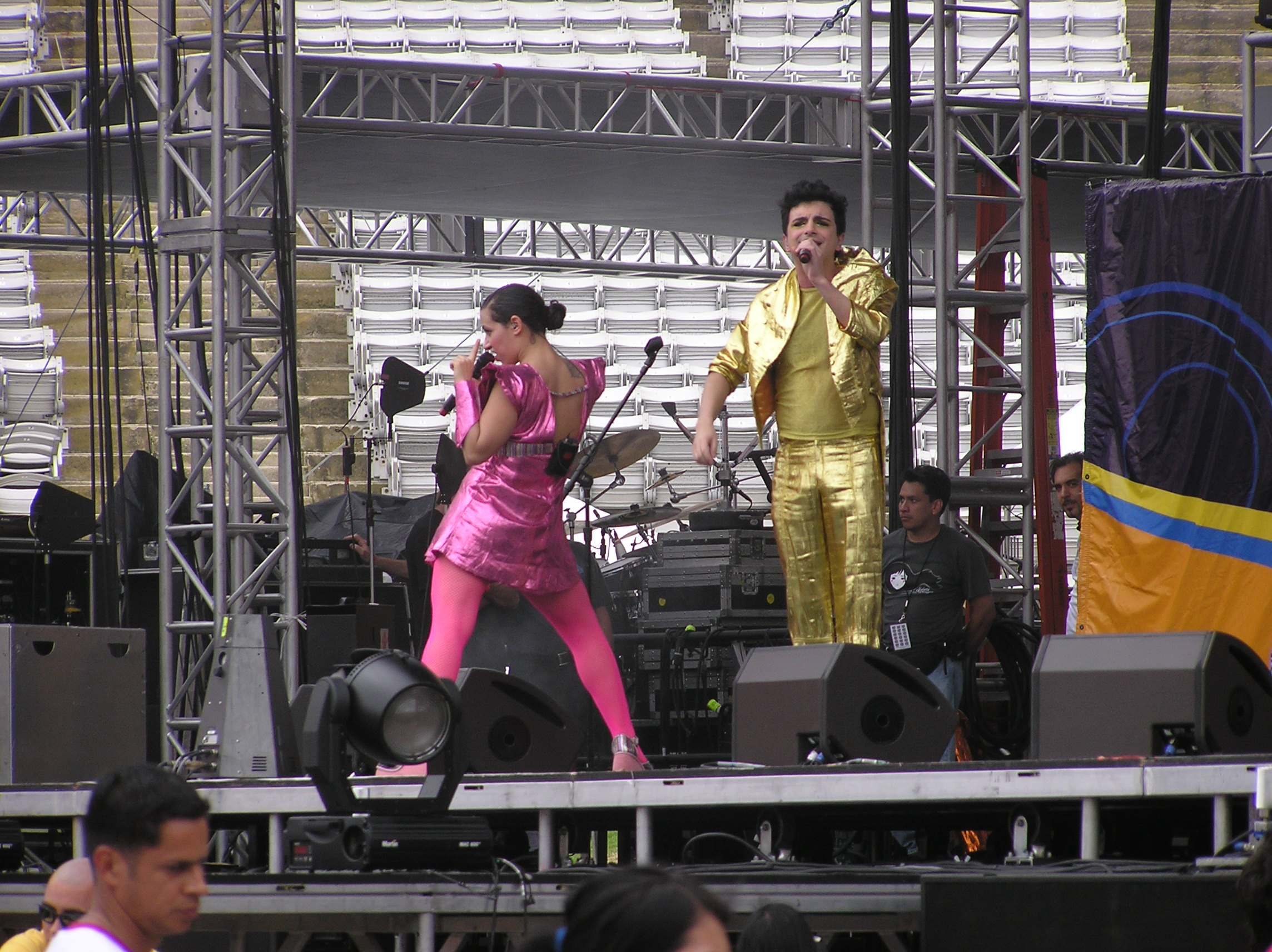
Awards and nominations
Award	Wins	Nominations
Latin Grammy Awards	0	2
Los 40 Music Awards	1	6
Martín Fierro Awards	0	1
MTV Europe Music Awards	1	3
MTV Millennial Awards	0	1
MTV Video Music Awards Latinoamérica	4	20
Nickelodeon Argentina Kids' Choice Awards	0	2
Premios Gardel	8	23
Premios Konex	1	1
Premios Quiero	4	16
Viña del Mar International Song Festival	5	5

Totals (Note: Certain award groups do not simply award one winner. They acknowledge several different recipients, have runners-up, and have third place. Since this is a specific recognition and is different from losing an award, runner-up mentions are considered wins in this award tally. For simplification and to avoid errors, each award in this list has been presumed to have had a prior nomination.)
- Wins: 24
- Nominations: 80

Argentine electropop band Miranda! has received 79 nominations and 23 awards, including twenty MTV Video Music Awards Latinoamérica, seven Premios Gardel, one MTV Europe Music Awards, one Los 40 Music Awards, two nominations for the Latin Grammy Awards, one for the Martín Fierro Awards, two for the Nickelodeon Argentina Kids' Choice Awards, and one Silver Seagull, two Golden Torches and two Silver Torch at the Viña del Mar International Song Festival.

The band was formed in 2001 in Buenos Aires by musicians Alejandro Sergi, Juliana Gattas, Leonardo Fuentes and Bruno De Vincenti. They have released nine studio albums — Es Mentira (2002), Sin Restricciones (2004), El Disco de Tu Corazón (2007), Miranda Es Imposible! (2009), Magistral (2011), Safari (2014), Fuerte (2017), Souvenir (2021) and Hotel Miranda! (2023), and two extended plays — Quereme! Tributo a las Telenovelas (2006) and Precoz (2019). They also released the compilation albums El Templo del Pop (2008) and El Templo del Pop 2 (2016), which include the band's biggest hits such as "Don", "Yo Te Diré", "Perfecta", "Prisonero", among others.

They have achieved gold and platinum certifications in countries such as Argentina, Colombia, Chile and Spain.

== Awards and nominations ==
Award	Year (Note: Indicates the year of ceremony. Each year is linked to the article about the awards held that year, wherever possible.)	Recipient(s) and nominee(s)	Category	Result	Ref.
Latin Grammy Awards	2007	El Disco de Tu Corazón	Best Pop Album by a Duo or Group with Vocal	Nominated	
Latin Grammy Awards	2017	Fuerte	Best Pop/Rock Album	Nominated	
Los 40 Music Awards	2007	Themselves	Best Argentine Act	Won	
Los 40 Music Awards	2008	Themselves	Best Argentine Act	Nominated	
Los 40 Music Awards	2009	Themselves	Best Argentine Act	Nominated	
Los 40 Music Awards	2010	Themselves	Best Argentine Act	Nominated	
Los 40 Music Awards	2011	Themselves	Best Argentine Act	Nominated	
Los 40 Music Awards	2014	Themselves	Best Argentine Act	Nominated	
Martín Fierro Awards	2007	"Enamorada"	Best Original Theme Song	Nominated	
MTV Europe Music Awards	2012	Themselves	Best Latin America South Act	Nominated	
MTV Europe Music Awards	2014	Themselves	Best Latin America South Act	Won	
MTV Europe Music Awards	2014	Themselves	Best Latin American Act	Nominated	
MTV Millennial Awards	2018	Themselves	Best Argentine Artist	Nominated	
MTV Video Music Awards Latinoamérica	2003	Themselves	Best Independent Artist	Nominated	
MTV Video Music Awards Latinoamérica	2003	Themselves	Best New Artist — Argentina	Nominated	
MTV Video Music Awards Latinoamérica	2004	Themselves	Best Alternative Artist	Nominated	
MTV Video Music Awards Latinoamérica	2005	Themselves	Artist Of The Year	Nominated	
MTV Video Music Awards Latinoamérica	2005	"Don"	Video Of The Year	Nominated	
MTV Video Music Awards Latinoamérica	2005	Themselves	Best Group or Duet	Nominated	
MTV Video Music Awards Latinoamérica	2005	Themselves	Best Alternative Artist	Won	
MTV Video Music Awards Latinoamérica	2005	Themselves	Best Artist — South	Won	
MTV Video Music Awards Latinoamérica	2006	"El Profe"	Video Of The Year	Nominated	
MTV Video Music Awards Latinoamérica	2006	Themselves	Best Group or Duet	Nominated	
MTV Video Music Awards Latinoamérica	2007	Themselves	Best Group or Duet	Nominated	
MTV Video Music Awards Latinoamérica	2007	Themselves	Best Pop Artist	Nominated	
MTV Video Music Awards Latinoamérica	2007	Themselves	Best Artist — South	Nominated	
MTV Video Music Awards Latinoamérica	2008	Themselves	Artist Of The Year	Nominated	
MTV Video Music Awards Latinoamérica	2008	Themselves	Best Group or Duet	Nominated	
MTV Video Music Awards Latinoamérica	2008	Themselves	Best Pop Artist	Nominated	
MTV Video Music Awards Latinoamérica	2008	Themselves	Best Artist — South	Won	
MTV Video Music Awards Latinoamérica	2008	Alejandro Sergi	Fashionista Award — Male	Nominated	
MTV Video Music Awards Latinoamérica	2009	Themselves	Best Pop Artist	Nominated	
MTV Video Music Awards Latinoamérica	2009	Themselves	Best Artist — South	Won	
Nickelodeon Argentina Kids' Choice Awards	2012	"Ya Lo Sabia"	Favourite Song	Nominated	
Nickelodeon Argentina Kids' Choice Awards	2015	"Fantasmas"	Favourite Latin Song	Nominated	
Premios Gardel	2005	Sin Restricciones	Best Pop Group Album	Won	
Premios Gardel	2006	En Vivo Sin Restricciones	Best DVD	Nominated	
Premios Gardel	2008	El Disco de Tu Corazón	Best Pop Group Album	Nominated	
Premios Gardel	2009	El Disco de Tu Corazón + Vivo	Best Pop Group Album	Nominated	
Premios Gardel	2010	Miranda Es Imposible!	Best Pop Group Album	Won	
Premios Gardel	2012	Magistral	Best Pop Group Album	Won	
Premios Gardel	2012	Magistral	Album Of The Year	Nominated	
Premios Gardel	2012	Magistral	Best Recording Engineering	Nominated	
Premios Gardel	2012	Magistral	Best Production	Nominated	
Premios Gardel	2012	Magistral	Best Cover Design	Nominated	
Premios Gardel	2012	"Ya Lo Sabía"	Best Videoclip	Nominated	
Premios Gardel	2012	"Ya Lo Sabía"	Song Of The Year	Nominated	
Premios Gardel	2015	Fantasmas	Song Of The Year	Nominated	
Premios Gardel	2015	Safari	Album Of The Year	Nominated	
Premios Gardel	2015	Safari	Best Pop Group Album	Won	
Premios Gardel	2016	Miranda Vivo	Best Pop Group Album	Nominated	
Premios Gardel	2017	Fuerte	Best Pop Group Album	Won	
Premios Gardel	2017	Fuerte	Best Cover Design	Nominated	
Premios Gardel	2020	Precoz	Best Cover Design	Nominated	
Premios Gardel	2020	Precoz	Best Recording Engineering	Nominated	
Premios Gardel	2020	Precoz	Best Pop Group Album	Won	
Premios Gardel	2022	Souvenir	Best Pop Group Album	Won	
Premios Gardel	2023	"Bailando" (with Los Auténticos Decadentes)	Best Duet/Collaboration Song	Won	
Premios Gardel	2024	Hotel Miranda!	Album of the Year	Won	
Premios Gardel	2024	Hotel Miranda!	Best Pop Group Album	Won	
Premios Gardel	2024	Hotel Miranda!	Best Long Form Music Video	Won	
Premios Gardel	2024	Hotel Miranda!	Producer of the Year	Nominated	
Premios Gardel	2024	"Perfecta (Versión 2023)" (with María Becerra and FMK)	Collaboration of the Year	Nominated	
Premios Gardel	2024	"Perfecta (Versión 2023)" (with María Becerra and FMK)	Best Pop Song	Nominated	
Premios Konex	2015	Themselves	Best Pop Group	Won	
Premios Quiero	2011	"Ritmo y Decepción"	Best Pop Music Video	Nominated	
Premios Quiero	2011	Leonardo Damario ("Ya Lo Sabía")	Best Direction	Won	
Premios Quiero	2011	"Ya Lo Sabía"	Best Group Music Video	Nominated	
Premios Quiero	2012	"Dice Lo Que Siente"	Best Group Music Video	Won	
Premios Quiero	2013	"Puro Talento"	Best Group Music Video	Won	
Premios Quiero	2013	"Puro Talento"	Best Pop Music Video	Nominated	
Premios Quiero	2013	Gonzalo López ("Puro Talento")	Best Direction	Nominated	
Premios Quiero	2014	"Extraño"	Best Pop Music Video	Nominated	
Premios Quiero	2014	"Fantasmas"	Best Pop Group Video	Nominated	
Premios Quiero	2015	"Nadie Como Tú"	Best Pop Music Video	Nominated	
Premios Quiero	2016	"Fantasmas"	Best Live Video	Won	
Premios Quiero	2017	"743"	Best Group Music Video	Nominated	
Premios Quiero	2018	"Enero"	Best Group Music Video	Nominated	
Premios Quiero	2019	"Me Gustas Tanto"	Best Group Music Video	Nominated	
Premios Quiero	2020	"Casi Feliz"	Best Group Music Video	Nominated	
Premios Quiero	2021	"Por Amar Al Amor"	Best Group Music Video	Nominated	
Viña del Mar International Song Festival	2006	Themselves	Silver Seagull	Won	
Viña del Mar International Song Festival	2006	Themselves	Golden Torch	Won	
Viña del Mar International Song Festival	2006	Themselves	Silver Torch	Won	
Viña del Mar International Song Festival	2010	Themselves	Golden Torch	Won	
Viña del Mar International Song Festival	2010	Themselves	Silver Torch	Won	

== Other accolades ==
=== Listicles ===
Name of publisher, name of listicle, placement result, and year(s) listed
Publisher	Listicle	Result	Year (s)	Ref.
Rolling Stone	Revelation of The Year	3rd	2002	
