= Los Premios 40 Principales 2007 =

Spanish music awards ceremony

- Date: December 17, 2007
- Location: Madrid, Spain
- Presented by: Los 40
- Hosted by: Tony Aguilar
- Website: los40.com/tag/los40_music_awards/a/

Television/radio coverage
- Network: 40 TV

The LOS40 Music Awards 2007 were held at the Palacio de Deportes de la Comunidad de Madrid on December 17, 2007, and were hosted by Tony Aguilar.

== Awards ==
Spain
Best Song	Best Video
La Quinta Estación — "Me Muero": Melendi — "Calle la Pantomima"; Antonio Carmona (featuring Alejandro Sanz) — "Para Que Tu No Llores"; El Sueño de Morfeo — "Para Toda la Vida"; Conchita — "Nada Que Perder"	Melendi — "Calle la Pantomima": La Quinta Estación — "Me Muero"; Pereza — "Aproximación"; Dover — "Keep On Moving"; Hanna — "Como la Vida"
Best Album	Best Artist
La Quinta Estación — El Mundo Se Equivoca: Miguel Bosé — Papito; Pereza — Aproximaciones; Melendi — Mientras No Cueste Trabajo; El Sueño de Morfeo — Nos Vemos en el Camino	Melendi: Miguel Bosé; Antonio Carmona; Antonio Orozco; Alejandro Sanz
Best Group	Best New Act
Pereza: Dover; Hombres G; El Sueño de Morfeo; Efecto Mariposa	La Quinta Estación: Hanna; Conchita; Melocos; Jaula de Grillos
Best Tour	
Maná — Amar es Combatir Tour: Miguel Bosé — Papitour; La Quinta Estación — El Mundo Se Equivoca Tour España 2007; Antonio Orozco — Cadizfornia Tour 2007; Melendi — Tour 2007	
Latin
Best Latin Act	Best Latin Song
Juanes: Jennifer Lopez; Maná; Motel; Belinda	Juanes — "Me Enamora": Shakira — "Las de la Intuición"; Jennifer Lopez — "Qué Hiciste"; Gloria Trevi — "Todos Me Miran"; Maná — "Manda Una Señal"; Julieta Venegas (featuring Dante) — "Primer Día"
Best Argentine Act	Best Chilean Act
Miranda!: Andrés Calamaro; Coti; Inmigrantes; Vicentico	Kudai: Amango; Difuntos Correa; Sinergia; Six Pack
Best Colombian Act	Best Costa Rican Act
Sanalejo: Andrés Cepeda; Doctor Krápula; Jerau; Sin Ánimo de Lucro	Por Partes: Escats; Evolución; Le Pop; Nada
Best Guatemalan Act	Best Mexican Act
Malacates Trébol Shop: Viento en Contra; El Tambor de la Tribu; Sabrina; El Clubo	Camila: Belinda; Gloria Trevi; Alejandro Fernández; Belanova; Aleks Syntek
International
Best International Act	Best International Song
Nelly Furtado: Mika; Natasha Bedingfield; Tokio Hotel; Snow Patrol	Rihanna (featuring Jay-Z) — "Umbrella": The Fray — "How to Save a Life"; Nelly Furtado — "All Good Things (Come to an End)"; Snow Patrol — "Chasing Cars"; Mika — "Grace Kelly"
Special award
Will Smith

== Live performances ==
=== Main show ===
- Tokio Hotel — "Monsoon"
- El Sueño de Morfeo — "Demasiado Tarde"
- Nek and El Sueño de Morfeo — "Para Ti Sería"
- Chenoa — "Todo Irá Bien"
- Pereza — "Estrella Polar"
- Natasha Bedingfield — "Unwritten"
- Conchita — "Nada Que Perder"
- Motel — "Dime Ven"

=== Concerts ===
- Hombres G
- La Quinta Estación
- Juanes (featuring Nelly Furtado)
