= Los Premios 40 Principales for Best Latin Artist =

Annual Spanish music award

Premios 40 Principales for Best Latin Artist
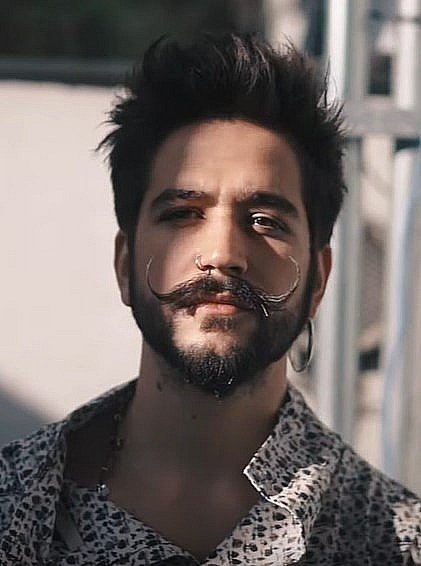
- Camilo is the most recent recipient
- Awarded for: Best in Spanish and International music
- Country: Spain
- Presented by: Los 40 Principales
- First award: 2007
- Currently held by: Camilo (2026)

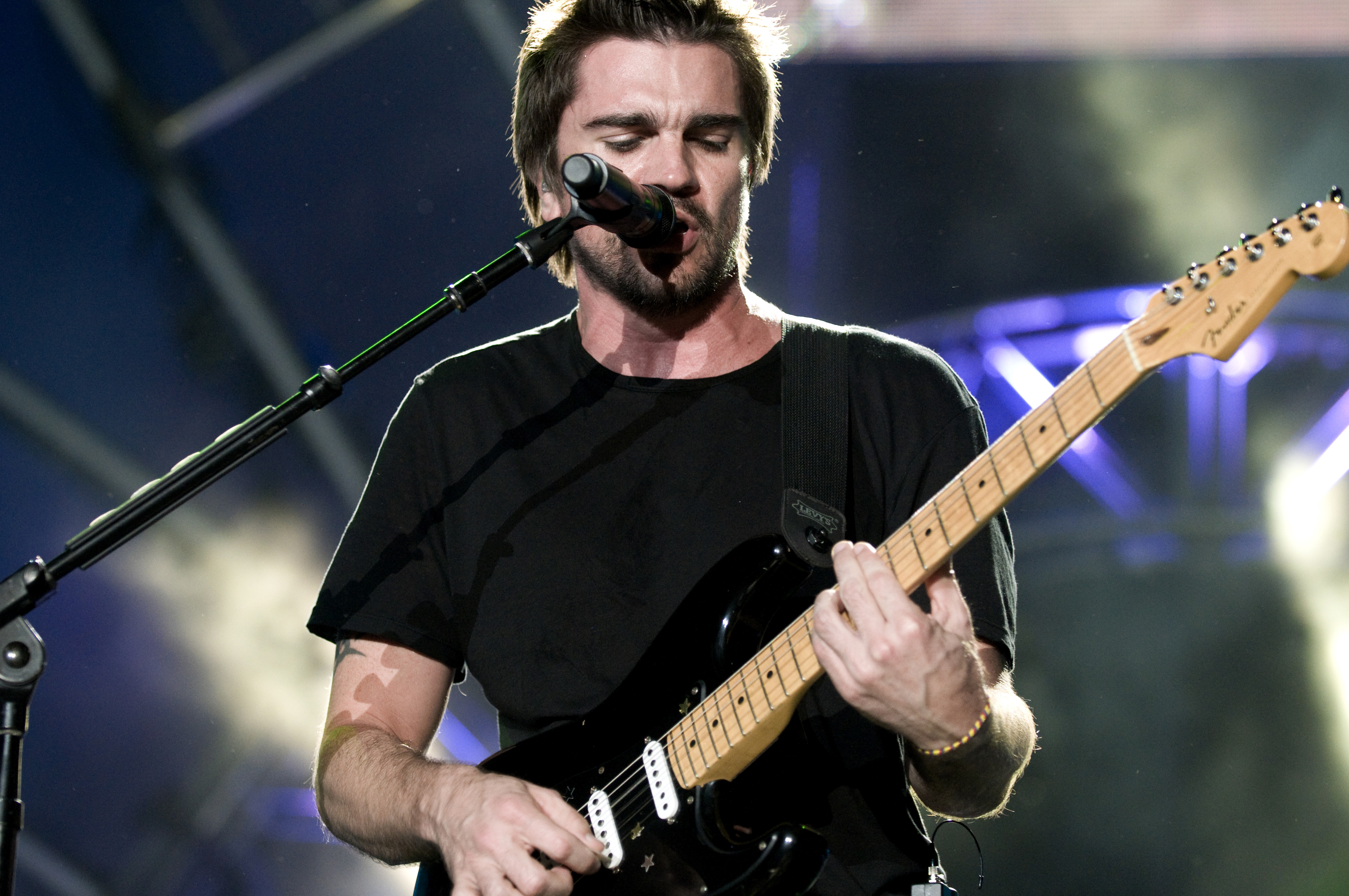
First ever, and two-time, winner Juanes.

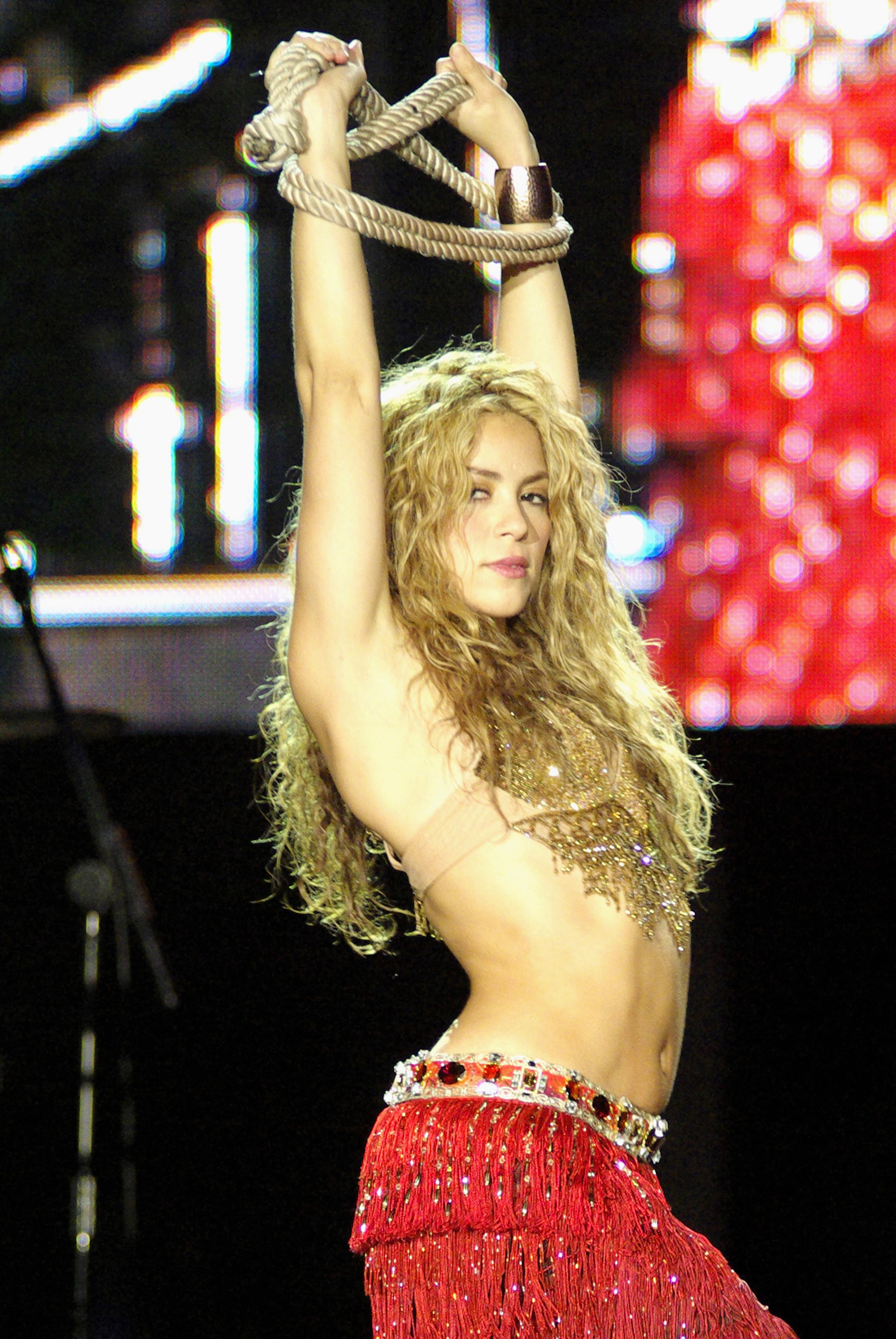
Four-time winner Shakira.

The Premios 40 Principales for Best Latin Artist was an honor presented annually at Los Premios 40 Principales, a ceremony that recognizes excellence in music, organised by Spain's top music radio Los 40 Principales. The award was first seen in 2007, separated from the Best International Artist category, and was replaced by the LOS40 Urban Award in 2019, but brought back the next year as part of an expansion of the Latin category.

Shakira is the most awarded artist in this category, being a four-time winner. Juanes follows her with two awards. In 2013, Ricky Martin became the first non-Colombian artist to notch the award.

Year	Winner	Other nominees
2007	Juanes	Jennifer Lopez; Maná; Gloria Trevi; Belinda
2008	Juanes	Julieta Venegas; Maná; Ricky Martin; Belinda
2009	Shakira	Ha*Ash; Paulina Rubio; Luis Fonsi; Nelly Furtado
2010	Shakira	Juanes; Wisin & Yandel; Camila; Pitbull
2011	Shakira	Maná; Don Omar; Carlos Baute; Ricky Martin
2012	Shakira	Cali & El Dandee; Jennifer Lopez; Juanes; Pitbull
2013	Ricky Martin	Cali & El Dandee; Jesse & Joy; Pitbull; Jennifer Lopez
2014	Wisin	Shakira; Pitbull; Jennifer Lopez; Ricky Martin
2015	Gente de Zona	Paulina Rubio; Nicky Jam; Maná; Prince Royce
2016	J Balvin	Juanes; Carlos Vives; Maná; Maluma
2017	Maluma	J Balvin; Shakira; Luis Fonsi; Juanes
2018	Morat	J Balvin; Maluma; Daddy Yankee; Nicky Jam
Category inactive in 2019
2020	Maluma	Morat; Anitta; Danna Paola; Sebastián Yatra
2021	(Colombia) Sebastián Yatra	(Colombia) Camilo; (Argentina) Tini; (Mexico) Danna Paola; (United States) Becky G
2022	(Brazil) Anitta	(United States) Becky G; (Venezuela) Danny Ocean; (Colombia) Karol G; (Colombia) Maluma; (Colombia) Shakira
2023	(Colombia) Camilo	(Mexico) Carín León; (Colombia) Karol G; (Colombia) Shakira; (Colombia) Manuel Turizo; (Colombia) Maluma
2024	(Puerto Rico) Rauw Alejandro	(Colombia) Camilo; (Argentina) Emilia; (Argentina) María Becerra; (Colombia) Manuel Turizo; (Colombia) Maluma
2025	(Argentina) Emilia	(Colombia) Camilo; (Colombia) Sebastián Yatra; (Colombia) Shakira; (Colombia) Morat; (Colombia) Beéle

== Category facts ==
Most Wins in Category

Rank	1st	2nd	3rd
Artist	Shakira	Juanes; Maluma	Ricky Martin; Wisin; Gente de Zona; J Balvin; Morat
Total Wins	4 wins	2 wins	1 win

Most Nominations

Rank	1st	2nd	3rd
Artist	Shakira; Juanes	Maná	Ricky Martin; Pitbull; Jennifer Lopez; Maluma
Total Nominations	6 nominations	5 nominations	4 nominations
