= Premios 40 Principales for Best Colombian Act =

Spanish music award

- Awarded for: Best in Spanish and International music
- Country: Spain/America
- Presented by: Los 40 Principales
- First award: 2007

The Premios 40 Principales for Best Colombian Act was an honor presented annually at Los Premios 40 Principales from 2007 to 2011. It was discontinued due to the creation of Los Premios 40 Principales América, but reemerged in 2014 as part of this new award ceremony.

Year	Winner	Other nominees
Los Premios 40 Principales España
2007	Sanalejo	Andrés Cepeda; Doctor Krápula; Jerau; Sin Ánimo de Lucro
2008	Katamarán	Cabas; Los de Adentro; Fonseca; Tinto
2009	Andrés Cepeda	Jerau; Santiago Cruz; Mauricio & Palodeagua; Fanny Lu
2010	Santiago Cruz	Dragon & Caballero; J Balvin; Sebastian Yepes; Don Tetto
2011	J Balvin	Pasabordo; Jiggy Dramma; Cali & El Dandee; The Mills
Los Premios 40 Principales América
2014	Maluma	Piso 21; Carlos Vives; Naëla; Alkilados
