= Premios 40 Principales for Best Mexican Act =

Spanish music award

- Awarded for: Best in Spanish and International music
- Country: Spain/America
- Presented by: Los 40 Principales
- First award: 2007

The Premios 40 Principales for Best Mexican Act was an honor presented annually at Los Premios 40 Principales between 2007 and 2011, later reemerging in 2014 as part of Los Premios 40 Principales América.

Year	Winner	Other nominees
Los Premios 40 Principales España
2007	Camila	Belinda; Alejandro Fernández; Belanova; Aleks Syntek
2008	Belanova	Maná; Julieta Venegas; Café Tacuba; Ximena Sariñana
2009	Zoé	Jotdog; Paulina Rubio; Gloria Trevi; Ximena Sariñana
2010	Camila	Alejandro Fernández; Belanova; Panteon Rococo; Moenia
2011	Zoé	Paty Cantú; Belanova; Maná; Ximena Sariñana
Los Premios 40 Principales América
2014	Zoé	Camila; Molotov; Café Tacuba; Jenny and the Mexicats
