= Festival Siembra y Lucha =

Annual metal festival in Costa Rica

Festival Siembra y Lucha is an open air metal festival held annually in San José, Costa Rica since 2012.

== Lineups ==
=== 2012 ===
In its first edition the festival was held on November 24 with 13 local bands and Saurom from Spain as headlining.

- (Spain) Saurom
- (Costa Rica) Nautilus
- (Costa Rica) Asedio
- (Costa Rica) Mythos
- (Costa Rica) Kronos
- (Costa Rica) Peregrino Gris
- (Costa Rica) Eternia
- (Costa Rica) Corpse Garden
- (Costa Rica) Advent Of Bedlam
- (Costa Rica) Heresy
- (Costa Rica) Grecco
- (Costa Rica) NothingariaN
- (Costa Rica) Forever Lost
- (Costa Rica) Seres

=== 2013 ===
In its second edition the festival was held from Friday, 6 December to Sunday, 8 December with 6 local bands and 19 international bands from 11 different countries.

- (Germany) Primal Fear
- (Norway) Mayhem
- (United States) Overkill
- (Sweden) Sabaton
- (Israel) Orphaned Land
- (United States) Suffocation
- (United States) Immolation
- (United States) Tim "Ripper" Owens
- (Finland) Stratovarius
- (Finland) Korpiklaani
- (Scotland) Alestorm
- (Norway) Tristania
- (Spain) WarCry
- (United States) Sanctuary
- (Spain) Lujuria
- (Colombia) Kraken
- (Venezuela) Gillman
- (El Salvador) Virginia Clemm
- (Honduras) Delirium
- (Spain) Saurom
- (Costa Rica) Colemesis
- (Costa Rica) Pneuma
- (Costa Rica) Advent Of Bedlam
- (Costa Rica) Grecco
- (Costa Rica) Final Trial
- (Costa Rica) Kronos

== See also ==
- List of music festivals in Costa Rica
