= Premios 40 Principales for Best Argentine Act =

Annual Spanish music award

- Awarded for: Best in Spanish and International music
- Country: Spain/America
- Presented by: Los 40 Principales
- First award: 2007

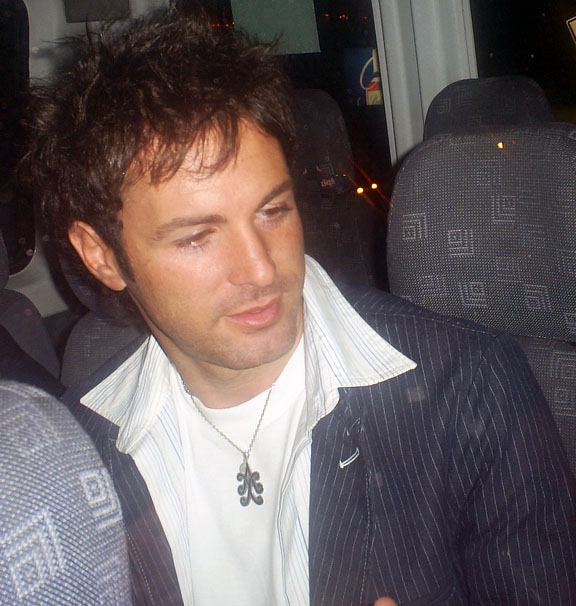
Two-time winner Axel.

The Premios 40 Principales for Best Argentine Act is an honor that was initially presented as part of Los Premios 40 Principales, the awards organized by Spanish music radio Los 40 Principales. Along with the rest of national American categories, it was discontinued after the 2011 edition due to the creation of Los Premios 40 Principales América, reemerging as part of them in 2014.

Year	Winner	Other nominees
Los Premios 40 Principales España
2007	Miranda!	Andrés Calamaro; Coti; Inmigrantes; Vicentico
2008	Axel	Andrés Calamaro; Babasónicos; Gustavo Cerati; Miranda!
2009	Teen Angels	Axel; Fidel Nadal; Babasónicos; Miranda!
2010	Teen Angels	Miranda!; Dante Spinetta; Diego Torres; Emmanuel Horvilleur
2011	Tan Biónica	Miranda!; Axel; Dread Mar I; El Original
Los Premios 40 Principales América
2014	Axel	Tan Biónica; Miranda!; Abel Pintos; Banda de Turistas
