= Cali y El Dandee =

Colombian musical duo

Cali & Dandee
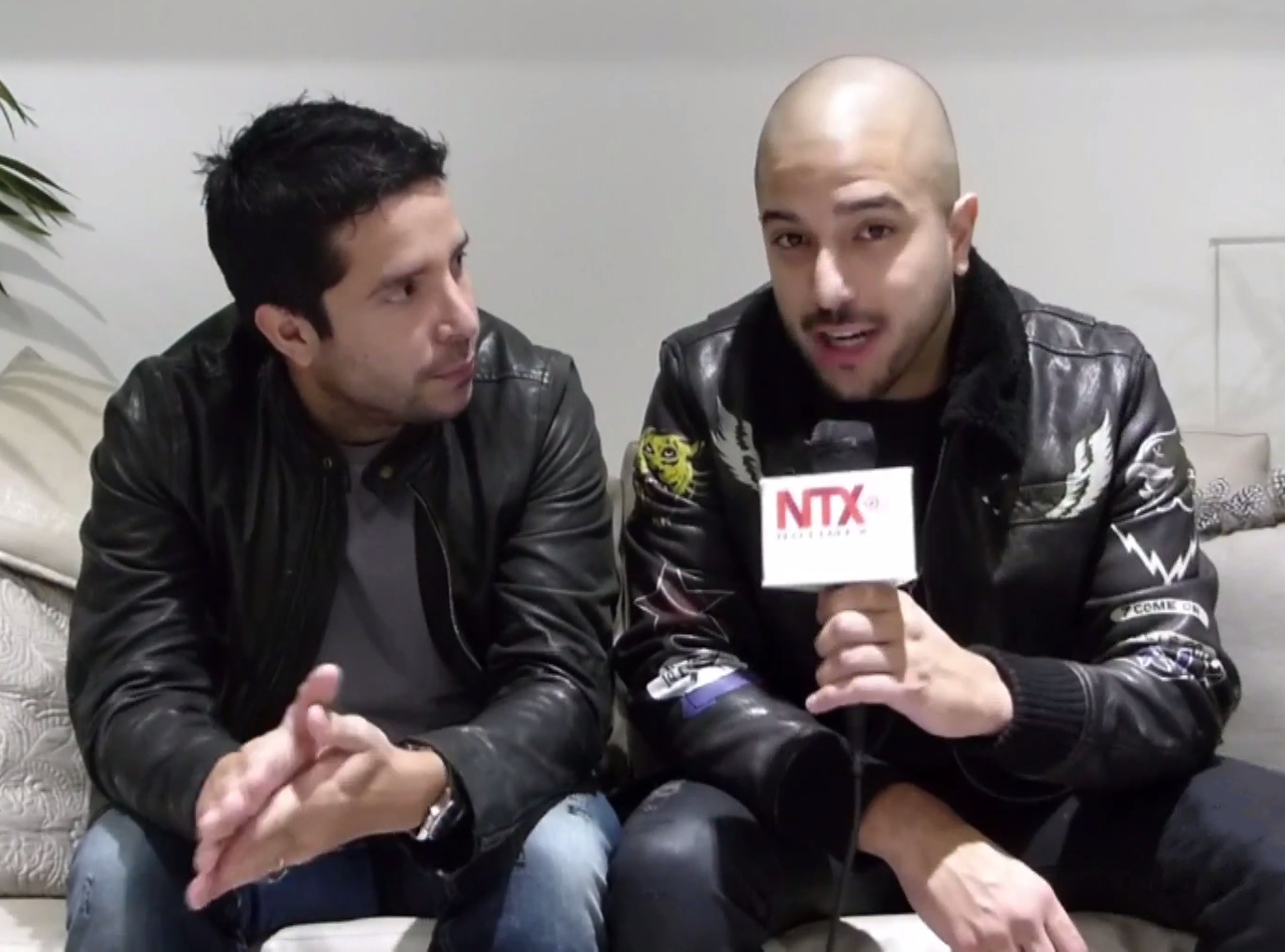
- Cali (right) and Dandee (left) in 2017

Background information
- Origin: Cali, Colombia
- Genres: Latin pop; urbano
- Years active: 2009–present
- Label: Universal Music Spain
- Members: Alejandro Rengifo (Cali); Mauricio Rengifo (Dandee)
- Website: www.caliyeldandee.com

Cali & El Dandee are a Colombian Latin pop and urbano music duo, consisting of brothers Alejandro Rengifo (Cali) and Mauricio Rengifo (Dandee). They started their career in 2008 and have been together since. Besides singing, Dandee is also active as a producer. He co-produced Luis Fonsi's major hit "Despacito".

Their biggest hits are "Gol", "Volver", "Move Your Body", "Tus Ojos", "Lento", and "La Muda". Their most successful singles "Por Fin Te Encontré" and "Yo Te Esperaré" have received more than 800 million and 370 million views respectively on YouTube. Their debut album 3 A.M. was released on July 10, 2012, with the record company Universal Music Spain.

In 2012, Cali & El Dandee collaborated with Spanish singer David Bisbal in the Spanish official anthem for Euro 2012, "No hay 2 sin 3".

== Award and records ==
The group have received several nominations in the Premios Nuestra Tierra.

On July 11, 2011 the group received a Double Platinum certification by PROMUSICAE for sales of 80,000 copies of their single "Yo Te Esperaré" in Spain. The song, which is about love, includes lyrics such as "even though my life's over, I'll wait for you" and "we'll walk along the sea". At the same time, their second single "No Hay 2 Sin 3 (Gol)", featuring David Bisbal, achieved Gold with sales over 20,000 copies. "Yo Te Esperaré" and "No Hay 2 Sin 3 (Gol)" were the second and the tenth best-selling singles of 2012 in Spain.

== Discography ==
=== Studio albums ===
List of studio albums, with selected chart positions and certifications
Title	Album details	Peak chart positions	Certifications
Title	Album details	SPA	Certifications
3 A.M.	Released: 1 January 2012; Label: Universal Music Group; Formats: CD	16	
Colegio	Released: 7 May 2020; Label: Universal Music Group; Formats: CD	14	
Malibu	Released: 25 February 2022; Label: Universal Music Group; Formats: Streaming	80	RIAA: Gold (Latin)

=== Singles ===
==== As lead artist ====
List of singles as lead artist, with selected chart positions and certifications, showing year released and album name
Title	Year	Peak chart positions					Certifications	Album
Title	Year	ARG	MEX	POR	SPA	US Latin	Certifications	Album
"Te tocó perder"	2009	—	—	—	—	—		Non-album singles
"Ven a mí"	2009	—	—	—	—	—		Non-album singles
"Ram Pam Pam"	2009	—	—	—	—	—		Non-album singles
"Volver"	2009	—	—	—	—	—		Non-album singles
"Super sonica"	2010	—	—	—	—	—		Non-album singles
"La muda" (feat. Kevin Roldan)	2010	—	—	—	—	—		Non-album singles
"No necesito más"	2010	—	—	—	—	—		Non-album singles
"Chino"	2010	—	—	—	—	—		Non-album singles
"No me mires así"	2010	—	—	—	—	—		Non-album singles
"Lento"	2010	—	—	—	—	—		Non-album singles
"Yo te esperaré"	2011	—	—	—	1	—	PROMUSICAE: 2× Platinum; RIAA: 2× Platinum (Latin)	3 A.M.
"Gol"	2011	—	—	—	24	—		3 A.M.
"Move your body"	2011	—	—	—	—	—		Non-album single
"La playa" (feat. Natalia Bautista)	2012	—	—	—	22	—		3 A.M.
"No hay 2 sin 3 (Gol)" (feat. David Bisbal)	2012	—	—	—	1	—	PROMUSICAE: Gold	3 A.M.
"No digas nada (Déja vú)"	2013	—	—	—	3	—	PROMUSICAE: Gold; RIAA: Gold (Latin)	3 A.M.
"Te necesito (Déja vú)"	2013	—	—	—	37	—		3 A.M.
"Por siempre"	2013	—	—	—	30	—		Zipi & Zape y el Club de la Canica (Banda Sonora Original)
"Contigo" (with Bonka and Kevin Florez)	2014	—	—	—	—	—		Non-album singles
"Vivo ahora" (feat. Lucas Arnau)	2015	—	—	—	—	—		Non-album singles
"Por fin te encontré" (feat. Juan Magán and Sebastián Yatra)	2015	—	45	20	1	47	FIMI: Gold; PROMUSICAE: 4× Platinum; RIAA: 5× Platinum (Latin)	Non-album singles
"Lumbra" (feat. Shaggy)	2017	—	—	—	6	—	FIMI: Gold; PROMUSICAE: 3× Platinum; RIAA: Platinum (Latin)	Non-album singles
"La estrategia"	2017	—	—	—	95	—	RIAA: Platinum (Latin)	Non-album singles
"Sirena"	2018	57	—	—	49	—	PROMUSICAE: Gold; RIAA: Gold (Latin)	Non-album singles
"Por Que Te Vas" (with Tini)	2018	—	—	—	—	—		Quiero Volver
"Ay corazón"	2019	64	—	—	—	—		Non-album singles
"Sólo mía" (with Greeicy Rendón and Jhay Cortez)	2019	—	—	—	—	—		Non-album singles
"Solo Quiero (Somebody to Love)" (with Leona Lewis and Juan Magán)	2019	—	—	—	—	—		Non-album singles
"Tequila sunrise" (with Rauw Alejandro)	2019	—	—	—	—	—	RIAA: Gold (Latin)	Colegio
"Voy por ti" (with Piso 21)	2019	—	—	—	—	—	RIAA: Gold (Latin)	Colegio
"+" (with Aitana)	2019	—	—	—	2	—	PROMUSICAE: 2× Platinum	11 Razones
"Borracho de amor" (with Reik)	2020	—	—	—	—	—		Colegio
"Tu nombre" (with Mike Bahía)	2020	—	—	—	—	—		Colegio
"Locura" (with Sebastián Yatra)	2020	24	—	—	39	—	RIAA: Gold (Latin)	Colegio
"Nada" (with Danna Paola)	2020	37	—	—	—	—	RIAA: 4× Platinum (Latin)	Colegio
"Yo No Te Olvido" (with Luis Fonsi)	2021	―	—	—	―	—		TBA
"Coldplay" (with Aitana)	2021	—	—	—	62	—		TBA

==== As featured artist ====
- 2015: "Pon el alma en el juego" (with Dulce María, D-Niss, Luciano Pereyra y Sam Alves)
- 2016: "Mil tormentas" (Morat feat. Cali y el Dandee)
- 2016: "Traicionera" (Sebastian Yatra, Cosculluela)
- 2017: "Loca" (Maite Perroni feat. Cali y el Dandee)
- 2017: "Tu me obligaste" (Antonio José feat. Cali y el Dandee)
- 2018: "Como si nada" (Sebastian Yatra, Cali)
- 2018: "Te voy amar" (Andres Cepeda feat. Cali y el Dandee)
- 2021: "Mañana" (Álvaro Soler feat. Cali y el Dandee)

== Awards and nominations ==
=== Premios 40 Principales ===
Premios 40 Principales is an awards ceremony hosted annually by the Spanish radio channel Los 40 Principales.

Year	Nominee / work	Award	Result
2011	Cali & El Dandee	Best Colombian Act	Nominated
2012	"No Hay 2 Sin 3 (Gol)" (with David Bisbal)	Best Latin Song	Nominated
2012	Yo Te Esperaré	Best Latin Song	Won
2012	Yo Te Esperaré	Best America Song	Nominated
2012	Cali & El Dandee	Best Latin Artist	Nominated
2012	Cali & El Dandee	Best America Urban Act	Nominated
2012	Cali & El Dandee	Best America Best South Act	Nominated
2013	Cali & El Dandee	Best Latin Artist	Nominated

=== World Music Awards ===
The World Music Awards is an international awards show founded in 1989 that annually honors recording artists based on worldwide sales figures provided by the International Federation of the Phonographic Industry (IFPI).

Year	Nominee / work	Award	Result
2013	No Digas Nada (Dejá Vu)	World's Best Song	Pending
2013	No Digas Nada (Dejá Vu)	World's Best Video	Pending
2013	Cali & El Dandee	World's Best Group	Pending

=== MTV Europe Music Awards ===
The MTV Europe Music Awards were established in 1994 by MTV Networks Europe to celebrate the most popular music videos in Europe.

Year	Nominee / work	Award	Result
2013	Cali & El Dandee	Best Latin America Central Act	Nominated

=== Premios Nuestra Tierra ===
A Premio Nuestra Tierra is an accolade that recognize outstanding achievement in the Colombian music industry. Cali & El Dandee has received four nominations.

Year	Nominee / work	Award	Result
2014	"No Digas Nada"	Best Song of the Year	Nominated
2014	"No Digas Nada"	Best Pop Performance of the Year	Nominated
2014	Themselves	Best Pop Solo Artist or Group	Nominated
2014	"No Digas Nada"	Best Music Video	Nominated
