= Latin Alternative Music Conference =

- Formation: 2000
- Founder: Tomas Cookman, Josh Norek
- Type: Industry conference and concert series
- Location: New York City, New York, U.S.
- Website: LAMC Website

The Latin Alternative Music Conference (LAMC) is an annual music conference geared towards the marketing and promotion of Spanish-language Latin alternative music, founded in 2000. According to LAMC organizers, over 30,000 people have attended LAMC concerts, parties, and art exhibits at venues throughout New York City.

== History ==
The LAMC was founded in 2000 by Josh Norek and Tomas Cookman as a platform for Latin alternative musicians to network and promote their work. Cookman originally conceived the idea after witnessing packed panel discussions on Latin alternative music at the SXSW festival in Austin, Texas.

Cookman envisioned steady, long-term growth for the genre's popularity, stating: "It’s not going to be exploding tomorrow and then gone nine months later ... It’s not about one song, one band, one dance move, one fashion. We don’t need our Macarena moment." The New York Times described the LAMC as "a gathering of dedicated underdogs, rallying behind music that envisions a polyglot, multicultural, border-hopping 21st-century culture ... all loosely connected by a willingness to push past divisions of genre and geography".

The LAMC celebrated its 20th anniversary in 2019 and its 25th anniversary in 2024.

== Events ==
LAMC features industry panels covering topics such as Marketing to Urban Latino Culture, Approaches to Retail, Print Media/Television/Radio, Advertising & Sponsorship, International Markets, and Music in Film. Notable panelists have included Gabriel Abaroa, Carlos Vives, Pitbull, Thom Russo, Raul Campos, and Johnny Marines.

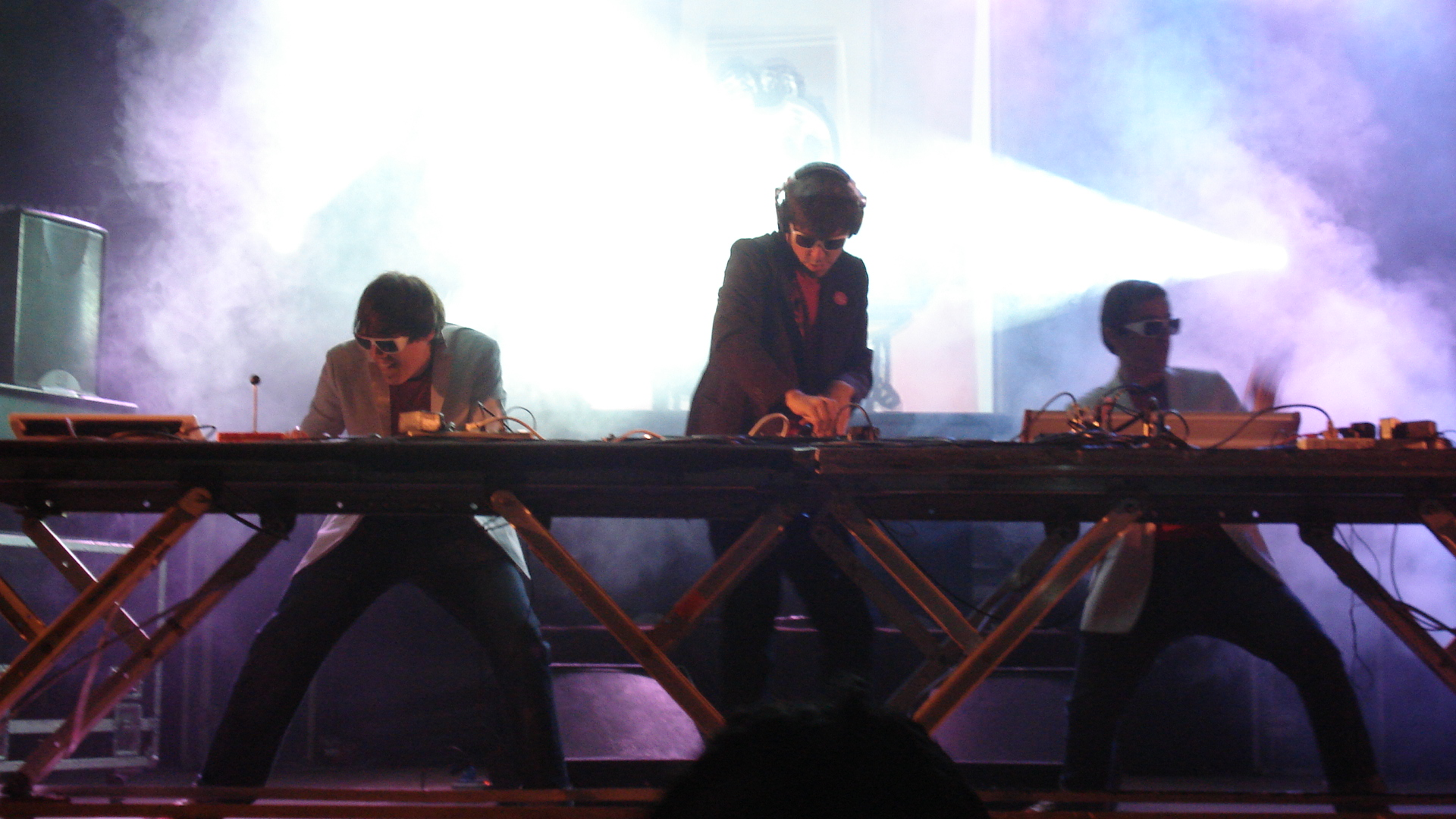
The Pinker Tones, who performed at the LAMC in 2006, 2010, and 2013

The conference also features live concerts by Latin alternative artists at prominent New York City venues, including Prospect Park, Central Park SummerStage, Bowery Ballroom, and Mercury Lounge. Past performers include Ozomatli, Orishas, Julieta Venegas, The Pinker Tones, Manu Chao, Plastilina Mosh, Los Amigos Invisibles, Calle 13, Natalia Lafourcade, Nortec Collective, Babasónicos, León Larregui, and Mexrrissey.

Additionally, the LAMC hosts an annual "discovery" contest to highlight emerging talent. Winners receive an opportunity to perform at an LAMC showcase, feature on the LAMC compilation album, and receive other promotional prizes. Past winners include Kinky, Los Abandoned, Cuarto Poder, Pacha Massive, Carla Morrison, and iLE.
