= Raul Campos =

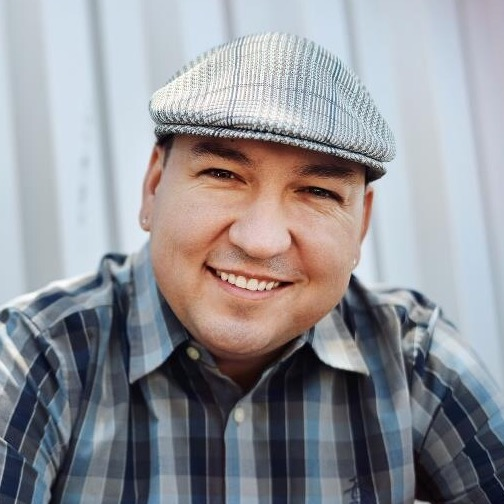

Background information
- Origin: Los Angeles
- Genres: Latin/Alternative/Electronica
- Labels: Nacional Records
- Website: Raul Campos presents Loteria Beats

Raul Campos is a music host on the Los Angeles–based public radio station, KCRW/KCRW.com. Raul Campos creates a mix of emerging artists and current favorites, bringing essential cuts from around the world and a little closer to home. He is regarded as an important DJ in dance music, indie rock and Latin electronica and was described by the Los Angeles Times as a “unique voice in LA radio.”

== Albums ==
Campos released his first Latin alternative mixtape-style album, ‘Loteria Beats Mixtape, Vol. 1’, on Nacional Records on October 23, 2007. The disc includes remixes and tracks from leading acts like Thievery Corporation, David Byrne, Pacha Massive, Nortec Collective and Sérgio Mendes as well as on-the-verge artists like Pacha Massive, Mexican Institute of Sound and The Pinker Tones.

== History ==
Raul Campos was born and raised in east L.A. House, down-tempo, urban-soul, and Latin rhythms are his focus. Working on-air has been Raul's dream since childhood. When he first joined KCRW, ‘Morning Becomes Eclectic’ host and mentor Nic Harcourt took notice of Campos.

== Live Shows ==
Campos is also a club DJ and has been billed at some of LA's biggest parties with popular DJs including Paul Oakenfold, Ron Trent, Static Revenger, Armand Van Helden and Mark Farina. He can also be found spinning at various special events around the country for clients such as Jaguar, Nokia and Frederick's of Hollywood. Raul has also opened for musical acts including Stevie Wonder, Martin Gore of Depeche Mode, Sheila E, Supreme Beings of Leisure and Lionel Richie.
