= Rein (band) =

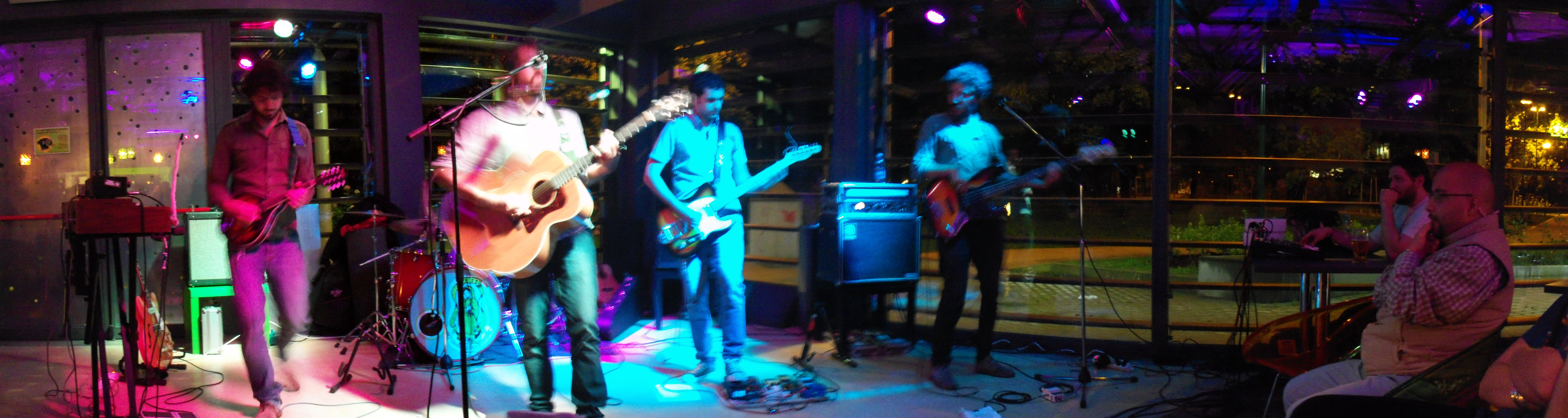
- Rein live on 3 June 2011 in Sesto San Giovanni

Background information
- Origin: Rome
- Genres: Folk punk; ska punk; Latin alternative; combat folk
- Years active: 1999–2012

Rein was an Italian folk punk band from Rome. The group was active between 1999 and 2012.

== History ==
Rein published their first album in 2005, Un'altra estate ("another summer"), and signed with an independent record label from Rome, but eventually terminated the contract at the end of the same year. With the support of the Free Hardware Foundation they published at the end of 2005 the EP Est! ("East!") with the Creative Commons Attribution-NonCommercial-NoDerivatives license and the Diffusion Authorization from the FHF, which allow, combined with another license, the free public performance of the music for non-commercial purposes. All music from Rein is published in Jamendo with a free license.

In May 2008 the second album, Occidente ("West"), was released under CC BY-NC-ND license.

After a good amount of live activity, which also included important international festivals, on 15 October 2010 Rein released their third album, È finita ("it's over"), under the Digital Online Commons license, a variation on CC BY-NC-ND license.

In April 2011 they played in a concert at Villa Borghese gardens in Rome celebrating the Earth Day, together with Patti Smith and Carmen Consoli.

Rein officially disbanded on 21 December 2012 with an announcement on the official website's home page.

== Members ==
- Gianluca Bernardo – songwriter, vocals, folk guitar
- Claudio "Pozzio" Mancini – guitar, keyboards
- Luca De Giuliani – electric guitar
- Pierluigi Toni – bass, double bass
- Gabriele Petrella – drums, choirs (until June 2010)

=== Session musicians ===
- Claudio Montalto – trumpet
- Matteo Gabbianelli – drum kit, choirs (June–October 2010)
- Gabriele Petrella – drum kit, choirs, drums (October 2010 – 2012)

== Discography ==
Studio albums

- 2005 – Un'altra estate
- 2008 – Occidente
- 2010 – È finita

EPs

- 2005 – Est!

Singles

- 2007 – Grandtour

== Bibliography ==
- De Lauro, Pierpaolo (5 December 2008). "Oltre l'etichetta" [Beyond label]. Left (in Italian). No. 49. Rome. p. 88.
- Grossi, Alessia (11 December 2008). "Arte e cultura live, le opere 'libere' da Myspace all'Arci" [Live art and culture, the 'free' works from Myspace to Arci]. l'Unità (in Italian). Rome. Archived from the original on 13 February 2009.
