= Origen (band) =

American pop rock band

- Origin: Miami, Florida, USA
- Genres: Rock en español, Latin pop
- Years active: 2001—present
- Labels: Independent
- Members: Mirs; Hector Velásquez; Antonio Couto
- Past members: Carlos Leal; Ruben Martínez
- Website: www.origenweb.com

Origen is an American pop rock band formed in 2001 in Miami, FL. The three member group consists of lead vocalist María Isabel Rueda (aka Mirs), guitarist Hector Velásquez, and drummer Antonio Couto.

== History ==
Origen began collaborating and recording in 2007 with Grammy-nominated producer Carlos de Yarza and Henry A. Otero. They signed a record deal with their producer's independent label BinaryStar Music and in 2008 released their self-titled debut album Origen. "We come from different countries and cultures and it reflects in our compositions." ..."It gives our music an original flavor." Creating the album was a collaborative effort, with all members writing music and lyrics.

Due to the band's interest in social issues, they have taken part in activities such as “Piedra, Papel, y Tijera” a DirecTV initiative in partnership with the Inter-American Development Bank (IDB) and Microsoft aimed at transforming the physical infrastructure of schools and educational centers while promoting the development of low-income communities throughout Latin America.

In April 2008, following their contribution on “Piedra, Papel, y Tijera” Origen was invited to participate and perform at The Annual Meeting of the Inter-American Development Bank Board of Governors (the Bank's highest policymaking body, consisting of finance ministers and central bankers). There the band had the opportunity to share with other artists like Shakira, Ricky Martin, Juanes, Alejandro Sanz and Juan Luis Guerra that were part of the forum “Yo Amo América” in which Origen participated.

Origen gained significant national exposure during the summer of 2008 as they performed in the Latin Alternative Music Conference in New York City at the BMI showcase. Since that performance they have been featured on MSNBC, CNN, USA Today and were dubbed "a gateway drug into rock in Español" by the press. They also took part in Univision's Premios Juventud where they expressed their continued support for environmental conservation.

On August 4, 2008, they were the featured band on Telemundo's Caso Cerrado, a court-like TV show seen in United States, South and Central America. The 12th of August, Origen made a special appearance on the award-winning news program Al Rojo Vivo hosted by María Celeste, which also airs on Telemundo. September 4, the band made its first appearance on Galavisión's Acceso Máximo; a live interactive program where viewers choose their favorite music videos and artists by text messaging or online voting.

In September 2008, keyboardist Carlos Leal decided to leave the band citing personal goals that interfered with the band's schedule.

In March 2009, Origen filmed the music video for their second single "Coexiste", which was released in the fall of 2009 at an Mtv Staying Alive benefit event. The video was deemed a bit too risqué for certain Hispanic morning shows and a few sections were edited for TV.

Univision.com included the band in their "new talent" series, calling them "a multicultural band with Latin spirit".

June 18, 2009 Origen opened for the international pop/rock band Camila at the Barker Hangar in Los Angeles. Part of that performance aired nationally on LATV.

In June 2010, the band went on their first media tour outside the United States, visiting Ecuador, the home country of lead singer Mirs. El Universo newspaper called them "a group with positive themes." El Diario wrote "They say that when passions meet, no nationality or origin can stop you". El Popular wrote about the band's first performance in the country's capital Quito. Origen reached the Top10 at Alfa Radio in Ecuador due to fan requests and were featured in Metro Ecuador

September 21, 2010 Origen opened for Latin Grammy-winning band Reik and Latin Grammy-winning reggaeton recording artist Daddy Yankee at the Hollywood Palladium in Los Angeles.

In November 2010, the band launched a Kickstarter campaign to help finance a portion of the recording and manufacturing costs of their second album. The project was successfully funded on December 30, 2010, raising a total of $4,642.

The band spent the majority of 2011 composing and recording what would become their sophomore album "Mentiras En Estéreo", once again collaborating with Grammy-nominated producer Carlos de Yarza and Henry A. Otero under the BinaryStar Music label.

On October 2, 2011, Origen opened a second time for pop/rockers Camila but this time at the Fillmore Theater in Miami Beach.

The band's second studio album Mentiras En Estéreo was released on June 19, 2012. A video for their first single Disfrutas Fingir was filmed in 2013.

== Discography ==
=== Te Quiero (Single) (2007) ===
| Track name | Track Time | Written By: |
|---|---|---|
| Te Quiero | 3:56 | Origen |
| Perdón | 3:51 | Origen |
| Te Quiero (Versión Acústica) | 3:56 | Origen |

=== Origen (2008) ===
| Track name | Track Time | Written By: |
|---|---|---|
| Subsónico | 3:29 | Origen |
| Coexiste | 3:30 | Origen |
| Te Quiero | 3:56 | Origen |
| Carne Y Hueso | 3:52 | Origen |
| Muñeca Rota | 3:13 | Origen |
| Y Te Vas | 3:43 | Origen |
| Perdón | 3:51 | Origen |
| Piola | 2:51 | Origen |
| A Ti | 3:28 | Origen |
| Reencuentro | 3:25 | Origen |

=== Mentiras En Estéreo (2012) ===
| Track name | Track Time | Written By: |
|---|---|---|
| Bienvenido A Tu Show | 3:37 | Origen |
| Disfrutas Fingir | 3:14 | Origen |
| Mentiras En Estéreo | 3:14 | Origen |
| Sogas de Piel | 3:11 | Origen & Carlos de Yarza |
| Oasis | 3:22 | Origen & Carlos de Yarza |
| No Dejes | 4:08 | Origen & Henry A. Otero |
| Volaré | 2:52 | Origen & Lenny Peña |
| Armas de Distracción Masiva | 3:30 | Origen |
| Otra Vez | 3:06 | Origen |
| Sabrás | 4:00 | Origen |
| Ojos Tristes | 3:47 | Origen |
