= Jenny and the Mexicats =

Mexican-Spanish-British band

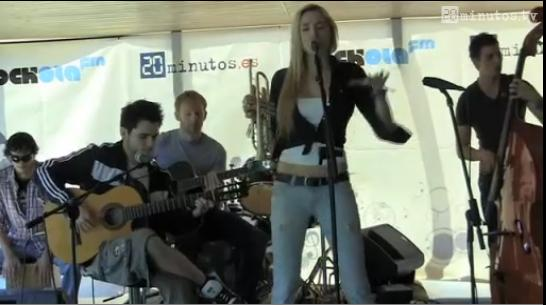

Background information
- Also known as: Pachucos y la Princesa
- Origin: Madrid, Spain, June 2008
- Genres: Flamenco, indie folk, cumbia
- Years active: 2008–present
- Label: Mexicat Records (own label)
- Members: Jenny Ball; David González Bernardos; Pantera (Alfonso Acosta); Icho (Luis Díaz)
- Website: www.jennyandmexicats.com

Jenny and the Mexicats, previously known as Pachucos y la Princesa, is a multicultural band composed of English trumpeter and singer Jenny Ball, Spanish percussionist David González Bernardos, and the Mexican musicians Pantera (Alfonso Acosta) on guitar and Icho (Luis Díaz) on double bass. Their style blends elements of flamenco, jazz, folk, and cumbia, with lyrics in both English and Spanish. The band is considered independent, and it does not have a contract with any record company.

In 2012, Jenny and the Mexicats founded Mexicat Records. They moved to Mexico City, and released their self-titled debut album on their own label.

== Discography ==
=== Studio albums ===
- 2012: Jenny and the Mexicats
- 2014: Ome
- 2017: Mar abierto/Open Sea
- 2018: Ten Spins Round the Sun (10 Year Anniversary Album)
- 2019: Fiesta Ancestral

=== Singles ===
- "Verde más allá"
- "Me voy a ir"
- "Flor"
- "Labios"
- "Boulevard"
- "Frenético ritmo"
- "Me and My Man"
- "La diabla"
- "El telón" feat. Vetusta Morla
- "La cumbia del vino"

=== Collaborations ===
- "Se viene, se va", Mr. Kilombo (2014)
- "La noche", with Mario Sandoval (2015)
- "Tiene espinas el rosal", with Grupo Cañaveral (2016)
- "La madre que la trajo", Javier Sólo (2021)

== Awards and nominations ==
Year	Award	Category	Result	Ref
2012	Los Guilles	Best World Music or Musical Hybrid	Winner	
2014	Los Premios 40 Principales 2014	Best Mexican Act	Nominated	
