= 40 TV =

Defunct TV channel in Spain

LOS40 TV
- Country: Spain

Ownership
- Owner: LOS40

History
- Launched: September 1, 1998; 26 years ago
- Closed: February 27, 2017; 8 years ago
- Former names: 40 TV

LOS40 TV (originally 40 TV) was a television channel property of LOS40, a radio station in Spain. The channel specialised in music and broadcast music videos throughout the day. The channel was available 24 hours a day through Movistar+ and some cable providers. It started broadcasting on September 1, 1998 and shut down on February 17, 2017.

== History ==
The channel began its broadcasts on September 1, 1998 replacing the "+ Música" channel, both produced by Sogecable. On September 9, 2005, the channel changed its image, both in logo and graphic line, resembling more its sister station. On December 11, 2014, the channel began broadcasting in a "16:9" format. At the beginning of February 2016, the channel incorporated the new graphic identity of the LOS40 Radio for the television version.

=== 40 Latino ===
In addition to this channel, 40 Latino was also created afterwards, which aired on Spain's DTT until August 23, 2010, and was later replaced by Canal+2 (with an additional fee). The channel continued to be available on several pay-TV platforms (including Canal+ and Orange TV) until the definitive cease of its broadcasts on January 4, 2012. Since then, the contents of 40 Latino have been broadcast on LOS40 TV until it was shut down.

== Contents ==
LOS40 was formatted as a music video channel dedicated to both national and international artists. This channel's programming consisted of pop news reports, best-selling charts, specialized programs and monographs, as well as blocks of the best music videos of a genre/artist and mostly, video playlist fillers. LOS40 TV was also presented in the main musical events (pop festivals, concerts, events) and had a strong commitment to the development of exclusive content.

The channel was available to all payment operators in Spain except Vodafone TV.

== Former programming ==
The first five of these programmes were transmitted simultaneously on TV and radio.

- Fórmula 40: an uninterrupted program that broadcasts music videos as they're playing out on LOS40 radio station. This program serves as the channel's schedule filler.
- Del 40 al 1: televised version of the chart of LOS40 which is considered as the biggest in Spain. It was presented by Tony Aguilar and aired Saturday 11:00-15:00, with repeats on Sundays and Mondays.
- 40 Classic: music videos from the 1980s and 1990s.
- Del 40 al 1 Xpress: in half an hour, an updated part of the chart is featured daily: Tuesdays from 40 to 31, Wednesdays from 30 to 21, Thursdays from 20 to 11, and Fridays from 10 to 1.
- World Dance Music: dance and house music videos presented by Luiz Lopéz.
- Formula Weekend presented by Tony Aguilar and Joaquin Luqui.
- Rockola 40: humorous program hosted by Guillem Caballé.
- Superventas UK / USA: a one-hour block featuring the best-selling albums/songs from Britain/America. Hosted by Tony Aguilar and Manuela Velasco.
- Intro: a dedicated music news programme. Hosted by Tony Aguilar and Manuela Velasco. Later, the latter was replaced by Cristina Teva.
- Fanclub: a programme showcasing what the fans can do for their favourite concerts, artists... in half an hour.
- Los Ángeles de 40: LOS40 reporters went around L.A. and explored the most important events of youth culture. Presented by Cristina Teva, Elena Valueng and Blanca Jara.
- Misión 40: weekly program that replaces Los Ángeles de 40, Elena Valueng and Cristina Teva address their encounters with artists or events, such as a mission, a challenge or a dare.
- Gran clip: Elena Valeung presented the best music videos that LOS40 TV played in some of its first years of broadcasting.
- Gen 40: A programme that letting artists picking the music videos from their musical influences.
- Mi primera vez: some of a major artist's first interviews with LOS40, which are introduced by the editor's comments on the attitude of the artist and the first impressions caused, conclude with a quick review of the moments that have been definitive in his/her career to get where they are today.
- Rockstation: Non-stop rock music videos.
- Superventas Digitales: A 60-minute weekly review of the most legally downloaded songs. After two special broadcasts during Christmas 2013, the program was dropped without prior warning and any explanation.
- Superventas España: A 65-minute weekly review of the highest-selling songs across Spain. Similar to Superventas Digitales, after two special broadcasts during Christmas 2013, the program was dropped. The programme was on air since 1997, when the channel was still called "+ Musíca".
- Colección 40: The best music videos from a band or artist of the moment.
- Indiegentes: Non-stop independent/alternative music videos.
- Hip Hop: Non-stop hip-hop music videos.
- 40 Dance Mix: The most listened to dance songs in the past 7 days.
