= Sonex (band) =

Mexican band from Xalapa, Veracruz

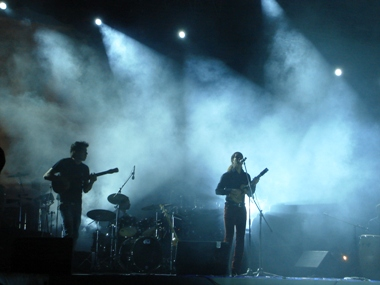
- Sonex performing on March 20, 2008 in Tampico, Mexico.

Background information
- Origin: Xalapa, Veracruz, Mexico
- Genres: World Music, Latin Music, Son Jarocho
- Years active: 2005–present
- Labels: Zafra
- Members: Luis Felipe Luna; Helio Martín del Campo; Camil Meseguer; Jerónimo González; Renato Domínguez; Randy Ramírez
- Website: Official Website

Sonex is a Mexican band from Xalapa, Veracruz. They are the winners of the National Geographic Channel contest "Tu música también cuenta - Día de la Tierra".

== History ==
Sonex was formed in 2005, combining the regional folk musical style Son Jarocho with other musical genres such as traditional African music, Afro-Peruvian music and Venezuelan music.

Their first record was produced by Zafra Music in 2007, with the participation of the photographer Graciela Iturbide and with musical guests like Rubén Albarrán from Café Tacvba and the band Ojos de Brujo. Sonex has performed in different music festivals: Festival México: Puerta de las Américas (Mexico City, 2006), Vive Latino (Mexico City, 2010), Cumbre Tajín (Papantla Veracruz 2011), Washington D.C.’s Duke Ellington Jazz Festival (J.F. Kennedy Center, Washington D.C., 2007), Japanese American National Museum (Los Ángeles, 2007) and as Mexican ambassadors in the Ibero-American Summit (La Moneda Palace, Santiago de Chile, 2007).

Sonex won the National Geographic Channel and Myspace contest: “Tu música también cuenta" with the song "Sobre tus Aguas", as a commemoration for the Earth Day. This achievement was among more than 11,500 songs.
