= Malacates Trébol Shop =

Malacates Trebol Shop
- Origin: Guatemala City, Guatemala City, GUA
- Genres: Ska; Rock; Pop; Latin
- Years active: 1997–Present
- Label: BarcelonetaMusic.com
- Website: http://www.malacates.com/

Malacates Trebol Shop is a Guatemalan Rock Pop Latino band best known for their innovative and unique compositions. The band's varied musical style has fused traditional rock and ska with various elements of insanos and pop. They have recorded five albums:

1. Paquetecuetes
2. Sí
3. Sólo éxitos…(dicen)
4. De Que Sirve Querer?
5. A quien corresponda
6. Malacates marimba

From the Album Paquetecuetes, the following singles were released: Ni un Centavo, Mojado, Pa'que te acuerdes de mi. These were top hits on Central American radio stations for more than 15 weeks.

From the Album Sí, the singles released were Quisiera, Mariachi, Funky Disco, Canción dentro de mí and Morena, theme that was the official campaign song for Pepsi in 2000. The single Tómame was also the official campaign song for Summer in 2005 for the Beer: Cerveza Gallo, the Most important Beer in Guatemala and Central America.

Malacates have performed in Guatemala, Mexico, and the United States., where they have shared stage with artists such as Los cumbia stars, Gaby moreno, Los Caligaris, Rebeca Lane, Gondwana and Belanova.

In 2007, they were nominated for being the best national band of Guatemala by Los Premios Principales in Madrid, Spain, an event organized by the Los 40 radio station, Spain's most influential music station.

== Albums ==
- Paquetecuetes (1999)

  1. Malacates
  2. Ni un centavo
  3. ¿Quién sos?
  4. Pa'que te acuerdes de mi
  5. Siempre lo mismo
  6. 40 R
  7. Por esta noche
  8. Arreglo Zapatos
  9. Ponte en 4
 10. Mojado
 11. La Niña-ishta concupiscente
 12. 25
 13. Dolor
 14. Hoy no
 15. Bai-klin
 16. Ni un centavo (version rockola)

- Si (2002)

1. Quisiera
  2. Mariachi Funky Disco
  3. Otra vez
  4. El Baile del Chinique
  5. El Beso
  6. La Niña #2
  7. Canción Dentro de Mí
  8. Gracias a Dios
  9. Ay de Mí
 10. Isabel
 11. Otra de Payasos
 12. Morena

- Solo Exitos ...dicen... (2005)

  1. Como Jaime Viñals
  2. El Regalito
  3. Tere
  4. Déjame llegar
  5. El vaso
  6. Otra Botella más
  7. Tómame
  8. Acapulco
  9. Quisiera
 10. Ni un Centavo
 11. Pa'que te acuerdes de mi
 12. Morena
 13. Mojado
 14. Canción dentro de mi

- "¿De qué sirve querer?" (2008)

  1.	¿De Qué Sirve Querer?  
  2.	Este Es El Bar  
  3.	Todo se pagará  
  4.	Yo quiero ser  
  5.	Amor de tres  
  6.	Casablanca  
  7.	Bella  
  8.	Déjame  
  9.	Tango Pa´ti  
  10.	Luna de Xelajú  
  11.	Outro 

- "A quien corresponda" (2014)

  1. Lágrimas por Thelma  
  2. Preciosa  
  3. Todo tu Amor  
  4. Luna Llena – ft Gaby Moreno  
  5. Dormido  
  6. De Colores  
  7. Corazón  
  8. Tal Vez – ft Rebeca Lane  
  9. El Ayer No Va a Volver  
  10. 1982

"Malacates marimba” (2024)

1. Preciosa
2. Todo se pagara
3. Déjame llegar
4. Pa’ que te acuerdas de mi
5. Tal vez
6. Ni un centavo
7. Tomame
8. Luna llena
9. Medley

== Members ==
- Francisco Páez - Voz
- Jacobo Nitsch - Trumpet
- Rodolfo Hernández - Guitar
- Leonel Hernández - Drums
