= Ondamedia =

Video streaming service

- Website type: Streaming video
- Available in: Spanish
- Founded: 2017
- Headquarters: Santiago, Chile
- Founder: Ministry of Cultures, Arts and Heritage
- Key people: Ian Goldschmied (Director)
- Website: ondamedia.cl
- Launched: 8 June 2017
- Current status: Active

Ondamedia is a Chilean public OTT streaming platform owned by the Ministry of Cultures, Arts and Heritage, aimed at bringing national cinema and culture closer to citizens.

== History ==
Developed by Mediastream Platform Next, Ondamedia was launched in 2017 as an initiative of the National Council of Culture and the Arts (now the Ministry of Cultures, Arts, and Heritage) to promote the consumption of Chilean cinema nationwide.

On June 8 of that year, a beta version of Ondamedia was released, featuring a catalog of 40 fiction films, 41 documentaries, 20 short films, and 394 clips related to science, arts, and humanities, with a limit of eight views per month.

In March 2020, Ondamedia removed all viewing restrictions, granting unlimited access to its films, documentaries, and short films. That same year, amid the mandatory lockdown during the COVID-19 pandemic, the platform reached 2,200,000 views—six times its audience from the previous year.

By 2023, each film featured in the catalog averaged 15,000 viewers.

== Availability and access ==
Ondamedia offers content management and has an identity validation system connected to the Civil Registry and Identification Service. In 2023, a cycle focused on movies related to the Chilean military dictatorship was available worldwide.

The platform is available in Chile on the web, Android TV, Chromecast, and LG and Samsung Smart TVs, as well as on mobile devices, including iPhone, iPad and Android.
