= Ojo de Buey =

Latin reggae band

Ojo de Buey is a Costa Rican reggae band whose music blends reggae with Latin and Afro-Caribbean influences.

== History ==
Ojo de Buey was formed by a group of seven musicians in Costa Rica. The name Ojo de Buey, meaning 'Bull's-eye' in Spanish, was inspired by a seed native to Costa Rica bearing the same name and is traditionally considered a good-luck charm by locals. Three days before their official live debut, they put together a repertoire of seven covers and one original song. For several months, they continued performing reggae-rock covers at parties and small bars. At the end of July, Ojo de Buey retreated to a beach house in Playa Herradura, Costa Rica, for 10 days to record what would become their first full-length album. Later, in October 2010, they recorded wind instrument arrangements, piano, Hammond organ, and added a few final touches to the album in Los Angeles, California. Here, the album was mixed by Manu Jimenez in Los Angeles and Nick Sabia in Costa Mesa; then it was mastered by Eric Boulanger at The Mastering Lab. As a result, Sabor en un tiempo cruel became the band's debut album in March 2011, receiving the ACAM Award for Best Reggae Album that same year. The band has released a total of three albums and fifteen singles and has performed at venues in several countries across the Americas.

== Style and lyrical themes ==
The band’s music is rooted in reggae and incorporates Latin rhythms and Afro-Caribbean influences, often addressing social themes. The band has cited Bob Marley and Gregory Isaacs as notable influences on their reggae-oriented sound. Their instrumentation typically includes horns, percussion, keyboards, and guitar, reflecting a mixture of reggae and Afro-Latin rhythmic patterns.

The band's lyrics focus on themes related to daily life, interpersonal relationships, and cultural identity. Recurring topics include love, optimism, and social cohesion. In some works, the group addresses social and contemporary issues, though generally through accessible and narrative-driven lyrical structures.

== List of venues and events ==
- Centro Nacional de la Cultura (CENAC), San José – presentation of Repelente pal’ dolor album (2013)
- Festival Viva el Planeta (2015)
- Festival Vive Latino, Mexico City (2016)
- Patrons Bar & Grill, Dominical, Costa Rica — Reggae to the Rescue benefit (July 16, 2016)
- La Tribuna, Cartago – Bob Marley tribute tour (2017)
- La California – Concha de La Lora – Bob Marley tribute tour (2017)
- Playa Tamarindo – Bob Marley tribute tour (2017)
- Jacó – Bob Marley tribute tour (2017)
- Sol Venue, Carson, California, USA (Aug 3, 2017)
- Neck of the Woods, San Francisco, California, USA (Aug 4, 2017)
- Reggae on the River, Garberville, California, USA (Aug 6, 2017)
- Jazz Café Escazú, San José (Nov 30, 2017)
- Parque de Diversiones, San José, Costa Rica (Mar 3, 2018)
- Casa Rojas, San José – Laguna Pai y Ojo de Buey (Dec 1, 2023) and Ojo de Buey & Mentados (Aug 31, 2024)
- Hooligan’s Plaza Real, Alajuela – Christmas show (Dec 25, 2024)
- Foro Indie Rocks, Mexico City – As part of tour with Laguna Pai. (June 6, 2025)
- Cultural Roots, Mexico City – As part of tour with Laguna Pai. (June 7, 2025)
- Parque La Libertad, Desamparados – part of Concierto gratuito por la democracia (Nov 15, 2025)
- Velada en Paseo de las Flores (El Fortín Principal), San Francisco District (Jan 24, 2026)

== Discography ==
=== Albums ===
- Sabor en un tiempo cruel (12 tracks; 2011)
- Repelente pal' dolor (12 tracks; 2013)
- Seguir Sumando (12 tracks; 2017)

=== Singles ===
- Una Sola Nación (feat. Bachaco) (2014)
- Is This Love (feat. Kafu Banton) (2016)
- Jugada de Pared (2017)
- Run (feat. Lutan Fyah) (2019)
- Uppercut (feat. BlackDali) (2020)
- Keep On Trying (2021)
- Amor del Bueno (2022)
- La Cura (Bailando Conmigo) (feat. RVS) (2022)
- Bailar Un Martes (Cada vez que te veo) (feat. Toledo) (2023)
- La Calma (feat. Laguna Pai) (2023)
- Verano Caribeño (feat. Jahricio) (2023)
- Yo Te Doy (2024)
- Vuelve (2024)
- La Ola Que Illusiona (2024)
- Creer en mí (2025)

== Band members ==
- Carlos Agüero "Cayeto" – Lead vocals and rhythm guitar
- Cherry Brown – backing vocals
- Shurry Rubí – backing vocals
- Bryan Sojo – bass guitar
- Ronny Flores "I keys Dub" – keyboard
- Oscar Kopper – lead guitar
- Wilberth Zúñiga – drums
