= Pacha Massive =

- Origin: New York
- Genres: Electronica, drum and bass, Latin
- Years active: 2005–present
- Labels: Nacional Records
- Website: Pacha Massive

Pacha Massive (from ‘Pachamama’ meaning "Mother Earth"), is a Latin alternative band led by Dominican-born multi-instrumentalist, DJ and producer Nova. Formed in the Bronx, New York in 2005, the band was Nacional Records’ first U.S.-based signing. The band incorporates elements of electronica, Cuban son, Dominican Palo, reggae, dancehall, dub, hip-hop, house music, Colombian cumbia, and drum'n'bass dance rhythms.

== History ==
The name was chosen while watching a documentary on the Quechua people's culture, when Nova gathered with some friends to jam, which led to the formation of the group in 2005. The band's first gig was at Madison Square Garden as opening act for the Colombian rock group Aterciopelados. After winning the Latin Alternative Music Conference (LAMC) Battle of the Bands contest, the band was signed by Nacional Records. Their music has been featured on TV and film including From Prada to Nada, The Heartbreak Kid, La Mujer de Mi Hermano, and Las Vegas, and received airplay on Indie 103.1 (Los Angeles), KCRW (Los Angeles), KEXP (Seattle), and KUT (Austin).

Their debut release, All Good Things, was self-produced by Nova with additional mixing in Monterrey, Mexico by Alejandro Rosso of Plastilina Mosh.

The group's first appearance in a soundtrack was featured in the 2005 film La Mujer de Hermano which was released in April 2006. It was their track Don't Let Go.The group released its debut album, All Good Things, on Nacional Records in February 2007. They have played as support act for Morcheeba, Taio Cruz, Ozomatli, Café Tacvba, Los Amigos Invisibles, Aterciopelados and Sidestepper. MTV Tr3s selected them as the channel's first Descubre and Download artist, featuring the single "Don't Let Go". They also co-hosted the weekly countdown show Mi TRL in February 2007. Their second studio album If You Want It was released in September 2009. Later in 2009, the group began working on their third studio album Where We Come From and it took six years to create. It was released in July 2015.

Their track "Don't Let Go" was also featured on the EA Sports soundtrack of the video game FIFA 08 as well as featured in The Chicas Project.

== Discography ==
- All Good Things (2007)
- If You Want It (2009)
- Where We Come From (2015)
- Normal (2020)
