= Pneuma (band) =

Costa Rican thrash metal Band

- Origin: San José, Costa Rica
- Genres: Thrash Metal; Death Metal; Experimental Rock
- Years active: 2003–present
- Members: Antonio Masis; Emanuel Calderón Sanchez; Daniel Vega; Jose Sibaja
- Website: http://pneumametal.com/site/

Pneuma /Nɛ'umɑː/ is a Costa Rican thrash metal Band from San Jose, formed in 2003.

Pneuma was founded by four guys with a taste for thrash metal, death metal and experimental rock. The band has had great success in their native Costa Rica receiving various awards and recognitions along the way. The band is composed of Antonio Masis who is the bassist and vocalist for the group. Norman Mena's exceptional drumming instruments give the band the "Thrash" feel while Daniel Vega handles the lead guitar accompanied by Jose Sibaja also on guitar. In 2023, Emanuel Calderón Sánchez joined Pneuma as their drummer, further strengthening the band’s lineup with his experience from other Costa Rican metal projects.

== History ==
=== Early Years (2002–2004) ===
In their first couple of years, Pneuma earned a good reputation in the metal and progressive scene, recording in 2004 their first EP A Run Through.

=== The Awakening Tour (2005–2008) ===
In 2005, Pneuma went on "The Awakening Tour", which made a big impact in the Central American metal scene and captured the attention of the local media. In 2006 Pneuma was voted Best Band of the Year by readers of one of the most popular rock websites in the country: La Escapatoria. In that same poll, the band took home Best Local Concert of the Year for their "Awakening Tour" efforts. The band continued playing in 2007, becoming very well known in the underground metal scene. After one failed record contract in 2008, the band decided to play gigs in order to fund their first professional album.

=== Anomaly/The Second Awakening Tour (2009–2011) ===
In 2009, Pneuma recorded their album Anomaly at Audio Arte Studios in Costa Rica; they mixed and mastered the record at Sonic Response Productions in Los Angeles, California. Anomaly was released in 2010 along with the video for their song "Dethroned", drawing great reviews from the national and international metal scene. This led to PNEUMA being chosen as opening act for Metallica and Mastodon, in the Costa Rican leg of their World Magnetic Tour. In this concert Pneuma had a standing ovation and acceptance from more than 30,000 screaming fans (this has been Costa Rica’s biggest concert to date). Pneuma also was one of the opening acts in the Whitesnake/Judas Priest concert recently held in San Jose, with approximately 20,000 plus attendees. In 2011, Pneuma went again on their second "AWAKENING TOUR" through different cities in Costa Rica (rural and urban) and also played different big festivals in front of hundreds and even thousands of people. In the same year Pneuma won "Best Metal Composition" at the ACAM awards (National music awards) for "Anomaly" and also took home honors in "Best Sound Engineering" proving that the band is greatly respected locally by the media and music authorities. Pneuma now has confirmed two International tours in 2011 with the booking agency Rebel Music Productions : Mexico (August) and Europe (September – October).

=== Wacken Open Air 2011 ===
Pneuma entered the Wacken Metal Masters Competition for a spot in the Wacken Open Air 2011 festival which is held every year in Germany. After a neck and neck race with GOD: The Barbarian Horde from Romania, Pneuma won the 1st place. The competition was based upon which band received the most votes online by Metal fans all over the world. and just won 1st place in a Worldwide online voting contest Metal Masters to earn a spot in this year’s Wacken Open Air 2011. Pneuma released the video of their second single "Crazed Apocalyptic Wave" in October 2011.

The Game / Recent Achievements (2017–present)

In 2017, Pneuma recorded their album The Game at Conquista Records and Miut Audio, later mastered at SoloHits Recording Studios. Released independently on September 1, 2017, the album featured nine tracks including “Slave,” “Changes,” “Gorilla on Opium,” and “Watership Down.” Norman Mena provided drums on this release, alongside Antonio Masís on bass and vocals, Daniel Vega on guitar and chorus, and José Sibaja on guitar. The record was praised for its progressive metal arrangements and lyrical depth, further cementing Pneuma’s reputation in Costa Rica’s heavy music scene.

In May 2023, Pneuma premiered the official video for “Gorilla on Opium” and announced their new drummer, Emanuel Calderón Sánchez, marking a new era for the band, bringing renewed energy to their live performances and expanding their lineup with experience from other metal projects (Live Drummer for Tim Ripper (Ex-Judas Priest), Michale Graves (Ex-Misfits), The Movement in Codes, Sight of Emptiness, Nostoc, Aeons of Silence, Ominous:Extant and others) Pneuma has continued to perform at national and international festivals and strengthen their digital presence, maintaining their role as one of Costa Rica’s most enduring and respected metal acts. They are currently in the process of working on a new material to be released in the following months/year.

== Members ==
Current

- Antonio Masís - Bass, Vocals (2002–present)
- Emanuel Calderón Sanchez - Drums (2023-present)
- Daniel Vega - Guitars (2010–present)
- José Sibaja - Guitars (2010–present)

Past members

- Cristian Esquivel - Drums (2002–2012)
- Marco Sansonetti - Guitars (2002–2010)
- Ricardo Céspedes - Vocals (2002–2010)
- Andrés Angulo - Drums (2012–2013)
- Norman Mena - Drums (?—2012; 2013—2022)

== Discography ==
Studio albums

- A Run Through (2004)
- Anomaly (2010)
- The Game (2017)
