= Evolución (band) =

- Origin: San José, Costa Rica
- Genres: Rock en Español; Alternative rock Music of Costa Rica
- Years active: 1995–present
- Members: Balerom; Moldo; Wash
- Website: Official Website

Evolución (English: Evolution), also known as Evolución Sentimiento Infinito, is a Costa Rican rock band formed in 1995 in San José, Costa Rica. The group is considered one of the most influential bands in the history of Costa Rican rock, especially during the late 1990s and early 2000s.

Led by singer and guitarist Andrés de la Espriella "Balerom", Evolución developed a large following through independent work, live performances and constant activity within Costa Rica's underground rock scene. The band's music combines elements of alternative rock, hard rock and melodic rock, with lyrics focused on themes such as love, heartbreak, social criticism, personal experiences and everyday life.

Throughout their career, Evolución has maintained an independent approach, managing most of their recordings and releases despite receiving offers from record companies. Their growth through live performances became an important example of the expansion of Costa Rican rock beyond traditional commercial channels.

== History ==
=== Formation and early years (1995–1998) ===
Evolución was formed in early 1995 by Andrés de la Espriella "Balerom", former member of the band Amplexus, on vocals and guitar. He was later joined by Camilo Pavez "Moldo" (formerly of Flores Muertas) on bass and Federico Eichler "Ácido" on drums. After Eichler's departure, Luis Fernando Ruiz "Wash", formerly of Las Tetas de Ofelia, became the band's drummer.

During their first years, the group developed its sound within Costa Rica's underground rock movement of the mid-1990s. The band focused on composing and recording songs that would later become part of their debut album, Música para sentir.

Evolución performed their first official concert on November 22, 1996, at La Bodega in Costa Rica. The performance featured Balerom, Moldo, Wash and guitarist Pepe, marking the beginning of the band's live career.

In 1997, the band presented Música para sentir at Sala Garbo, located at Teatro Laurence Olivier. The concert was performed as a trio and attracted approximately 220 people. According to Balerom, the show became one of the most important moments in Evolución's history because it was the first time the audience sang their songs back to the band.

Songs such as Dr. Hongo y compañía, El mañanero and Superhéroe de su propia fantasía became early fan favorites. That same year, Evolución participated in the first edition of Rock Fest Costa Rica, held at the Teatro Popular Melico Salazar, where they were selected as one of the opening acts. Due to the success of their performance, the band was invited again to participate in the 1998 edition of the festival.

=== Oscuridad evolutiva and Mexico period (1998–1999) ===
At the end of 1998, Evolución entered a temporary hiatus. The band closed this stage with the farewell concert "Oscuridad evolutiva", held on July 31, 1998, at the Teatro Popular Melico Salazar in San José.

After the concert, the band traveled to Mexico in search of new opportunities and contacts within the Latin American music scene. After approximately one month, the group returned to Costa Rica, while Balerom later traveled back to Mexico individually to study composition.

During this period, Balerom met guitarist Walther Kleinert, who would later become an invited guitarist for Evolución after returning to Costa Rica.

The band performed another farewell concert on March 14, 1999, at Cine Universal, with Alma Bohemia and Gandhi as supporting acts.

=== Return and consolidation (2000–2001) ===
After their period of inactivity and their experiences in Mexico, Evolución returned to Costa Rica in 2000 and resumed their activity within the national rock scene. The band made their official return at Rock Fest 2000, held at the Amphitheater of Hotel Herradura in Belén, Heredia, performing in front of more than 5,000 people.

Rock Fest became one of the most important events for the development of Costa Rican rock, bringing together established and emerging national bands. The festival later gained greater recognition through media exposure, including coverage by music channels such as MTV Latin America, helping increase the visibility of Costa Rican artists.

Following their return, Evolución began the "ReEvolución" tour, which represented a new stage in the band's career. During this period, the group worked on their second studio album, Absorbiendo la magia, recorded at The Closet Studios and produced by Alberto Ortiz.

Released in 2001, Absorbiendo la magia represented a major change in the band's musical direction. Compared with their debut album, Música para sentir, the record introduced darker atmospheres, heavier guitar arrangements and more introspective lyrics, while maintaining the melodic identity of the group.

The album included songs such as Esclavo, which became one of Evolución's most recognized songs. The first presentation of the album took place in December 2000 at the bar El Escondite, while the official release concerts were held on March 16 and 17, 2001, at Teatro Eugene O'Neill in San José.

Later that year, Evolución performed at Rock Fest 2001 at the Hotel Herradura amphitheater, continuing their position as one of the leading bands in the Costa Rican rock scene.

In 2003, Absorbiendo la magia was reissued with remastering completed in Argentina by Eduardo Pereira, known for his work with the Argentine band Bersuit Vergarabat.

=== Mundo de fantasía and international recognition (2002–2003) ===
In 2002, Evolución traveled to Buenos Aires, Argentina, to record their third studio album, Mundo de fantasía. The album was produced by Oscar Righi and Pepe Céspedes, members of the Argentine band Bersuit Vergarabat.

The album represented a new stage in the band's career, introducing a more melodic and accessible sound while preserving their alternative rock influences. This musical direction helped Evolución reach a wider audience and become one of the most recognized Costa Rican rock groups of the early 2000s.

The single Voy por ella became one of the band's biggest successes. Its music video was directed by Chilean filmmaker Esteban Zabala and received significant exposure through national media and music platforms.

Other songs from the album, including Misterios y pasiones, Así, Del mar and Amor con transparencia, became important parts of the band's catalog. The success of Mundo de fantasía led to increased attention from national media, which described the rapid growth of Evolución's popularity in Costa Rica.

=== Opening for Red Hot Chili Peppers (2002) ===
One of the most significant moments in Evolución's career occurred on October 2, 2002, when the band was selected as the opening act for the first concert of Red Hot Chili Peppers in Costa Rica.

The concert was held at Estadio Eladio Rosabal Cordero in Heredia as part of the Red Hot Chili Peppers' By the Way tour. The event attracted approximately 13,000 people and became one of the most remembered international rock concerts in Costa Rican history.

Evolución performed before the Californian band, becoming one of the few Costa Rican rock groups to open for an internationally recognized act of that scale. The concert increased the band's national recognition and reinforced their position as one of the main representatives of Costa Rican rock.

The event became especially remembered because of the heavy rain that affected the stadium during the concert, turning the field into mud and creating an atmosphere often compared by fans to a "Costa Rican Woodstock".

=== Major concerts and collaborations (2003) ===
During 2003, Evolución continued expanding their presence through major concerts and collaborations within Costa Rica.

The band participated in VOXPOP Fanta, held on July 12, 2003, at the Polideportivo Monserrat in Alajuela. The event brought together national and international artists and became one of the largest concerts involving Costa Rican rock during that period.

Evolución also participated in Rocktico, a festival that brought together several important groups from the Costa Rican rock scene.

Later in 2003, Evolución joined forces with Gandhi for the "Gira sin cabeza", a nationwide tour designed to present both groups as equal acts rather than following a traditional opening act format.

During the concerts, both bands performed songs from each other's repertoires and finished the shows with all musicians on stage. The performances included songs such as Esclavo, Quisieras, El mañanero and Hacia adentro.

The tour traveled through different locations across Costa Rica, including San Pedro, Santa Bárbara, Palmares, Grecia, Tamarindo and Playa Flamingo in Guanacaste, becoming one of the most notable collaborations between two major Costa Rican rock bands during the early 2000s.

During this period, Evolución also shared stages with emerging national groups, including Elemento, who participated as a supporting act in some concerts involving Evolución and Gandhi. These appearances helped Elemento gain visibility within the Costa Rican undergroundalternative rock scene and became part of the band's early development, with hits like Al Otro Lado or Luz Fugaz.

=== Dígalo and continued success (2004) ===
In 2004, Evolución released Dígalo, their fourth studio album. The album continued the musical direction established with Mundo de fantasía while introducing a more polished production style.

The album was produced by Andrés de la Espriella "Balerom" and mastered by Tom Baker at Precision Mastering Studios in Hollywood, California. The title track, Dígalo, became one of the band's most recognized songs and received significant attention due to its animated 3D music video.

Other songs from the album, including Ni vengo, ni voy and San Valentontín, also received music videos and helped maintain the band's presence in Costa Rica's rock scene.

During this period, Evolución also expanded its international connections by working with the Chilean agency Bonkó, which represented the band's activities in South America.

=== Sentimiento antisocial (2005) ===
In 2005, Evolución released Sentimiento antisocial, an album based on songs originally recorded during the band's early demo period between 1995 and 1998.

Unlike the more accessible sound of Mundo de fantasía and Dígalo, the album presented a darker and more aggressive style, returning to some of the band's underground influences. The record explored themes of social criticism, frustration and personal conflict.

The album represented a return to the band's early identity and showed a different side of Evolución's musical development.

=== Amor artificial (2007) ===
In 2007, Evolución released Amor artificial, one of the band's most ambitious studio albums.

The record presented a more mature sound, combining melodic elements with more elaborate arrangements and a wider variety of musical influences. The first single, No me diga, received a music video and became one of the main songs associated with the album.

Amor artificial became one of Evolución's most successful releases, reaching third place among the best-selling albums in Costa Rica during 2007.

=== Evolución en vivo and international performances (2009–2010) ===
On August 27 and 28, 2009, Evolución recorded their first official live album at El Observatorio in San José.

Titled Evolución en vivo, the album was released on November 13, 2009, and included 20 songs representing fourteen years of the band's career. The release included songs from albums such as Música para sentir, Absorbiendo la magia, Mundo de fantasía, Dígalo and Amor artificial.

In October 2009, the band filmed the music video for En el éxtasis, a song originally written during their early period in 1995. Directed by Esteban Zabala, the video showcased the band's live performance.

In 2010, Evolución performed in Germany, including concerts in Hamburg. These performances represented one of the band's most notable international appearances and marked the group's presence outside Latin America.

=== National Stadium inauguration concert (2011) ===
On April 2, 2011, Evolución participated in the Festival de Música Nacional, a large-scale concert organized for the inauguration of the new National Stadium of Costa Rica.

The performance, known as San Valentontín, brought together several generations of Costa Rican musicians. The festival lasted more than ten hours and included more than 26 national artists and groups, including Gandhi, Percance, Akasha, Escats, Éditus, Time's Forgotten, Bernal Villegas and Pato Barraza.

The event became one of the largest celebrations of Costa Rican music held at the new stadium and highlighted the importance of national artists within the country's cultural scene.

=== Viaje salvaje (2013) ===
In 2013, Evolución released Viaje salvaje, their seventh studio album.

The album represented a new creative stage for the band, maintaining their alternative rock identity while incorporating new production techniques and musical influences. Songs such as La máquina and Penetra mi alma continued the band's exploration of melodic and introspective songwriting.

=== Hiatus, digital catalog and return (2014–2019) ===
After Viaje salvaje, Evolución entered a period of reduced activity. Although the band did not officially announce a permanent separation, its members focused on individual projects.

Balerom continued developing his solo career, while other members participated in different musical activities.

In 2017, much of Evolución's catalog became available through digital platforms such as Spotify, allowing new listeners to access the band's discography.

In 2019, Evolución returned to the stage with a concert at Teatro Popular Melico Salazar in San José. The performance celebrated the band's legacy and reunited members connected to different stages of their career.

=== 30th anniversary (2026) ===
In 2026, Evolución celebrated three decades since the beginning of their career.

The anniversary recognized the band's trajectory from the Costa Rican underground rock scene of the 1990s to becoming one of the most recognized rock groups in the country.

As part of the celebration, Evolución held a commemorative concert on September 5, 2026, at Mercadito La California in San José, Costa Rica, celebrating 30 years of activity and the band's contribution to Costa Rican rock.

== Members ==
=== Current members ===
Member	Role	Years active
Andrés de la Espriella "Balerom"	Lead vocals, guitar	1995–present
Camilo Pavez "Moldo"	Bass, vocals	1995–present
Luis Fernando Ruiz "Wash"	Drums, percussion	1995–present
Felipe Damazzio	Keyboards, piano	2019–present
Christian "Chris" Román	Second guitar	Present

=== Former members and guest musicians ===
Member	Role	Years active
Pepe	Guitar	1995
Luis Arenas	Guitar	1997–1998
Walther Kleinert	Guitar	2000–2001
Marco Chinchilla	Guitar	2001
Luis Miguel Araya	Trumpet	2001
Pablo León	Keyboards	2001
Mauricio Guidi	Guitar	2003
Mario Solano	Guitar	2004
Ricardo Ramírez	Violin (guest musician on Amor artificial)	2007

== Discography ==
=== Studio albums ===
Year	Album information
1997	Música para sentir
2001	Absorbiendo la magia
2003	Mundo de fantasía
2004	Dígalo
2005	Sentimiento antisocial (Reissue of the unreleased 1998 demo)
2007	Amor artificial
2013	Viaje salvaje

=== Live albums and compilations ===
Year	Album information
2005	Sentimiento infinito (EP)
2009	Evolución en vivo

== Videography ==
Year	Video	Director
2002	"Voy por ella"	Esteban Zabala
2003	"Misterios y pasiones"	Esteban Zabala
2004	"Dígalo"	Alfonso Peralta
2005	"San Valentontín"	Esteban Zabala
2006	"Ni vengo, ni voy"	Luis Naguil
2007	EPK, Amor artificial	Matías Tapia
2007	"No me diga"	—
2010	"En el éxtasis"	Esteban Zabala
2013	"La Máquina"	Matías Tapia
2013	"Penetra mi alma"	Matías Tapia
