= Daniela Carpio =

Di WAV
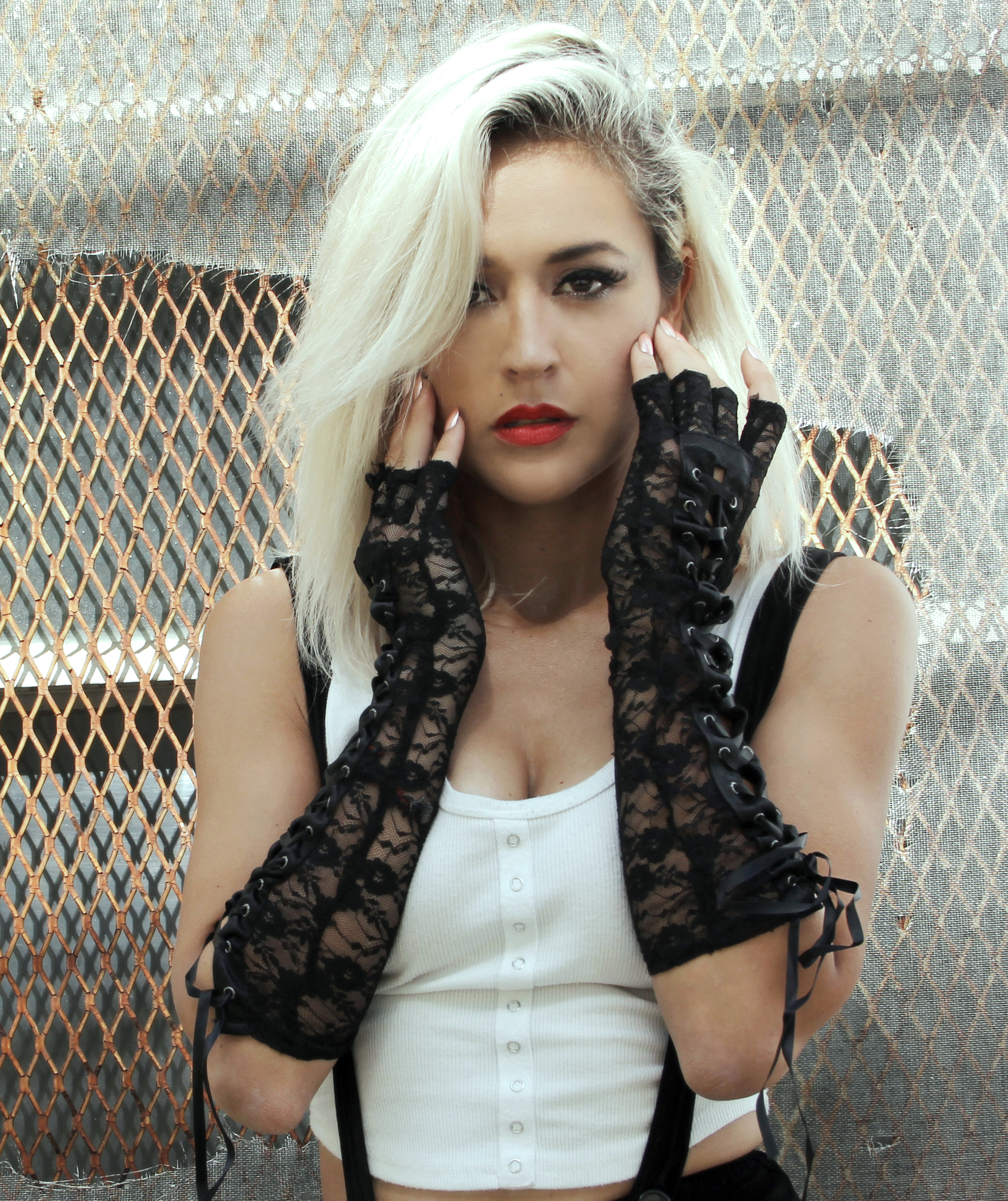

Background information
- Born: Daniela Carpio Fischer
- Origin: Guatemala; Switzerland; United States
- Genres: Alternative; Electronic; Experimental; Rock
- Occupations: Singer-Songwriter, musician, actor, visual artist, director, producer
- Instruments: Vocals, piano, guitar
- Years active: 2008–present
- Labels: ONErpm, Afonico Music, Sony Music Latin

Daniela Carpio, better known by her stage name Di WAV, is a Guatemalan-Swiss-American singer-songwriter, musician, visual artist, director and producer. A Latin Alternative act, her music has emerged as a fusion of indie pop, rock, electronic and experimental music. Di WAV sings both in English and Spanish.

== Early life ==
Born Daniela Carpio Fischer was born and raised in Guatemala City. Di WAV wrote her first song at age 14 and began acting and modeling. In 2003 she moved to Panama City, Panama, where she enrolled in college and continued her music studies, acquiring knowledge in the production and direction field. In 2007 she received a bachelor's degree in Communications from Universidad Católica Santa María La Antigua, and moved back to Guatemala. She started singing professionally in 2008.

== Career ==
=== Television ===
On the year 2006, Carpio debuted as a host on the TV show Solo Caballos, aired by Medcom Network. She worked on the show for two seasons.

In 2011, she lands the role as Pepsi image for the "Pepsi Music" media campaign in Guatemala, and works as a host on the TV Program Pepsi Music Challenge TV, along with Venezuelan presenter Nelson Bustamante. The show was aired by Albavision.

She later joined the TV Azteca Guatemala team in 2014, as a host on the TV Programs "Ventaneando Aca" and "Academia Kids" (Transmission).

=== Digital Media ===
On 2015, Carpio moves to the United States searching for bigger career opportunities. She lands a job as a producer / host on Spanish Broadcasting System's digital app LaMusica. She produced and hosted the shows "Alterlatino" and "#TBT" for two seasons.

=== Music ===
==== 2008–2011: Career beginnings and S.U.P.E.R. (Sexy, urban, Pop, Electro, Retro) ====
In 2008 she met Eduardo Santella, DJ, producer and engineer, with whom she recorded the song “Tell Me". She later records four more singles in the electronic genre, working with Santella and other Dj´s. On November 26, 2010, she releases her debut album S.U.P.E.R (Sexy, Urban, Pop, Electro, Retro), influenced by pop, urban and retro sounds. Later that year, MTV Latinoamerica, chooses her song "S.U.P.E.R." to be a part of the official soundtrack of their new original series Popland.

==== 2012–2015: El Mundo Me Hizo Así ====
In 2012 she started working on her second album, produced by Juan Luis Lopera, Rudy Bethancourt and Santiago Carvajal (Fainal). Her first single "Lejos" was released in 2013, and reached No. 1 for several weeks on the Guatemalan music charts. This single was chosen to be a part of the official soundtrack of MTV Latinoamerica original series Niñas Mal 2. In 2014 she collaborated with the Colombian group Alkilados on the song "Corazón Quebrado," obtaining international success. On June 22, 2015, she released her second album, El Mundo Me Hizo Así.

==== 2018: The Birth of Di WAV ====
In 2018, after a two-year break from music, Carpio met Latin Grammy nominated producer/songwriter Marthin Chan with whom she worked on her third album under the label Afonico Music. The album's first single "Dominos" was announced for release in September 2018 with a new artistic identity: Di WAV.

On December 6, 2019, she released her conceptual EP Masoquista, containing six tracks, under the label Afonico Music. Her song "Vampira en La Luz" is chosen as part of Billboard's playlist "Viva Friday", a compilation of the best Latin songs chosen by the curators of Billboard Latin. Masoquista landed #18 of 2019's most streamed Guatemalan albums on Spotify.

==== 2020 - 2021: "Despierta: Visual Album" ====
Di WAV's EP "Despierta" was released on February 4, 2021. The four track album was produced by Grammy winner Reuven Amiel and Latin Grammy nominee Marthin Chan, during the 2020 pandemic.

The first single of "Despierta", "Mente Criminal", charted No.4 in the Guatemalan national charts for several weeks. The album also includes a cover of Depeche Mode's "Precious."

A short film/visual of the album titled "Despierta: Pensamientos de Cuarentena," was written and directed by Di WAV and released on May 21, 2021.

==== 2022 - 2024: Exploring New Sounds ====
Di WAV continued to release music, experimenting with a more indie sound and diving deep into rock n roll. she reached the quarterfinals at the Audacy Radio Opening Act Competition by popular vote in the United States. In August 2023, her song “Singular” was chosen by the Mexican radio station Reactor 105.7FM to be part of its selection of premieres for the month. She also released singles "Morfina", "Ataúd" "México" and "En Cada Átomo".

DI WAV won the 2024 Estela Award for “Best Rock Song” with the song “Singular” and in 2023 won the Estela Award for “Best Rock Song” with its song “Ataúd.

On July 12th 2024 she released her first LP "SURREAL", produced by five time Latin Grammy nominee Marthin Chan and Grammy Winner Reuven Amiel.

== Discography ==
=== Albums ===
- SURREAL (2024)
- Despierta (2021)
- Masoquista (2019)
- ELECTRO RETRO (2010/2022) / Catalog

== Awards and nominations ==
=== Premios Estela ===
Year	Work Nominated	Category	Result
2025	Songwriter of the Year	Songwriter of the Year	Winner
2024	Singular Ft. Velasquez	Best Rock Song	Winner
2023	Ataúd	Best Rock Song	Winner
2025	Marionetas Ft. Casa de Kello	Best Rock Song	Nominated
2025	Marionetas Ft. Casa de Kello	Best Indie Song	Nominated
2025	Dominos 24	Best Rock Song	Nominated
2024	Amanecer Ft. Soapbox	Best Rock Song	Nominated
2024	En Cada Átomo	Best Female Pop Song	Nominated
2024	Morfina	Best Indie Song	Nominated
2024	Amanecer Ft. Soapbox	Best Featuring	Nominated

=== Premios 40 Principales ===
|-

Year	Work Nominated	Category	Result
2011	S.U.P.E.R.	Best Guatemalan Act	Nominated

== Filmography ==
=== Film ===
Year	Title	Role	Song
2019	Nebaj (film)	Soundtrack	El Otro Lado del Cielo

=== Television ===
Year	Title	Role	Song
2013	Niñas Mal 2	Soundtrack	Lejos
2011	Popland	Soundtrack	S.U.P.E.R

== Previous Work Released ==
=== Singles ===
- La Vida No Es La Misma (2015)
- Contigo Quiero Estar (2015)
- Corazon Quebrado ft. Alkilados (2014)
- Que No Pare La Fiesta (2014)
- Pierdo La Razón (2014)
- Me Fui (2013)
- Lejos (2013)
- ¿Donde Está? Ft. Ignacio Borrel (2012)
- No te Conozco (2011)
- Back to Roots (2010)
- "Timbaolize Ft. Ronxxx" (2010)

=== Albums ===
- El Mundo Me Hizo Así. (2015)
- S.U.P.E.R. (2010)

=== Collaborations ===
- "El Color de tu Voz" Ft. Kronovox (2020)
- Corazon Quebrado ft. Alkilados (2014)
- "Timbaolize Ft. Ronxxx" (2010)
- "Closer to Me Ft. DJ Ronxxx & Boggian" (2010)
- "Give Away Ft. DJ Ronxxx" (2010)
- "So Sexy Ft. Santiago Niño & DJ Ronxxx" (2008)
- "Tell Me Ft. Santiago Niño & DJ Ronxxx" (2008)
