= Escats =

Band from Costa Rica

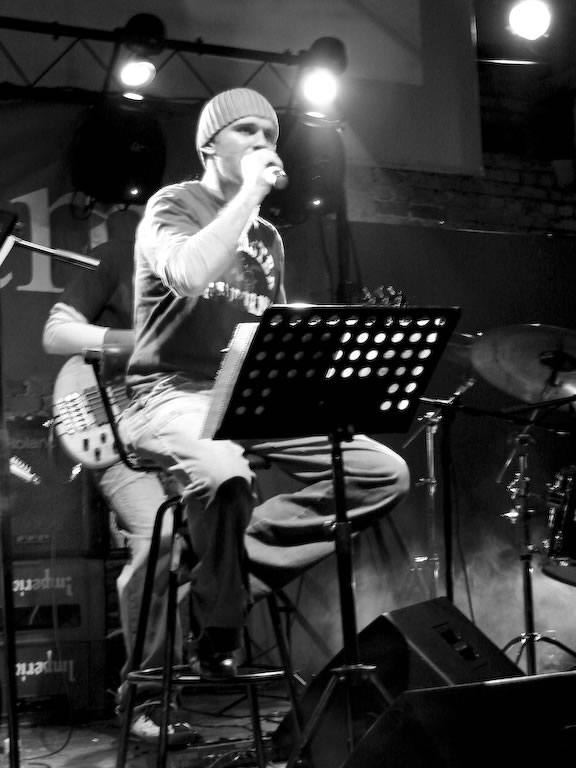
- Escats concert; Luis Alonso Naranjo in foreground

Background information
- Origin: San José, Costa Rica
- Genres: Pop
- Labels: Universal Music Centro America
- Members: Luis Alonso Naranjo; Kin Rivera Jr. Felipe Contreras
- Past members: Nelson Segura
- Website: http://www.escats.com

Escats is a band from Costa Rica and it is composed of three members: Luis Alonso Naranjo (Piano, Lead Vocals, Producer, Writer), Kin Rivera Jr. (Drums, co-producer) and Felipe Contreras (Bass Guitar)

== About the band ==
Escats is characterised by their facility in interpreting several musical genres, including jazz, pop, rock, Latin music, Afro-Cuban music, and their fusions. Together, the band has worked on albums with many artists, such as Arnoldo Castillo, Tatiana Gomez, Marta Fonseca, Allan Guzman, Tito Oses, Jazz Garbo, Fusion Caribe, Juan Carlos Ureña, Robert Aguilar, Sasha Campbell, Squad, The Neotics, Porpartes, Geovanny Escalante, Maf, Fabricio Alvarado, Adrian Goizueta, Enoch Samuels, Ares, Humberto Vargas, Enrique Castillo, among others.

They have won 3 ACAM awards in 2007 for their first album. Kin Rivera Jr was nominated to 2007 Latin Grammy with the album "Solo Paz." Luis Alonso is the lead singer for the international project where he has worked with musicians such as Arturo Sandoval, Gonzalo Rubalcaba, Ed Calle, Geovanny Hidalgo, Lee Levin, Richie Flores, Roberto Roena, among others. Kin Rivera Jr. also appears in this project. They also won 2 ACAM awards in 2011.

Escats has played its music in many concerts with Sin Bandera, Kudai, Chayanne, Cristian Castro, Franco De Vita, Alejandro Fernández, Alejandro Sanz, Juanes, among other main international figures in the Latin music.

== Awards ==
Escats was signed by Sony BMG in September 2007. Their first album "Para quien quiera que seas, donde quiera que estes" received a Gold disc award from Sony BMG because they sold more than 7,000 CDs only in Costa Rica. Now, Escats was signed by Universal Music (CA) and they released their DVD "Para que estes, en el Concierto" in October 2008.

== Discography ==
- Para quien quiera que seas, donde quiera que estés - Debut album - 2006
- Manual práctico del amor y desamor - Produced by Benny Faccone in Los Angeles - 2011

== DVDs ==
- Para que estés... en el Concierto - Recorded Live in San José, Costa Rica
