= Los Premios 40 Principales 2011 =

Spanish music awards ceremony

- Date: December 9, 2011
- Venue: Palacio de Deportes de la Comunidad de Madrid
- Host: Tony Aguilar
- Network: Cuatro (Spain); A&E Network (Latin America)

This was the sixth edition of Los Premios 40 Principales, created by Los 40 Principales to honor the best in Spanish and international music. It was also the last to feature the national American categories, since Los Premios 40 Principales América would be created for 2012.

The event was held at the Palacio de Deportes de la Comunidad de Madrid.

== Performers ==
Artist(s)	Song(s)
Enrique Iglesias	"I Like How It Feels" "I Like It" "Tonight (I'm Lovin' You)"
Alexandra Stan	"Mr. Saxobeat" "Get Back (ASAP)"
The Wanted	"Glad You Came"
Amaia Montero	"Caminando"
El Pescao	"Castillo de arena" "Buscando el sol"
Marta Sánchez	"Get Together"
Juan Magan	"Bailando por ahí" "No sigue modas"
La Oreja de Van Gogh	"Cometas por el cielo" "El último vals" "La niña que llora en tus fiestas"
Pablo Alborán; Malú	"Perdóname" (Alborán) "Solamente tú" "Blanco y negro" (Malú)
Mohombi	"Coconut Tree"
Shakira	"Antes de las seis" "Devoción" "Loca"
Jessie J	"Price Tag" "Domino"
Carlos Jean	"Gimme the Base" (with M-AND-Y) "Pop" (with La Oreja de Van Gogh) "Historia de terror" (with El Pescao) "Lead the Way" (with Electric Nana)

== Awards ==
=== Best Song ===
- Juan Magan (featuring Pitbull and El Cata) — "Bailando Por Ahí"
- Enrique Iglesias (featuring Ludacris and DJ Frank E) — "Tonight (I'm Lovin' You)"
- La Musicalité — "4 Elementos"
- Carlos Jean — "Lead the Way"
- Malú — "Blanco y Negro"

=== Best Video ===
- Enrique Iglesias (featuring Ludacris and DJ Frank E) — "Tonight (I'm Lovin' You)"
- Ragdog — "Tu y Yo"
- Huecco — "Dame Vida"
- Virginia Labuat — "The Time is Now"
- Pignoise — "Cama Vacía"

=== Best Album ===
- Dani Martín — Pequeño
- Melendi — Volvamos a Empezar
- Maldita Nerea — Fácil
- Pablo Alborán — Pablo Alborán
- La Oreja de Van Gogh — Cometas por el cielo

=== Best Act ===
- Enrique Iglesias
- Dani Martín
- El Pescao
- Maldita Nerea
- La Oreja de Van Gogh

=== Best New Act ===
- Labuat
- Juan Magan
- Pablo Alborán
- The Monomes
- Carlos Jean

=== Best Tour ===
- Maldita Nerea — Gira Fácil
- El Pescao — Tour Nada-Lógico
- Dani Martín — Gira Pequeño
- Maná — Tour Drama y Luz
- Melendi — Gira Volvamos a Empezar

=== Best Dance Act ===
- Enrique Iglesias (featuring Ludacris and DJ Frank E) — "Tonight (I'm Lovin' You)"
- Juan Magan (featuring Pitbull and El Cata) — "Bailando Por El Mundo"
- Marta Sánchez (featuring D-Mol) — "Get Together"
- Carlos Jean (featuring Electric Nana) — "Lead the Way"
- Dani Moreno (featuring Jackie Sagana) — "Domino"

=== Best Argentine Act ===
- Miranda!
- Axel
- Dread Mar I
- Tan Biónica
- El Original

=== Best Chilean Act ===
- Mc Billeta
- Eyci and Cody
- Francisca Valenzuela
- Los Vásquez
- Los Bunkers

=== Best Colombian Act ===
- J Balvin
- Pasabordo
- Jiggy Dramma
- Cali & El Dandee
- The Mills

=== Best Costa Rican Act ===
- Los Govinda
- Garbanzos
- Los Ajenos
- Akasha
- Cocofunka

=== Best Ecuadorian Act ===
- Daniel Betancourth
- Karla Kanora
- Daniel Páez
- Brito
- Papá Chango

=== Best Guatemalan Act ===
- Daniela Carpio
- Malacates Trébol Shop
- Gaby Moreno
- El Tambor de la Tribu
- Los Reyes Vagos

=== Best Mexican Act ===
- Paty Cantú
- Belanova
- Maná
- Ximena Sariñana
- Zoé

=== Best Panamanian Act ===
- Los Rabanes
- Os Almirantes
- Aldo Ranks
- RD Maravilla
- Joey Montana

=== Best Latin Song ===
- Shakira — "Loca"
- Shakira — "Rabiosa"
- Don Omar (featuring Lucenzo) — "Danza Kuduro"
- Carlos Baute — "Quién te Quiere Como Yo"
- Maná — "Lluvia al Corazón"

=== Best Latin Act ===
- Maná
- Don Omar
- Carlos Baute
- Shakira
- Ricky Martin

=== Best International Song ===
- Jennifer Lopez (featuring Pitbull) — "On the Floor"
- Pitbull (featuring Ne-Yo, Afrojack, and Nayer) — "Give Me Everything"
- Rihanna — "S&M"
- LMFAO — "Party Rock Anthem"
- Alexandra Stan — "Mr. Saxobeat"

=== Best International Act ===
- Rihanna
- Pitbull
- Katy Perry
- Britney Spears
- Bruno Mars

== Presenters ==
- Patricia Montero and Adrián Lastra — presented Best New Act
- Cristina Boscá — introduced Alexandra Stan
- Manu Carreño and Ponseti — presented Best Guatemalan Act and Best International Act
- Laura Esquivel and Jaime Olías — presented Best Argentine Act and Best Video
- Frank Blanco — introduced Amaia Montero
- Iván Massagué and Javier Hernández — presented Best Costa Rican Act
- María Adánez and Jesús Olmedo — presented Best Latin Act
- Tito Rabat and Axel Pons — presented Best Chilean Act and Best International Song
- Rubén Ochandiano and Óscar "Machupichu" Reyes — presented Best Tour and Best Ecuadorian Act
- Alexandra Jiménez and Tania Llasera — presented Best Latin Song
- Antonio Velázquez and Nerea Garmendia — presented Best Guatemalan Act
- Úrsula Corberó and Luis Fernández — presented Best Colombian Act and Best Dance Act
- Berta Collado and Jaime Cantizano — presented Best Mexican Act and Best Act
- Fonsi Nieto and Chenoa — presented Best Album
- Antonio Orozco and Manuel Carrasco — presented Best Song
