= Los 40 =

Spanish radio station network

The current Los 40 logo

Los 40 (stylized as LOS40, formerly Los 40 Principales, Spanish: Los Cuarenta) is a Spanish & English Top 40-themed music radio station that broadcasts current and recent music, primarily focusing on genres such as pop, dance, electropop, Electro Latin, and Reggaeton. The brand is operated in various Spanish-speaking countries by PRISA Radio. It is recognized as the first thematic radio station in Spain, with an audience of almost three million listeners. Originating as a music show at Radio Madrid (now Cadena SER) in 1966, it transitioned into an independent radio station in 1979.

Thanks to the success of the program and the increase in the number of FM stations and receivers, Los 40 gradually expanded its daily broadcast duration, eventually reaching 24 hours of daily broadcasting in 1979 on the new radiofórmula 40 stations, still part of Cadena SER. In 1985, Los 40 began broadcasting via satellite. During the 1987-1988 season, Los 40 became an independent radio station known as Cadena 40, while still under the control of Grupo PRISA, the parent company of both Cadena 40 and Cadena SER.

Los 40 also operates in ten other countries, establishing its presence as a significant international music radio station in Spain and Latin America. The station primarily targets a demographic of individuals aged 12 to 30 years old.

The format of Los 40 is characterized by a youthful and dynamic style, incorporating a casual language that appeals to a young audience. The station emphasizes both music and musical information, as well as the presentation of songs.

Los 40 can be accessed through FM dials, national DTT broadcasting, streaming services, and mobile applications.

== Broadcast ==
LOS40 stations are broadcast in: Argentina, Chile, Colombia, Costa Rica, Ecuador, Spain, United States, Guatemala, Mexico, Panama and the Dominican Republic.

The stations predominantly play contemporary hit music in Spanish and English contemporary hit music, featuring a mix of American, Latin American, Pan-European, and British artists. The music selection varies by region, with stations in Mexico and Panama stations focusing more on European and English-language music, whereas Chile and Costa Rica feature more reggaeton and bachata.

== History ==
Los 40 Principales began as a music program on Cadena SER's Radio Madrid. In 1965, Spain's Ministry of Information and Tourism mandated FM station launches, leading to a focus on music programming due to production costs. The following year, Rafael Revert was tasked by Cadena SER to create a music show for a younger audience, resulting in the creation of the 40 Principales chart. The first show aired on 18 July 1966, with "Monday, Monday" by The Mamas & the Papas topping the inaugural chart.

Initially, it was broadcast on 10 stations within the network. The program's duration expanded over time, starting with two hours, then increasing to four hours, and eventually to eight hours when it transitioned to a weekly edition on Saturdays.

The program was pre-recorded and distributed to Cadena SER stations across Spain, which broadcast it simultaneously at the designated time. The success of "Los 40 Principales," particularly among young audiences, led to an increase in programming hours and the development of its unique style, known as the "40 Style." This style is characterized by a youthful, casual language that emphasizes both music and musical information, as well as the presentation of songs.

The use of Onda Media was crucial for transmitting the "40 Style," as FM radio was less commonly used at the time. On Saturday afternoons, Onda Media stations broadcast eight hours of "Los 40," during which listeners could vote for the number one song.

In 1979, 40 Principales became a dedicated radio network. The network started satellite broadcasts across Spain in 1985 and expanded into Latin America in the 2000s.

In 1990, the chart show extended to television through Canal+ followed by the launch of 40 Principales TV in 1998. This channel continued until its closure in September 2017.

=== Timeline ===
- 1966: On 18 July, the radio program Los 40 Principales is launched on Cadena SER's Radio Madrid. This program marks the inception of the "40 list" and is the predecessor to the current show Del 40 al 1. The first song to achieve the number one spot on this new chart is "Monday, Monday" by The Mamas & the Papas. Following its debut, Los 40 Principales quickly expanded to ten additional Cadena SER stations, broadening its reach across Spain.
- 1979: Los 40 Principales evolves into a pioneering radio format by inaugurating its first exclusive stations dedicated solely to broadcasting the program. While these stations specialized in the Los 40 content, they remained an integral part of the Cadena SER network. This development marks a significant expansion in the program's delivery, allowing for more focused and continuous music broadcasting under the Los 40 brand.
- 1985: On 2 November, Los 40 Principales celebrates a major milestone with its 1,000th week on air. This special week sees "Dancing In The Street" by David Bowie and Mick Jagger climb to Number 1 on the chart. Additionally, in 1985, Los 40 begins satellite broadcasting, significantly expanding its reach to cover the entire nation of Spain. This technological advancement allows the program to deliver its content more broadly and consistently across the country.
- 1987: The radio stations operating under the Los 40 Principales brand achieve independence from Cadena SER, leading to the establishment of the network as Cadena 40 Principales. This organizational change marks a significant development, allowing the network to operate with more autonomy while still maintaining its core focus on the Top 40 music format.
- 1988: Los 40 Principales achieves a significant milestone by becoming the most listened to radio station in Spain, surpassing conventional radio stations. That year, the network reaches an impressive audience of 5,000,000 listeners, solidifying its status as a major player in Spanish radio broadcasting and marking its widespread appeal across diverse demographic groups.
- 1990: Los 40 Principales takes a significant technological leap by beginning satellite broadcasting. This move makes it the first music station in Spain to distribute content in stereo and digital sound to all its local offices, enhancing the audio quality and listener experience across the country. Additionally, the station's popular chart countdown, Del 40 al 1, transitions to television, being broadcast regularly on Canal+. The TV show is presented by Fernandisco, further expanding the brand's reach and influence in Spanish media.
- 1991: Los 40 Principales marks its 25th anniversary, celebrating a quarter-century of success in radio broadcasting. However, September of the same year sees a significant change in personnel as José Antonio Abellán, one of the station's most famous announcers, departs from Los 40. Abellán's exit marks the end of an era for the station, reflecting both the evolving nature of radio broadcasting and the dynamic careers of its key figures.
- 1992: Rafael Revert, the founder and only director of Los 40 Principales until this point, leaves the station. His departure ushers in a new era under the leadership of Luis Merino, who steers the station in a new direction. Merino focuses on targeting a younger demographic, specifically aiming to capture listeners between the ages of 16 and 25. This strategic shift is part of an effort to rejuvenate the station's audience and appeal to a more youthful market. Additionally, 1992 marks the beginning of digital sound broadcasting for Los 40, further enhancing the audio quality and modernizing the station's offerings.
- 1996: Los 40 Principales makes a significant expansion into the digital age by establishing a presence on the Internet for the first time. This move allows the station to reach a broader, global audience and engage with listeners in new and interactive ways. In the same year, there is a change in leadership as Javier Pons takes over from Luis Merino as the director of the radio network. This transition continues the evolution of Los 40 as it adapts to changing technologies and listener preferences.
- 1997: Los 40 Principales launches "Card 40" in collaboration with La Caixa, a major financial institution in Spain. This partnership introduces a co-branded credit card designed to offer special benefits and promotions linked to the radio station, such as discounts on music purchases and exclusive access to events.
- 1998: On 1 September, Los 40 Principales expands its media footprint by launching 40 TV, a television channel dedicated to music. This new venture is broadcast on the Canal Satélite Digital platform, now known as Canal+. The launch of 40 TV signifies a significant step in broadening the brand's reach, providing a visual component to the popular radio content and offering viewers a mix of music videos, interviews, and live performances directly related to the Top 40 music charts.
- 2000: Jaume Baró takes on the role of managing Los 40 Principales. His leadership marks a new chapter in the station's history as it continues to evolve and adapt to changes in the music industry and listener preferences.
- 2004: Los 40 Principales expands its brand into print media with the launch of Revista 40, a magazine aimed at complementing the radio station’s offerings. This publication is marketed for the first time, providing fans with more in-depth content, including artist interviews, behind-the-scenes features, and extended coverage of the music industry. This move represents a diversification of Los 40’s media presence, aiming to engage its audience through multiple platforms.
- 2005: Los 40 Principales extends its television reach with the transition of 40 Latino, a Spanish-language version of 40 TV, from Digital+ to free-to-air digital terrestrial television (DTT). This shift allows 40 Latino to become accessible to a wider audience, enhancing its visibility and availability across Spain. The channel focuses on Latin and Spanish-language music content.
- 2006: Los 40 Principales celebrates a significant milestone, marking its 40th anniversary. This year is particularly memorable due to a record-breaking event when La Oreja de Van Gogh premieres their single "Muñeca de trapo," which achieves unprecedented audience numbers for the station. Additionally, 2006 sees the inauguration of The 40 Principales Awards, an annual music awards ceremony that recognizes the best in music as voted by the station's listeners.
- 2007: The 40 Principales Awards expand internationally, with Mexico, Guatemala, Costa Rica, Colombia, Argentina, and Chile joining the celebration.
- 2010: On 15 May, Los 40 Principales introduces a significant change to its programming format, a new approach in Spanish radio. The station begins broadcasting uninterrupted blocks of music without advertisements for the first 40 minutes of each hour. The remaining 20 minutes of the hour are then divided into four advertising blocks—two for national broadcasting and two for local content—interspersed with two or three edited songs. This change is designed to maximize listener engagement by providing longer periods of continuous music. In early August, a further adjustment enhances this format, offering 47 minutes of hits each hour.
- 2011: In early October, financial constraints lead PRISA Group, the owner of Cadena SER, Cadena 40 Principales, and Cadena Dial, to cede its digital terrestrial television (DTT) frequency to Mediaset España. Consequently, the three channels cease broadcasting on DTT, although they continue their normal operations on other platforms, including radio and online streaming. This transition marks a significant shift in the distribution strategy for these stations due to economic pressures. Additionally, in May 2011, Los 40 Principales embraces mobile technology by launching a dedicated application available for iPhone, Android, and BlackBerry devices.
- 2012: In November, Los 40 Principales expands its awards program with the inauguration of the Premios 40 Principales América in Veracruz, Mexico. This event marks the independence of the American version of the awards from the original Premios 40 held in Madrid.
- 2014: At the start of the broadcast season, Los 40 Principales introduces significant changes to its morning programming. The popular morning show Anda ya, previously hosted by Xavi Rodríguez, welcomes a new lead in 'Gallo Máximo', who takes over as the morning captain. This change is part of a broader initiative to refresh and energize the morning slot, a crucial time for engaging listeners. Additionally, the Lo+40 brand, which had been dormant, is revived by Xavi Martínez.
- 2015: Despite maintaining its status as the music station with the largest audience in Spain, Los 40 Principales experiences a significant decline in listenership. Over the course of one year, the station loses 17.8% of its audience, reducing its total to 2,940,000 listeners by the end of 2015.
- 2016: As Los 40 Principales celebrates its 50th anniversary, the station undergoes a significant rebranding in May. It drops "Principales" from its name to become simply LOS40. Alongside the new name, a refreshed logo is introduced. The rebranding coincides with the renaming of the station's annual music awards to the Los 40 Music Awards, previously known as the 40 Principales Awards. Eva Cebrián spearheads these changes, marking a new era for LOS40 and its alignment with contemporary music and cultural trends.
- 2017: Despite ongoing efforts to rejuvenate its format and offerings, LOS40 continues to experience a decline in its listener base, recording 2,871,000 listeners by the end of the year. In response to this trend, LOS40 makes several strategic moves to regain its footing in the competitive radio market. Firstly, it returns to broadcasting on Digital Terrestrial Television (DTT) through a partnership with TEN, aiming to expand its reach and accessibility. The station also introduces fresh faces and formats for the new broadcasting season (2016–2017). Los 40 Trending debuts with Arturo Paniagua as the host, and Anda ya sees a new co-presenter, Cristina Boscá, join Dani Moreno. Boscá transitions from Formula 40 to Anda ya, bringing a new dynamic to the popular morning show. The LOS40 app, initially released in 2011, undergoes significant updates. It now includes four new online radio streams and features improved design and reliability. Additionally, the web player is revamped, enhancing user experience with more robust functionality and a modern interface. Between July and August, LOS40 launches the Los 40 Summer Live tour, billed as the largest Spanish musical tour to date. The tour features performances by well-known singers and LOS40's own DJs, creating a major event that blends live music with the station's brand.
- 2018: LOS40 shows signs of recovery, regaining a portion of its audience lost in previous years. By the end of the year, the station reports a listenership of 2,935,000. In mid-April, LOS40 also makes a strategic branding change, moving away from the slogan "Music Inspires Life," which had been in place since the 2016 rebranding. The station opts to revert to its earlier slogan, "Todos Los Éxitos".
- 2019: Yu No Te Pierdas Nada, a popular program on LOS40 hosted by Dani Mateo, concludes its run after six years. Dani Mateo and the show transition to Europa FM, marking a significant change in the radio landscape. This move initiates a new chapter for both the host and the program as they aim to engage audiences on a different network, while LOS40 faces the challenge of filling the void left by one of its prominent shows.
- 2020: On 30 August, Luis López, a longstanding figure at LOS40, announces his retirement from the World Dance Music radio program after 18 years of leading and hosting. His tenure at LOS40 spanned 28 years. López confirms that his successor starting September 2020 would be José Luis Garaña de los Cobos, widely known as DJ Nano, from Madrid.

== Game 40 ==
From 1992 to 1998, Los 40 hosted Game 40, a weekly video game show in Spain. Airing on Sunday evenings, the show was initially hosted by Juan Luis Ferrer before Guillem Caballé took over, infusing the program with a dynamic and entertaining style. Caballé, along with co-hosts Manuel Martín Vivaldi, Ángel Ortiz, and Carlos Ulloa, presented segments that included game reviews, news, and comedy, all interspersed with music from video game and anime soundtracks. Despite competition from sports programs, it garnered significant listenership.

== Controversy ==
In December 2014, DJ Paul Hip asked listeners of 40 Principales Chile what they would do for free music concert festival tickets. The radio station hosted a competition for contestants to come up with their own challenges. If their challenge was accepted by the radio DJ, they were given the opportunity to complete it to win the tickets.

A female listener offered to do "anything including licking whipped cream out of a human anus" to win tickets to the Mysteryland EDM festival. Hip took the woman up on the proposal - in the middle of his show. On 17 December 2014, she completed the act live on air. Hip then proceeded to invite listeners of the radio station to kiss the woman who had just licked whipped cream from his anus to win tickets of their own.

The radio station's production team tweeted an uncensored image of the act, which went viral over Twitter and caused controversy, with Twitter followers calling the act "misogynist and humiliating" and questioning the station's ethics and journalistic integrity. The radio station later issued an apology saying they were sorry if they had offended their audience and they probably should not have accepted such challenge, but assured it was completely "voluntary and even suggested by the participant" in a contest that was open to what ever each contestant wanted to do. The radio station deleted the tweet promptly after the negative reactions and assured their fans the contest's only purpose was to have fun, and not to hurt or demean anyone.

== Former presence ==
LOS40 has previously operated in Nicaragua and Paraguay, where it was replaced by La Buenísima and an evangelical radio station, respectively.

== Awards and recognition ==
Los 40 has received multiple accolades throughout its history. In 1985, it was awarded the Ondas Award in the National Radio category. Prior to this, in 1982, Pepe Cañaveras also received an Ondas Award. In 1998, Joaquín Luqui was honored with the Ondas Award for Best Music Program Presenter, and the program "Del 40 al 1" won the Ondas Award for Best Specialized Television Program.

In 2000, the program "En tu casa o en la mía" won the Ondas Award for the most innovative and original radio program and for its service to society. In 2003, Juanma Ortega received the Golden Antenna as the presenter of the morning show "Anda ya!", which also received the Ondas Award for radio innovation in 2004. In 2010, Frank Blanco was awarded the Golden Antenna by the Federation of Spanish Radio and Television Associations. In 2013, "Yu: No te pierdas nada" won the Ondas Award for radio innovation.

In September 2015, Los 40 launched the "40 Global Show," a new program broadcast in 11 countries, featuring global music news presented by Tony Aguilar. This program also established a direct connection between the different Los 40 stations in Spain and Latin America.

== Events ==
- Los 40 Music Awards
- Los 40 Primavera Pop
- Los 40 Summer Live

== Stations ==
Location	Callsign	Frequency	Property
Bogotá, Colombia	HJL81	100.4 MHz	Caracol Radio
Buenos Aires, Argentina	LS4	105.5 MHz	Radio Continental
Guatemala City, Guatemala	TGCV	93.3 MHz	PRISA
Madrid, Spain	LOS40	93.9 MHz	PRISA
Mexico City, Mexico	XEX-FM	101.7 MHz	PRISA
Panama City, Panama		91.3 MHz	PRISA
Quito, Ecuador		97.7 MHz	PRISA
San José, Costa Rica		104.3 MHz	La Nación
Santiago, Chile		101.7 MHz	Ibero Americana
Santo Domingo, Dominican Republic		88.5 MHz	PRISA

== See also ==
- 40 TV
- PRISA
