= La Oreja de Van Gogh discography =

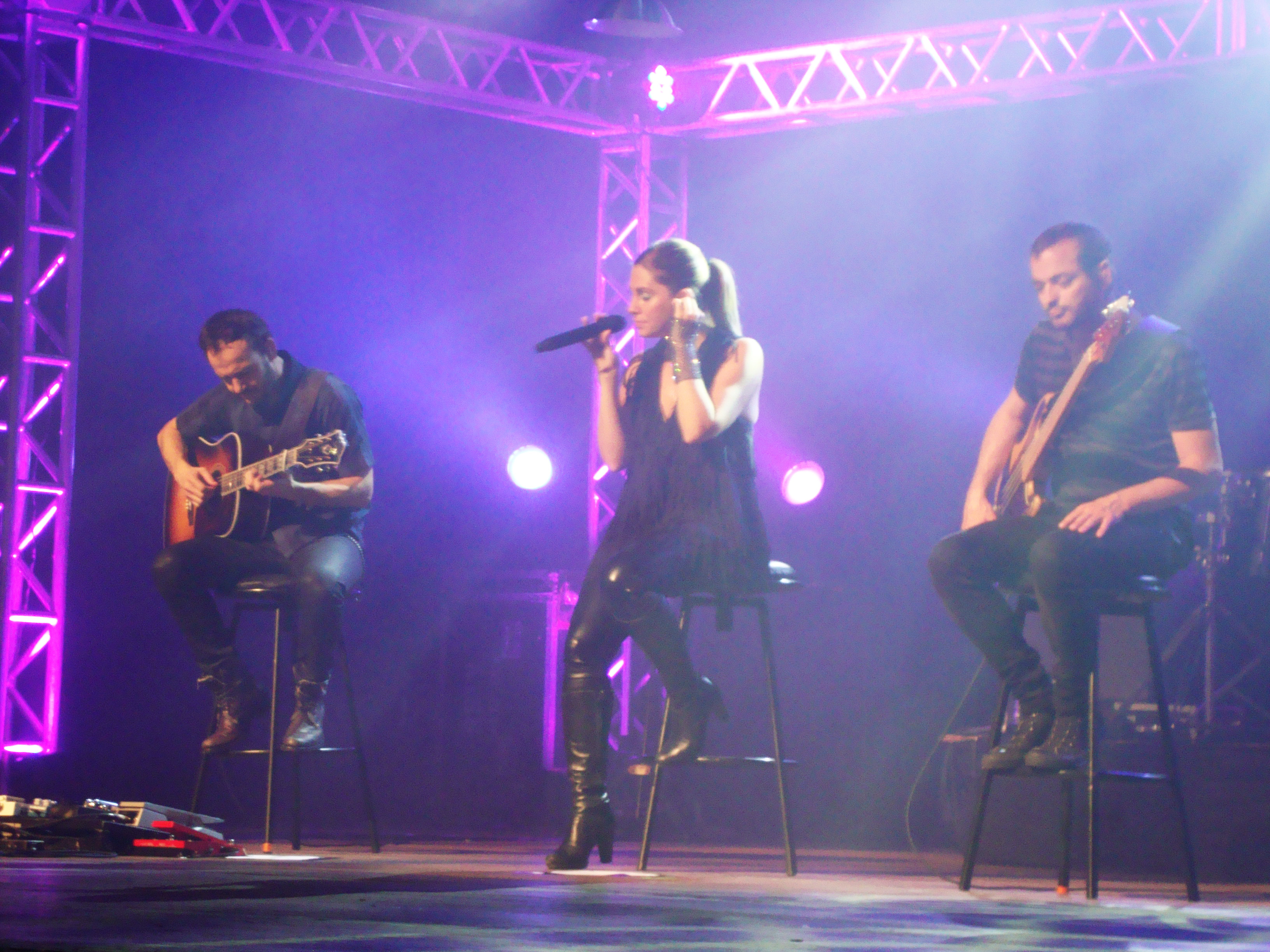
- Studio albums: 8
- Extended plays: 1
- Live albums: 3
- Compilation albums: 2
- Singles: 36
- Music videos: 59
- Box sets: 1

The discography of Spanish pop rock band La Oreja de Van Gogh consists of eight studio albums, three live albums, two compilation albums, one extended play, one box set, thirty-six singles and fifty-nine music videos. The band have sold over 8 million records worldwide, making them the best selling pop band in Spain and the country's most influential pop group since Mecano. La Oreja de Van Gogh released their debut studio album Dile Al Sol on May 18, 1998. It was a commercial success in Spain, eventually peaking at number 1 and being certified 7 times Platinum in the country. The band's second studio album, El viaje de Copperpot, was released on September 11, 2000. It is the band's most successful album in Spain; selling more than 1,200,000 copies there, becoming Sony's Spain second highest selling album in history. It also catapulted the band's fame and success in Latin America. The first three singles reached number 1 in Spain, Mexico and most Latin American countries.

La Oreja de Van Gogh's third album was released on April 28, 2003. Internationally, it is the most successful album of the band and it is said to be their consolidation album in the music industry. Like their previous work, its first three singles; "Puedes contar conmigo", "20 de Enero" and "Rosas" peaked #1 in Spain and most latinamerican charts. After three years, the band released a box set celebrating their first ten years of music (LOVG 1996-2006) alongside their fourth album, Guapa and the extended play Más guapa, the last to feature Amaia Montero. The first single "Muñeca de Trapo" manage to reach #1 position on the Spanish and Mexican charts and while the rest of the singles reached high positions in Spain, they had modest impact in latinamerica. After the separation of former vocalist Amaia Montero, they released their first compilation album LOVG: Grandes éxitos.

Their fifth studio album A las cinco en el Astoria featured a new vocalist: Leire Martínez. Four singles were released from the album. The first, "El Último Vals", had average success in Spain and latinamerica. The next year the band recorded a symphonic version of their greatest hits with the new vocalist, and released it under the name Nuestra casa a la izquierda del tiempo. On September 13, 2011 the band released Cometas por el cielo. The two first singles, "La Niña que Llora en tus Fiestas" and "Cometas por el Cielo", reached the top 20 in Spain and Latin America. Two live albums would be released in the five-year gap that followed before the next studio album: Cometas Por el Cielo: En Directo Desde America (2011) and Primera Fila (2013). Then in 2016 the band would release El planeta imaginario, which again topped the Spanish charts and reached number 2 in Mexico. Singles such as "Verano", "Diciembre", and "Estoy Contigo" were released to promote it. In 2020, the band released their eight studio album and Spanish chart-topper Un susurro en la tormenta, marking a milestone for vocalist Leire Martinez, who by then had reached the same number of studio albums released with the group as Amaia Montero, and had surpassed her in years as active part of the band. Martínez later left the band in October 2024, after serving as the band's vocalist for over sixteen years.

== Albums ==
=== Studio albums ===
List of studio albums, with selected chart positions, sales figures and certifications
Title	Album details	Peak chart positions			Certifications	Sales
Title	Album details	SPA	MEX	US Latin	Certifications	Sales
Dile Al Sol	Released: May 18, 1998; Label: Epic; Format: CD, cassette	1	—	—	PROMUSICAE: 7× Platinum	SPA: 800,000; USA: 40,000
El viaje de Copperpot	Released: September 11, 2000; Label: Sony Music; Format: CD, cassette	1	—	—	PROMUSICAE: 11× Platinum; AMPROFON: 2× Platinum; RIAA: Platinum (Latin)	WW: 2,500,000; SPA: 1,200,000; MEX: 400,000; USA: 100,000
Lo Que te Conté Mientras te Hacías la Dormida	Released: April 28, 2003; Label: Sony Music; Format: CD, cassette	1	—	9	PROMUSICAE: 6× Platinum; AMPROFON: Platinum+Gold; RIAA: 2× Platinum (Latin)	WW: 2,000,000; SPA: 700,000; CHI: 88,000; USA: 260,000
Guapa/Más guapa	Released: April 25, 2006; Label: Sony Music; Format: CD, digital	1	—	5	PROMUSICAE: 15× Platinum; AMPROFON: Platinum	WW: 1,000,000; SPA: 600,000; USA: 75,000
A las cinco en el Astoria	Released: September 2, 2008; Label: Sony Music; Format: CD, digital	1	20	21	PROMUSICAE: 4× Platinum; AMPROFON: Gold	SPA: 150,000
Nuestra casa a la izquierda del tiempo	Released: 20 October 2009; Label: Sony Music; Format: CD, digital	3			PROMUSICAE: Gold	SPA: 150,000|-
Cometas por el cielo	Released: September 13, 2011; Label: Sony Music; Format: CD, digital	1	21	64	PROMUSICAE: Platinum	
El planeta imaginario	Released: November 4, 2016; Label: Sony Music; Format: CD, digital	1	—	9	PROMUSICAE: Gold	
Un susurro en la tormenta	Released: September 18, 2020; Label: Sony Music; Format: CD, digital, vinyl	1	—	—		

=== Live albums ===
List of live albums, with selected chart positions, sales figures and certifications
Title	Album details	Peak chart positions		Certifications
Title	Album details	SPA	MEX	Certifications
La Oreja de Van Gogh - Gira 2003	Released: April 19, 2004; Label: Epic; Format: CD	12	—	SPA: Gold
Cometas por el cielo en directo desde América	Released: September 18, 2012; Label: Epic; Format: CD/DVD, digital	—	—	
Primera Fila	Released: 2013; Label: Epic; Format: CD/DVD, digital	6	—	MEX: Gold

=== Box sets ===
List of box sets
Title	Album details
LOVG 1996-2006	Released: April 4, 2006; Label: Epic; Format: 5 CD + 1 DVD

=== Remix albums ===
List of remix albums
Title	Album details
Cometas por el Cielo (Remixes)	Released: June 5, 2012; Label: Epic; Format: Digital

== Extended plays ==
List of extended plays
Title	Details
París (French edition)	Released: May 10, 2004; Label: Epic; Format: CD

== Singles ==
=== As lead artist ===
Title	Year	Peak chart positions			Album
Title	Year	SPA	MEX	Latin Pop Airplay	Album
"El 28"	1998	—	—	31	Dile al Sol
"Soñaré"	1998	—	33	22	Dile al Sol
"Cuéntame al Oído"	1998	—	—	22	Dile al Sol
"Pesadilla"	1999	—	—	—	Dile al Sol
"Dile al Sol"	1999	—	—	—	Dile al Sol
"Qué puedo pedir"	1999	—	—	—	Dile al Sol
"El Libro"	1999	—	—	—	Dile al Sol
"La estrella y la Luna"	1999	—	—	—	Dile al Sol
"Cuídate"	2000	8	1	27	El Viaje de Copperpot
"París"	2000	—	1	—	El Viaje de Copperpot
"La Playa"	2001	9	1	18	El Viaje de Copperpot
"Pop"	2001	—	—	—	El Viaje de Copperpot
"Soledad"	2001	—	—	—	El Viaje de Copperpot
"Mariposa"	2001	—	—	—	El Viaje de Copperpot
"Tu Pelo"	2001	—	—	—	El Viaje de Copperpot
"La chica del gorro azul"	2002	—	—	—	El Viaje de Copperpot
"Puedes Contar Conmigo"	2003	3	1	3	Lo que te conté mientras te hacías la dormida
"20 de Enero"	2003	14	2	—	Lo que te conté mientras te hacías la dormida
"Rosas"	2003	5	1	4	Lo que te conté mientras te hacías la dormida
"Deseos de cosas imposibles"	2004	19	9	10	Lo que te conté mientras te hacías la dormida
"Vestido azul"	2004	17	—	—	Lo que te conté mientras te hacías la dormida
"Geografía"	2004	15	5	—	Lo que te conté mientras te hacías la dormida
"Historia de un Sueño"	2004	—	—	—	Lo que te conté mientras te hacías la dormida
"Bonustrack"	2005	9	—	—	Lo que te conté mientras te hacías la dormida
"Muñeca de Trapo"	2006	—	1	3	Guapa
"Dulce Locura"	2006	—	16	22	Guapa
"Perdida"	2006	—	36	—	Guapa
"En mi lado del sofá"	2006	—	11	—	Guapa
"El Último Vals"	2008	43	8	17	A las cinco en el Astoria
"Inmortal"	2008	10	—	14	A las cinco en el Astoria
"Jueves"	2008	14	15	34	A las cinco en el Astoria
"Europa VII"	2009	43	—	—	A las cinco en el Astoria
"Cuéntame al oído"	2009	—	—	—	Nuestra casa a la izquierda del tiempo
"Puedes contar conmigo"	2010	—	—	—	Nuestra casa a la izquierda del tiempo
"La niña que llora en tus fiestas"	2011	8	1	1	Cometas por el Cielo
"Cometas por el Cielo"	2011	20	1	1	Cometas por el Cielo
"La luz que nace en ti"	2011	43	—	—	non-album
"Día cero"	2012	—	—	—	Cometas por el Cielo
"Otra vez me has sacado a bailar"	2012	22	—	—	non-album
"El primer día del resto de mi vida"	2013	6	—	—	"Primera Fila"
"Maria" (featuring Natalia Lafourcade)	2013	26	—	—	"Primera Fila"
"Verano"	2016	65	—	—	El planeta imaginario
"Diciembre"	2017	—	—	—	El planeta imaginario
"La chica del espejo"	2018	11	—	—	non-album
"Todos estamos bailando la misma canción"	2025	51	—	—	non-album

=== As featured artist ===
Title	Year	Peak chart positions			Certifications	Album
Title	Year	SPA	MEX	Latin Pop Airplay	Certifications	Album
"Ay Haiti" (Various Artists featuring La Oreja de Van Gogh)	2010	1	—	—	SPA: Platinum	Charity single

== Videography ==
=== Video albums ===
Year	Title	Production details	Notes
1999	Dile al Sol	Released: 1999; Label: Epic; Format: VHS	Contains the "Dile al Sol Tour" shot live from Spain.
2002	La Oreja de Van Gogh (Video)	Released: 2002; Label: Epic; Format: DVD, VHS	First homonym DVD of the band. Contains 12 music videos, 3 live performances and special features from the group at that point.
2003	La Oreja de Van Gogh en Directo Gira 2003	Released: 2003; Label: Epic; Format: DVD	Contains the "Tour Lo que te conté mientras te hacías la dormida" shot live from several Spanish cities such as San Sebastián, Burgos, Valencia, Sevilla and Málaga. Was certified gold in Spain and México, and Platinum in Argentina.
2010	Un viaje al Mar Muerto	Released: 2010; Label: Epic; Format: DVD	Their first full-length feature film, which was filmed in Israel in collaboration with other artists. Included as a bonus disc in the special edition of Nuestra casa a la izquierda del tiempo.
2012	Cometas por el cielo en directo desde Argentina	Released: 2012; Label: Epic; Format: DVD	Contains the "Tour Cometas por el cielo" shot live from Buenos Aires, Argentina.

=== Music videos ===
Year	Title	Album
1998	"El 28"	Dile al Sol
1998	"Soñaré"	Dile al Sol
1998	"Cuéntame al Oído"	Dile al Sol
1999	"Pesadilla"	Dile al Sol
1999	"Dile al Sol"	Dile al Sol
1999	"El Libro"	Dile al Sol
2000	"Cuídate"	El Viaje de Copperpot
2000	"París"	El Viaje de Copperpot
2000	"La Playa"	El Viaje de Copperpot
2000	"Mariposa" (2 versions)	El Viaje de Copperpot
2001	"Soledad"	El Viaje de Copperpot
2001	"Pop"	El Viaje de Copperpot
2003	"Puedes Contar Conmigo"	Lo Que Te Conté Mientras Te Hacías la Dormida
2003	"20 de Enero"	Lo Que Te Conté Mientras Te Hacías la Dormida
2003	"Rosas" (2 versions)	Lo Que Te Conté Mientras Te Hacías la Dormida
2004	"Geografía"	Lo Que Te Conté Mientras Te Hacías la Dormida
2006	"Muñeca de Trapo"	Guapa
2006	"Dulce Locura"	Guapa
2006	"Perdida"	Guapa
2006	"Escapar"	Guapa
2006	"En Mi Lado del Sofá"	Más Guapa
2008	"El Último Vals"	A las Cinco en el Astoria
2008	"Inmortal"	A las Cinco en el Astoria
2008	"Jueves" (4 versions)	A las Cinco en el Astoria
2009	"Europa VII"	A las Cinco en el Astoria
2009	"Noche de Paz" (First version)	non-album
2010	"Historia de Amor"	non-album
2011	"La Niña Que Llora en Tus Fiestas" (2 versions)	Cometas por el Cielo
2011	"Cometas por el Cielo"	Cometas por el Cielo
2011	"Las Noches Que No Mueren"	Cometas por el Cielo
2011	"Promesas de Primavera"	Cometas por el Cielo
2011	"La Luz Que Nace en Ti"	non-album
2011	"Noche de Paz" (Second version)	non-album
2012	"Día Cero"	Cometas por el Cielo
2013	"Otra Vez Me Has Sacado a Bailar"	non-album
2013	"Madre Anoche en las Trincheras" (Lyric video)	non-album
2016	"Verano"	El Planeta Imaginario
2016	"Diciembre"	El Planeta Imaginario
2016	"Campana sobre Campana"	non-album
2017	"Cuando Menos Lo Merezca"	El Planeta Imaginario
2017	"Estoy Contigo"	El Planeta Imaginario
2018	"Esa Chica"	El Planeta Imaginario
2018	"La Chica del Espejo" (Lyric video)	non-album
2019	"Confía en el Viento"/"Let the Wind Guide You"/"Haizeaz Fidatu"	non-album
2020	"Abrázame" (Original, animated and acoustic versions)	Un Susurro en la Tormenta
2020	"Durante una Mirada"	Un Susurro en la Tormenta
2020	"Sirenas"	Un Susurro en la Tormenta
2020	"A Este Lado del Cristal"	non-album
2021	"Blanca Navidad"	non-album
2025	"Todos Estamos Bailando la Misma Canción"	non-album

== See also ==
- List of best-selling albums in Spain
