= List of number-one albums of 2008 (Spain) =

Top 100 España is a record chart published weekly by PROMUSICAE (Productores de Música de España), a non-profit organization composed by Spain and multinational record companies. This association tracks record sales (physical and digital) in Spain.

== Albums ==
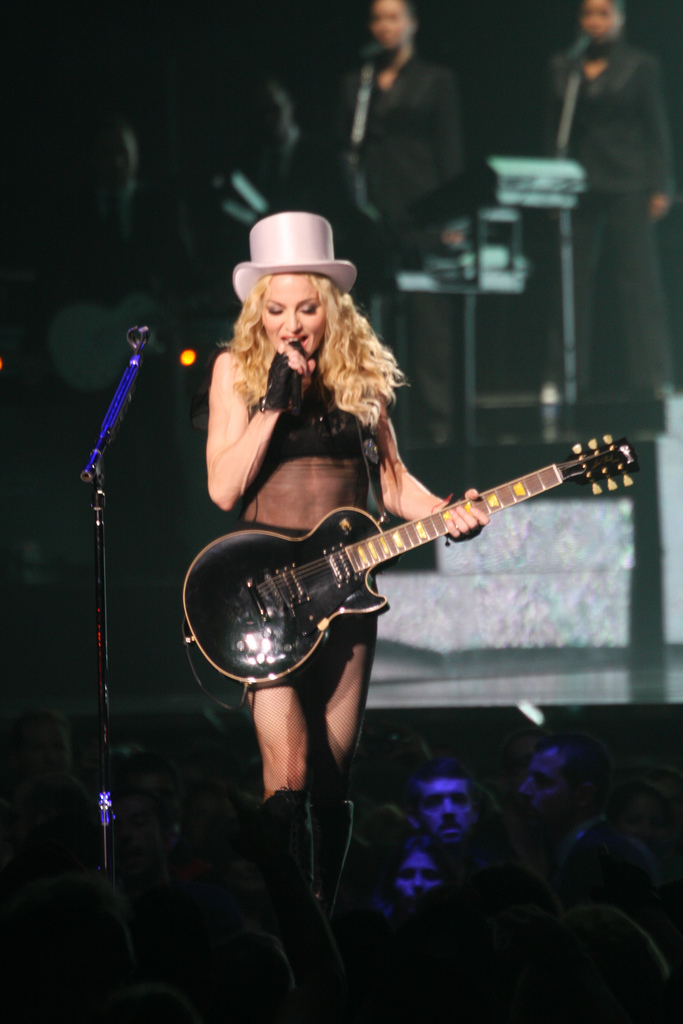
American singer Madonna peaked at number one with her eleventh studio album Hard Candy.

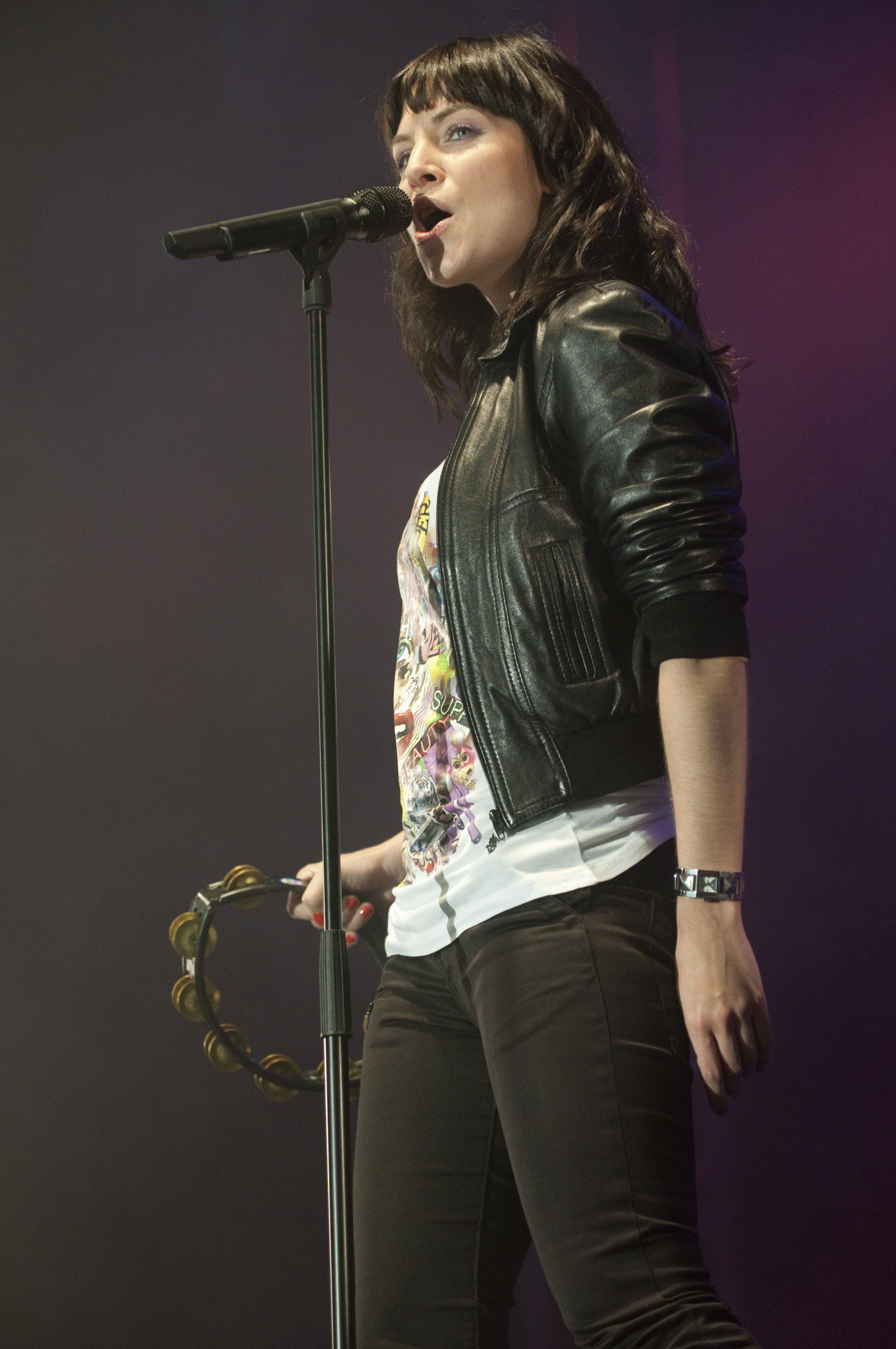
Spanish group La Oreja de Van Gogh managed to continue their run of number ones with A las Cinco en el Astoria, their first album since the incorporation of new lead singer Leire Martínez.

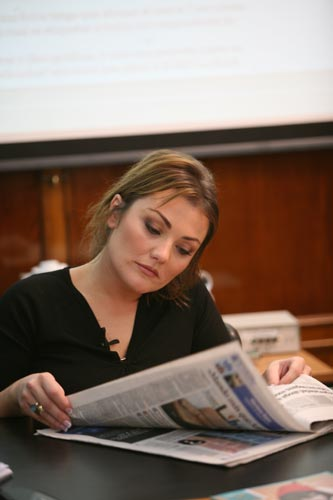
Spanish singer Amaia Montero stayed at number one for five non-consecutive weeks in 2008 and 2009 with her self-titled debut album Amaia Montero.

Chart date	Album	Artist	Reference
January 6	Dos Pájaros de un Tiro	Serrat & Sabina	
January 13	Papito	Miguel Bosé	
January 20	Papito	Miguel Bosé	
January 27	Papito	Miguel Bosé	
February 3	Papito	Miguel Bosé	
February 10	A Buena Hora	Sergio Dalma	
February 17	A Buena Hora	Sergio Dalma	
February 24	Back to Black	Amy Winehouse	
March 2	Allenrok	Estopa	
March 9	Allenrok	Estopa	
March 16	Allenrok	Estopa	
March 23	Allenrok	Estopa	
March 30	Allenrok	Estopa	
April 6	Personas	El Canto del Loco	
April 13	Personas	El Canto del Loco	
April 20	Personas	El Canto del Loco	
April 27	Tarántula	Mónica Naranjo	
May 4	Hard Candy	Madonna	
May 11	Cómplices	Luis Miguel	
May 18	Saldremos a la Lluvia	Manolo García	
May 25	Saldremos a la Lluvia	Manolo García	
June 1	Gato Negro Dragón Rojo	Amaral	
June 8	Gato Negro Dragón Rojo	Amaral	
June 15	Gato Negro Dragón Rojo	Amaral	
June 22	Viva la Vida or Death and All His Friends	Coldplay	
June 29	Gato Negro Dragón Rojo	Amaral	
July 6	Gato Negro Dragón Rojo	Amaral	
July 13	Operación Triunfo 2008 - Agua	Operación Triunfo 2008	
July 20	Operación Triunfo 2008 - Agua	Operación Triunfo 2008	
July 27	Operación Triunfo 2008 - Agua	Operación Triunfo 2008	
August 3	Operación Triunfo 2008 - Agua	Operación Triunfo 2008	
August 10	Operación Triunfo 2008 - Agua	Operación Triunfo 2008	
August 17	Operación Triunfo 2008 - Agua	Operación Triunfo 2008	
August 24	Mamma Mia! The Movie	Soundtrack	
August 31	Tarántula	Mónica Naranjo	
September 7	A las Cinco en el Astoria	La Oreja de Van Gogh	
September 14	La Ley Innata	Extremoduro	
September 21	Curiosa la Cara de tu Padre	Melendi	
September 28	Curiosa la Cara de tu Padre	Melendi	
October 5	Con los Pies en la Tierra	Andy & Lucas	
October 12	Hellville de Luxe	Bunbury	
October 19	Hellville de Luxe	Bunbury	
October 26	Black Ice	AC/DC	
November 2	Black Ice	AC/DC	
November 9	High School Musical 3: Senior Year	Soundtrack	
November 16	The Promise	Il Divo	
November 23	Amaia Montero	Amaia Montero	
November 30	Amaia Montero	Amaia Montero	
December 7	50 Años Después	Raphael	
December 14	50 Años Después	Raphael	
December 21	50 Años Después	Raphael	
December 28	50 Años Después	Raphael	

== See also ==
- List of number-one singles of 2008 (Spain)
