= Los Premios 40 Principales 2009 =

Spanish music awards ceremony

- Date: December 11, 2009
- Venue: Palacio de Deportes de la Comunidad de Madrid
- Host: Sira Fernández, Frank Blanco and Tony Aguilar
- Network: Cuatro (Spain); A&E Network (Latin America)

== Awards ==
=== Best Song ===
- Amaia Montero — "Quiero Ser"
- Macaco — "Moving"
- Carlos Baute (featuring Marta Sánchez)— "Colgando En Tus Manos"
- Melendi — "Piratas del Bar Caribe"
- Efecto Mariposa — "Por Quererte"

=== Best Video ===
- Nena Daconte — "El Aleph"
- Zenttric — "Solo Quiero Bailar"
- Second — "Rincón Exquisito"
- Macaco — "Moving"
- Fito & Fitipaldis — "Antes de Que Cuente Diez"

=== Best Album ===
- Amaia Montero — Amaia Montero
- Pignoise — Cuestión de Directo
- La Quinta Estación — Sin Frenos
- Pereza — Aviones
- Macaco — Puerto Presente

=== Best Solo ===
- Macaco
- Amaia Montero
- Carlos Baute
- Antonio Orozco
- Fito & Fitipaldis

=== Best Group ===
- Nena Daconte
- El Sueño de Morfeo
- Pereza
- Efecto Mariposa
- La Quinta Estación

=== Best New Act ===
- Zenttric
- Second
- Ilsa
- Calle Paris
- Ragdog

=== Best Tour ===
- The Killers — Tour 09
- Melendi — Curiosa la Cara de Tu Padre Tour
- U2 — U2 360° Tour
- Enrique Bunbury — Helville de Tour
- Valladolid Latino

=== Best Argentine Act ===
- Teen Angels
- Axel
- Fidel Nadal
- Babasónicos
- Miranda!

=== Best Chilean Act ===
- Kata Palacios
- Sinergia
- Movimiento Original
- Zk y Crac MC
- Chancho en Piedra

=== Best Colombian Act ===
- Jerau
- Andrés Cepeda
- Santiago Cruz
- Mauricio & Palodeagua
- Fanny Lú

=== Best Costa Rican Act ===
- El Parque
- Akasha
- Esteban Calderón
- Mechas
- Gandhi

=== Best Ecuadorian Act ===
- Fausto Miño
- Xauxa Kings
- Israel Brito
- Daniel Betancour
- Mirella Cesa

=== Best Guatemalan Act ===
- Duo Sway
- Fabiola
- Bohemia Suburbana
- Viento en Contra
- El Clubo

=== Best Mexican Act ===
- Jot Dog
- Paulina Rubio
- Zoé
- Gloria Trevi
- Ximena Sariñana

=== Best Panamanian Act ===
- Mario Spinalli
- Alejandro Lagrotta
- Ivan Barrios
- Post
- Cienfue

=== Best Latin Song ===
- Nelly Furtado — "Manos Al Aire"
- Tiziano Ferro (featuring Amaia Montero) — "El Regalo Más Grande"
- Shakira — "Loba"
- Luis Fonsi — "No Me Doy Por Vencido"
- Paulina Rubio — "Causa y Efecto"

=== Best Latin Act ===
- Ha*Ash
- Paulina Rubio
- Luis Fonsi
- Shakira
- Nelly Furtado

=== Best International Song ===
- Jason Mraz — "I'm Yours"
- James Morrison — "Broken Strings"
- Lady Gaga — "Poker Face"
- Alesha Dixon — "The Boy Does Nothing"
- The Black Eyed Peas — "I Gotta Feeling"

=== Best International Act ===
- The Killers
- The Black Eyed Peas
- Beyoncé
- Jason Mraz
- Amy McDonald

== Live performances ==
- 40's The Musical
- Robbie Williams — "Bodies / You Know Me / Feel"
- Carlos Baute and Marta Sánchez — "Colgando En Tus Manos"
- Amaia Montero — "Te Voy A Decir Una Cosa / 4" / Quiero Ser"
- Macaco — "Moving / Tengo"
- Alesha Dixon — "Breathe Slow / The Boy Does Nothing"
- Estopa — "Como Camarón"
- Teen Angels — "Quién"
- Paulina Rubio — "Causa y Efecto / Ni Rosas Ni Juguetes"
- James Morrison (featuring Nelly Furtado) — "Get to You / Broken Strings"
- Nelly Furtado — "Más / Manos Al Aire"
- David Bisbal — "Esclavo de Sus Besos"
- Pixie Lott — "Mama Do (Uh Oh, Uh Oh)"
- Mika — "Rain / Grace Kelly"
- Shakira — "Loba / Lo Hecho Está Hecho"
