= Oreja =

Oreja is the Spanish word for ear. It may also refer to:

== People ==
- Facundo Oreja, and Aregentine footballer
- Jaime Mayor Oreja, a Spanish politician
- Marcelino Oreja, 1st Marquess of Oreja, a Spanish lawyer, diplomat and politician
- Marcelino Oreja Elósegui, a Spanish entrepreneur
- Ricardo Oreja Elósegui, a Spanish politician

== Other ==
- Colmenar de Oreja, a town and municipality in Spain
  - CD Colmenar de Oreja, the town's football club
- La Oreja de Van Gogh, a Spanish pop band
  - La Oreja de Van Gogh discography
