= Premio Lo Nuestro 2005 =

Latin Music awards show

17th Lo Nuestro Awards
- Date: Thursday, February 24, 2005
- Site: American Airlines Arena, Miami, Florida, US
- Hosted by: Eugenio Derbez

Premio Lo Nuestro 2005 nominees were announced during a press conference on December 2, 2004, at the American Airlines Arena in Miami, Florida. The hottest names in Latin music make up the list of nominees for the longest running and most popular Latin music award program in the U.S.

== Host ==
Eugenio Derbez

== Performers ==
- Paulina Rubio
- Alejandro Sanz
- David Bisbal
- Chayanne
- Don Omar
- Los Horóscopos de Durango
- Daddy Yankee — "Gasolina"
- Julieta Venegas
- Los Tigres del Norte

== Special awards ==
=== Lifetime Achievement Award ===
- Los Temerarios

=== Legendary Young Artist Award ===
- Paulina Rubio

== Pop ==
=== Album of the Year ===
1. Abrazar la Vida - Luis Fonsi
2. De Viaje - Sin Bandera
3. Pau-Latina - Paulina Rubio
4. Seducción - Jennifer Peña
5. Stop - Franco de Vita

=== Male Artist ===
1. Chayanne
2. Luis Fonsi
3. Obie Bermúdez
4. Ricky Martin

=== Female Artist ===
1. Ednita Nazario
2. Jennifer Peña
3. Paulina Rubio
4. Thalía

=== Group or Duo ===
1. Aleks Syntek & Ana Torroja
2. Andy & Lucas
3. La Oreja de Van Gogh
4. Sin Bandera

=== Song of the Year ===
1. "Cuidarte el alma" - Chayanne
2. "Que lloro" - Sin Bandera
3. "Rosas", La Oreja de Van Gogh
4. "Te quise tanto" - Paulina Rubio
5. "Y todo queda en nada" - Ricky Martin

=== Best New Soloist or Group of the Year ===
1. Andy & Lucas
2. Ha*Ash
3. Kalimba Marichal
4. Negros

== Rock ==
=== Album of the Year ===
1. Atlas - Kinky
2. Esenciales: Luna - Maná
3. Rocanlover - Zoé
4. Sí - Julieta Venegas
5. Trippin Tropicana - Superlitio

=== Artist of the Year ===
1. Juanes
2. Julieta Venegas
3. Kinky
4. Maná

== Tropical ==
=== Album of the Year ===
1. Indetenibles - Toros Band
2. Love & Hate - Aventura
3. Mi tentación - Rey Ruiz
4. Travesía - Víctor Manuelle
5. Valió la Pena - Marc Anthony

=== Male Artist of the Year ===
1. Jerry Rivera
2. Marc Anthony
3. Rey Ruiz
4. Víctor Manuelle

=== Female Artist of the Year ===
1. Celia Cruz
2. Gloria Estefan
3. La India
4. Melina León

=== Group or Duo of the Year ===
1. Aventura
2. Grupo Manía
3. Son de Cali
4. Toros Band

=== Song of the Year ===
1. "Ahora quién" - Marc Anthony
2. "Creo en el amor" - Rey Ruiz
3. "Lloré lloré" - Víctor Manuelle
4. "Loca conmigo" - Toros Band
5. "Tengo ganas" - Víctor Manuelle

=== Merengue Artist of the Year ===
1. Elvis Crespo
2. Grupo Manía
3. Limi-T 21
4. Toros Band

=== Tropical Salsa Artist of the Year ===
1. Jerry Rivera
2. Marc Anthony
3. Rey Ruiz
4. Víctor Manuelle

=== Tropical Traditional Artist of the Year ===
1. Aventura
2. Andy Andy
3. Carlos Vives
4. Elvis Martinez

=== Best New Soloist or Group of the Year ===
1. Domenic Marte
2. El Florido Flores
3. Luna Llena
4. N'Klabe

== Regional Mexican music ==
=== Album of the Year ===
1. Simplemente - Intocable
2. Locos de amor - Los Horóscopos de Durango
3. Pacto De Sangre - Los Tigres del Norte
4. Por ti - Banda el Recodo
5. Que amarren a Cupido - Joan Sebastian

=== Male Artist of the Year ===
1. Adán Chalino
2. Joan Sebastian
3. Marco Antonio Solís
4. Pepe Aguilar

=== Female Artist of the Year ===
1. Alicia Villarreal
2. Mariana Seoane
3. Ninel Conde
4. Paquita la del Barrio

=== Group or Duo of the Year ===
1. Banda el Recodo
2. Conjunto Primavera
3. Montez de Durango
4. Los Tigres del Norte

=== Song of the Year ===
1. "Dos locos" - Los Horóscopos de Durango
2. "Hazme olvidarla" - Conjunto Primavera
3. "Lágrimas de cristal" - Montez de Durango
4. "Más Que Tu Amigo" - Marco Antonio Solís
5. "Te quise olvidar" - Montez de Durango

=== Banda of the Year ===
1. Banda el Recodo
2. Cuisillos
3. Los Horóscopos de Durango
4. Montez de Durango

=== Grupera Artist of the Year ===
1. Alicia Villarreal
2. Bronco El Gigante de América
3. Joan Sebastian
4. Los Temerarios

=== Norteño Artist of the Year ===
1. Conjunto Primavera
2. Intocable
3. Palomo
4. Los Tigres del Norte

=== Ranchera Artist of the Year ===
1. Marco Antonio Solís
2. Paquita la del Barrio
3. Pepe Aguilar
4. Vicente Fernández

=== Best New Artist or Group of the Year ===
1. Grupo Climax
2. Juan Tavares
3. Kris Melody
4. Mariana Seoane

== Urban ==
=== Album of the Year ===
1. Barrio Fino - Daddy Yankee
2. DJ Kane - DJ Kane
3. La Verdad - Fulanito
4. The Last Don Live - Don Omar
5. Uno, Dos: Bandera - Control Machete

=== Artist of the Year ===
1. Control Machete
2. Don Omar
3. Fulanito
4. Yolanda Pérez

== Video of the Year ==
1. "Try to Save Your S’ong" - Alejandro Sanz
2. "Bulería" - David Bisbal
3. Santa María - Gotan Project
4. "Lágrimas" - JD Natasha
5. "Ahora quién" - Marc Anthony
6. "Te quise tanto" - Paulina Rubio
