= 2 (Amaia Montero album) =

Studio album by Amaia Montero
- Released: November 8, 2011
- Recorded: 2011
- Genre: Pop rock
- Length: 45 minutes
- Label: Sony Music
- Producer: Amaia Montero; Paco Salazar; Sebastian Krys

Amaia Montero chronology
Amaia Montero (2008)	2 (2011)	'Si Dios quiere yo tambien'

Singles from 2
- 1. "Caminando" Released: September 17, 2011; 2. "Tu Mirada" Released: November 29, 2011; 3. "¿Dónde Estabas?" Released: April 12, 2012

2 is the second solo album by Spanish singer Amaia Montero, after an eleven-year music career as the frontwoman for La Oreja de Van Gogh and the success of her first album Amaia Montero. It was released in Spain on 8 November 2011 by Sony BMG.

Upon its release, the album debuted at No. 1 on the iTunes best-selling albums chart and held the top position for a week. It also entered the Spanish albums chart at No. 3. Since its release in 2011, the album has sold over 40,000 copies.

The song "Caminando" was released as the first single from 2. It was premiered on September 17, 2011, on the Spanish radio station Los 40 Principales and was released on September 20, 2011, on iTunes.

== Track listing ==
All tracks are written by Amaia Montero.

No.	Title	Length
1.	"Cuestión de Suerte"	3:32
2.	"Caminando"	3:11
3.	"¿Dónde Estabas?"	3:26
4.	"Tu Mirada"	4:21
5.	"Sabes"	3:38
6.	"Noviembre"	3:39
7.	"Hasta Siempre Compañero"	3:35
8.	"Perdóname"	4:00
9.	"Una Sola Vez"	4:00
10.	"Entre Tù y Yo"	3:11
11.	"A Tu Lado"	4:13
12.	"Tu Mirada"	4:21

== Singles ==
1. "Caminando" - (2011)
2. "Tu Mirada" - (2011)
3. "¿Dónde Estabas?" - (2012)
