= El Último Vals =

Single

Single by La Oreja De Van Gogh

from the album A las cinco en el Astoria
- Released: 15 July 2008
- Recorded: 2008
- Genre: Pop rock
- Length: 3:21
- Label: Sony BMG
- Songwriter(s): Xabi San Martín

La Oreja De Van Gogh singles chronology
"En mi lado del sofá" (2006)	"El Último Vals" (2008)	"Inmortal" (2008)

"El último vals" (The Last Waltz) is the first single from the album A las cinco en el Astoria by the Spanish pop/rock group La Oreja de Van Gogh. It is also the first single released after the departure of the former lead singer of the group Amaia Montero and with the new singer Leire Martínez. The song's lyrics are based on Martin Scorsese's 1978 concert film The Last Waltz.

== Music video ==
The music video for the song was filmed in Spain and was premiered in July 2008.

== Chart performance ==
Chart (2008–2009)	Peak position
Chile (EFE)	7
Costa Rica (EFE)	8
Guatemala (EFE)	7
Mexico (Monitor Latino)	1
Spain (PROMUSICAE)	43
US Hot Latin Songs (Billboard)	38
US Latin Pop Airplay (Billboard)	17

== Certifications and sales ==
Region	Certification	Certified units/sales
Spain (PROMUSICAE) Ringtone	Platinum	20,000^{*}
^{*} Sales figures based on certification alone.

== See also ==
- List of number-one songs of 2008 (Mexico)
