= 4 Segundos =

"4 Segundos""

Single by Amaia Montero

from the album Amaia Montero
- Released: April 2009
- Recorded: 2008
- Genre: Pop rock
- Length: 3:49
- Label: Sony BMG
- Songwriter(s): Amaia Montero

Amaia Montero singles chronology
"El Regalo Más Grande" (2009)	"4 Segundos"" (2009)

"4 Segundos" is a song written and produced by Amaia Montero for her 2008 debut solo album Amaia Montero. It was released as the album's second internationally released single in 2009.

== Charts and certifications ==
=== Charts ===
"4 Segundos" peaked at #9 in Spain.

=== Certifications ===
Region	Certification	Certified units/sales
Spain (PROMUSICAE)	Gold	20,000^{*}
^{*} Sales figures based on certification alone.
