= Dulce Locura =

Single by La Oreja De Van Gogh

from the album Guapa
- Released: 10 July 2006
- Genre: Pop rock
- Length: 3:51
- Label: Sony BMG
- Songwriters: Amaia Montero & Xabi San Martín

La Oreja De Van Gogh singles chronology
"Muñeca de Trapo" (2006)	"Dulce Locura" (2006)	"Perdida" (2006)

"Dulce Locura" ("Sweet Insanity"), working title: Tu Luna ("Your Moon"), is the second single from the album Guapa by the Spanish pop/rock group La Oreja de Van Gogh. For the Italian version of Guapa, it was adapted to Italian language by Eros Ramazzotti, and comes as a bonus track in the Italian Special Edition, under the name of "Dolce Follia". Some time after, a new edition of this song was released in Simlish for the Spanish edition of The Sims 2: Pets.

== About the song ==
The lyrics of the song talk about the end of a relationship. The woman has been left by her lover and though she understands why her lover left, she is now serving her sentence and tells her lover not to ask her to want to live.

In the song there is a piano in the background. There are also some electronic sounds and a guitar. The verses contains the phrase that stands out due to repetition: "I sell." This makes reference to getting rid of objects that make the narrator have ties with her partner or remember him, as in "I sell a worned camera that used to capture the gaze that in life I shall record." The songs has a quick beat until it arrives at a bridge point where it slows down, picking up the beat again in the chorus. According to songwriters Xabi and Amaia, is a combination between the choruses by Xabi and the verses by Amaia.

The aforementioned musical bridge, was created because the producer Nigel Walker asked for it, and was written by Amaia in a kitchen recipe book, since she had no other place where she could write it at the time. Though the company proposed that this be the first single of the album, it was not so; however, it got to be number one of Los 40 Principales on 14 October 2006.

== Video ==
The video for this song was produced by "Struendo" again and was recorded in Toledo in an ancient palace from the 12th century. In the video the members of the band play in a dark living room and in the chorus of the song, feathers fly around in slow motion. At the same time, there are also objects falling in slow motion throughout the whole video; there are plates, fish tanks, and even some of the band members falling.

== Charts ==
Chart (2006)	Peak position
US Latin Pop Airplay (Billboard)	22
