= Rosas (La Oreja de Van Gogh song) =

Single by La Oreja de Van Gogh

from the album Lo Que te Conté Mientras te Hacías la Dormida
- Released: 26 September 2003
- Genre: Pop
- Length: 3:56
- Label: Sony BMG
- Songwriter: Xabi San Martín
- Producer: Nigel Walker

La Oreja de Van Gogh singles chronology
"20 de enero" (2003)	"Rosas" (2003)	"Deseos de cosas imposibles" (2004)

Music video
- "Rosas" on YouTube

"Rosas" (English: "Roses") is a song performed by the Spanish pop group La Oreja de Van Gogh. It was written by Xabi San Martín and released by Sony BMG as the third single from the band's album Lo Que te Conté Mientras te Hacías la Dormida (2003). The song tells the story of the protagonist who sees her first love with another woman and remembers the moments they lived together for six months. At the same time, she narrates how she waits for him to arrive with roses every Friday in a place they frequented so they can continue with their relationship. The song peaked at number five on the Spanish Singles Chart. After its release, the song became one of the group's most popular songs.

== Composition ==
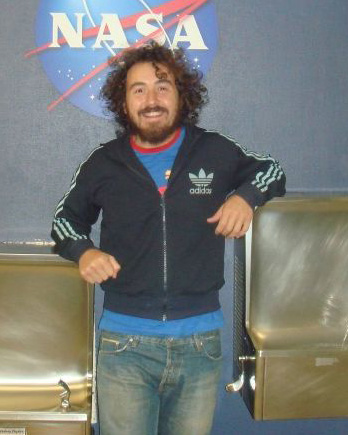
Xabi San Martín composed "Rosas".

"Rosas" is a torch pop song. It was written by Xabi San Martín, the keyboardist of La Oreja de Van Gogh. The lyrics narrate how the singer sees her first love with another woman as she remembers the moments they lived during their six-month relationship. At the same time, she narrates how every Friday she expects him to bring her roses while she waits in a place they frequented. When asked about the verse "Y es que empiezo a pensar que el amor verdadero es tan sólo el primero / y es que empiezo a sospechar que los demás son sólo para olvidar" ("And it is that I begin to think that true love is only the first one / And it is that I begin to suspect that the others are only for forgetting"), band members said that in perspective life looks different at age 20 than it does at age 45, although first love has an air of freshness to it that others do not have.

== Reception ==
Jenny Gage highlighted the song in an album review. An editor of the Spanish radio station Happy FM described it as a "generational hymn" in which the listener easily identifies for its lyrical content and melodic tempo. At the same time, the writer perceived the refrain was ABBA-influenced. Andrea Mireille described Amaia Montero's vocals as "sweet and idyllic". At the 17th Annual Lo Nuestro Awards, "Rosas" was nominated Pop Song of the Year, but lost to "Que Lloro" by Sin Bandera. It was recognized as an award-winning song at the 2005 ASCAP Latin Awards in the rock category.

The song was covered by the regional Mexican group Porte Diferente.

== Charts ==
Chart (2003–2004)	Peak position
Colombia (Notimex)	4
Spain (PROMUSICAE)	5
US Hot Latin Songs (Billboard)	4
US Latin Pop Airplay (Billboard)	4
Venezuela (Notimex)	3

Chart (2024)	Peak position
Argentina (Argentina Hot 100)	68
Colombia (Billboard)	22
Ecuador (Billboard)	17
Peru (Billboard)	23
Spain (PROMUSICAE)	46

== Certifications ==
Region	Certification	Certified units/sales
Mexico (AMPROFON)	Gold	30,000^{*}
Spain (Promusicae)	5× Platinum	300,000^{‡}
^{*} Sales figures based on certification alone.^{‡} Sales+streaming figures based on certification alone.
