= Nuestra casa a la izquierda del tiempo =

Nuestra Casa A La Izquierda Del Tiempo

Compilation album by La Oreja de Van Gogh
- Released: 20 October 2009
- Recorded: Studios Iz (Guipuzkoa, Spain); Red Led Studio (Madrid, Spain); Studio 2 of Slovak National Radio (Bratislava, Slovakia)
- Genre: Pop, Pop rock, Acoustic
- Length: 47:27
- Language: Spanish; Euskera
- Label: Sony Music
- Producer: Nigel Walker; La Oreja de Van Gogh

La Oreja de Van Gogh chronology
A las cinco en el Astoria (2008)	Nuestra Casa A La Izquierda Del Tiempo (2009)	Cometas por el cielo (2011)

Singles from A las cinco en el Astoria
- 1. "Cuéntame al oído (2009)" Released: 14 September 2009; 2. "Puedes contar conmigo (2009)" Released: 17 February 2010

Nuestra Casa A La Izquierda Del Tiempo (Our Home On The Left Side Of Time) is a compilation album by La Oreja de Van Gogh. It was released on 20 October 2009, only one year after the release of the band's previous recording, A las cinco en el Astoria. It contains new versions of some of the band's biggest hits from its previous five albums, including tracks originally sung by former band-member Amaia Montero. All songs were re-recorded by the group to include Leire Martínez, who had recently been introduced as the band's new singer. The Bratislava Symphony Orchestra provided further musical accompaniment, giving a more acoustic and orchestral feel to the original songs.

The album also included the song "Loa Loa" ("Sleep, Sleep"), a traditional lullaby in Basque performed a cappella. It is the only track in the album that had never been released before by La Oreja de Van Gogh. Despite this and the fact that all tracks were recorded for the album in a studio, Nuestra casa a la izquierda del tiempo is not considered a studio album. Instead, the band usually refers to it as a "compilation album in which the whole group could experiment and play with the songs", mostly producing "acoustic versions" of the songs that they were "more confident with".

== Tracks ==
#	Title	Length
01.	"París" (Paris) • Music and Lyrics: Amaia Montero, Xabi San Martín, Pablo Benegas, Haritz Garde and Álvaro Fuentes	4:32
02.	"Cuéntame Al Oído" (Tell Me In My Ear) • Music and Lyrics: Amaia Montero, Xabi San Martín, Pablo Benegas, Haritz Garde and Álvaro Fuentes	4:14
03.	"El Último Vals" (The Last Waltz) • Music: Xabi San Martín • Lyric: Pablo Benegas	3:33
04.	"La Playa" (The Beach) • Music and Lyrics: Amaia Montero, Xabi San Martín, Pablo Benegas, Haritz Garde and Álvaro Fuentes	4:17
05.	"Rosas" (Roses) • Music and Lyrics: Amaia Montero, Xabi San Martín, Pablo Benegas, Haritz Garde and Álvaro Fuentes	4:22
06.	"20 De Enero" (20 January) • Music and Lyrics: Amaia Montero, Xabi San Martín, Pablo Benegas, Haritz Garde and Álvaro Fuentes	4:08
07.	"Jueves" (Thursday) • Music and lyric: Xabi San Martín	4:24
08.	"Loa Loa" (Sleep, Sleep) • Traditional song	1:09
09.	"Muñeca De trapo" (Rag doll) • Music: Amaia Montero and Xabi San Martín • Lyric: Pablo Benegas	4:03
10.	"Soledad" (Loneliness) • Music and Lyrics: Amaia Montero, Xabi San Martín, Pablo Benegas, Haritz Garde and Álvaro Fuentes	4:04
11.	"Deseos De Cosas Imposibles" (Wishes For Impossible Things) • Music and Lyrics: Amaia Montero, Xabi San Martín, Pablo Benegas, Haritz Garde and Álvaro Fuentes	4:07
12.	"Puedes Contar Conmigo" (You Can Count On Me) • Music and Lyrics: Amaia Montero, Xabi San Martín, Pablo Benegas, Haritz Garde and Álvaro Fuentes	4:27

== Charts ==
Chart (2009)	Peak position
Spanish Albums (Promusicae)	3

== Personnel ==
- Pablo Benegas - guitars
- Xabier San Martin - keyboards, theremin, backing vocals
- Álvaro Fuentes - bass, trumpet
- Haritz Garde - drums
- Leire Martinez - vocals
- Nigel Walker - guitars, tambourine, shaker
- Miguel Ángel Collado - arrangements
- David Hernando - host
- Pedro Delgado - graphic design
- Rubén Martín - photography
