= Puedes Contar Conmigo =

"Puedes contar conmigo"

Single by La Oreja de Van Gogh

from the album Lo que te conté mientras te hacías la dormida
- Released: March 2003
- Recorded: 2002
- Genre: Pop rock, new wave
- Length: 3:56
- Label: Sony BMG
- Songwriter: Amaia Montero
- Producer: Nigel Walker

La Oreja de Van Gogh singles chronology
"Tu Pelo" (2000)	"Puedes contar conmigo" (2003)	"20 de Enero" (2003)

"Puedes contar conmigo" (Spanish pronunciation: [ˈpweðes konˈtaɾ komˈmiɣo]; "You can count on me") is a song written by Amaia Montero and performed by La Oreja de Van Gogh. It was released in April, 2003, as the first single from their third studio album Lo que te conté mientras te hacías la dormida. While the singer remembers las tardes de invierno por Madrid ("winter afternoons in Madrid"), the lyrics tells the story of a person who ends a relationship and does not want her ex-partner to think that he can no longer count on her. She wants him to know for all the good times during the relationship that "he can always count on her", although she also hints that she still hopes for him to return.

The song is considered one of the band's signature songs.

The single reached the No.1 spot for several weeks on the Spain, Mexico, Chile, Uruguay and Argentina Top 40 charts.

The song achieved a number 5 position on the US Latin Tracks chart and a number 3 on the US Latin Pop Airplay chart.

== Charts ==
Chart (2003)	Peak position
Spain (Promusicae)	3
US Hot Latin Songs (Billboard)	5
US Latin Pop Airplay (Billboard)	3
Venezuela (Notimex)	4
