= Quiero Ser (song) =

Single by Amaia Montero

from the album Amaia Montero
- Released: October 4, 2008
- Recorded: 2008
- Genre: Pop
- Length: 4:18
- Label: Sony BMG
- Songwriter: Amaia Montero
- Producer: Claudio Guidetti

Amaia Montero singles chronology
"Quiero Ser" (2008)	"Ni Puedo Ni Quiero" (2009)

"Quiero Ser" (I want to be) is the debut solo single by Spanish singer-songwriter Amaia Montero. It was released on October 4, 2008 as the lead single from her eponymous debut album, Amaia Montero, also serving as the album's opening track. It became her first release after departing the group La Oreja de Van Gogh.

The single was premiered on Spanish radio station "Los 40 Principales". In January 2009, it became the longest charting number one single in the Spanish airplay history with 13 consecutive weeks in the number one spot.

== Charts ==
Chart (2009)	Peak position
Panama (EFE)	9
Spain (Promusicae)	2
US Hot Latin Songs (Billboard)	30

== Certifications ==
Region	Certification	Certified units/sales
Spain (Promusicae)	2× Platinum	50,000^{*}
Spain (Promusicae) Ringtone	Platinum	20,000^{*}
^{*} Sales figures based on certification alone.
