= Cometas por el cielo =

Cometas Por El Cielo

Studio album by La Oreja de Van Gogh
- Released: 13 September 2011 (Spain)
- Recorded: Music Lan Studios (Girona, Spain); Decibel Studios (Stockholm, Sweden)
- Genre: Pop; Power pop Electropop; Pop rock
- Length: 41:51 (Standard edition); 45:03 (Special Edition); 45:11 (Itunes edition); 45:17 (Spotify edition)
- Language: Spanish
- Label: Sony Music
- Producer: Simon Nordberg; La Oreja de Van Gogh

La Oreja de Van Gogh chronology
Nuestra casa a la izquierda del tiempo (2009)	Cometas Por El Cielo (2011)	El planeta imaginario (2016)

Singles from Cometas por el cielo
- 1. "La niña que llora en tus fiestas" Released: 16 July 2011; 2. "Cometas por el cielo" Released: 29 October 2011; 3. "Día cero" Released: 21 July 2012

Cometas Por El Cielo is the sixth studio album by La Oreja de Van Gogh. It was released on 13 September 2011 under Sony Music. It is the second album by the band not produced by Nigel Walker. Simon Nordberg handled the production. The album departs from previous efforts as an electropop and power pop record.

It was released in two physical editions, standard and special, and two online editions, on iTunes and Spotify. All the editions differ on the bonus track. The standard edition does not contain a bonus track (unlike almost every album by the band, which include a hidden track), the rest of them has each one a different song as a bonus track.

The album art was drawn by Serge Birault aka PapaNinja.

== Track listing ==
Standard edition
No.	Title	Lyrics	Music	Length
1.	"La Niña Que Llora En Tus Fiestas"	Pablo Benegas	Xabi San Martín	2:41
2.	"Día Cero"	Benegas	San Martín	3:46
3.	"Paloma Blanca"	San Martín	San Martín	4:10
4.	"Cometas Por El Cielo"	Benegas	San Martín	3:40
5.	"Las Noches Que No Mueren"	Benegas	San Martín	3:36
6.	"El Tiempo A Solas"	Benegas	San Martín	3:36
7.	"Promesas De Primavera"	San Martín	San Martín	3:04
8.	"Un Minuto Más"	Benegas	San Martín	4:24
9.	"Mi Calle Es Nueva York"	Benegas	San Martín	2:47
10.	"Mientras Quede Por Decir Una Palabra"	San Martín	San Martín	3:16
11.	"Esta Vez No Digas Nada"	San Martín	San Martín	3:39

Special Edition
No.	Title	Length
12.	"Dos Copos De Nieve"	3:12

iTunes Edition
No.	Title	Length
12.	"Epifanía"	3:20

Spotify Edition
No.	Title	Length
12.	"Me Falta El Aire"	3:26

== Year End Charts ==
The album peaked #1 in Spain, being certified Platinum (60.000 copies sold).

Year-End Chart (2011)	Peak position
Spain (PROMUSICAE)	20
Year-End Chart (2012)	Peak position
Spain (PROMUSICAE)	37

== Certifications ==
Region	Certification	Certified units/sales
Mexico (AMPROFON)	Gold	30,000^{^}
Spain (Promusicae)	Platinum	60,000^{^}
^{^} Shipments figures based on certification alone.

== Personnel ==
- Leire Martinez - vocals
- Xabier San Martín - keyboards, backing vocals
- Pablo Benegas - guitars
- Álvaro Fuentes - bass
- Haritz Garde - drums
- Simon Nordberg - producer
