= Amaia Montero (album) =

2008 studio album by Amaia Montero

Studio album by Amaia Montero
- Released: November 18, 2008
- Recorded: 2008
- Genre: Pop rock
- Length: 42:30
- Label: Sony Music
- Producer: Claudio Guidetti

Amaia Montero chronology
| Amaia Montero (2008) | 2 (2011) |

Singles from Amaia Montero
- 1. "Quiero Ser" Released: 4 October 2008; 2. "Ni Puedo Ni Quiero" Released: 10 December 2008; 3. "4"" Released: 11 April 2009; 4. "Te Voy a Decir una Cosa" Released: 15 September 2009; 5. "Mirando al Mar" Released: 8 March 2010

"Amaia Montero" is the debut solo album by Spanish singer Amaia Montero, after an eleven-year music career as the frontwoman for La Oreja de Van Gogh. It was released in Spain on 18 November 2008 by Sony BMG. "Quiero Ser" (English: I want to be) was the first single released from the album. According to "Promusicae" Amaia Montero was the Ninth biggest selling album of 2008 in Spain, for surpassing sales of 81,000 in less than 2 months (six weeks). The album was nominated for Best Female Pop Vocal Album at the 2009 Latin Grammy Awards.

== Production ==
Having no plans of working with professional writers, Montero wrote and recorded her first solo album in the Italian cities of Genoa and Milan, and mixed the songs at Henson Recording Studios in Los Angeles CA.

"I will never forget this first album. It has been a learning, both professional and personal. As a mature coup. It has been like starting from below zero, with the feelings of a flower skin, with the possibility of feeling myself." - Amaia said during an interview.

"I left the band for an artistic necessity, to express what I am, I will always have in my entire love and affection, after what we have lived together as a family. It is a tribute to all those wonderful years" - Amaia recounted.

Among the songs there is one dedicated to her father, her mother and another also devoted one of the songs to her former colleagues in La Oreja de Van Gogh, for the 11 years they worked together. Their last work together was Guapa, the best-selling album of 2006 in Spain and much of Latin America, with 11-platinum and three gold around the world.

Professional ratings
Review scores
| Source | Rating |
|---|---|
| Allmusic | 4/5 stars |

== Track listing ==
| No. | Title | Writer(s) | Length |
|---|---|---|---|
| 1. | "Quiero Ser" | Amaia Montero | 4:18 |
| 2. | "Mirando al Mar" | Amaia Montero | 4:37 |
| 3. | "4"" | Amaia Montero | 3:49 |
| 4. | "407" | Amaia Montero | 3:31 |
| 5. | "Tulipán" | Amaia Montero | 3:31 |
| 6. | "Ni Puedo Ni Quiero" | Amaia Montero | 3:24 |
| 7. | "Te Falta Rock" | Amaia Montero | 4:06 |
| 8. | "Círculos" | Amaia Montero | 3:44 |
| 9. | "La Bahia del Silencio" | Amaia Montero | 4:25 |
| 10. | "Te Voy a Decir una Cosa" | Amaia Montero | 3:33 |
| 11. | "Por Toda una Vida" | Amaia Montero | 3:48 |

== Singles ==
1. "Quiero Ser" - (2008)
2. "Ni Puedo Ni Quiero" - (2008) (released only in Chile)
3. "4"" - (2009)
4. "Te Voy a Decir una Cosa" - (2009)
5. "Mirando al Mar" - (2010)

== Charts and certifications ==
=== Charts ===
| Country | Peak |
|---|---|
| Spain | 1 |
| USA (Latin) | 7 |
| Mexico | 15 |
| Chile | 7 |
| Venezuela | 1 |
| Uruguay | 2 |

=== Certifications ===
| Region | Certification | Certified units/sales |
|---|---|---|
| Spain (PROMUSICAE) | 3× Platinum | 240,000^{^} |
^{^} Shipments figures based on certification alone.

== Release history ==
| Region | Date |
|---|---|
| United States | November 18, 2008 |
| Spain | November 18, 2008 |
| Chile | November 26, 2008 |
| Puerto Rico | February 10, 2009 |
