= Dile al sol =

Studio album by La Oreja de Van Gogh
- Released: 18 May 1998
- Recorded: ASK Producciones; Madrid, Spain; Middle Ear Studios; New York, United States; 1997 – 1998
- Genres: Rock, Pop rock
- Length: 44:57
- Language: Spanish
- Label: Sony Music Entertainment
- Producer: Alejo Stivel

La Oreja de Van Gogh chronology
Dile al sol (1998)	El viaje de Copperpot (2000)

Singles from Dile al sol
- 1. "El 28" Released: 8 May 1998; 2. "Soñaré" Released: 7 August 1998; 3. "Cuéntame al oído" Released: 10 December 1998; 4. "Pesadilla" Released: 26 March 1999; 5. "Dile al Sol" Released: June 1999; 6. "Qué puedo pedir" Released: 13 August 1999; 7. "El Libro" Released: 1999; 8. "La Estrella y la Luna" Released: 2000

Dile al sol is the debut album from Spanish pop rock band La Oreja de Van Gogh released by Sony Music Entertainment in May 1998. The album was very successful in Spain, selling more than 800,000 copies there.

This first album was recorded in Madrid between the months of July and August 1997. The title track from this album was the one with which people began to know them, but it was not until the release of "Cuéntame al oído" that the band became a success.

== Track listing ==
Dile al sol track listing
No.	Title	Lyrics	Music	Length
1.	"El 28" (with Txetxo Bengoetxea)	La Oreja de Van Gogh	La Oreja de Van Gogh	2:48
2.	"Cuéntame al oído"	Xabi San Martín, Pablo Benegas	La Oreja de Van Gogh	3:10
3.	"Pesadilla" (with Mikel Erentxun)	Benegas	La Oreja de Van Gogh	4:18
4.	"La estrella y la luna" (with Txetxo Bengoetxea)	Benegas	La Oreja de Van Gogh	3:46
5.	"Viejo cuento"	Benegas	La Oreja de Van Gogh	5:05
6.	"Dos cristales"	San Martín, Amaia Montero	La Oreja de Van Gogh	4:24
7.	"Lloran piedras" (with Txetxo Bengoetxea)	La Oreja de Van Gogh	La Oreja de Van Gogh	4:04
8.	"¿Qué puedo pedir?" (with Mikel Erentxun)	La Oreja de Van Gogh, Rafael Berrio García	La Oreja de Van Gogh, Berrio García	3:01
9.	"Dile al sol"	Benegas	La Oreja de Van Gogh	3:36
10.	"El libro" (with Txetxo Bengoetxea)	Benegas	La Oreja de Van Gogh	3:45
11.	"La carta"	Benegas	La Oreja de Van Gogh	2:40
12.	"Soñaré"	Montero	La Oreja de Van Gogh	3:34

== Personnel ==
=== Performing ===
- La Oreja de Van Gogh
  - Amaia Montero – vocals, backing vocals
  - Pablo Benegas – guitar
  - Xabi San Martín – keyboards, programming
  - Álvaro Fuentes – bass
  - Haritz Garde – percussion
- Mikel Erentxun – backing vocals
- Txetxo Bengoetxea – backing vocals
- Pablo Martín – backing vocals
- Josu García – backing vocals, guitar
- Marcelo Fuentes – bass
- Fernando Samalea – percussion
- Francis Amat – piano

=== Technical ===
- Alejo Stivel – record production
- Barry Sage – sound recording, audio mixing, audio mastering
- Josu García – record production
- Marta García – sound recording
- Alberto Vidal – sound recording
- Gugu Martínez – audio engineering

=== Design ===
- Carlos Martín – graphic design
- Jesús Ugalde – photography
- Luis Oliveira – hair & makeup
- Oddyty San Sebastián, Guipúzcoa, Spain – wardrobe

== Charts ==
Chart (1999)	Peak position
Spain (AFYVE)	1

== Sales and certifications ==
Region	Certification	Certified units/sales
Spain (Promusicae)	7× Platinum	800,000
United States	—	19,000

== See also ==
- List of best-selling albums in Spain
