= Guapa =

Studio album by La Oreja de Van Gogh
- Released: April 25, 2006
- Recorded: Abbey Road Studios; London, England; PKO Studios; Madrid, Spain; Sterling Sound; New York City, New York, U.S. December 2005 – January 2006
- Genres: Rock, pop rock, Latin pop.
- Length: 48:43
- Language: Spanish
- Label: Sony BMG
- Producers: Nigel Walker; La Oreja de Van Gogh

La Oreja de Van Gogh chronology
Lo que te conté mientras te hacías la dormida (2003)	Guapa (2006)	A las cinco en el Astoria (2008)

Más guapa
- Re-edition album cover

Professional ratings
Review scores
Source	Rating
Allmusic	4/5 stars

Guapa (Spanish for Beautiful or Cute) is the fourth studio album released on April 25, 2006, by Spanish Pop rock band La Oreja de Van Gogh. On December 5, 2006, Más Guapa was released exclusively in Spain and Mexico. Two months later, on February 13, 2007, the album was also released in Chile. Más Guapa includes a second disc of previously unreleased material from the Guapa sessions, as well as from recording sessions of previous albums. The album won a Latin Grammy Award for Best Pop Album By a Duo or Group. Guapa is the band's last album with Amaia Montero as lead singer.

== Recording ==
The album's composition began in February 2005. By November of that year, there were already 18 tracks that would probably be in the final album. It was recorded in London, England in Abbey Road Studios from December 2–23, 2005. In January 2006, they began re-recording in Madrid and reporters from TV channel Cuatro were present throughout to later publish a report regarding the album. In spite of the group's desire that a report not be made, a DVD was included in certain versions of Guapa.

The album was produced with Nigel Walker. Its publication coincides with the 10th anniversary of the group's existence. Guapa contains thirteen songs that mix the band's typical pop with reggae, ranchera, a bit of bossa nova, some sounds from the 60's and 70's, a few techno arrangements and recollections of American music. In this CD the artistic maturity of the group becomes apparent in their lyrics as well as their melodies with songs like Noche (Night), Muñeca de trapo, (Rag Doll), and Perdida (Lost).

== Release ==
Guapa was the most anticipated album of 2006 in Spain. Originally, the release was set for March 28, 2006; however, technical problems with a machine in Du Manoir made the premiere be on April 25, 2006. When "Muñeca de Trapo" was released as the lead single in Spanish radio station Los 40, it was quite a success.

Two days before its official release, telephone company Movistar offered a Sony Ericson phone with the full album and the "Muñeca de Trapo" video preloaded in the device, causing the album to leak before its official release.

By December 2006, the album already had already been certified seven times seven Platinum. Guapa won the Latin Grammy of 2006 as best pop album by a group or duo.

As soon as the album was out in the market, the band began its promotion in North and South America, appearing in almost every Spanish-speaking country. This tour through the Americas made the album sell about a million copies there, making themselves enter countries they had not entered before.

This great success in America, along with the sales in Spain which went beyond 560,000 made Guapa the third most sold album in the history of the band, with about 1,500,000 copies sold.

By the end of the tour, the band had over 6,000,000 copies sold in total all around the world. The album remained for over 30 weeks in the Top 10 CD's sold in Spain, 10 of which, although not consecutive, made it No. 1.

A new edition of Guapa was released, under the title Más Guapa, which included a bonus CD featuring unreleased recordings from the album sessions. "En mi lado del sofá" was released as its single. In 2007, "Dulce Locura" and "Muñeca de Trapo" were recorded in Italian, and released in a new edition exclusive for that country, but all promotion was halted due to Amaia Montero's unexpected departure.

== Album title ==
For past albums, La Oreja de Van Gogh have presented esoteric and lengthy titles such as El viaje de Copperpot and Lo que te conté mientras te hacías la dormida. When asked what inspired the minimalism of Guapa during an online chat session hosted by elmundo.es, the band revealed that the title is an abbreviation of their to-date longest album title:

Guapa es la historia de quien no se da por vencido en el maravilloso viaje de encontrarse a uno mismo, de quien acepta cumplir años y seguir teniendo miedos, de quien llena la almohada de inseguridades pero al levantarse siempre hace la cama, de quien sonríe de verdad y como antes: sin darse cuenta, de quien consigue que lo que quiere y lo que le apetece hagan las paces, de quien hace del tiempo un aliado sigiloso que, cada mañana y frente al espejo del alma, le hará sentirse cada vez un poco más guapa.

Translation:

Guapa is the story of one who doesn't give up in the wonderful journey of finding oneself, , who fills the pillow with insecurities, but upon awakening always makes the bed, who smiles truthfully and like before: without realizing so, who is able to reach a compromise between what she loves and what she wants, of who makes of time a quiet ally who, every morning before the mirror of the soul, will make herself feel every time a bit prettier.

The title is a spiritual affirmation printed on the album's back cover.

== Track listings ==
Guapa – Standard edition
No.	Title	Writer(s)	Length
1.	"Noche"	Amaia Montero, Xabi San Martín, Pablo Benegas	4:29
2.	"Muñeca de Trapo"	Montero, San Martín, Benegas	3:55
3.	"Dulce Locura"	Montero, San Martín	3:49
4.	"Perdida"	Montero, San Martín, Benegas	4:02
5.	"Vuelve"	Montero, San Martín, Benegas	3:36
6.	"Escapar"	San Martín	3:33
7.	"Irreversible"	San Martín	3:28
8.	"A Diez Centímetros de Tí"	Montero, San Martín	3:50
9.	"V.O.S. (Versión Original Subtitulada)"	San Martín	2:20
10.	"Apareces Tú"	Montero	4:33
11.	"Manhattan"	Montero, San Martín, Benegas	2:59
12.	"Mi Vida sin Ti / Cuántos Cuentos Cuento"	Montero, San Martín, Benegas	7:42

Guapa – Italian edition
No.	Title	Writer(s)	Length
13.	"Bambola Di Pezza (Muñeca De trapo)"	Eros Ramazzotti, Montero, San Martín, Benegas	3:55
14.	"Dolce Follia (Dulce Locura)"	Ramazzotti, Montero, San Martín	3:41

Guapa – US iTunes edition bonus track
No.	Title	Writer(s)	Length
15.	"Coronel"	San Martín	3:59

- "Coronel" was mistakenly titled as "Flash"

Más Guapa – Disc 2
No.	Title	Lyrics	Music	Length
1.	"En Mi lado Del sofá"	Benegas	Montero, San Martín	3:30
2.	"V.O.S." (Demo)	San Martín	San Martín	3:18
3.	"Nuestro mundo"	Benegas	Montero, San Martín	3:30
4.	"Cuántos Cuentos Cuento" (Demo)	San Martín	San Martín	3:27
5.	"Amores Dormidos"	Benegas	Montero, San Martín	3:47
6.	"Canción Desesperada"	Benegas	Montero, San Martín	3:34
7.	"Coronel"	San Martín	San Martín	3:59
8.	"La Paz de tus Ojos" (Demo)	Benegas	Montero, San Martín	4:02
9.	"Nube"	Benegas	Montero, San Martín	3:43
10.	"Despacio"	Benegas	Montero, San Martín	3:59
11.	"Déjate Llevar"	La Oreja de Van Gogh	La Oreja de Van Gogh	3:31
12.	"Aquella Ingrata"	La Oreja de Van Gogh	La Oreja de Van Gogh	3:05
13.	"El Árbol"	La Oreja de Van Gogh	La Oreja de Van Gogh	3:39
14.	"Escalera a la Luna"	La Oreja de Van Gogh	La Oreja de Van Gogh	5:43

== Personnel ==
=== Performing ===
- La Oreja de Van Gogh
  - Amaia Montero – vocals, backing vocals
  - Xabi San Martín – keyboards, piano, backing vocals
  - Pablo Benegas – guitar
  - Álvaro Fuentes – bass
  - Haritz Garde – percussion

=== Technical ===
- La Oreja de Van Gogh – record production, audio mixing
- Nigel Walker – record production, audio mixing
- Leon Zervos – audio mastering
- Bori Alarcón – technical production
- Rudolf Hernández – technical production
- Carlos Hernández – technical production
- B. Oberhagemann – record production
- Bernard Cocoignac – technical production
- Marie Claire – technical production
- Margarita Pérez – technical production
- Paco Pérez – technical production

=== Design ===
- Rafa Sañudo – graphic design
- Montse Velando – photography
- Ray – illustrations

== Charts ==
=== Album ===
Chart (2006)	Peak position
Spain Top 100 Albums	1
U.S. Billboard 200	114
U.S. Billboard Top Latin Albums	5
Canada Billboard 200	200
Mexico	1

== Sales and certifications ==
Region	Certification	Certified units/sales
Argentina (CAPIF)	Platinum	40,000^{^}
Chile	—	100,000
Mexico (AMPROFON)	Platinum	100,000^{^}
Spain (Promusicae)	15× Platinum	1,200,000^{‡}
^{^} Shipments figures based on certification alone.^{‡} Sales+streaming figures based on certification alone.

List of albums containing a hidden track
