= Un susurro en la tormenta =

2020 studio album by La Oreja de Van Gogh

Un Susurro en la Tormenta

Studio album by La Oreja de Van Gogh
- Released: 18 September 2020 (Spain)
- Recorded: Le Manoir de Lion, France
- Genre: Pop, Pop rock
- Length: 38:30
- Language: Spanish
- Label: Sony Music
- Producer: Paco Salazar

La Oreja de Van Gogh chronology
El Planeta Imaginario (2016)	Un Susurro en la Tormenta (2020)	Esencial (2021)

Singles from Un Susurro en la Tormenta
- 1. "Abrázame" Released: 11 April 2020; 2. "Te Pareces Tanto a Mí" Released: 4 July 2020 (promo); 3. "Durante una Mirada" Released: 8 September 2020; 4. "Sirenas" Released: 27 March 2021

Un Susurro en la Tormenta is the eighth studio album by La Oreja de Van Gogh which was released on 18 September 2020 under Sony Music. The album, a follow-up to El Planeta Imaginario released four years prior, was produced by Paco Salazar, marking his first collaboration with the band. "Abrázame" served as the lead single in April 2020, followed by "Durante una Mirada" in September later that year. The band has also released a promotional single, "Te Pareces Tanto a Mí", in early July.

This album contains the first duet between lead vocalist Leire Martínez and the band's keyboardist, Xabi San Martín on the fourth track (and second single) of the album.

It is the final album with Leire as lead singer, following her departure from the band in October 2024.

== Production ==
The album title and its cover were first revealed by the band on 28 June 2020.

== Track listing ==
All music is composed by Haritz Garde, Álvaro Fuentes, Pablo Benegas and Xabi San Martín.

No.	Title	Lyrics	Length
1.	"Doblar y Comprender"	Benegas	4:19
2.	"Como un par de girasoles"	Benegas	3:13
3.	"Abrázame"	Benegas	3:56
4.	"Durante una Mirada"	San Martín	4:09
5.	"Galerna"	Benegas	3:10
6.	"Te Pareces Tanto a Mí"	Benegas	2:58
7.	"Menos Tú"	Benegas	3:14
8.	"Sirenas"	Benegas	3:40
9.	"Acantilado"	Benegas	4:08
10.	"Me Voy de Fiesta"	Benegas	2:14
11.	"¿Lo Ves?"	San Martín	3:28
Total length:			39:00

iTunes edition
No.	Title	Lyrics	Length
12.	"Abrázame" (acoustic version)	Benegas	3:48
13.	"Durante una Mirada" (acoustic version)	San Martín	3:50

== Charts ==
=== Weekly charts ===
Weekly chart performance for Un susurro en la tormenta
Chart (2020)	Peak position
Spanish Albums (PROMUSICAE)	1

=== Year-end charts ===
Year-end chart performance for Un susurro en la tormenta
Chart (2020)	Position
Spanish Albums (PROMUSICAE)	49

== Personnel ==
- Leire Martinez - lead vocals
- Xabier San Martin - keyboards, vocals (track 4)
- Pablo Benegas - guitars
- Álvaro Fuentes - bass
- Haritz Garde - drums
- Paco Salazar - producer
- Felipe Guevara - mixing
- Carlos Hernández - mastering
- Ted Jensen - mastering
- Sheila Platero - graphic design
- Pedro Walter - photography, art direction
