= A las cinco en el Astoria =

2008 studio album by La Oreja de Van Gogh

Studio album by La Oreja de Van Gogh
- Released: 2 September 2008 (Spain); 18 September 2008 (Mexico); 30 September 2008 (Worldwide)
- Recorded: Studios Du Manoir (France)
- Genres: Pop, power pop, electropop, pop rock
- Length: 51:01
- Language: Spanish
- Label: Sony BMG
- Producers: Nigel Walker; La Oreja de Van Gogh

La Oreja de Van Gogh chronology
| Guapa (2006) | A las cinco en el Astoria (2008) | Nuestra casa a la izquierda del tiempo (2009) |

Singles from A las cinco en el Astoria
- 1. "El último vals" Released: 15 July 2008; 2. "Inmortal" Released: 8 November 2008; 3. "Jueves" Released: 17 December 2008; 4. "Europa VII" Released: 26 April 2009; 5. "Más" Released: 19 October 2009 (Puerto Rico)

Professional ratings
Review scores
| Source | Rating |
|---|---|
| Allmusic | 3.5/5 stars |

A las cinco en el Astoria is the fifth full-length album released by La Oreja de Van Gogh, their second album to receive a Grammy nomination, and the first with new lead vocalist Leire Martínez. It was released in three editions: CD, CD+T-shirt, and Digipack. According to Promusicae, A las cinco en el Astoria was the 12th biggest selling album of 2008 in Spain.

== Information ==
A las cinco en el Astoria is the first album to feature Leire Martínez as the lead singer, replacing Amaia Montero, who had left in 2007. The first song released was "El Último Vals". The single was produced by Nigel Walker and La Oreja de Van Gogh. All songs are composed by the current members of the band. The album received a 2009 Latin Grammy nomination for Best Pop Album by a Duo/Group With Vocals.

The song "Jueves" became one of the best-known songs by the band, as it was a tribute to the victims of 11 March 2004 attacks in Madrid.

== Track listings ==
A las cinco en el Astoria – Standard edition
| No. | Title | Writer(s) | Length |
|---|---|---|---|
| 1. | "El Último Vals" | Xabi San Martín, Pablo Benegas | 3:25 |
| 2. | "Inmortal" | San Martín, Benegas | 4:06 |
| 3. | "Jueves" | San Martín | 3:59 |
| 4. | "Más" | San Martín, Benegas | 4:08 |
| 5. | "Cumplir un Año Menos" | San Martín | 3:34 |
| 6. | "Europa VII" | San Martín | 3:58 |
| 7. | "La Visita" | San Martín, Benegas | 3:25 |
| 8. | "Sola" | San Martín, Benegas | 3:41 |
| 9. | "Palabras para Paula" | San Martín, Benegas | 4:17 |
| 10. | "Flores en la Orilla" | San Martín, Benegas | 3:09 |
| 11. | "Un Cuento sobre el Agua" | San Martín | 3:44 |
| 12. | "La Primera Versión" | San Martín, Benegas | 5:40 |
| 13. | "20 Penas" (hidden track) | San Martín, Benegas | 4:01 |

A las cinco en el Astoria – iTunes Store Spain edition
| No. | Title | Writer(s) | Length |
|---|---|---|---|
| 14. | "Pequeños Momentos" | San Martín, Benegas | 4:06 |

== Chart performance ==
| Chart | Peak position |
|---|---|
| Argentinian Albums Chart | 1 |
| Mexican Album Chart | 20 |
| Spanish Album Chart | 1 |
| Chile | 10 |
| Venezuela | 10 |

== Sales and certifications ==
| Region | Certification | Certified units/sales |
|---|---|---|
| Mexico (AMPROFON) | Gold | 40,000^{^} |
| Spain (Promusicae) | 4× Platinum | 320,000^{‡} |
^{^} Shipments figures based on certification alone.^{‡} Sales+streaming figures based on certification alone.

== Awards ==
- Best Latin Album Pop 2009 A las cinco en el Astoria Nominated

== Personnel ==
- Leire Martinez - vocals
- Xabier San Martín - keyboards
- Pablo Benegas - guitars
- Álvaro Fuentes - bass
- Haritz Garde - drums
- Nigel Walker - producer
- Joaquín Pizarro - engineer
- Bob Ludwig - mastering
