= Muñeca de Trapo =

Single by La Oreja de Van Gogh

from the album Guapa
- Released: 20 February 2006
- Recorded: 2006
- Genre: Pop rock
- Length: 3:56 (album version); 3:52 (radio edit)
- Label: Sony BMG
- Songwriter: Pablo Benegas

La Oreja de Van Gogh singles chronology
| "Geografia" (2003) | "Muñeca de Trapo" (2006) | "Dulce Locura" (2006) |

"Muñeca de trapo" (Rag doll) is the first single from the fourth studio album by La Oreja de Van Gogh, Guapa. The song is known for its heavy sound, strong beat, and surging guitars. Its lyrics, in comparison to other songs by the band, deal with a more serious theme, in which a disregarded woman compares herself to a rag doll when she cannot express her feelings for her loved one, even though she loves him deeply, claiming "eres todo lo que más quiero, pero te pierdo en mis silencios" (You're the one I most love, but I lose you in my silence).

== Charts ==
| Chart (2006) | Peak position |
|---|---|
| US Hot Latin Songs (Billboard) | 12 |
| US Latin Pop Airplay (Billboard) | 3 |
| Venezuela Top Latino (Record Report) | 16 |
