= Lo Que te Conté Mientras te Hacías la Dormida =

2003 album by La Oreja de Van Gogh

Lo que te conté mientras te hacías la dormida

Studio album by La Oreja de Van Gogh
- Released: 28 April 2003
- Recorded: 2002–2003
- Studios: Studio du Manoir (Léon, Landes, France); Estudio Red Led (Madrid, Community of Madrid, Spain); Sterling Sound (New York City, United States)
- Genres: Pop rock; Latin; electropop
- Length: 53:48
- Language: Spanish
- Label: Sony
- Producers: Nigel Walker; La Oreja de Van Gogh

La Oreja de Van Gogh chronology
El viaje de Copperpot (2000)	Lo que te conté mientras te hacías la dormida (2003)	Guapa (2006)

Alternative cover
- French edition released under the name of París

Singles from Lo que te conté mientras te hacías la dormida
- 1. "Puedes contar conmigo" Released: 28 March 2003; 2. "20 de enero" Released: 14 July 2003; 3. "Rosas" Released: 20 October 2003; 4. "Deseos de cosas imposibles" Released: 26 January 2004; 5. "Vestido azul" Released: 22 March 2004; 6. "Geografía" Released: 2004; 7. "Historia de un sueño" Released: 2004; 8. "Bonustrack" Released: 2004

Lo que te conté mientras te hacías la dormida (Note: In this Spanish-language name the album title only keeps one capital letter at the beginning of the title.) (Spanish for What I told you while you pretended to be asleep) is the third studio album of Spanish band La Oreja de Van Gogh. It was released on 28 April 2003, through Sony Music label. It is the band's best-selling work internationally. It has also been certified as one of the best selling albums of all time in Spain. In France the album was released under the name of París, containing a mix of songs from this album and the previous one (El viaje de Copperpot, 2000).

A critical and commercial success, with only one single published before the release of the album, which was "Puedes contar conmigo", released on 28 March of the same year. It became a commercial success in Spain where it reached number one and overseas reaching number four in the United States.

Some time after the album was published new singles were released. "20 de enero" which reached number one in Spain as well as their prior release. "Rosas" which became an international and commercial success for the band both in America and Spain, reaching number four on US Hot Latin Songs and number one in Spain again. Over time, the single has become one of the band's signature songs as well as their most listened song across all platforms. "Deseos de cosas imposibles" was released to less commercial success in Spain although it peaked at 24 in United States.

Further singles including "Geografía", "Vestido azul", "Historia de un sueño" and "Bonustrack" were released to minor success globally but managed to be popular in Spain where some appeared on the charts the latter reaching number nine on Promusicae Top 100 Canciones.

Peaking at number one on the Spanish albums chart and number eight on US Top Latin Albums. Globally it is La Oreja de Van Gogh's second best-selling album with over two million copies sold worldwide. In Spain the album is one of the best selling albums of all time with a certification of 7× Platinum awarded by Promusicae for exceeding 700.000 copies sold. In Hispanic America, Lo que te conté mientras te hacías la dormida was well received, being certified as multi-platinum in countries such as Argentina, Mexico, Chile and platinum in Colombia.

== Background ==
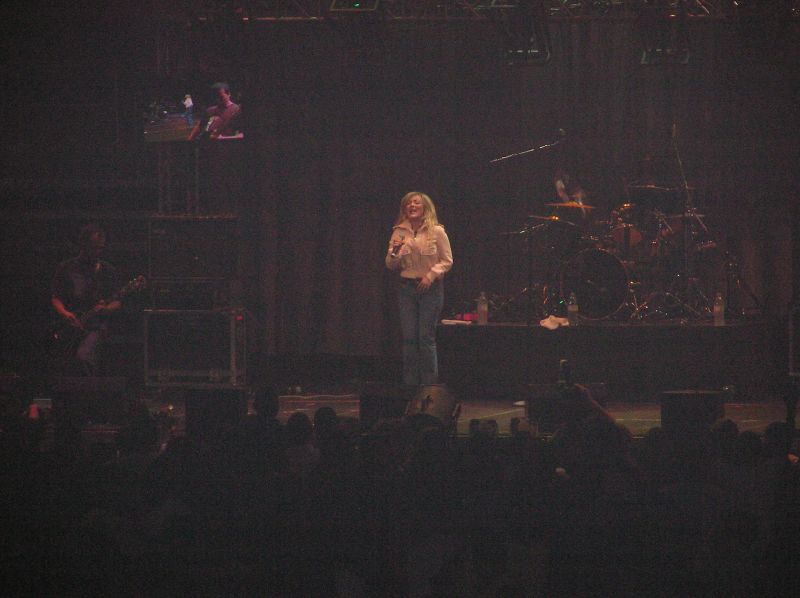
Amaia Montero on stage with group mates at Reventón Superestrella, 2004

On their previous album El viaje de Copperpot (2000), La Oreja de Van Gogh characterized their own pop rock and ballad sound similar to their first record Dile al sol (1998) while delved more into a Spanish pop rock style with songs such as "Cuídate" as well and power-ballads with songs like their hit "La playa".

However, when recording Lo que te conté mientras te hacías la dormida the band mixed their previous style of genres while exploring Electropop and Europop resulting in songs like "Puedes contar conmigo" which contains more of a pop rock style as well as receiving influences of electropop synthetizers. Other songs like "20 de enero" only keeps the synthpop/electropop style while "Rosas" sounds as similar as the style the band embarked on their last album. Other songs like "Bonustrack", "Geografía" and "Deseos de cosas imposibles" combines both styles characterizing it as the sound of the album.

== Reception ==
Lo que te conté mientras te hacías la dormida received positive critical success. In 2023, an article published by Rolling Stone Colombia magazine, remarking the Top 20 albums that turned twenty years old that same year, the album was mentioned and was describe as "A pop treasure full of metaphors telling everyday life situations in all of their 14 tracks". Jenny Gage from AllMusic rated the album 3.5 out of 5 stars. While the user rating of the website holds at 4.5 stars, La Oreja de Van Gogh’s highest ranking.

Lo que te conté mientras te hacías la dormida is La Oreja de Van Gogh's most accomplished album, and would be an excellent choice for an audience willing to lay the seductions of caliente aside in favor of a distinctly European and new wave-inflected cool

— Jenny Gage from AllMusic

== Singles and information ==
- "Puedes contar conmigo"

"Puedes contar conmigo" ("You Can Count on Me") was the first song released to promote the record being published on 28 March 2003, one month prior the album's release. It became a hit in Spain and in some territories overseas. Internationally the song became La Oreja de Van Gogh's first top ten on the Hot Latin Songs chart, reaching number five and spending eleven weeks on the chart. For the band, the song represented a new style from previous releases. It was well received and reached the number one in band's native Spain becoming the first number one of the album. Commercially the single was certified platinum for selling over 100.000 copies on both formats, physical and digital.

- "20 de enero"

"20 de enero" ("January, 20") was the first released on 14 July of that same year after the band's album was published. It was not received as well as "Puedes contar conmigo" internationally but still the single became a hit in Spain reaching the number one as well as their previous release. The single supposed a change with the band's style, embarking on a synthpop Europop style. "20 de enero" gains popularity around the time of the same date every year (as the track translates to 20 January) the last time to chart the song peaked at 113 on the daily most streamed songs on Spotify chart in Spain. Accumulating 84.931 streams on that day.

- "Rosas"

"Rosas" ("Roses") was released on 26 September 2003, as the album's third single. Not much after its release the song became a breakthrough hit that peaked number one in Spain and gave the band commercial success internationally. Especially Hispanic America, making the single the band's signature song outside Spain and the United States, where "Rosas" become the band's second and last top ten on the country to date. "Rosas" is also one of the most streamed Spanish-language songs from the 2000s as well as the best selling single of the band. The song's success boosted the album's sales helping the performance of the album on the charts and giving the band another commercial successful album. In the midst of 2024 a chart resurgence of «Rosas» in Hispanic America led the song to appear in the charts all around the continent as well as charting as high as the top 50 in countries like Costa Rica, Ecuador and Mexico. In Europe the song saw also a resurgence in Spain where the song peaked at 127 and accumulated 80,176 streams on 30 May 2024's Spotify daily chart.

- "Deseos de cosas imposibles"

"Deseos de cosas imposibles" ("Wishes of Impossible Things") was released as the follow-up song of "Rosas". It did not performed as good as the prior title commercially peaking at 19 in Spain, however internationally it was better received reaching number 24 in the United States. Despite lack of attention by the time of its release the song has become one of the most streamed tracks of the band. It broke the number one streak for the band's on the charts. A live version of "Deseos de cosas imposibles" alongside Argentinian Abel Pintos was included on the band's live album Primera fila (2012). When published the live version to YouTube, "Deseos de cosas imposibles" resurged in success, becoming La Oreja de Van Gogh's second most watched video after "Rosas".

- "Vestido azul"

"Vestido azul" ("Blue Dress") was released as the fifth single to promote Lo que te conté mientras te hacías la dormida it was released on 22 March 2004, almost one year after the release of "Puedes contar conmigo" to a minor success than the album's first releases. The song maintained the sound of the first two releases of the album as it's got synthesizers to some chorus on the song. In the charts the song did not do as great in performance, peaking at 17 in the Top 100 Canciones of PROMUSICAE.

- "Geografía"

"Geografía" was released as the sixth single on the album. Maintaining a classical pop-rock sound the song was produced and written all group members and Xabi San Martín on the production. Commercially "Geografía" peaked at 15, doing better than the previous release.

- "Historia de un sueño"

Translated as "History of a Dream" it was released as a result of the success of Lo que te conté mientras te hacías la dormida. The label kept releasing singles to maintain the album on the commercial focus, releasing "Historia de un sueño" as the album's seventh single.

- "Bonustrack"

"Bonustrack" was released as the eighth and final single to promote the album. It was written and produced by all group members with Xabi San Martín. At first the song was a hidden track only discovered when played the album. Later the label decided to release it to a better commercial performance than its previous releases becoming the first song to reach the top ten from the album since "Rosas". "Bonustrack" ended up peaking at number nine in its second charting week, spending two weeks among the ten most popular singles of the chart in Spain.

== French release ==
A work under the name of París was released to the French market. Issued by the band's label. Including the songs from Lo que te conté mientras te hacías la dormida but also featuring songs from their previous record El viaje de Copperpot (2000) and an additional version duet with Belgian singer Pablo Villafranca of the track «París».

The artwork from this project is the same as its Spanish release but changing the title to «París» and a lighter white color filter.

== Album cover ==
The album cover depicts band singer Amaia Montero sleeping sideways on a white bed. On the left, in the nightstand. A picture of the other members of the band can be found next to a glass half-filled with water and a daisy in it. The typography can be found in the middle of the picture with the title name. The same picture featuring a green filter is an alternative cover that can be seen alongside the original without filter.

== Track listing ==
Lo que te conté mientras te hacías la dormida – Standard edition
No.	Title	Writer(s)	Length
1.	"Puedes Contar Conmigo"	Amaia Montero	3:56
2.	"20 De Enero"	Montero; Xabi San Martín; Pablo Benegas	3:43
3.	"Rosas"	San Martín	3:56
4.	"Deseos De Cosas Imposibles"	San Martín	3:08
5.	"Geografía"	San Martín	3:17
6.	"Un Mundo Mejor"	Montero; San Martín; Benegas	3:38
7.	"Tú Y Yo"	Montero; San Martín; Benegas	3:21
8.	"La Esperanza Debida"	Montero; San Martín; Benegas	4:05
9.	"Vestido Azul"	Montero; San Martín; Benegas	3:10
10.	"Adiós"	Montero; San Martín; Benegas	3:47
11.	"Perdóname"	Montero; San Martín; Benegas	3:34
12.	"La Paz De Tus Ojos"	Montero; San Martín; Benegas	3:42
13.	"Nadie Como Tú"	Montero	3:24
14.	"Historia De Un Sueño"	San Martín	3:44
15.	"Bonustrack" (Hidden Track)	Montero; San Martín; Benegas	3:05

Paris – French edition
No.	Title	Writer(s)	Length
1.	"Paris (Dernier Rendez-vous)" (featuring Pablo Villafrancia)	Montero; San Martín; Benegas	3:46
2.	"Puedes contar conmigo"	Montero	3:56
3.	"Cuídate"	Montero; San Martín; Benegas	2:48
4.	"La playa"	San Martín	4:07
5.	"Deseos de cosas imposibles"	San Martín	3:08
6.	"Geografía"	San Martín	3:17
7.	"Rosas"	San Martín	3:56
8.	"Vestido azul"	Montero; San Martín; Benegas	3:10
9.	"Un mundo mejor"	Montero; San Martín; Benegas	3:38
10.	"Nadie como tú"	Montero	3:24
11.	"Desde el puerto"	Montero; San Martín; Benegas; Álvaro Fuentes; Haritz Garde	3:44
12.	"La chica del gorro azul"	Montero; San Martín; Benegas	3:35

== Personnel ==
=== Performing ===
- La Oreja de Van Gogh
  - Amaia Montero – vocals, backing vocals
  - Xabi San Martín – keyboards, backing vocals, programming
  - Pablo Benegas – guitar
  - Álvaro Fuentes – bass
  - Haritz Garde – percussion, programming
- Pablo Villafranca – vocals

=== Technical ===
- Nigel Walker – record production, audio mixing
- Bori Alarcón – technical production
- Damian Schuler – sound recording
- Rubén Suárez – sound recording
- George Marino – audio mastering

=== Design ===
- Jaume de Laiguana – photography, graphic design

== Charts ==
=== Weekly charts ===
Weekly chart performance for Lo que te conté mientras te hacías la dormida
Chart (2003–2005)	Peak position
Argentine Albums (CAPIF)	4
Chilean Albums (IFPI)	1
Paraguayan Albums (IFPI)	6
US Top Latin Albums (Billboard)	8

== Certifications and sales ==
Certifications and sales for Lo que te conté mientras te hacías la dormida
Region	Certification	Certified units/sales
Argentina (CAPIF)	4× Platinum	160,000^{^}
Chile	5× Platinum	88,000
Colombia	Platinum	20,000
Mexico (AMPROFON)	Platinum+Gold	225,000^{^}
Mexico (AMPROFON) Video	Gold	10,000^{^}
Spain (Promusicae)	6× Platinum	600,000^{^}
United States (RIAA)	2× Platinum (Latin)	200,000^{^}
^{^} Shipments figures based on certification alone.

== Awards ==
- Ondas Award Best album of 2003 (Won)
- Amigo Award to the best Spanish band (Won)
- Grammy Award for Best Latin Pop Album (Nominated)

== See also ==
1. List of best-selling albums in Spain
2. List of albums containing a hidden track
