= Inmortal (La Oreja de Van Gogh song) =

Single by La Oreja De Van Gogh

from the album A las cinco en el Astoria
- Released: 2009
- Recorded: 2008
- Genre: Pop rock
- Length: 4:06
- Label: Sony BMG
- Songwriter(s): Xabi San Martín, Pablo Benegas
- Producer(s): Nigel Walker, La Oreja De Van Gogh

La Oreja De Van Gogh singles chronology
"El Último Vals" (2008)	"Inmortal" (2009)	"Jueves" (2009)

"Inmortal" is the second single from the fifth studio album A las cinco en el Astoria by the Spanish pop/rock group La Oreja de Van Gogh. It was confirmed to be the second single by the group on 16 October. It was officially released on early November.

== Music video ==
The videoclip was filmed in Valparaíso, Chile. It begins with Leire singing under a colourful house with a red umbrella. Later the other members of the band appears with black umbrellas, and they start to play the song together. At the end of the video they appear on a Pacific beach with their umbrellas again. It's a very naive video that shows beautiful places of Chile.

It was released on 24 November 2008.

== Charts ==
Chart (2009)	Peak position
Mexico (Billboard Mexican Airplay)	12
Spain (PROMUSICAE)	10
US Hot Latin Songs (Billboard)	35
US Latin Pop Airplay (Billboard)	14
