= El planeta imaginario =

2016 studio album by La Oreja de Van Gogh

El Planeta Imaginario

Studio album by La Oreja de Van Gogh
- Released: 4 November 2016 (Spain)
- Recorded: Le Manoir de Lion, France
- Genre: Pop; Pop rock
- Length: 47:36
- Language: Spanish
- Label: Sony Music
- Producer: Áureo Baqueiro

La Oreja de Van Gogh chronology
Primera Fila (2013)	El Planeta Imaginario (2016)	Un susurro en la tormenta (2020)

Singles from El planeta imaginario
- 1. "Verano" Released: 16 September 2016; 2. "Diciembre" Released: 14 January 2017; 3. "Cuando Menos Lo Merezca" Released: 26 May 2017; 4. "Estoy Contigo" Released: 21 September 2017; 5. "Esa Chica" Released: 8 June 2018

El Planeta Imaginario is the seventh studio album by La Oreja de Van Gogh which was released on 4 November 2016 under Sony Music. The album was released five years after the previous one, after the band toured across Latin America and released two live albums. It was produced by Áureo Baqueiro, who produced Primera Fila, one of the live albums released by the band in 2013. "Verano" was chosen as the lead single.

For the first time, keyboardist Xabi San Martín sings one of the songs, the bonus track "Tan guapa", instead of lead vocalist Leire Martínez.

== Track listing ==
No.	Title	Lyrics	Music	Length
1.	"Estoy Contigo"	Pablo Benegas	Xabi San Martín	4:57
2.	"Diciembre"	Benegas	San Martín	3:45
3.	"Verano"	Benegas	San Martín, Áureo Baqueiro	4:22
4.	"Esa Chica"	San Martín	San Martín	4:45
5.	"Pálida Luna"	Benegas	San Martín	3:38
6.	"Camino De Tu Corazón"	Benegas	San Martín	3:19
7.	"Intocables"	Benegas	San Martín	4:28
8.	"No Vales Más Que Yo"	Benegas	San Martín	4:53
9.	"Cuando Menos Lo Merezca"	Benegas	San Martín	3:01
10.	"Mi Pequeño Gran Valiente"	San Martín	San Martín	4:08
11.	"Siempre"	Benegas	San Martín	3:19
12.	"Tan Guapa" (bonus track)	San Martín	San Martín	3:09

== Charts ==
=== Weekly charts ===
Weekly chart performance for El Planeta Imaginario
Chart (2016)	Peak position
Mexican Albums (AMPROFON)	2
Spanish Albums (Promusicae)	1
US Top Latin Albums (Billboard)	9

=== Monthly charts ===
Monthly chart performance for El Planeta Imaginario
Chart (2016)	Peak position
Argentine Monthly Albums (CAPIF)	8

=== Year-end charts ===
Year-end chart performance for El Planeta Imaginario
Chart (2016)	Position
Spanish Albums (PROMUSICAE)	44
Chart (2017)	Position
Spanish Albums (PROMUSICAE)	57

== Certifications ==
Region	Certification	Certified units/sales
Spain (Promusicae)	Gold	20,000^{‡}
^{‡} Sales+streaming figures based on certification alone.

== Personnel ==
- Leire Martinez - vocals
- Xabier San Martín - keyboards, composer
- Pablo Benegas - guitars, lyrics
- Álvaro Fuentes - bass
- Haritz Garde - drums
- Aureo Baqueiro - producer
- Jorge Velasco - engineer
- Orlando Vitto - engineer, mixing
- Ana Cassalett - assistant engineer
- Guillaume Delor-Aprile - assistant engineer
- Gavin Lurssen - mastering
- Jeremy Rubolino - string arrangements
- Juan Pérez-Fajardo - photography, artwork
- Álvaro Pérez-Fajardo - design
