= El viaje de Copperpot =

Studio album by La Oreja de Van Gogh
- Released: 11 September 2000
- Recorded: Studio du Manoir; Léon, Landes, France; Estudio Red Led; Madrid, Community of Madrid, Spain; Air Studios (Lyndhurst); London, England, United Kingdom
- Genres: Pop, alternative pop, pop rock, psychedelic rock
- Length: 52:52
- Language: Spanish
- Label: Epic
- Producer: Nigel Walker

La Oreja de Van Gogh chronology
Dile al sol (1998)	El viaje de Copperpot (2000)	Lo Que te Conté Mientras te Hacías la Dormida (2003)

Professional ratings
Review scores
Source	Rating
AllMusic	3/5 stars

El viaje de Copperpot (transl. Copperpot's Voyage) is the second studio album of Spanish pop rock band La Oreja de Van Gogh, issued by Epic Records on 11 September 2000. It was the band's first album to feature a bonus track. El viaje de Copperpot is the band's most successful album in Spain; after going platinum on its release day, it sold more than 1,300,000 copies and received a diamond certification. The album also catapulted the band's fame in Latin America going 3× Platinum in Mexico (under Mexican certification before 2001, 750,000 was 3× Platinum, but today it would be Diamond or 7× Platinum). Over 2,000,000 copies were sold worldwide. The album's title is inspired by Chester Copperpot, a scavenger in the film The Goonies.

It received generally favourable reviews from critics and produced eight Top 20 singles, including "Cuidate", "La Playa" and "Paris" which reached the No.1 spot on the Spain chart; as well as the hits "Mariposa" and "Soledad".

== Track listing ==
El viaje de Copperpot track listing
No.	Title	Lyrics	Music	Length
1.	"Cuídate"	Xabi San Martín	Amaia Montero, San Martín, Pablo Benegas	2:50
2.	"Soledad"	Benegas	Montero, San Martín	3:52
3.	"París"	Benegas	Montero, San Martín	3:46
4.	"La Playa"	San Martín	San Martín	4:07
5.	"Pop"	Benegas	Montero, San Martín	2:31
6.	"Dicen Que Dicen"	San Martín	Montero, San Martín	3:21
7.	"Mariposa"	Montero, San Martín	Montero, San Martín	4:02
8.	"La Chica Del Gorro Azul"	Benegas	Montero, San Martín	3:35
9.	"Tu Pelo"	Montero, San Martín	Montero, San Martín	3:57
10.	"Tantas Cosas Que Contar"	Benegas	Montero, San Martín	3:53
11.	"Los Amantes Del Círculo Polar"	Benegas	Montero, San Martín, Pablo Benegas	4:40
12.	"Desde El Puerto"	Montero, San Martín, Benegas	Montero, San Martín, Benegas	3:44
13.	"Tic Tac" (Hidden Track)	La Oreja de Van Gogh	La Oreja de Van Gogh

== Personnel ==
=== Performing ===
- La Oreja de Van Gogh
  - Amaia Montero – vocals, backing vocals
  - Xabi San Martín – keyboards, backing vocals, programming
  - Pablo Benegas – guitar
  - Álvaro Fuentes – bass
  - Haritz Garde – percussion

=== Technical ===
- Nigel Walker – record production, audio mixing
- Stefan Prin – technical production
- Rycky Graham – sound recording
- Rubén Suárez – sound recording
- Tony Cousins – audio mastering

=== Design ===
- Ricky Dávila – photography
- Lanzagorta Studios – graphic design

== Singles ==
- 2000 – Cuídate #1 (SPA), #1 (MEX)
- 2000 – París #1 (SPA), #1 (MEX)
- 2001 – La Playa #1 (SPA), #1 (MEX), #21 (US Latin)
- 2001 – Pop #1 (SPA)
- 2001 – Soledad #1 (SPA)
- 2001 – Mariposa #1 (SPA)
- 2001 – La Chica del Gorro Azul
- 2002 – Tu Pelo

=== Other song ===
- Los Amantes Del Circulo Polar #5 (SPA) #37 (US Latin)

== Charts ==
Chart (2000)	Peak position
Spain (AFYVE)	1

== Certifications and sales ==
Region	Certification	Certified units/sales
Mexico (AMPROFON)	2× Platinum	300,000^{^}
Spain (Promusicae)	11× Platinum	1,200,000
United States (RIAA)	Platinum (Latin)	100,000^{^}
^{^} Shipments figures based on certification alone.

== See also ==
- List of best-selling albums in Spain
- List of best-selling Latin albums
