= Leire Martínez =

Spanish singer and songwriter (born 1979)

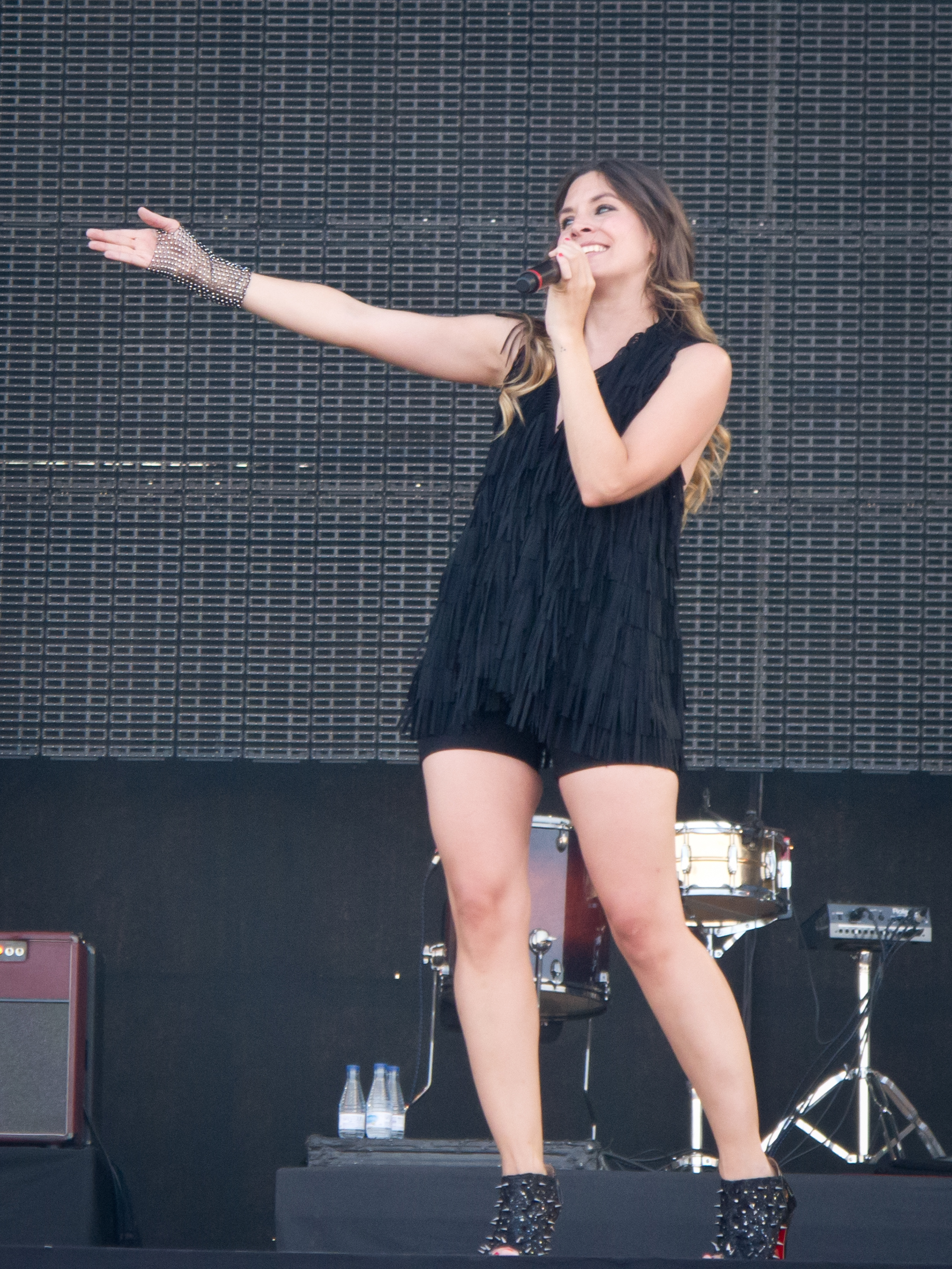

Background information
- Born: Leire Martínez Ochoa; 22 June 1979 (age 47); Errenteria, Gipuzkoa, Spain
- Origin: Basque Country, Spain
- Genre: Pop rock
- Occupations: Singer; songwriter; novelist
- Instrument: Vocals
- Years active: 2008–present
- Label: Sony BMG

Leire Martínez Ochoa (born 22 June 1979 in Errenteria, Gipuzkoa), is a Spanish singer, songwriter and was the lead vocalist of the band La Oreja de Van Gogh from 2008 to 2024.

She participated in the television show Factor X in 2007 performing covers of Julieta Venegas, Vanessa Paradis and Lisa Stansfield. She was eliminated on the 6th week. In 2008, after her performances in Factor X, Leire was selected to replace Amaia Montero in La Oreja de Van Gogh.

With Leire, the band released the albums A Las Cinco En El Astoria, Cometas Por El Cielo, El Planeta Imaginario and Un Susurro En La Tormenta, the last of which became her final album with the band.

== Discography ==
=== With La Oreja de Van Gogh ===
- 2008: A Las Cinco En El Astoria
- 2009: Nuestra Casa A La Izquierda Del Tiempo
- 2011: Cometas Por El Cielo
- 2016: El Planeta Imaginario
- 2020: Un Susurro En La Tormenta

=== As a solo singer ===
==== Studio albums ====
List of studio albums, with selected details and chart positions
| Title | Details | Peaks |
| Title | Details | SPA |
|---|---|---|
| Historias De Aquella Niña | Released: February 20, 2026; Label: Sony Music Spain; Formats: CD, digital download, streaming, LP | 3 |

==== Singles ====
List of singles, with selected chart positions
| Title | Year | Peak chart positions | Certifications | Album |
| Title | Year | SPA | Certifications | Album |
|---|---|---|---|---|
| "Mi Nombre" | 2025 | 50 | PROMUSICAE: Gold | Historias De Aquella Niña |
| "Tres Deseos" | 2025 | — | | Historias De Aquella Niña |
| "Tonto Por Ti" (with Abraham Mateo) | 2025 | — | | Historias De Aquella Niña |
| "No Se Me Da Bien Odiarte" (with Edurne) | 2025 | — (Note: "No Se Me Da Bien Odiarte" did not enter the Spanish Singles Chart, but peaked at number 25 on the Spanish Airplay Chart.) | | Historias De Aquella Niña |
| "El Ruido" (with Miranda!) | 2026 | — | | Historias De Aquella Niña |
| "Cabeza De Ratón" | 2026 | — (Note: "Cabeza De Ratón" did not enter the Spanish Singles Chart, but peaked at number 9 on the Spanish Airplay Chart.) | | Historias De Aquella Niña |
| "Quédate En Su Voz" | 2026 | — (Note: "Quédate En Su Voz" did not enter the Spanish Singles Chart, but peaked at number 28 on the Spanish Airplay Chart.) | | Non-album single |
"—" denotes a recording that did not chart or was not released in that territory.

=== As featured artist ===
List of singles, with selected chart positions
| Title | Year | Peak chart positions | Certifications | Album |
| Title | Year | SPA | Certifications | Album |
|---|---|---|---|---|
| "Dena Hankaz Gora" (with Mikel Markez) | 1999 | — | | Zure Begiek |
| "La Cosa Más Bella" (with Sergio Dalma) | 2011 | — | | Vía Dalma |
| "Goodbye" (with Beto Cuevas) | 2012 | — | | Transformación |
| "No Te Marches Jamás" (with David DeMaría) | 2014 | — | | Spanish Affair |
| "Hecho Con Tus Sueños" (with Efecto Pasillo) | 2014 | — | | Non-album single |
| "Cuando Todas Las Historias Se Acaban" (with Maldita Nerea) | 2017 | — (Note: "Cuando Todas Las Historias Se Acaban" did not enter the Spanish Singles Chart, but peaked at number 24 on the Spanish Airplay Chart.) | PROMUSICAE: Gold | Bailarina |
| "Volver A Empezar" (with Funambulista) | 2017 | — | | Dual |
| "Dejarte Ir" (with Blas Cantó) | 2018 | — | | Complicados |
| "Contigo" (with Marlon) | 2018 | — | | Cosas Que No Se Pagan Con Dinero |
| "Tuvo Su Tiempo" (with Diego Martín) | 2021 | — | | 14.09.18 |
| "Himno A La Alegría" (with Various Artists) | 2021 | — | PROMUSICAE: Gold | Non-album single |
| "Celebraré" (with Conchita) | 2021 | — | | Non-album single |
| "Mariposas" (with Saiko) | 2025 | — | | Natsukashii Yoru |
| "Mi Nombre" (with Operación Triunfo Cast 2025) | 2025 | — | | OT Gala 5 |
| "Cuando Te Quieras Marchar" (with Pole.) | 2025 | — | | Punto Cero |
| "Bila Nazazu" (with Arima) | 2026 | — | | Non-album single |
"—" denotes a recording that did not chart or was not released in that territory.
