= La Oreja de Van Gogh =

Spanish pop band

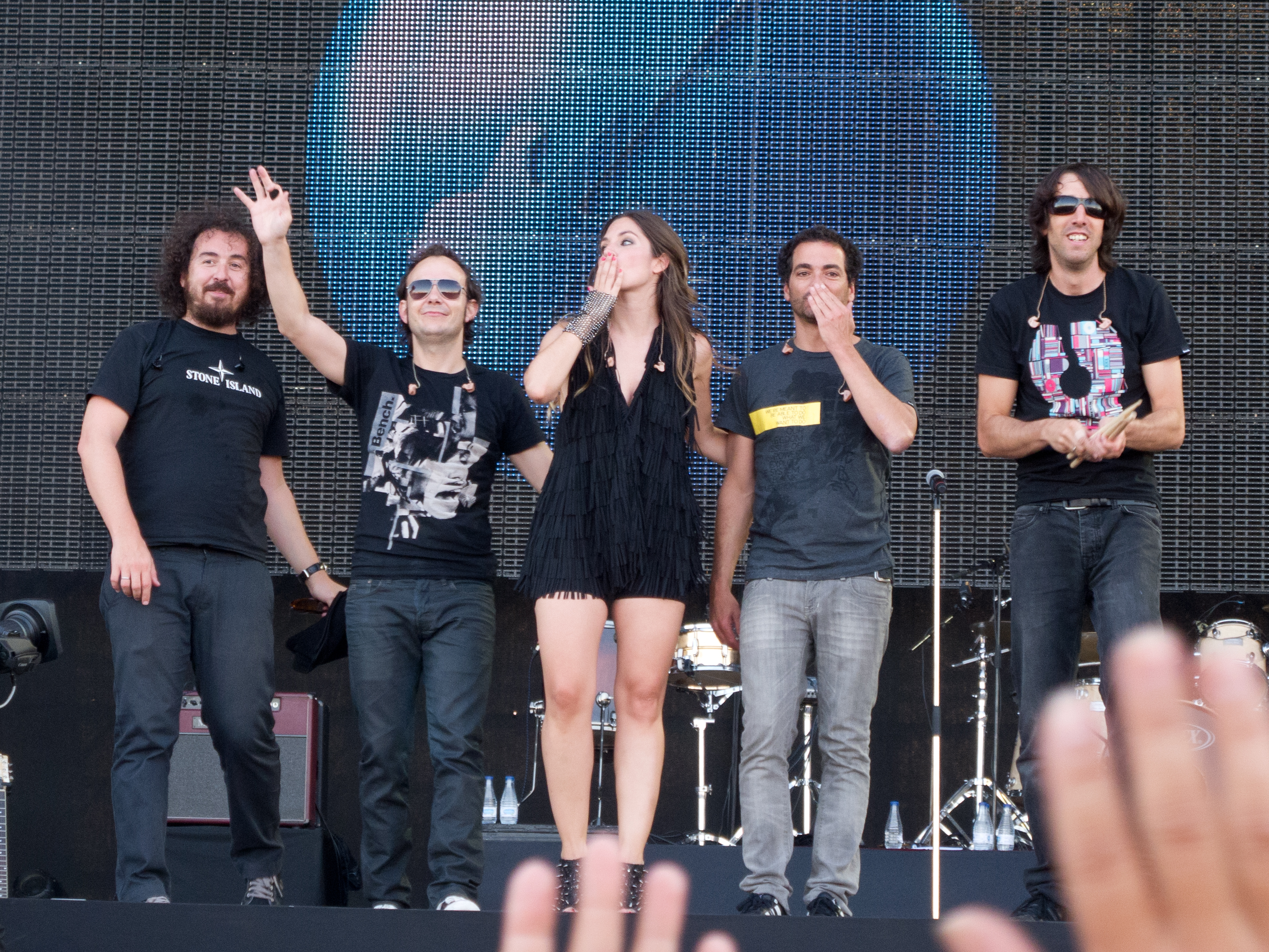
- La Oreja de Van Gogh in 2012. From left to right: Xabi San Martín, Pablo Benegas, Leire Martínez, Álvaro Fuentes and Haritz Garde.

Background information
- Also known as: LOVG
- Origin: San Sebastián, Gipuzkoa, Basque Country, Spain
- Genres: Pop rock
- Years active: 1996–present
- Members: Amaia Montero; Álvaro Fuentes; Xabi San Martín; Haritz Garde; Imanol Goikoetxea
- Past members: Leire Martínez; Pablo Benegas; Luis Meyer
- Website: laorejadevangogh.com

La Oreja de Van Gogh (Spanish pronunciation: [la oˈɾexa ðe βaŋ ˈɡoɣ]; English: "Van Gogh's Ear") is a pop band from San Sebastián, Basque Country, Spain. The lyrical themes of their songs typically include love, friendship and relationships. They have released 9 studio albums and have achieved commercial success with the singles "Puedes Contar Conmigo" (2003), "Rosas" (2003), "Muñeca de Trapo" (2006), "Dulce Locura" (2006), "El Último Vals" (2008), and "Inmortal" (2009).

The lead singer of the band is Amaia Montero, who was one of the band's founders in 1996 until she first left in 2007 (to pursue a solo career) and returned in 2025. From 2008 to 2024, the lead singer of the band was Leire Martínez. The band officially announced Montero's return as well as Benegas' temporary break on 15 October 2025. The band's lyrics and compositions are written primarily by Xabi San Martín as well as by Pablo Benegas.

== History ==
=== Fronted by Amaia Montero (1996–2007, 2025-present) ===
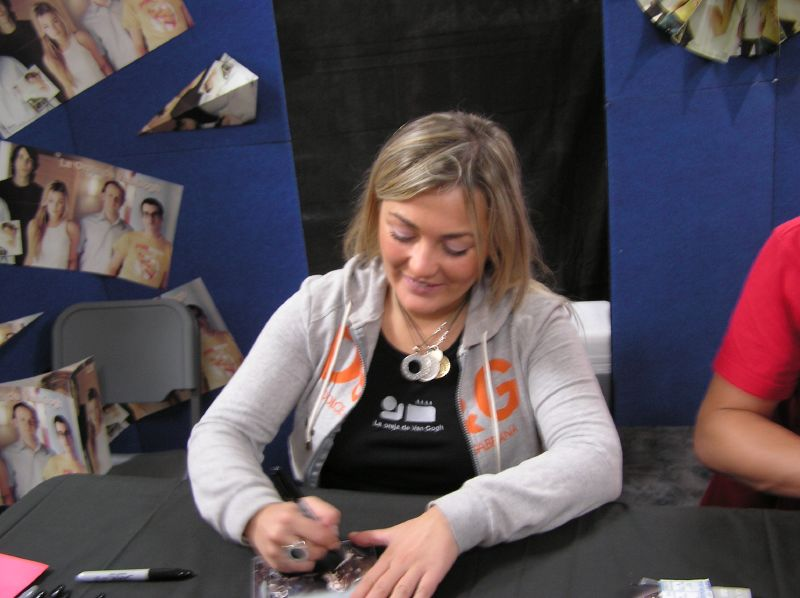
Amaia Montero in 2004

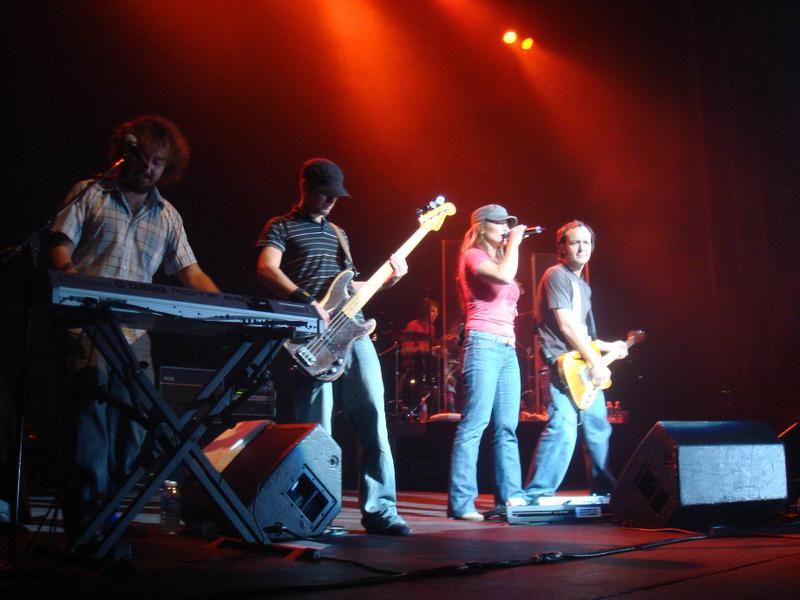
The group in 2006

The band was formed under the name Los Sin Nombre (The Nameless) in 1996 by four college students from San Sebastián: Xabi San Martín (keyboard), Pablo Benegas (guitar), Álvaro Fuentes (bass guitar) and Haritz Garde (drums). They recorded cover versions of songs from bands such as U2, Pearl Jam and Nirvana, usually with San Martín providing lead vocals.

As they began to write songs, the band wanted to recruit a female lead vocalist. They met Amaia Montero at a friend's party, and after listening to her sing "Nothing Compares 2 U" by Sinéad O'Connor, Benegas convinced her to join the group. She subsequently became the lead singer of the band. Montero suggested La Oreja de Van Gogh as the name of the band, inspired by the story of Vincent van Gogh severing one of his ears.

The band rose to prominence when it won a local pop-rock music festival in San Sebastian, giving the group the chance to record a 4-song EP. This encouraged the band to send some of their songs to major record companies, with Sony Music-scout Jennifer Ces being the first one interested in the band after listening to only one of the band's songs. She urged them to send her more of their songs to see if they had enough material for an LP. After composing and submitting over 20 tracks in a very short period of time, Ces reacted very positively and signed the band to Epic Records, a subsidiary of Sony.

In 1998, La Oreja de Van Gogh released its debut album Dile al sol, produced by Alejo Stivel, earning praise from contemporary critics and performing well in the Spanish Albums Chart. The album sold more than 800,000 copies and was certified 7-time platinum, and the band received an Ondas Award for Best New Act.

The success of the band was further increased with the 2000 release of El viaje de Copperpot, a reference to the character Chester Copperpot from the 1985 film The Goonies, followed by Lo que te conté mientras te hacías la dormida in 2003. Both albums were produced by Nigel Walker and sold more than 2 million copies worldwide each, establishing La Oreja de Van Gogh as one of the most popular bands in Spain and in Latin America. El viaje de Copperpot was certified diamond in Spain for shipments of over 1,000,000, and singles "La Playa", "Puedes Contar Conmigo" and "Rosas", amongst others, were international hits in most Spanish-speaking countries.

In 2006, the band released its fourth and last studio album with Amaia Montero. Guapa was the best-selling album of 2006 in Spain and won a Latin Grammy for Best Pop Album by a Duo or Group and a 40 Principales Award for Best Spanish Album. Singles "Muñeca de Trapo" and "Dulce Locura" were also very successful, peaking at number 1 in many charts, including the Mexican Singles Chart and the Argentinian Charts. Late in the same year, the band re-released the album as a new edition called Más Guapa, which included a second disc with tracks made for but cut from all of the band's albums since 1998, including both unreleased songs and some alternative versions of previously released tracks. "En Mi Lado del Sofá" was released as ther band's last single before replacing Montero as lead singer.

Almost 18 years after Montero left the band, on 14 October 2025, following the band's post deletion on most social media about Leire's dismissal, a short video was uploaded which was accompanied by a lengthy message on their website, announcing the return of original lead singer Amaia Montero and Pablo Benegas' temporary break from the band to focus on other projects. The announcement had a mixed reception from fans.

On 31 December 2025, the band released their first single in over four years and the first with Amaia as lead singer since her return, "Todos Estamos Bailando La Misma Canción," produced and mixed by Paco Salazar and recorded at Higain Studios near Donosti.

=== Fronted by Leire Martínez (2008–2024) ===
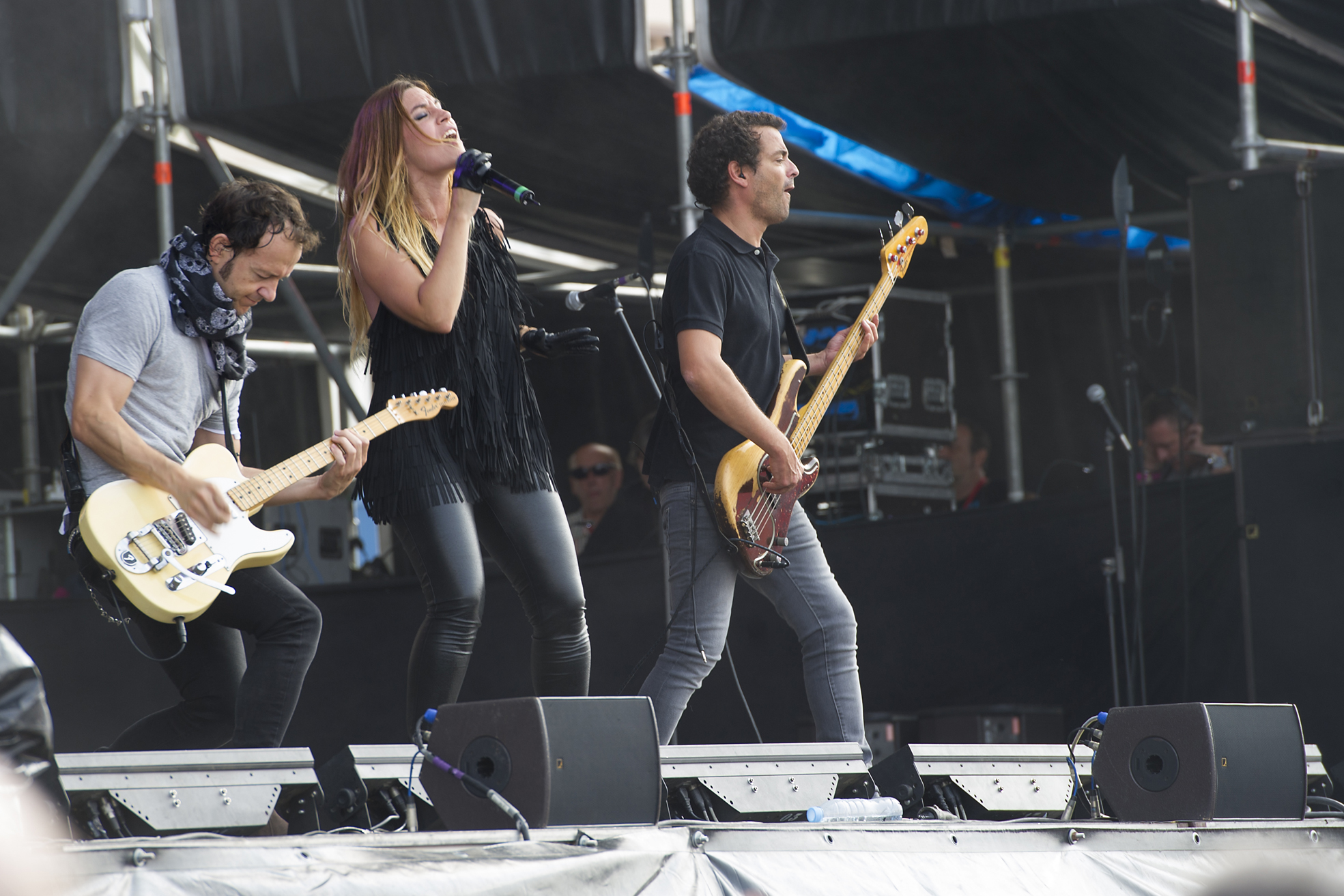
The group in 2013 at the Gibraltar Music Festival.

In 2007, Amaia Montero left the group and Xabi, Pablo, Álvaro and Haritz held an audition for a new vocalist. In July 2008, Leire Martínez, a contestant on Factor X, joined the band as lead singer. The song "El Último Vals" was the first single of their album A las cinco en el Astoria. In 2009, they released Nuestra casa a la izquierda del tiempo, which consisted of re-recordings of their older songs with Martinez, the new vocalist, plus one new song.

Their next studio album was Cometas por el cielo, released in 2011, with the first single sharing the name of the album. By then, the band had sold more than 8 million albums worldwide. In 2013, they released a live album called Primera Fila, a live recording of previous songs as well as some new tracks including the single "El primer día del resto de mi vida".

In 2016, they released El planeta imaginario, with a tour starting that December. On 13 April 2020, the group released "Abrázame", the first single of their new album, Un susurro en la tormenta, that was released in September 2020. On 2 July, the band released another song, "Te pareces tanto a mí".

In October 2024, Leire and the group parted ways.

== Members ==
Current members

- Amaia Montero – lead vocals (1996–2007; 2025–present)
- Xabi San Martín – keyboards (1996–present)
- Álvaro Fuentes – bass (1996–present)
- Haritz Garde – drums (1996–present)
- Imanol Goikoetxea – guitars (2025-present)

Former members

- Pablo Benegas – guitars (1996–2025; on hiatus 2025–present)
- Leire Martínez – lead vocals (2008–2024)
- Luis Meyer – guitars (1996)

Timeline

== Discography ==
Studio albums

- Dile al sol (1998)
- El viaje de Copperpot (2000)
- Lo Que te Conté Mientras te Hacías la Dormida (2003)
- Guapa (2006)
- A las Cinco en el Astoria (2008)
- Nuestra casa a la izquierda del tiempo (2009)
- Cometas por el cielo (2011)
- El Planeta Imaginario (2016)
- Un susurro en la tormenta (2020)

== Filmography ==
- 1999: Dile al sol - VHS
- 2002: El viaje de Copperpot - VHS & DVD
- 2003: Lo que te conté mientras te hacías la dormida, Gira 2003 CD+DVD
- 2010: Un viaje por el Mar Muerto, their first full-length feature film, which was filmed in Israel in collaboration with other artists. Included as a bonus disc in the special edition of Nuestra casa a la izquierda del tiempo.
- 2012: Cometas por el Cielo - En directo desde America: Second CD-DVD filmed in Mexico and in Argentina.
