= Amaia Montero =

Spanish singer (born 1976)

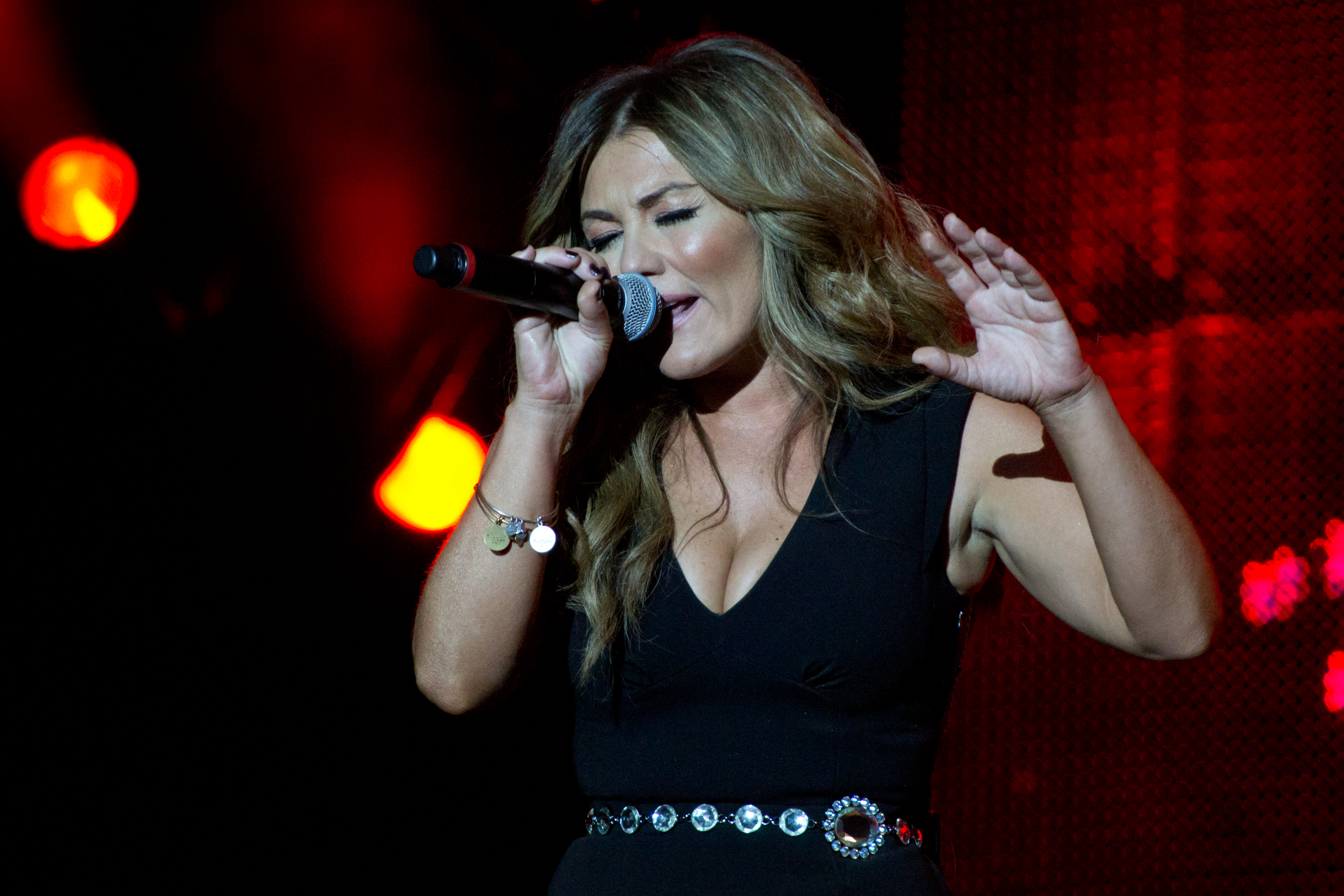
- Amaia Montero during Rock in Rio Madrid 2012

Background information
- Born: Amaia Montero Saldías; 26 August 1976 (age 50); Irun (Gipuzkoa), Spain
- Origin: Basque Country, Spain
- Genres: Pop rock
- Occupations: Musician; singer; songwriter
- Instruments: Vocals; guitar; keyboard
- Years active: 1996–2020 (Note: Indefinite hiatus); 2024–present
- Label: Sony BMG
- Members: La Oreja de Van Gogh
- Website: amaiamontero.com

Amaia Montero Saldías (Spanish pronunciation: [aˈmaja monˈteɾo salˈdi.as]; born 26 August 1976) is a Spanish singer mainly known as the lead vocalist of the Spanish pop-band La Oreja de Van Gogh from 1996 to 2007, and 2025 onwards.

Amaia has sung in a variety of languages, including Basque, Spanish, Catalan, Italian, French and English. She also wrote some of the most successful singles of the band on their original versions, including "Mariposa" (2000) and "Puedes Contar Conmigo" (2003) among many others. Including her work with the band, Montero has sold over 10 million albums worldwide.

== Background ==
Amaia Montero is the daughter of José Montero and Pilar Saldías, and has an older sister named Idoia. She attended UPV/EHU studying Chemistry, where she met the rest of the members of La Oreja de Van Gogh. When the band became famous, she switched studies to Psychology at the UNED. She later stopped studying.

Montero had nodules in her throat in 1998, when the album Dile al sol was recorded, but the nodules were removed after the first tour.

== Music career ==
=== 1996–2007: La Oreja de Van Gogh ===
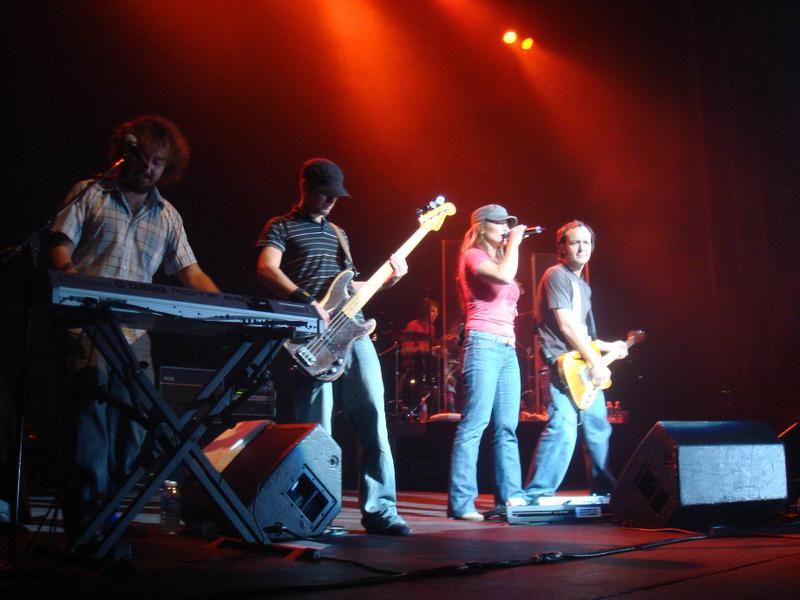
Montero performing with La Oreja de Van Gogh in 2006.

"La Oreja de Van Gogh" was formed in 1996, after guitarist Pablo Benegas, bassist Álvaro Fuentes, keyboardist Xabi San Martín, and drummer Haritz Garde met at a local university. They used to record covers of songs from local bands, like Soziedad Alkoholika and international rock bands, such as U2, Janis Joplin, Tool, Pearl Jam and Nirvana, usually with San Martín providing lead vocals. Amaia Montero joined the band subsequently, following an invitation by Benegas. The two met at a dinner party after he heard Montero singing Sinéad O'Connor's "Nothing Compares 2 U".

After experimenting with band names, such as "Los Sin Nombre" they decided on La Oreja de Van Gogh which means Van Gogh's ear.

In 1998, the band was signed by Sony BMG after they won a Rock music competition in San Sebastián. Amaia then completed work on the band's first album Dile al sol, which sold about 800,000 copies in Spain, making it the 20th best-selling album in Spanish history.

La Oreja de Van Gogh's second studio album, released on 11 September 2000, received the name of El viaje de Copperpot (Copperpot's Journey). This album was highly successful, selling more than 1,200,000 copies in Spain, becoming the 8th best-selling album of all time there, being certified Diamond. It sold 750,000 copies in Mexico going 3× Platinum (under Mexican certification before 2001, 750,000 was 3× Platinum, but today it would be double Diamond), and more than 2,000,000 worldwide.

In 2001, they won an award for Best Spanish Act at the MTV Europe Music Awards held in Germany.

In 2003, they released their third album Lo que te conté mientras te hacías la dormida. It was their first album to sell impressively in the Americas, with over 100,000 copies sold in the States alone, and more than 2,500,000 copies worldwide. Eight singles from the album charted in Spain, four of them reaching number one. It became the 45th best-selling album of all time in Spain, while the band continued to break into the Latin American markets, including the States. It remains as the best-selling album of the 21st Century in Chile.

They won several awards in the wake of the album, including an award for Best Group or Duet at the MTV Video Music Awards Latinoamérica 2004, and an Ondas Award for Best Album. The album also received a Grammy Award nomination, for Best Latin Album. With this release the band took the live act to France, where they played at the mythical Olympia in Paris, after their sold-out show in La Cigale, and the group continued to win fans in France, Italy, Germany and Switzerland. Also tours in the U.S. where they performed in New York, Los Angeles, Miami, Boston, Chicago, Puerto Rico, Phoenix and Texas after their album "Lo Que te Conté Mientras Te Hacías La Dormida" went Platinum in that country. More concerts in Mexico and South America followed in 2005, including a sold-out concert at Luna Park in Argentina, and two shows with crowds of over 30,000 each concert in Chile, where they received all possible audience acceptance awards when they performed at the 2005 Viña del Mar International Song Festival, taming the usually demanding crowd (traditionally called "El Monstruo", or "The Monster", because of their enthusiasm) and from there they travelled to Japan to play a sold-out show in Tokyo on 25 July 2005.

In 2006, Amaia Montero and La Oreja de Van Gogh, released their fourth and last work together called Guapa. This album was highly successful too, becoming the 47th best-selling album of all time in Spain, being certified 7× platinum there; it went 2× platinum in Mexico, platinum in Argentina and Chile, and Gold in Colombia and the United States. Sony Music issued a special edition of this album for the Italian market as well. In 2006, the band won a Latin Grammy Award for Best Pop Album By a Duo or Group, a second nomination at the MTV Europe Music Awards for Best Spanish Act, 3 nominations at the MTV Video Music Awards Latinoamérica 2006 for Artist of the Year, Best Group or Duet and Best Pop Artist. And in 2007 they received all audience acceptance awards at Viña del Mar International Song Festival 07. The Guapa Tour went through Latin America, USA and parts of Europe, with more than 50 shows in Spain.

In 2007, La Oreja de Van Gogh with Amaia as lead singer, became the 16th best-selling music artists of all time in Spain.

=== 2007–present: solo career ===
Amaia announced her departure from the group on 19 November 2007, to launch a solo career. La Oreja de Van Gogh remained active and released four studio albums with a second lead singer Leire Martínez.

==== Amaia Montero ====
Montero recorded her first solo album in the Italian cities of Genoa and Milan, and mixed the songs at Henson Recording Studios in Los Angeles. This new record came after the 11 years filled with hits with La Oreja de Van Gogh. It was released on 18 November 2008 in Spain and went to number one there, selling 40,000 copies in its first week. The album had sold one million copies overall.

I will never forget this first album. I had to start from scratch and mature all of a sudden. I tried to make an honest record, supported by an artistic impulse aimed to express exactly how I am. I needed to follow my own journey, and I faced the risk. This album shows exactly what I am and what I do

— Amaia Montero says about her album.

The self-titled album contains eleven songs composed by Montero. She dedicates a song to her former bandmates (Tulipán) and to her father (lupe) who was diagnosed with cancer in 2006. "Quiero Ser" was the first single released from the album, which peaked at number one in Spain, in its first week. In January 2009, "Quiero Ser" became the longest charting number one single in Spanish airplay history with 13 consecutive weeks in the number one spot.

The same month, Montero started making it the international promotion of her debut solo album. After three weeks of promotion she had to stop the tour, and cited personal reasons. A few days later Diariovasco.com confirmed the death of Amaia's father.

Amaia Montero performed for the first time in her solo tour with Kudai & 84 in the Peruvian city Cusco. Movistar promoted her tour 2009 that continues in Peru, Ecuador, Panama, Costa Rica, Nicaragua, Mexico, Colombia, Venezuela, Uruguay, Argentina, Chile and Spain.

In 2010 she released a recording of the Spanish version of the ABBA song Chiquitita as a single, which then became a number one hit in the Spanish charts.

==== 2 ====
Amaia Montero's second solo album 2 was released on 8 November 2011 with the lead single being Caminando.

In 2012, she recorded a cover of "Moon River" in Catalan entitled "Riu de lluna", for the CD of TV3's telethon La Marató.

=== 2020: Composing a new album and taking a break ===
In February 2020, Amaia Montero announced on social media that she was in the process of composing what would be her fifth solo studio album. Montero described the moment as being "caught between melodies and chords". In 2022, Amaia began promoting her new single, but a few weeks later she started posting several photos and videos on her social media accounts showing her looking very dishevelled and in a poor mental state, caused by severe stress and anxiety. In December 2023, via Instagram, she was seen returning to her professional career with a cover of the song 'Moon River' as the soundtrack for a Telefónica advert, celebrating the company's 100th anniversary and featuring the artistic collaboration of Xabi San Martín.

On 21 July 2024, after five years away from the stage and two years away from social media to take care of her health, Amaia Montero was one of the special guests at the second concert at the Santiago Bernabéu Stadium on Colombian artist Karol G 'Mañana será Bonito Europe Tour'. The two artists performed the song "Rosas" together in front of 70,000 people.

In September 2024, acting as an intermediary for Amaia Montero, Rafa Cano announced on a Cadena Dial programme that there would be musical news before the end of the year.

On 29 October 2024, Amaia Montero released the song "Tormenta Perfecta" as a surprise on all digital platforms, reaching No. 3 on iTunes. She composed the single in 2014, recorded and mastered it, but did not include it on the album Si Dios Quiere Yo también because she selected only 10 songs, among which Azul Eléctrico and Tormenta Perfecta were not included. However, she sang the former at her promotional concerts, and we were able to hear Tormenta Perfecta thanks to short snippets she shared on her Twitter account.

On 30 December 2024, Amaia Montero officially announced her return to music via her Instagram account with an emotional message of hope for 2025, when she will return to the stage, this time to present her new album. Later, she was a guest singer in the Mañana Será Bonito World Tour, by Karol G and debuted her old music with La Oreja de Van Gogh.

== Discography ==
=== With La Oreja de Van Gogh ===
- 1998: Dile al sol
- 2000: El viaje de Copperpot
- 2003: Lo que te conté mientras te hacías la dormida
- 2006: Guapa

=== As a solo singer ===
- 2008: Amaia Montero
- 2011: 2
- 2014: Si Dios quiere, yo también
- 2018: Nacidos para creer

== Other projects ==
Montero has appeared with other singers on projects including:

- Álex Ubago - "Sin miedo a nada, Los abrazos rotos"
- El Canto del Loco - "Puede ser"
- José Luis Perales - "Porque te vas"
- Rocío Durcal - "Me gustas mucho"
- Alejandro Fernández - "Me dediqué a perderte"
- Eros Ramazzotti - "Está pasando noviembre"
- Presuntos Implicados - "Samurai"
- Miguel Bosé - "Sevilla"
- Tiziano Ferro - "El Regalo Más Grande"
- Franco De Vita - "Si Tú No Estás"
