= Belanova discography =

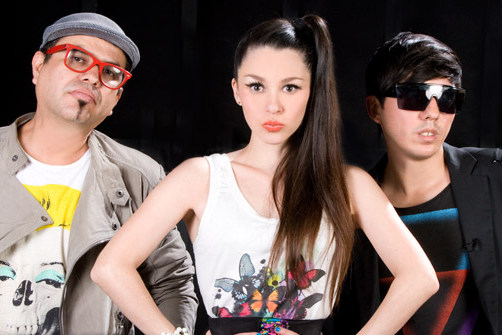
- Studio albums: 6
- Live albums: 3
- Singles: 15
- Video albums: 3
- Music videos: 19
- Promotional Singles: 15

The discography of Mexican synthpop group Belanova includes five studio albums, two live albums, three DVDs, and numerous singles and music videos.

== Albums ==
All regularly released albums and their chartpositions in Mexico (MEX), U.S. Billboard Top Latin Albums (USA),

=== Studio albums ===
List of studio albums, with selected chart positions and certifications
Title	Album details	Peak chart positions		Certifications
Title	Album details	MEX	USA	Certifications
Cocktail	Released: 14 February 2003; Formats: CD, Digital Download	5	–	AMPROFON: Gold
Dulce Beat	Released: 21 June 2005; Formats: CD, Digital Download	1	59	AMPROFON: 2× Platinum
Fantasía Pop	Released: 10 September 2007; Formats: CD, Digital Download	1	18	AMPROFON: Gold
Sueño Electro I	Released: 25 October 2010; Formats: CD, Digital Download	6	5	
Sueño Electro II	Released: 6 September 2011; Formats: CD, CD+DVD, Digital Download	19	15	
Viaje al Centro del Corazón	Released: 15 June 2018; Formats: CD, Digital Download	1	3	
"—" denotes a recording that did not chart or was not released in that territory.

=== Live albums ===
List of studio albums, with selected chart positions and certifications
Title	Album details	Peak chart positions		Certifications
Title	Album details	MEX	USA	Certifications
Dulce Beat Live	Live Album; Released: 1 November 2006; Formats: CD+DVD, DVD, Digital Download	11	–	
Tour Fantasía Pop	Live Album; Released: 9 December 2008; Formats: CD+DVD, Digital Download	27	–	
Canciones Para La Luna – Sinfónico en Vivo	Live Album; Released: 8 October 2013; Formats: CD+DVD, Digital Download	–	–	AMPROFON: Platinum
"—" denotes a recording that did not chart or was not released in that territory.

== Singles ==
All regularly released singles and their chart positions in U.S. Billboard Hot Latin Songs (US Hot Latin Songs), U.S. Billboard Latin Pop Airplay (US Latin Pop Airplay), Spanish Official Top 20 Airplay Chart (SPA),

List of Spanish singles, with selected chart positions and certifications, showing year released and album name
Title	Year	Peak positions				Certifications	Album
Title	Year	MEX	US Hot Latin Songs	COL	CAL	Certifications	Album
"Tus Ojos"	2003	1	–	1	–		Cocktail
"Suele Pasar"	2003	17	–	2	–		Cocktail
"Aún Así Te Vas"	2004	23	17	14	–		Cocktail
"Me Pregunto"	2005	2	12	–	26	AMPROFON: 2× Platinum	Dulce Beat
"Por Ti"	2005	1	11	29	22		Dulce Beat
"Rosa Pastel"	2006	4	5	7	7		Dulce Beat 2.0
"Niño"	2006	7	9	–	–		Dulce Beat Live
"Baila Mi Corazón"	2007	1	9	30	15	AMPROFON: 9× Platinum + Gold (Ringtone)	Fantasía Pop
"Cada Que..."	2007	1	3	17	9		Fantasía Pop
"One, Two, Three, Go! (1, 2, 3, Go!)"	2008	1	6	52	34		Fantasía Pop
"Paso El Tiempo"	2008	5	23	–	49		Tour Fantasía Pop
"Nada De Más"	2010	3	15	–	–		Sueño Electro I
"No Me Voy a Morir"	2010	1	26	–	68		Sueño Electro I
"Mariposas"	2011	8	23	78	75		Sueño Electro II
"Hasta El Final"	2011	23	21	–	–		Sueño Electro II
Solo Dos (Live)	2013	–	–	–	–		Canciones Para La Luna – Sinfónico en Vivo
Por Ti (Live)	2013	–	–	–	–		Canciones Para La Luna – Sinfónico en Vivo
No Voy a Para (feat. Jay de La Cueva)	2014	–	–	–	–		Canciones Para La Luna – Sinfónico en Vivo
Cásate Conmigo	2016	–	–	–	–		Viaje al Centro del Corazón
Nada Es Igual	2018	–	–	–	–		Viaje al Centro del Corazón
Polaroid	2018	–	–	–	–		Viaje al Centro del Corazón
"—" denotes a recording that did not chart or was not released in that territory.

Promotional Singles

Title	Year	Peak positions			Album
Title	Year	US Hot Latin Songs	US Latin Pop Airplay	SPA	Album
"Y..."	2003	6	4	2	Cocktail
"Soñar"	2006	2	1	7	Dulce Beat
"Eres Tú"	2006	1	1	1	High School Musical Soundtrack
"Toma Mi Mano"	2007	19	23	12	Fantasía Pop
"Tic-Toc" (featuring Lena Katina)	2011	32	2	12	Sueño Electro II
"Únete Al Movimiento"	2012	5	3	12	Non-album single

Other Charted Songs

Title	Year	Peak positions	Album
Title	Year	MEX	Album
"Sólo Para Mí"	2010	1	Sueño Electro I
"Y Mi Corazón..."	2010	8	Sueño Electro I

== Videography ==
=== DVD releases ===
- Dulce Beat Live 2006 Mexico
- Tour Fantasia Pop Live 2008 Mexico
- Sueño Electro II Deluxe Edition 2011 Mexico

=== Official music videos ===
- "Tus Ojos"

Released in 2003 by Universal Music México
Filmed in Guadalajara, Mexico and directed by Harry.
Watch the video On YouTube

- "Suele Pasar"

Released in 2003 by Universal Music México
Filmed in Toluca, Mexico and directed by Harry.
Watch the video On YouTube

- "Aún Así Te Vas"

Released in 2004 by Universal Music México
Filmed in Mexico City and directed by Studio Monitor.
Watch the video On YouTube

- "Me Pregunto"

Released in 2005 by Universal Music México
Filmed in Mexico City and directed by Ricardo Calderon.
Watch the video On YouTube

- "Por Ti"

Released in 2005 by Universal Music México
Filmed in Mexico City and directed by Oliver Castro.
Watch the video On YouTube

- "Rosa Pastel"

Released in 2006 by Universal Music México
Filmed in Mexico City and directed by Chicle.
Watch the video On YouTube

- "Eres Tú"

Released in 2006 by Walt Disney Records Latino
Filmed in Mexico City.
Watch the video On YouTube

- "Niño"

Released in 2006 by Universal Music México
Filmed in Guadalajara and directed by José Marquez.
Watch the video On YouTube

- "Baila Mi Corazón"

Released in 2007 by Universal Music México
Filmed in Mexico City and directed by Oliver Castro.
Watch the video On YouTube

- "Toma Mi Mano"

Released in 2007 by Universal Music México
Filmed in Mexico City and directed by Pipitol Ibarra.
Watch the video On YouTube

- "Cada Que..."

Released in 2007 by Universal Music México
Filmed in Mexico City and directed by Ángel Flores.
Watch the video On YouTube

- "One, Two, Three, Go! (1, 2, 3, Go!)"

Released in 2008 by Universal Music México
Filmed in Mexico City and directed by Jesús Rodríguez.
Watch the video On YouTube

- "Paso El Tiempo"

Released in 2007 by Universal Music México
Filmed in Mexico City and directed by Ángel Flores.
Watch the video On YouTube

- "Nada De Más"

Released in 2010 by Universal Music México
Filmed in Mexico City and directed by Simon Brand.
Watch the video On YouTube

- "No Me Voy A Morir"

Released in 2010 by Universal Music México
Filmed in Hidalgo, Mexico and directed by Simon Brand.
Watch the video On YouTube

- "Pow Pow"

Released in 2010 by Universal Music México
Filmed in Mexico City and directed by Belanova.
Watch the video On YouTube

- "Mariposas"

Released in 2011 by Universal Music México
Filmed in Mexico City and directed by Daniel Robles Madrigal.
Watch the video On YouTube

- "Tic-Toc (feat. Lena Katina)"

Released in 2011 by Universal Music México
Filmed in Los Angeles and directed by Daniel Robles Madrigal.
Watch the video On YouTube

- "Hasta El Final"

Released in 2011 by Universal Music México
Filmed in Mexico City and directed by Daniel Robles Madrigal.
Watch the video On YouTube

- "Únete Al Movimiento"

Released in 2012 by Universal Music México
Watch the video On YouTube
