= Tour Sueño Electro I =

2010 concert tour by Belanova

- Tour by Belanova
- Associated album: Sueño Electro I
- Start date: October 30, 2010
- End date: December 11, 2010
- No. of shows: 2 in Mexico; 17 in United States; 19 total

Belanova concert chronology
- Tour Fantasía Pop; Tour Sueño Electro I (2011); Tour Sueño Electro II (2012)

The Tour Sueño Electro I was the third musical tour of electropop group Belanova, announcing dates through their Twitter and its official website counted with great dates in the US and many videos that the band shared their personal YouTube account, this tour was in support of their fourth record label production Sueño Electro I and visited several state of Mexico & USA

== Set list ==
1. "Rosa Pastel"
2. "Cada Que..."
3. "Solo Para Mi"
4. "Bye Bye"
5. "Escena Final"
6. "Toma Mi Mano"
7. "Paso El Tiempo"
8. "Y Mi Corazón"
9. "Eres Tú"
10. "No Me Voy a Morir"
11. "Niño"
12. "Tus Ojos"
13. "Me Pregunto"
14. "Tic - Toc"
15. "Por ti"
16. "Baila Mi Corazón"
17. "Nada De Más"
18. "One, Two, Three, Go!"

== Shows ==
Date	City	Country	Venue
October 30, 2010	Silao	Mexico	
November 12, 2010	Tuxtla Gutiérrez	Mexico	
November 18, 2010	Anaheim	United States	House of Blues Anaheim
November 19, 2010	Ventura	United States	Ventura Theater
November 21, 2010	West Hollywood	United States	House of Blues Sunset Strip Hollywood
November 24, 2010	Las Vegas	United States	House of Blues Las Vegas
November 26, 2010	Salt Lake City	United States	
November 27, 2010	Denver	United States	
November 28, 2010	Dallas	United States	Club Río
December 1, 2010	Houston	United States	
December 2, 2010	San Antonio	United States	
December 3, 2010	Laredo	United States	
December 4, 2010	Brownsville	United States	
December 5, 2010	Chicago	United States	House of Blues Chicago
December 7, 2010	San Diego	United States	
December 8, 2010	San Francisco	United States	
December 9, 2010	Sacramento	United States	
December 10, 2010	San Jose	United States	
December 11, 2010	Fresno	Escénicas Ember	
