= Tour Sueño Electro II =

2012 concert tour by Belanova

- Tour by Belanova
- Associated album: Sueño Electro II
- Start date: April 12, 2012
- End date: May 27, 2012
- No. of shows: 11 in April; 3 in May; 2 November; 16 in total

Belanova concert chronology
- Tour Sueño Electro I (2011); Sueño Electro II Tour (2012)

Tour Sueño Electro II was a tour of concerts electropop group Belanova, in support of its fifth studio album, Sueño Electro II (2012), the tour was officially announced on April 3, 2012 in the official YouTube account group, the tour began on April 12 in San Diego 2012 and he ended on May 26, 2012, in El Paso, Neon Desert Music SQ PK Cleveland ending with a total of eleven shows in the span of two months. This tour was only in USA, Belanova added two more dates for what is the closure of Electro Dream were presented on November 14 in the Ruby's Cafe in California with Moderatto and Moenia.

== Set List ==
Tour Sueño Electro II

1. "Mariposas"
2. "Cada Que..."
3. "Chica Robot"
4. "Hasta El Final"
5. "Tus Ojos"
6. "Nada de Más"
7. "Toma Mi Mano"
8. "Paso El Tiempo"
9. "Escena Final"
10. "Bye Bye"
11. "Aun Asi Te Vas"
12. "Me Pregunto"
13. "Tic - Toc"
14. "Baila Mi Corazón"
15. "No Me Voy a Morir"
16. "Niño"
17. "One, Two, Three, Go!"
18. "Rosa Pastel"
19. "Por Ti"

== Critical response ==
Belanova announced via his official Twitter and YouTube channel initially eleven abrian dates for the tour but thanks to the success opened three more, Belanova added two more dates for what is the closure of Sueño Electro Tour were presented on November 14 in the Ruby's Cafe in California with Moderatto and Moenia

== Shows ==
Date	City	Country	Venue
April 12, 2012	San Diego	United States	House of Blues
April 13, 2012	Long Beach	United States	Toyota Grand Prix
April 14, 2012	Ventura	United States	Ventura Theater
April 15, 2012	Las Vegas	United States	Fiesta Rancho
April 18, 2012	Salt Lake City	United States	Club Karamba
April 20, 2012	Milwaukee	United States	The Rave
April 21, 2012	Chicago	United States	Congress Theater
April 22, 2012	Atlanta	United States	Coco Cabana
April 25, 2012	Houston	United States	House of Blues
April 26, 2012	McAllen	United States	Old Ice House
April 27, 2012	Dallas	United States	House of Blues
May 23, 2012	Phoenix	United States	Oceans 7 Nightclub
May 24, 2012	Anaheim	United States	House of Blues
May 26, 2012	El Paso	United States	Neon Desert Music Fest
November 17, 2012	Los Angeles	United States	Gibson Amphitheater
November 18, 2012	San Diego	United States	Electro Rock Fest
