= Canciones Para La Luna - Sinfónico En Vivo =

Live album by Belanova
- Released: 8 October 2013 Digital Download, 13 December 2013 Physical Format
- Recorded: 2 September 2013
- Genre: Latin pop, Symphonic
- Label: Universal Music México

Belanova chronology
Sueño Electro II	Canciones Para La Luna - Sinfónico En Vivo (2013)	Viaje al Centro del Corazón (2018)

Singles from Canciones Para La Luna - Sinfónico En Vivo
- 1. "Solo Dos" Released: October 8, 2013; 2. "Por Ti"; 3. "No Voy a Parar (feat. Jay de La Cueva)" Released: July 7, 2014

Canciones Para La Luna - Sinfónico En Vivo (English: Songs for the Moon - Symphonic Live) is the first album of Belanova in symphonic format where all songs were modified and played with a symphony orchestra, was recorded in the Roberto Cantoral Cultural Center on September 2 and went on sale in digital format through a promotion of Pepsi on October 8 with only 10 songs, up to December 13 Belanova I present in physical format and by a DVD with a total of 15 songs and videos. Several musicians collaborated in this algum: Jay de la Cueva (singer of Moderatto), singers Sofi Mayen y Renee Moi, Javier Blake (singer of División Minúscula), guitarist César “El Vampiro” López (Maná and Jaguares), and Alejandro Rosso (keyboard player from Plastilina Mosh).

== Singles ==
The first single was "Sólo Dos" which was officially launched on October 8, 2013, with his video channel Vevo Belanova, reaching the highest places of popularity in Mexico.

The second single, "Por Ti" being one original song of the album Dulce Beat but with changing rhythms and symphonic orchestra which was a gift for his fans of his early career. To close with the promotion of singles Belanova disk hill with a song duet "No Voy a Parar" the singer Jay de la Cueva of the Moderatto group which was launched officially on July 25, 2014 being the third and final single from the band.

== Track listing ==
No.	Title	Length
1.	"Tus Ojos – En Vivo"	3:45
2.	"Niño – En Vivo"	3:57
3.	"Rosa Pastel – En Vivo"	3:03
4.	"Cada Que... – En Vivo" (featuring (Javier Blake))	4:30
5.	"Juegos De Amor – En Vivo"	3:49
6.	"Escena Final En Vivo"	4:21
7.	"Me Pregunto – En Vivo"	3:51
8.	"No Me Voy a Morir – En Vivo"	4:11
9.	"Y Aun Así Te Vas – En Vivo"	4:21
10.	"Sólo Dos – En Vivo"	3:54
11.	"No Voy a Parar – En Vivo" (featuring Jay de la Cueva)	3:19
12.	"Suele Pasar – En Vivo"	3:32
13.	"Mírame – En Vivo"	3:21
14.	"Por Ti – En Vivo"	4:00
15.	"One, Two, Three, GO! – En Vivo"	3:17

== Certifications ==
Region	Certification	Certified units/sales
Mexico (AMPROFON)	Platinum	60,000^{^}
^{^} Shipments figures based on certification alone.
