= List of top 20 songs for 2008 in Mexico =

This is a list of the General Top 20 songs of 2008 in Mexico according to Monitor Latino. Monitor Latino also issued separate year-end charts for Regional Mexican, Pop and Anglo songs.

№	Title	Artist(s)
1	"Cada que..."	Belanova
2	"Perdóname"	La Factoría ft. Eddy Lover
3	"Gotas de agua dulce"	Juanes
4	"Cinco minutos"	Gloria Trevi
5	"Te quiero"	Nigga
6	"El tiempo de ti"	Playa Limbo
7	"El presente"	Julieta Venegas
8	"No te quiero nada"	Ha*Ash
9	"¿Dónde están, corazón?"	Enrique Iglesias
10	"Para siempre"	Vicente Fernández
11	"One, Two, Three, Go!"	Belanova
12	"Llegaste tú"	Jesse & Joy
13	"Yo quiero"	Camila
14	"10 para las 10"	Playa Limbo
15	"A labio dulce"	Iskander
16	"Inolvidable"	Reik
17	"Si no te hubieras ido"	Maná
18	"Tú, tú, tú"	La Nueva Banda Timbiriche
19	"No se me hace fácil"	Alejandro Fernández
20	"Hasta el final"	Alejandra Guzmán

== See also ==
- List of number-one songs of 2008 (Mexico)
- List of number-one albums of 2008 (Mexico)
