= Dulce Beat Live =

Live album by Belanova
- Released: 1 November 2006
- Recorded: March 2006
- Venue: Foro Expo Guadalajara, Jalisco, Mexico
- Genre: Latin pop, pop, electropop
- Label: Universal
- Producer: Belanova, Tony Peluso, Víctor Dávila, Héctor Zubieta

Belanova chronology
Dulce Beat (2005)	Dulce Beat Live (2006)	Fantasía Pop (2007)

Dulce Beat Live is the first live album from the Mexican electropop band Belanova and third album overall. The album was recorded live from the concert offered in the Foro Expo in Guadalajara, Jalisco, Mexico on March 10, 2006. The album was released on 1 November 2006 in Mexico and 21 November in the United States.

== Overview ==
Dulce Beat Live includes a set of sixteen songs performed live at the Foro Expo in Guadalajara, Jalisco, Mexico on 10 March 2006. The set includes all the eleven tracks from Belanova's second album Dulce Beat, three songs from their debut album Cocktail and two covers, The Cure's "Boys Don't Cry" and Donna Summer's "I Feel Love." Three guest stars are featured on the album and DVD, Coti on "Tus Ojos", Joselo from Café Tacuba "Mirame", "Rosa Pastel" and "Tal Vez" and Brian Amadeus from Moderatto on "Aún Así Te Vas".

== Formats ==
The album has been released through three different formats, digitally with the full audio concert and physically on CD+DVD and DVD-only.

== Reception ==
The album was a success in Mexico where it reached number-eleven on Top 100 Albums Chart, it has sold over 50,000 copies being certified Gold. The DVD reached number-one on the DVD Charts, so far it has been certified Gold, selling over 10,000 copies in Mexico.

== Track listing ==
All tracks by Belanova except where noted.

Dulce Beat Live CD

1. "Intro" – 1:19
2. "Niño" (Ricardo Arreola, Denisse Guerrero, Edgar Huerta, Cachorro López) – 3:42
3. "What a Shame/I Feel Love" (Belanova, Pete Bellotte, Giorgio Moroder, Alex Midi Ortega, Donna Summer) – 6:09
4. "Tus Ojos" featuring Coti (Belanova, Denise Guerrero) – 5:24
5. "Te Quedas o Te Vas" – 3:58
6. "Sexy" – 3:15
7. "Escena Final" – 4:16
8. "Soñar" – 4:57
9. "Mírame" featuring Joselo – 3:22
10. "Tal Vez" featuring Joselo – 3:19
11. "Rosa Pastel" featuring Joselo – 3:43
12. "Por Ti" – 3:48
13. "Boys Don't Cry" (Michael Dempsey, Smith, Robert, Laurence Tolhurst) – 3:44
14. "Y Aún Así Te Vas" featuring Brian Amadeus – 6:14
15. "Me Pregunto" – 4:44
16. "Miedo" – 4:01
17. "Suele Pasar" [Mijangos Extended Mix]/Outro – 6:24

Dulce Beat Live DVD Live from Guadalajara, Jalisco:

1. "Intro" – 1:19
2. "Niño" (Ricardo Arreola, Denisse Guerrero, Edgar Huerta, Cachorro López) – 3:42
3. "What a Shame/I Feel Love" (Belanova, Pete Bellotte, Giorgio Moroder, Alex Midi Ortega, Donna Summer) – 6:09
4. "Tus Ojos" featuring Coti (Belanova, Denise Guerrero) – 5:24
5. "Te Quedas o Te Vas" – 3:58
6. "Sexy" – 3:15
7. "Escena Final" – 4:16
8. "Soñar" – 4:57
9. "Mírame" featuring Joselo – 3:22
10. "Tal Vez" featuring Joselo – 3:19
11. "Rosa Pastel" featuring Joselo – 3:43
12. "Por Ti" – 3:48
13. "Boys Don't Cry" (Michael Dempsey, Smith, Robert, Laurence Tolhurst) – 3:44
14. "Y Aún Así Te Vas" featuring Brian Amadeus – 6:14
15. "Me Pregunto" – 4:44
16. "Miedo" – 4:01
17. "Suele Pasar" [Mijangos Extended Mix]/Outro – 6:24
18. Audio Set-Up
19. Backstage footage and interview with Belanova

== Personnel ==
- Ricardo Arreola – guitar, Bass
- Denisse Guerrero – vocals
- Edgar Huerta – keyboards, programming
