= Federico Fabregat =

Mexican artist and poet (1975–2021)

Federico Fabregat (1975—9 March 2021) was a Mexican visual artist, musician (dJ), filmmaker, and writer. He was born in 1975 in Guadalajara, Jalisco.

== Overview ==
Fabregat was the co-author of the book of poems entitled "SEIS", published by Editorial Agata (2001), which he wrote with five other poets, among them Asdrúbal Eriko Sainz and Daniel Gómez Moreno. He was also a reporter in two of the most important newspapers in the city of Guadalajara (El Informador and Ocho Columnas), working on the art and performances sections and co-publishing the social section. In addition, he was the creative director of the communication enterprise Agencia M along with Insight Marketing. As of May 2006, he was the creative director of Brandcorp, often wrote for media organizations such as Blink, and worked regularly on the Tedium Vitae magazine editorial council.

In addition, he had various artistic musical projects of vanguard, where he had shared the scene with figures such as The Orb and System 7, Nopal Beat Collective among others.

Fabregat maintained other conceptual art projects of the hand of other artists, among them Tomás López Rocha (a plastic artist also living in Guadalajara, Jalisco).

Fabregat also collaborated in the second most important music & art festival in Mexico: Festival Cultural de Mayo (in Guadalajara, Jalisco). In this event, he worked in two projects for the 2007 edition: 1) an alternative festival of electronic and indie music inside Festival Cultural de Mayo, and 2) in the integral programme of innovative strategies to promote this festival. Besides, in this festival edition, he offered a conversation around the contemporary electronic music movement in Guadalajara, in the MAZ (Museo de Arte de Zapopan).

Fabregat was also the author of the book called Oda al Simulacro (Ediciones Arlequin 2008) and Filosofía de Clase Media (also form Ediciones Arlequín 2014).

Fabregat was also a movie director and wrote scripts. His first short film is called "El Torturador" .
