= List of number-one songs of 2008 (Mexico) =

This is a list of the Monitor Latino number-one songs of 2008. Chart rankings are based on airplay across radio states in Mexico using radio tracking data. Charts are ranked from Monday to Sunday. Besides the general chart, Monitor Latino published "Pop", "Regional Mexican" and "Anglo" charts.

== Chart history ==
=== General ===
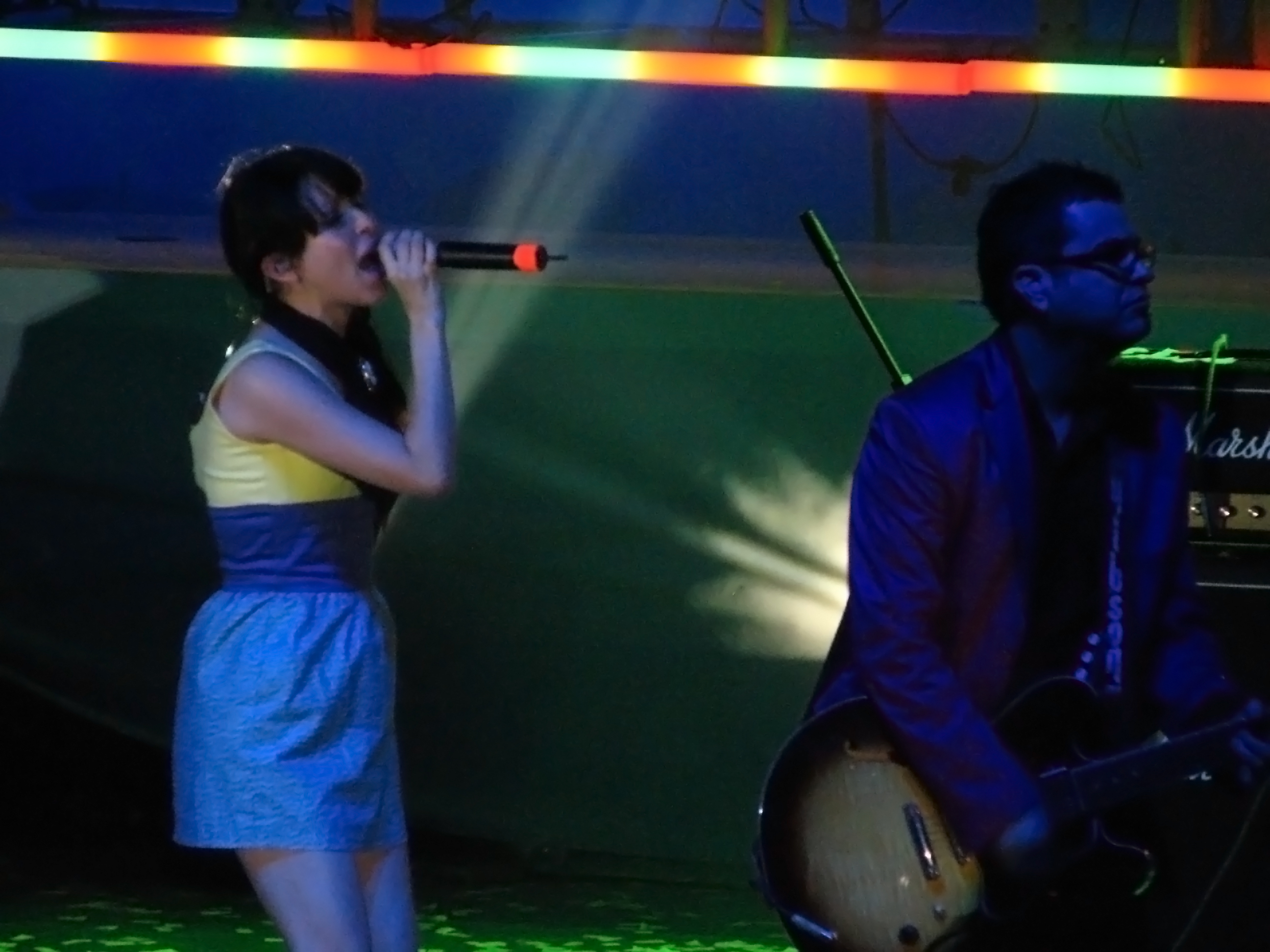
"Cada Que..." by Mexican pop band Belanova (pictured) was the best-performing song of the year.

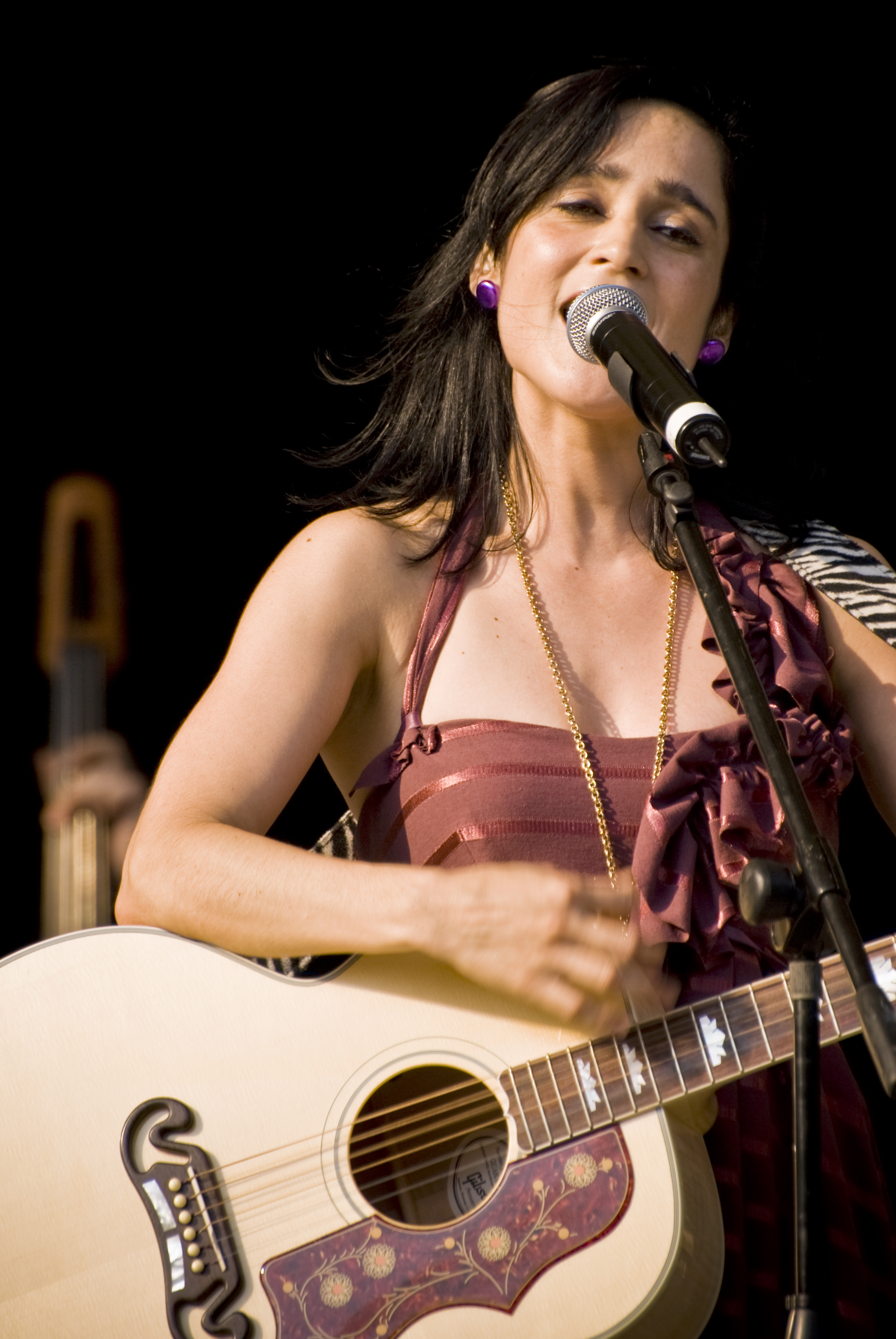
"El presente" by Mexican-American singer-songwriter Julieta Venegas (pictured) topped the General chart for 11 weeks.

In 2008, nine songs reached number one on the General chart; all of these songs were entirely in Spanish. Eight acts achieved their first General number-one song in Mexico: Belanova, Juanes, Julieta Venegas, Ha*Ash, Reik, Luis Fonsi, La Oreja de Van Gogh and Banda El Recodo.

"El presente" by Julieta Venegas was the longest-running General number-one of the year, staying at the top position for eleven consecutive weeks, and "Cada Que..." by Belanova was best-performing song of the year.

The yellow background indicates the best-performing song of 2008.

Issue date	Song	Artist(s)	Ref.
January 6	"Te quiero"	Nigga	
January 13	"Te quiero"	Nigga	
January 20	"Te quiero"	Nigga	
January 27	"Te quiero"	Nigga	
February 3	"Cada Que..."	Belanova	
February 10	"Cada Que..."	Belanova	
February 17	"Cada Que..."	Belanova	
March 2	"Cada Que..."	Belanova	
March 9	"Gotas de Agua Dulce"	Juanes	
March 16	"Cada que..."	Belanova	
March 23	"Cada que..."	Belanova	
March 30	"Gotas de agua dulce"	Juanes	
April 6	"Gotas de agua dulce"	Juanes	
April 20	"Gotas de agua dulce"	Juanes	
April 27	"Gotas de agua dulce"	Juanes	
May 4	"Gotas de agua dulce"	Juanes	
May 11	"Gotas de agua dulce"	Juanes	
May 18	"Gotas de agua dulce"	Juanes	
May 25	"El presente"	Julieta Venegas	
June 1	"El presente"	Julieta Venegas	
June 8	"El presente"	Julieta Venegas	
June 15	"El presente"	Julieta Venegas	
June 22	"El presente"	Julieta Venegas	
June 29	"El presente"	Julieta Venegas	
July 6	"El presente"	Julieta Venegas	
July 13	"El presente"	Julieta Venegas	
July 20	"El presente"	Julieta Venegas	
July 27	"El presente"	Julieta Venegas	
August 3	"El presente"	Julieta Venegas	
August 10	"No te quiero nada"	Ha*Ash	
August 17	"No te quiero nada"	Ha*Ash	
August 24	"No te quiero nada"	Ha*Ash	
August 31	"No te quiero nada"	Ha*Ash	
September 7	"No te quiero nada"	Ha*Ash	
September 14	"No te quiero nada"	Ha*Ash	
September 21	"No te quiero nada"	Ha*Ash	
September 28	"No te quiero nada"	Ha*Ash	
October 5	"No te quiero nada"	Ha*Ash	
October 12	"Inolvidable"	Reik	
October 19	"Inolvidable"	Reik	
October 26	"Inolvidable"	Reik	
November 2	"Inolvidable"	Reik	
November 9	"Inolvidable"	Reik	
November 16	"No Me Doy por Vencido"	Luis Fonsi	
November 30	"El Último Vals"	La Oreja de Van Gogh	
December 7	"Te presumo"	Banda El Recodo	
December 14	"Te presumo"	Banda El Recodo	
December 21	"Te presumo"	Banda El Recodo	
December 28	"Te presumo"	Banda El Recodo	

=== Pop ===
Issue date	Song	Artist(s)	Ref.
January 13	"Me Enamora"	Juanes	
January 20	"No se me hace fácil"	Alejandro Fernández	
January 27	"Cada Que..."	Belanova	
February 3	"Cada Que..."	Belanova	
February 10	"Cada Que..."	Belanova	
February 17	"Cada Que..."	Belanova	
March 2	"Cada Que..."	Belanova	
March 9	"Gotas de Agua Dulce"	Juanes	
March 16	"Cada que..."	Belanova	
March 23	"Cada que..."	Belanova	
March 30	"Gotas de agua dulce"	Juanes	
April 6	"Gotas de agua dulce"	Juanes	
April 20	"Gotas de agua dulce"	Juanes	
April 27	"Gotas de agua dulce"	Juanes	
May 4	"Gotas de agua dulce"	Juanes	
May 11	"Gotas de agua dulce"	Juanes	
May 18	"El presente"	Julieta Venegas	
May 25	"El presente"	Julieta Venegas	
July 20	"El presente"	Julieta Venegas	
August 3	"El presente"	Julieta Venegas	
September 7	"No te quiero nada"	Ha*Ash	
September 28	"No te quiero nada"	Ha*Ash	
October 5	"No te quiero nada"	Ha*Ash	
October 12	"Inolvidable"	Reik	
October 19	"Inolvidable"	Reik	
October 26	"Inolvidable"	Reik	
November 2	"Inolvidable"	Reik	
November 9	"Inolvidable"	Reik	
November 16	"No Me Doy por Vencido"	Luis Fonsi	
November 30	"El Último Vals"	La Oreja de Van Gogh	
December 7	"Lo que yo sé de ti"	Ha*Ash	
December 14	"Lo que yo sé de ti"	Ha*Ash	
December 21	"Lo que yo sé de ti"	Ha*Ash	
December 28	"Se te olvidó"	Kalimba	

=== Regional ===
Issue date	Song	Artist(s)	Ref.
January 13	"Sobre mis pies"	La Arrolladora Banda El Limón	
January 20	"Sobre mis pies"	La Arrolladora Banda El Limón	
January 27	"Sobre mis pies"	La Arrolladora Banda El Limón	
February 3	"Sobre mis pies"	La Arrolladora Banda El Limón	
February 10	"Sobre mis pies"	La Arrolladora Banda El Limón	
February 17	"Tómame o déjame"	Banda el Recodo	
March 2	"Tómame o déjame"	Banda el Recodo	
March 9	"Tómame o déjame"	Banda el Recodo	
March 16	"Tómame o déjame"	Banda el Recodo	
March 23	"Tómame o déjame"	Banda el Recodo	
March 30	"Tómame o déjame"	Banda el Recodo	
April 6	"Tómame o déjame"	Banda el Recodo	
April 20	"Tómame o déjame"	Banda el Recodo	
April 27	"Para siempre"	Vicente Fernández	
May 4	"Para siempre"	Vicente Fernández	
May 11	"Primer tiempo"	La Arrolladora Banda El Limón	
May 18	"Primer tiempo"	La Arrolladora Banda El Limón	
May 25	"Primer tiempo"	La Arrolladora Banda El Limón	
July 20	"No hay novedad"	Banda el Recodo	
August 3	"No hay novedad"	Banda el Recodo	
August 31	"Y que quede claro"	La Arrolladora Banda El Limón	
September 7	"Y que quede claro"	La Arrolladora Banda El Limón	
September 14	"Y que quede claro"	La Arrolladora Banda El Limón	
September 28	"Y que quede claro"	La Arrolladora Banda El Limón	
October 5	"Dame tu amor"	Alacranes Musical	
October 12	"Dame tu amor"	Alacranes Musical	
October 19	"Dame tu amor"	Alacranes Musical	
November 2	"Dame tu amor"	Alacranes Musical	
November 16	"Te presumo"	Banda el Recodo	
November 30	"Te presumo"	Banda el Recodo	
December 7	"Te presumo"	Banda el Recodo	
December 14	"Te presumo"	Banda el Recodo	
December 21	"Te presumo"	Banda el Recodo	
December 28	"Te presumo"	Banda el Recodo	

=== English ===
Issue date	Song	Artist(s)	Ref.
January 13	"Gimme More"	Britney Spears	
January 20	"Pictures of You"	The Last Goodnight	
January 27	"Hot"	Avril Lavigne	
February 3	"Pictures of You"	The Last Goodnight	
February 10	"Don't Stop the Music"	Rihanna	
February 17	"Don't Stop the Music"	Rihanna	
March 2	"When I'm Gone"	Simple Plan	
March 9	"When I'm Gone"	Simple Plan	
March 16	"When I'm Gone"	Simple Plan	
March 23	"When I'm Gone"	Simple Plan	
March 30	"When I'm Gone"	Simple Plan	
April 6	"Bubbly"	Colbie Caillat	
April 20	"4 Minutes To Save The World"	Madonna ft. Justin Timberlake	
April 27	"4 Minutes To Save The World"	Madonna ft. Justin Timberlake	
May 4	"4 Minutes To Save The World"	Madonna ft. Justin Timberlake	
May 11	"4 Minutes To Save The World"	Madonna ft. Justin Timberlake	
May 18	"4 Minutes To Save The World"	Madonna ft. Justin Timberlake	
May 25	"4 Minutes To Save The World"	Madonna ft. Justin Timberlake	
July 20	"Bubbly"	Colbie Caillat	
July 27	"Love Song"	Sara Bareilles	
August 3	"Viva la Vida"	Coldplay	
August 31	"Viva la Vida"	Coldplay	
September 7	"Viva la Vida"	Coldplay	
September 14	"Viva la Vida"	Coldplay	
September 21	"Viva la Vida"	Coldplay	
September 28	"Viva la Vida"	Coldplay	
October 5	"Viva la Vida"	Coldplay	
October 12	"Viva la Vida"	Coldplay	
October 19	"Viva la Vida"	Coldplay	
October 26	"Viva la Vida"	Coldplay	
November 2	"Viva la Vida"	Coldplay	
November 9	"Shut Up and Let Me Go"	The Ting Tings	
November 16	"Shut Up and Let Me Go"	The Ting Tings	
November 30	"So What"	Pink	
December 7	"So What"	Pink	
December 14	"Hot n Cold"	Katy Perry	
December 21	"Hot n Cold"	Katy Perry	
December 28	"Hot n Cold"	Katy Perry	

== See also ==
- List of Top 20 songs for 2008 in Mexico
- List of number-one albums of 2008 (Mexico)
