= Algún Día =

Single by Julieta Venegas featuring Gustavo Santaolalla

from the album MTV Unplugged
- Language: Spanish
- Released: September 10, 2008
- Recorded: 2008
- Length: 4:00
- Label: Sony BMG
- Songwriter: Julieta Venegas
- Producer: Julieta Venegas

Julieta Venegas featuring Gustavo Santaolalla singles chronology
"El Presente" (2008)	"Algún Día" (2008)	"Bajo Otra Luz" (2009)

"Algún Día" (English: "Someday") is a song by Mexican singer-songwriter Julieta Venegas released as the second single from her album MTV Unplugged in 2008. Released on September 10, 2008, in Mexico and several Latin American countries.

== Song information ==
The song was written and performed by Julieta Venegas herself on the MTV Unplugged, in collaboration with Gustavo Santaolalla playing the banjo and singing.

== Tracking list ==
CD Single

1. "Algún Día" featuring Gustavo Santaolalla — 4:00

== Charts ==
=== Weekly charts ===
Chart performance for "Algún Día"
Chart (2008–2009)	Peak position
Costa Rica (EFE)	9
Mexico (Monitor Latino)	1
Mexico (Billboard Espanol Airplay)	42
