= Sueño Electro II =

- Digital and vinyl standard edition artwork

Studio album by Belanova
- Released: 6 September 2011
- Recorded: Mexico
- Genre: Pop
- Producer: Armando Ávila & Belanova

Belanova chronology
Sueño Electro I (2010)	Sueño Electro II (2011)	Canciones Para La Luna - Sinfónico En Vivo (2014)

Alternative cover
- Physical CD/DVD deluxe edition cover

Singles from Sueño Electro II
- 1. "Mariposas" Released: 10 May 2011; 2. "Hasta El Final" Released: 27 September 2011

Sueño Electro II (Electro Dream ll) is the fifth studio album from the Mexican Pop band Belanova, and is the second half of the Sueño Electro project. The album was recorded simultaneously with the fourth album, Sueño Electro I, and features a similar musical style and continued experimentation, this time with Ranchera and country-inspired music. The band had confirmed that it would be released on August 30, 2011, but it was later delayed until September 6 for simultaneous release in Mexico, USA, and Latin America. At the time of its release, the album was physically released in Mexico and in the United States, the deluxe edition was released physically while the standard edition was released digitally. In 2024, the album was reissued on vinyl alongside the band's previous albums.

== Reception ==
Sueño Electro II debuted at number 8 on the Billboard Latin Pop Charts, number 15 on the Billboard Latin Albums Chart, and number 12 on the Billboard Dance/Electronic Albums Chart. In Mexico, it debuted at number 20 on the AMPROFON Top 100 Chart, and number 12 on the AMPROFON Spanish Genre Chart.

== Track listing ==
The track list was announced by Belanova on their official Facebook page on July 26, 2011.

No.	Title	Length
1.	"Mariposas" ("Butterflies")	3:47
2.	"Flash Eléctrico" ("Electric Flash")	3:31
3.	"Todo Mi Amor" ("All My Love")	3:37
4.	"Hasta El Final" ("Until the End")	3:50
5.	"Infame" ("Infamous")	3:37
6.	"Luna" ("Moon")	3:36
7.	"Aquí" ("Here")	3:50
8.	"Dulce Amor^{1}" ("Sweet Love")	3:14
9.	"Tic-Toc^{2}" (featuring Lena Katina)	4:14
10.	"Mariposas" (Sussie 4 Remix)	3:57
11.	"Mariposas" (Capri Remix)	4:13

^1 "Dulce Amor" is a cover of the song by Ana Martín.
^2 "Tic-Toc" appeared on the previous album; the version on this album is a duet version.

Deluxe Edition Bonus DVD

1. "Nada De Más"
2. "No Me Voy a Morir"
3. "Rosa Pastel (Live @ Acceso Total)"
4. "Nada De Más (Live @ Acceso Total)"
5. "Baila Mi Corazón (Live @ Acceso Total)"
6. "No Me Voy a Morir (Live @ Acceso Total)"
7. "Y Mi Corazón... (Live @ Acceso Total)"
8. "Por Ti (Live @ Acceso Total)"
9. "Interview with Belanova"

== Promotion ==
Belanova began his fourth tour used to promote disco Sueño electro II with a total of 14 tour dates appointed Tour Sueño Electro II

== Singles and other songs ==
- The first single released was "Mariposas", which was released on May 10, 2011 after only two singles from the previous album, Sueño Electro I. Daniel Robles directed the music video.
- "Hasta El Final" was released as the second single from the album on September 27, 2011. The song combines traditional Mexican Mariachi music with elements of synthpop. A video was filmed in Guadalajara on September 18, 2011, directed by Daniel Robles.
- Russian singer Lena Katina of t.A.T.u. is featured on this album's version of "Tic-Toc", which was originally from the previous album. On August 12, 2011, the song was given as a free download on the band's official website. A video for the song was filmed in Los Angeles.
- "Todo Mi Amor" was reported to have been chosen as the first single, after a video for the song was filmed at the Monterrey Institute of Technology and Higher Education. However, "Mariposas" was released instead, and "Todo Mi Amor" was leaked online a few days later.
