= Sussie 4 =

Mexican electronic music duo

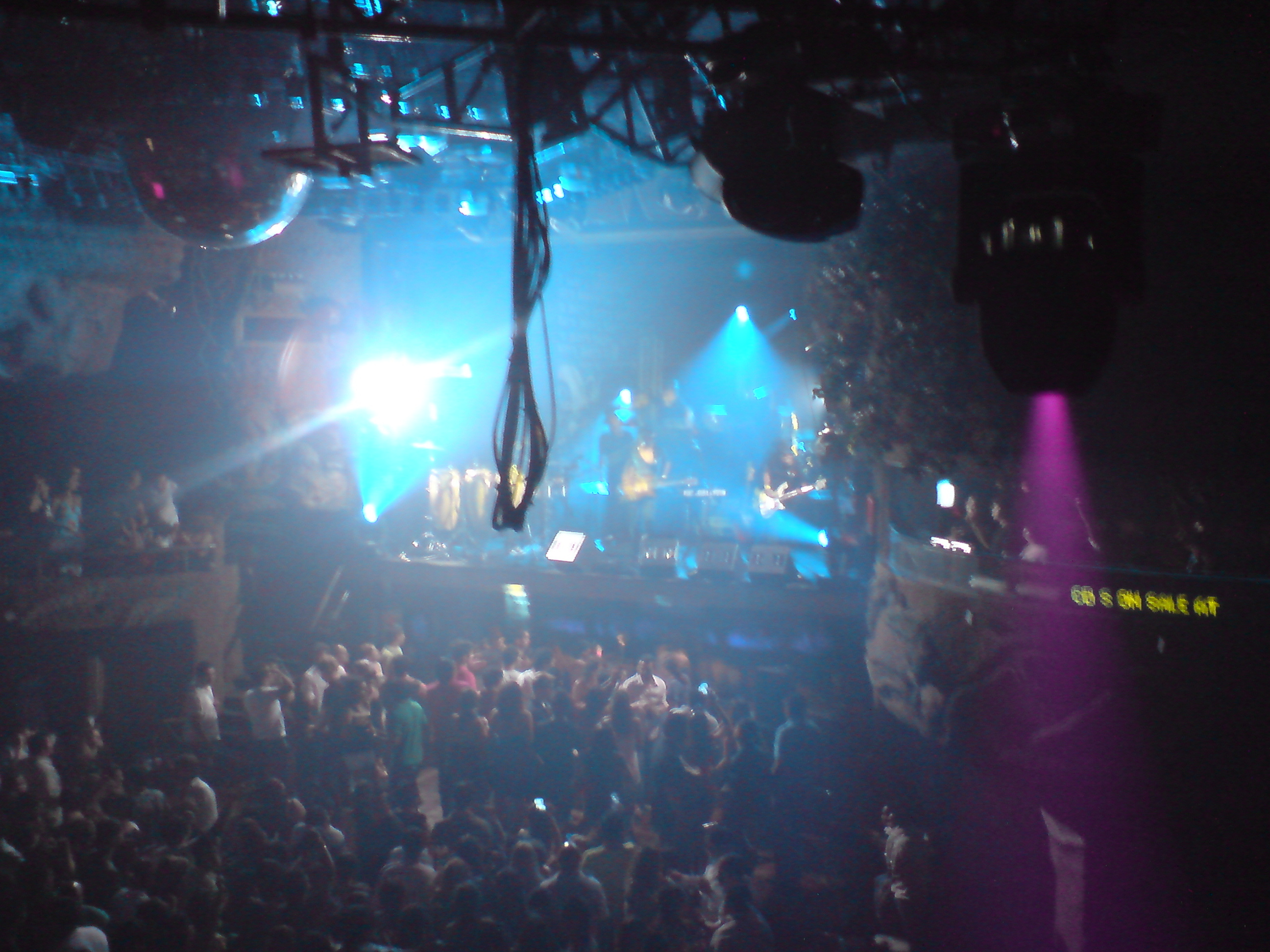
- Sussie 4 in a presentation at a club in Cancun, Mexico.

Background information
- Origin: Guadalajara, Jalisco, Mexico
- Genres: Acid cabaret, house, electronic
- Years active: 1998–present
- Label: EMI Music
- Members: César Gudiño; Odín Parada

Sussie 4 is an electronic music duo from Guadalajara, Mexico, formed in 1998. The band is part of the electronic music scene, mainly in the style of house music. The name comes from the musician and actress Suzi Quatro (4 in Spanish being "cuatro").

== History ==
Sussie 4 was formed in the summer of 1998 in Guadalajara, Mexico, by music producer César Gudiño (keyboards, synths, program systems) and instrumentalist Odín Parada (guitar, percussion, voice). They began experimenting with a fusion of organic and electronic music. With strong influences in French house, their sound mixes Latin rhythms with jazz and pop in avant-garde ways.

The term which best defines their sound is the one that gives title to their debut album, Música Moderna (modern music), released in 2002 by Nopal Beat/EMI. Music from this album was featured in a number of popular compilations of electronic music and helped the band become known in the electronic music scene throughout Australia, Japan, Germany, Spain, Portugal, Brazil, and other countries worldwide.

In all four of their studio albums, Sussie 4 have collaborated with various well-known Latin singers and artists, such as Denisse Guerrero of Belanova, Ale Sergi of Miranda!, León Larregui of Zoé, Valentina González, and Ely Guerra.

== Studio albums ==
- Música Moderna (2002)
- Red Album (2006)
- International Sonora (2009)
- Radiolatina (2012)

== Tours ==
The band has toured with Gus Gus, Bentley Rhythm Ace, Sven Väth, Deep Dish, DJ Hell, and Buscemi. They have participated in collaborative presentations at festivals such as Techno Geist, Vive Latino Union Fest y Playa MTV in Mexico, Rock al Parque in Colombia, and Espárragos in Spain.
