= List of number-one albums of 2008 (Mexico) =

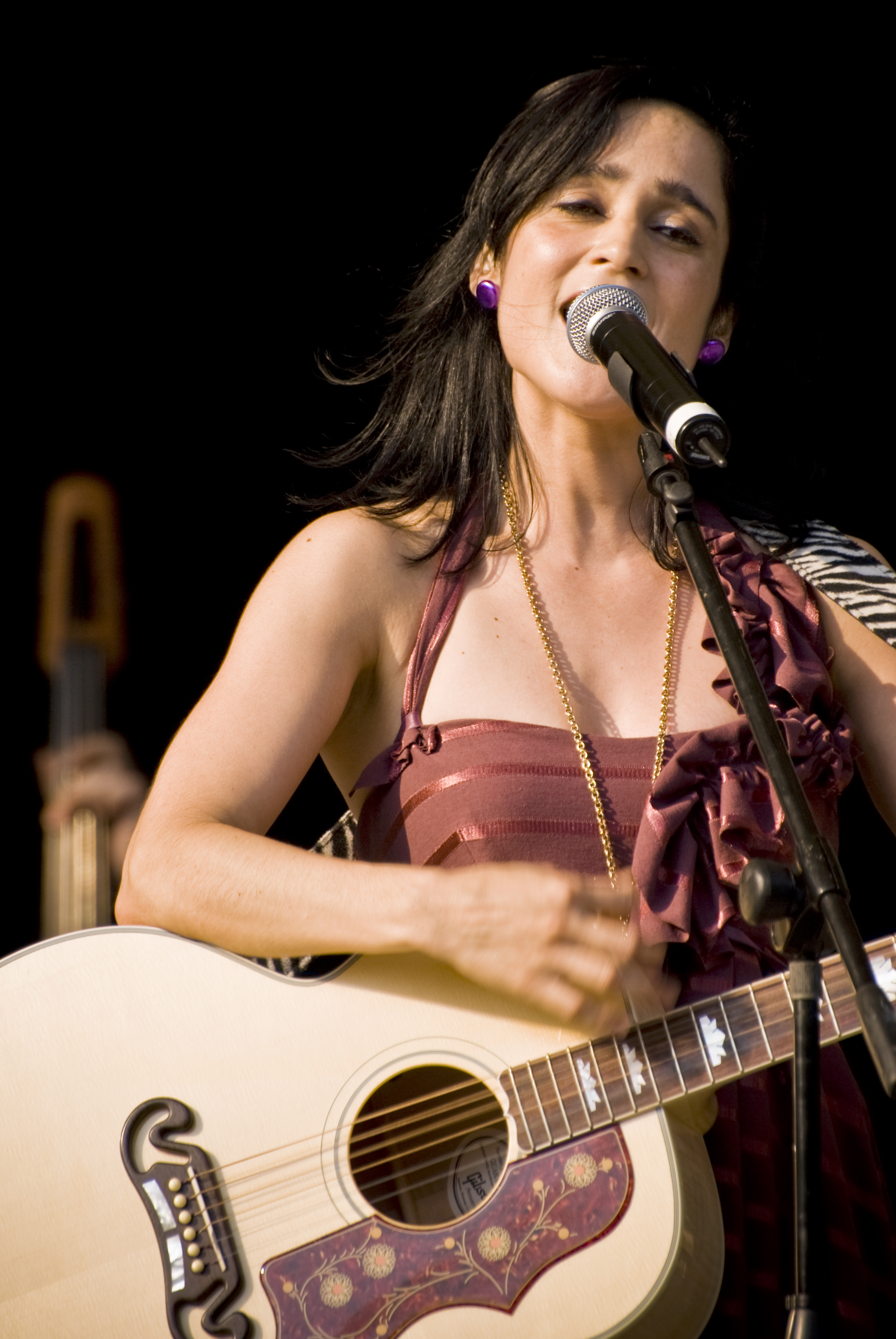
Mexican singer-songwriter Julieta Venegas peaked at number-one with her live album MTV Unplugged in 2008.

The highest-selling compact discs and music downloads in Mexico are ranked in the Top 100 Mexico record chart published weekly by AMPROFON (Asociación Mexicana de Productores de Fonogramas y Videogramas), a non-profit organization made up of Mexican and multinational record companies.

In 2008, 11 albums reached number-one in the chart, including Para Siempre, the 79th studio album by Vicente Fernández, spent 14 non-consecutive weeks at the top and was certified Diamond in México. The album also won the Latin Grammy Award for Best Ranchero Album in the 2008 ceremony, became the best-selling album of the year in México, and hit the top of the chart in the Billboard Top Latin Albums chart in the United States, where it was the second best-selling Latin album of the year.

Luis Miguel peaked at number-one with Cómplices, an album written and produced by Spanish lyricist Manuel Alejandro. The album received a nomination for the Grammy Award for Best Latin Pop Album. Another top album was Julieta Venegas' MTV Unplugged, a seventy-five-minute performance in Mexico City broadcast simultaneously in Mexico, Spain and the United States on June 5, 2008. Death Magnetic by Metallica and A Little Bit Longer by Jonas Brothers reached the top of the chart and also peaked at number-one in the Billboard 200 in the United States. Alejandro Fernández released two number-one albums in 2008: 15 Años de Éxitos and De Noche: Clásicos a Mi Manera; while Spanish singer-songwriter also hit twice the top of the chart, the first as the lead voice of Héroes del Silencio and as a solo artist with Hellville de luxe.

== Albums ==
The yellow background indicates the best-performing album of 2008.

Chart date	Album	Artist	Reference
January 7	15 Años de Éxitos	Alejandro Fernández	
January 14	15 Años de Éxitos	Alejandro Fernández	
January 21	Tour 2007	Héroes del Silencio	
January 28	Tour 2007	Héroes del Silencio	
February 4	Para Siempre	Vicente Fernández	
February 11	Para Siempre	Vicente Fernández	
February 18	Para Siempre	Vicente Fernández	
February 25	Para Siempre	Vicente Fernández	
March 2	Para Siempre	Vicente Fernández	
March 9	Para Siempre	Vicente Fernández	
March 16	Para Siempre	Vicente Fernández	
March 23	Para Siempre	Vicente Fernández	
March 30	Para Siempre	Vicente Fernández	
April 7	Para Siempre	Vicente Fernández	
April 14	Para Siempre	Vicente Fernández	
April 21	Para Siempre	Vicente Fernández	
April 28	Para Siempre	Vicente Fernández	
May 5	Cómplices	Luis Miguel	
May 12	Cómplices	Luis Miguel	
May 19	Cómplices	Luis Miguel	
May 26	Cómplices	Luis Miguel	
June 2	Cómplices	Luis Miguel	
June 9	Cómplices	Luis Miguel	
June 16	Para Siempre	Vicente Fernández	
June 23	MTV Unplugged	Julieta Venegas	
June 30	MTV Unplugged	Julieta Venegas	
July 7	MTV Unplugged	Julieta Venegas	
July 14	MTV Unplugged	Julieta Venegas	
July 21	MTV Unplugged	Julieta Venegas	
July 28	MTV Unplugged	Julieta Venegas	
August 4	MTV Unplugged	Julieta Venegas	
August 11	MTV Unplugged	Julieta Venegas	
August 18	MTV Unplugged	Julieta Venegas	
August 25	MTV Unplugged	Julieta Venegas	
September 1	A Little Bit Longer	Jonas Brothers	
September 8	A Little Bit Longer	Jonas Brothers	
September 15	Death Magnetic	Metallica	
September 22	Death Magnetic	Metallica	
September 29	Death Magnetic	Metallica	
October 6	Death Magnetic	Metallica	
October 13	Death Magnetic	Metallica	
October 20	Hellville de Luxe	Bunbury	
October 27	Perfect Symmetry	Keane	
November 3	High School Musical 3: Senior Year	Various artists	
November 10	High School Musical 3: Senior Year	Various artists	
November 17	De Noche: Clásicos a Mi Manera	Alejandro Fernández	
November 24	5to Piso	Ricardo Arjona	
December 1	De Noche: Clásicos a Mi Manera	Alejandro Fernández	
December 8	De Noche: Clásicos a Mi Manera	Alejandro Fernández	
December 15	De Noche: Clásicos a Mi Manera	Alejandro Fernández	
December 22	De Noche: Clásicos a Mi Manera	Alejandro Fernández	
December 29	De Noche: Clásicos a Mi Manera	Alejandro Fernández	

== See also ==
- List of number-one songs of 2008 (Mexico)
