= El presente =

"El Presente"

Single by Julieta Venegas

from the album MTV Unplugged
- Language: Spanish
- Released: 15 April 2008
- Recorded: 2008
- Length: 3:41
- Label: Sony BMG
- Songwriter: Julieta Venegas
- Producer: Julieta Venegas

Julieta Venegas singles chronology
"Mi principio" (2008)	"El Presente" (2008)	"Algún Día" (2008)

Music video
- "El Presente" on YouTube

"El presente" (English: "The Present") is a song by Julieta Venegas and is the first single from her album MTV Unplugged Julieta Venegas. Released on April 15, 2008. It is categorized as "A Worldwide Hit". The next song was placed in the top of Mexican radio, and Latin America and spent 11 weeks in the first place. The song was nominated for the Latin Grammy Award for Record of the Year and Song of the Year in 2008.

== Song information ==
It was written by Julieta Venegas for her MTV Unplugged. "The song is about having only this time with a bit of nostalgia because it is short time, but at the same time enjoying it with someone who makes it worthwhile ... it is both sad and happy" Julieta said this in her Myspace page.

== Live performances ==
The singer has taken her hit to several parts of the world. Apart from the acoustic presentation of her tour of the same name (El Presente Tour) include: at Los Premios MTV Latinoamérica 2008 in Guadalajara, Mexico with the collaboration of the group Nortec Collective in a version Electro/ranchera and Mariachi music typical of that state.

At the Latin Grammy Awards in Houston, Texas, after a presentation of various accordions in Latin music that touched it with her song.

In the Nobel Prize in 2008 in Oslo, Norway with American actress Scarlett Johansson and British actor Michael Caineas, well as performing "Algún Día". “It's an occasion to celebrate the good aspects of human beings, the former Finnish president helped negotiate peace in some conflicts in the world, is a very important to me is very exciting to participate” Julieta express. Being a very important presentation by the artist.

== Track listing ==
CD Single

1. "El Presente (Unplugged)" — 3:41

== Charts ==
=== Weekly charts ===
Chart performance for "El Presente"
Chart (2008)	Peak position
Mexico (Monitor Latino)	1
Spain (PROMUSICAE)	3
US Hot Latin Songs (Billboard)	11
US Latin Pop Airplay (Billboard)	2
Venezuela (Record Report)	1

=== Year-end charts ===
Chart (2008)	Position
Mexico (Monitor Latino)	7
US Latin Pop Airplay (Billboard)	20

== Awards and nominations ==
Latin Grammy

Year	Title	Result
2008
2008	Record of the Year	Nominated
2008	Song of the Year	Nominated

Latin Billboard Awards

Year	Title	Result
2009
2009	Song of The Year, Female	Nominated
2009	Latin Song of The Year, Female	Nominated

== See also ==
- List of number-one songs of 2008 (Mexico)
