= High School Musical (soundtrack) =

2006 soundtrack album

Soundtrack album by High School Musical Cast
- Released: January 10, 2006
- Recorded: Summer 2005
- Genre: Pop
- Length: 38:31
- Label: Walt Disney
- Producers: Kenny Ortega, Bill Borden, Barry Rosenbush, Drew Lane, Eddie Galan,

High School Musical chronology
High School Musical (2006)	High School Musical 2 (2007)

Singles from High School Musical
- 1. "Breaking Free" Released: June 8, 2006; 2. "Get'cha Head in the Game" Released: July 17, 2006; 3. "We're All in This Together" Released: October 16, 2006

Professional ratings
Review scores
Source	Rating
AllMusic	3/5 stars

High School Musical is the soundtrack of the Disney Channel Original Movie of the same name. Recorded in five days, it was released on January 10, 2006, and became the best selling album of that year, having sold more than 3.7 million copies in the US and 7 million copies worldwide. As of January 2016, the album has sold 5 million copies in the US, making it the best-selling TV soundtrack since 1991 when Nielsen SoundScan started tracking music sales.

== Track listing ==
No.	Title	Writer(s)	Performer(s)	Length
1.	"Start of Something New"	Matthew Gerrard; Robbie Nevil	Zac Efron, (Note: Although Zac Efron portrayed Troy Bolton in the movie, Drew Seeley's recordings were used for Troy's singing vocals for the majority of the film and soundtrack. Efron sings the beginning portions of "Start of Something New" and "Breaking Free". Seeley was originally uncredited for his vocals on the soundtrack.) Vanessa Hudgens	3:17
2.	"Get'cha Head in the Game"	Ray Cham; Greg Cham; Drew Seeley	Zac Efron	2:26
3.	"What I've Been Looking For"	Andy Dodd; Adam Watts	Ashley Tisdale, Lucas Grabeel	2:04
4.	"What I've Been Looking For (Reprise)"	Andy Dodd; Adam Watts	Zac Efron, Vanessa Hudgens	1:20
5.	"Stick to the Status Quo"	David Lawrence; Faye Greenberg	Ashley Tisdale, Lucas Grabeel, Chris Warren Jr., Kaycee Stroh, Dutch Whitlock	4:28
6.	"When There Was Me and You"	Jamie Houston	Vanessa Hudgens	3:00
7.	"Bop to the Top"	Randy Petersen; Kevin Quinn	Ashley Tisdale, Lucas Grabeel	1:47
8.	"Breaking Free"	Jamie Houston	Zac Efron, Vanessa Hudgens,	3:27
9.	"We're All in This Together"	Matthew Gerrard; Robbie Nevil (Note: Although Zac Efron portrayed Troy Bolton in the movie, Drew Seeley's recordings were used for Troy's singing vocals for the majority of the film and soundtrack. Efron sings the beginning portions of "Start of Something New" and "Breaking Free". Seeley was originally uncredited for his vocals on the soundtrack.) (Note: The instrumentals of "Start of Something New" and "Breaking Free" appear on the second disc of the special edition, and are thus removed from the first disc. Neither track appears on the 2018 LP pressing.)	Zac Efron, Vanessa Hudgens, Ashley Tisdale, Lucas Grabeel, Corbin Bleu, Monique Coleman	3:51

=== High School Musical Hits Remixed ===
High School Musical Hits Remixed

Remix album by High School Musical Cast
- Released: December 11, 2007
- Genre: Dance
- Length: 24:40
- Label: Walt Disney

High School Musical chronology
High School Musical 2 (2007)	High School Musical Hits Remixed (2007)	High School Musical 2: Non-Stop Dance Party (2007)

High School Musical Hits Remixed was released exclusively to Walmart on December 11, 2007, and features remixes of various songs from the soundtracks to both High School Musical and High School Musical 2.

1. "Bet on It" (Remix)
2. "Fabulous" (Remix)
3. "Breaking Free" (Remix)
4. "Bop to the Top" (Remix)
5. "I Don't Dance" (Remix)
6. "I Can't Take My Eyes Off of You" (Remix)
7. "Humuhumunukunukuapua'a" (Remix)
8. "We're All in This Together" (Remix)

== Chart positions ==
=== Weekly charts ===
Chart (2006–2008)	Peak position
Argentinian Albums (CAPIF)	1
Australian Albums (ARIA)	1
Austrian Albums (Ö3 Austria)	13
Belgian Albums (Ultratop Wallonia)	55
Brazilian Albums (Sucesso)	1
Canadian Albums (Nielsen SoundScan)	23
Danish Albums (Hitlisten)	12
Dutch Albums (Album Top 100)	11
French Albums (SNEP)	6
German Albums (Offizielle Top 100)	22
Hungarian Albums (MAHASZ)	6
Italian Compilation Albums (FIMI)	1
Malaysian International Albums (RIM)	1
Mexican Albums (AMPROFON)	1
New Zealand Albums (RMNZ)	1
Norwegian Albums (VG-lista)	6
Polish Albums (ZPAV)	49
Spanish Albums (Promusicae)	6
Swiss Albums (Schweizer Hitparade)	63
UK Compilation Albums (Official Charts)	1
UK Soundtrack Albums (Official Charts)	1
US Billboard 200	1
US Digital Albums (Billboard)	17
US Top Catalog Albums (Billboard)	8
US Soundtrack Albums (Billboard)	1
Venezuelan Albums (IFPI)	1

=== Monthly charts ===
Chart (2007–2008)	Peak position
Uruguayan Albums (CUD)	3

=== Year-end charts ===
Chart (2006)	Position
Australian Albums (ARIA)	27
Austrian Albums (Ö3 Austria)	121
French Albums (SNEP)	82
German Albums (Offizielle Top 100)	182
Mexican Albums (AMPROFON)	8
Norwegian Albums (VG-lista)	55
US Billboard 200	2
US Digital Albums (Billboard)	10
US Kid Albums (Billboard)	1
US Soundtracks Albums (Billboard)	1

Chart (2007)	Position
Austrian Albums (Ö3 Austria)	37
Danish Albums (Hitlisten)	49
German Albums (Offizielle Top 100)	44
Mexican Albums (AMPROFON)	31
US Billboard 200	37
US Kid Albums (Billboard)	4
US Soundtracks Albums (Billboard)	4

Chart (2008)	Position
US Billboard 200	113
US Soundtracks Albums (Billboard)	9

== Certifications and sales ==
Certifications and sales for High School Musical
Region	Certification	Certified units/sales
Argentina (CAPIF)	4× Platinum	160,000^{^}
Australia (ARIA)	2× Platinum	140,000^{^}
Austria (IFPI Austria)	Platinum	30,000^{*}
Brazil (Pro-Música Brasil)	2× Platinum	156,000
Canada (Music Canada)	Platinum	100,000^{^}
Chile	—	34,000
Colombia	2× Platinum	
Denmark (IFPI Danmark)	2× Platinum	40,000^{‡}
Ecuador	Gold	5,000
France (SNEP)	Gold	75,000^{*}
Germany (BVMI)	Platinum	200,000^{^}
Hungary (MAHASZ)	Gold	5,000^{^}
Ireland (IRMA)	4× Platinum	60,000^{^}
Italy (FIMI)	Gold	115,000
Malaysia	Platinum	
Mexico (AMPROFON)	2× Platinum+Gold	250,000^{^}
New Zealand (RMNZ)	3× Platinum	45,000^{^}
Norway	—	25,000
Philippines (PARI)	3× Platinum	
Poland (ZPAV)	Gold	10,000^{*}
Portugal (AFP)	Platinum	20,000^{^}
Singapore (RIAS)	Platinum	12,000^{*}
Spain (Promusicae)	2× Platinum	160,000^{^}
United Kingdom (BPI)	4× Platinum	1,200,000^{^}
United States (RIAA)	5× Platinum	5,000,000
Summaries
Europe (IFPI)	Platinum	1,000,000^{*}
Latin America	—	800,000
^{*} Sales figures based on certification alone.^{^} Shipments figures based on certification alone.^{‡} Sales+streaming figures based on certification alone.

== International versions ==
The album has been rerecorded and released in international versions with foreign language lyrics in some countries.

Song	Original name	Language	Singer(s)	Country
"High School Musical"	"High School Musical"	Spanish	Mota	Spain
"High School Musical"	"High School Musical"	Spanish	Reparto de "High School Musical: El Desafío"	Mexico
"Классный мюзикл" (Klassny Myuzikl)	"High School Musical"	Russian	Sergey Lazarev, Kseniya Larina, Mikhail Veselov, Evgeniya Otradnaya & Others	Russia
"High School Musical"	"High School Musical"	Hindi	Naresh Kamath, Sunidhi Chauhan, Neuman Pinto, Shweta Pandit, Samantha Edwards, Suzanne D'Mello & Dean D'Souza	India

International versions have also been released for individual singles.

Song	Original name	Language	Singer(s)
"Наверх в облака" (Naverkh v oblaka)	"Start of Something New"	Russian	Sergey Lazarev & Kseniya Larina
"Algo Va A Empezar"	"Start of Something New"	Spanish (Mexico)	Gerardo & Mariana (High School Musical: La Selección)
"Ты владеешь мячом" (Ty vladeyesh' myachom)	"Get'cha Head in the Game"	Russian	Sergey Lazarev
"Pon la mente en el juego"	"Get'cha Head in the Game"	Spanish (Argentina)	Fernando Dente (High School Musical: La Selección)
"Mente en el Juego"	"Get'cha Head in the Game"	Spanish (Mexico)	Cistobal & Cesar (High School Musical: La Selección)
"Мы в темные дни грустили одни" (My v temnye dni grustiili odni)	"What I've Been Looking For"	Russian	Sergey Lazarev & Kseniya Larina
"Eres Tú"	"What I've Been Looking For"	Spanish (Mexico)	Belanova
"O Que Eu Procurava"	"What I've Been Looking For"	Portuguese (Brazil)	Ludov
"O Que Eu Procurava"	"What I've Been Looking For"	Portuguese (Brazil)	Fellipe Guadanucci & Paula Barbosa (High School Musical: A Seleção)
"Estando tú y yo"	"When There Was Me and You"	Spanish (Mexico)	Fabiola (High School Musical: La Selección)
"Cuando éramos tú y yo"	"When There Was Me and You"	Spanish (Argentina)	Victoria (High School Musical: La Selección)
"あなたといた時" (Anata to Ita Toki)	"When There Was Me and You"	Japanese	Hitomi Shimatani
"Bop to the Top"	"Bop to the Top"	Spanish (Mexico)	High School Musical "La Selección"
"Bop to the Top"	"Bop to the Top"	Spanish (Argentina)	Colo & Delfina (High School Musical: La Selección)
"Breaking Free (Asian Version)"	"Breaking Free"	English	Vince Chong, Nikki Gil & Alicia Pan
"Breaking Free (European Version)"	"Breaking Free"	English	Josh Hoge & Nikki Flores
"Tem Que Tentar"	"Breaking Free"	Portuguese (Brasil)	Fellipe Guadanucci & Lenora Hage (High School Musical: A Seleção)
"Se Provi A Volare"	"Breaking Free"	Italian	Luca Dirisio
"另一個自己" (Ling yi ge zi ji)	"Breaking Free"	Mandarin Chinese	Anson Hu & Stephy Tang
"Briser Mes Chaînes"	"Breaking Free"	French	Sofiane
"Sólo Hay Que Intentar"	"Breaking Free"	Spanish (Mexico)	Roger González & Carla Medina
"Donde Hay Libertad"	"Breaking Free"	Spanish (Mexico)	High School Musical "La Selección"
"No Dejes De Soñar"	"Breaking Free"	Spanish (Spain)	Conchita
"Masz w sobie wiarę"	"Breaking Free"	Polish	Hania Stach i Andrzej Lampert
"ממריאים" (Mamri'im)	"Breaking Free"	Hebrew	Gilat Hillel & Shanie Chauhan
"Наш звездный час" (Nash zvezdniy chas)	"Breaking Free"	Russian	Sergey Lazarev & Kseniya Larina
"Tem Que Tentar"	"Breaking Free"	Portuguese (Brazil)	Fabiola Ribeiro & Beto Marden
"Estamos Todos Juntos"	"We're All in This Together"	Spanish (Mexico)	High School Musical "La Selección"
"1+1=11"	"We're All in This Together"	Mandarin Chinese	Go Go Club
"Minna Star!"	"We're All in This Together"	Japanese	AAA
"Мы все вместе" (My vse vmeste)	"We're All in This Together"	Russian	Sergey Lazarev Kseniya Larina & Naveen Kanianthara

Hindi title	Original name	Singer(s)
"Yeh Man Gaaye Kyon"	"Start of Something New"	Naresh Kamath & Sunidhi Chauhan
"Ho Ek Hi Aim"	"Get'cha Head in the Game"	Naresh Kamath
"Is Dil Ne Kahi Jo Baatein Nayi"	"What I've Been Looking For"	Neuman Pinto & Shweta Pandit
"Is Dil Ne Kahi Jo Baatein Nayi (Reprise)"	"What I've Been Looking For (Reprise)"	Naresh Kamath & Sunidhi Chauhan
"Jo Karte Ho Wohi Karo"	"Stick to the Status Quo"	Shweta Pandit & Neuman Pinto, (Chorus) Samantha Edwards, Suzanne D'Mello & Dean D'Souza
"Na Jaane Main Aur Tu"	"When There Was Me and You"	Sunidhi Chauhan
"Paaye Yeh'	"Bop to the Top"	Neuman Pinto & Shweta Pandit
"Choole Ambar Hi'	"Breaking Free"	Naresh Kamath & Sunidhi Chauhan
"Yeh Maujh Hai Ek Ho Jaaye'	"We're All in This Together"	Naresh Kamath, Sunidhi Chauhan, Neuman Pinto & Shweta Pandit, (Chorus) Samantha Edwards, Suzanne D'Mello & Dean D'Souza

== Release history ==
Region	Date	Label	Format
United States	January 10, 2006	Walt Disney	CD
Canada	January 10, 2006	Walt Disney	CD
Australia	May 27, 2006	EMI	CD
South Africa	November 13, 2006	EMI	CD
India	October 2006	Times Music	CD
Japan	January 17, 2007	Avex Marketing	CD
United States	August 17, 2018	Walt Disney, Urban Outfitters Exclusive	LP

== See also ==
- High School Musical
- High School Musical 2
- High School Musical 3: Senior Year
- High School Musical: El desafio (Argentina)
