= Nopal Beat Records =

Mexican record label and music collective

Nopal Beat Records is a record label and music collective, based in Guadalajara, Jalisco, Mexico. It specializes in a fusion of electronic music with various styles of Latin music (a style usually referred to as acid cabaret). The name comes from the traditional Mexican vegetable nopal (an opuntia cactus, present in the coat of arms of Mexico).

Nopal was founded in 1999 as an independent label.

Since 2002, it has been associated with EMI Music Publishing as a joint venture under an administration agreement.

== Production ==
- Nopal Beat Compilation: Acid Cabaret 1
- Through French label Cyber Production:
  - Mexico Part 1
  - Mexico Part 2
  - Sussie 4
- Nopal Beat Compilation: Acid Cabaret 2

== Associated musicians and groups ==
- Shock Bukara
- Fat Naked Lady
- Sussie 4
- Sweet Electra
- Double Helix
- Galapago
- Axkan
- Revolver
- Luis Flores
