= Sueño Electro I =

Studio album by Belanova
- Released: 25 October 2010
- Recorded: Mexico
- Genre: Pop
- Producer: Armando Ávila & Belanova

Belanova chronology
Tour Fantasía Pop (2008)	Sueño Electro I (2010)	Sueño Electro II (2011)

Singles from Sueño Electro I
- 1. "Nada De Más" Released: 2 August 2010; 2. "No Me Voy a Morir" Released: 8 December 2010

Sueño Electro I (Electro Dream l) is the Grammy Award-nominated fourth studio album from the Mexican electropop band Belanova, and the first half of the Sueño Electro project. It was originally announced through the band's official Twitter page, along with a redesigned band logo and concept art image. The album was released in select markets in Mexico on October 23, 2010, and then throughout all of Mexico, the United States, and Latin America on October 25. Bassist Richie Arreola first confirmed in an interview that the album would be the first half of a double album. The band later commented that Sueño Electro II was recorded simultaneously with the first.

The band revealed that there would be a wide range of musical styles present throughout the albums, including throwbacks to past albums Fantasía Pop and Cocktail, as well as new sounds for the band such as French horns and a string orchestra.

== Reception ==
On November 4, Sueño Electro I made its debut at number 9 on the Billboard Top Latin Albums Chart and at number 5 on the Latin Pop Albums chart respectively. The album debuted at number 6 on the AMPROFON Top 100 Mexico charts, and number 5 on their Spanish Genre Charts.

The album was nominated for the 2011 Latin Grammy for Best Pop Album by a Duo or Group with Vocal.

== Track listing ==
The track listing was announced on September 6, 2010, via the band's Twitter page.

No.	Title	Length
1.	"Sólo Para Mi" ("Just For Me")	3:34
2.	"Chica Robot" ("Robot Girl")	3:23
3.	"Nada De Más" ("Nothing More")	3:27
4.	"No Me Voy a Morir" ("I'm Not Going To Die")	4:03
5.	"Y Mi Corazón..." ("And My Heart...")	3:21
6.	"Pow Pow"	3:11
7.	"Tic-Toc"	4:14
8.	"Hoy Desperté" ("I Woke Up Today")	3:58
9.	"Necio" ("Stubborn")	4:06
10.	"Tú y Yo" ("You and Me")	3:30

== Singles and Notable Songs ==
- "Nada De Más" was released as the first single on August 2, 2010, going on to be successful on top music charts in the country and throughout Latin America. The video was directed by the Colombian film director Simon Brand.
- In December 2010, various sources reported that the second single would be "No Me Voy a Morir". The music video is a prequel to "Nada De Más" and was also directed by Simon Brand.
- "Tic-Toc" was leaked online more than a month before the album's release. The track features a very electronic sound and English lyrics. The song was rumoured to be the third single from the album, but it was not released. A duet version with Lena Katina was later recorded for Sueño Electro II and released as a promotional single.
- The band filmed a video for "Y Mi Corazón..." at the Monterrey Institute of Technology and Higher Education. Like "Tic-Toc", it was rumoured to be the third single, but the band released "Mariposas" from Sueño Electro II as the next single after "No Me Voy a Morir".
- "Sólo Para Mí" was offered for free on iTunes Mexico for a short time as part of a promotion, despite not being a single. It managed to reach number 1 on the charts.
- Although not a single, Belanova uploaded a homemade video for "Pow Pow" onto their official website, and later held a contest in which fans submitted their own videos for the song.
