= Tour Fantasía Pop =

Live album by Belanova
- Released: 8 December 2008 (Mexico); 8 December 2008 (U.S.)
- Recorded: Unknown
- Genre: Synthpop
- Label: Universal Music Mexico
- Producer: Belanova

Belanova chronology
Fantasía Pop (2007)	Tour Fantasía Pop (2008)	Sueño Electro I (2010)

Tour Fantasía Pop is a live album recorded by Mexican synthpop band Belanova. It features live recordings of their tour supporting their third studio album, Fantasía Pop, and was released in 2008.

== Track listing ==
All tracks by Belanova

Tour Fantasía Pop CD

1. "Intro"
2. "Rosa Pastel (Live)"
3. "Cada Que... (Live)"
4. "Por Esta Vez (Live)"
5. "Niño (Live)"
6. "Barco De Papel (Live)"
7. "Toma Mi Mano (Live)"
8. "Tus Ojos (Live)"
9. "Paso El Tiempo (Live)"
10. "Eres Tu (Live)"
11. "Me Pregunto (Live)"
12. "Por Ti (Live)"
13. "Baila Mi Corazon (Live)"
14. "Rockstar (Live)"
15. "One, Two, Three, Go! (Live)"

Tour Fantasía Pop DVD

1. "Intro"
2. "Rosa Pastel (Live)"
3. "Cada Que... (Live)"
4. "Por Esta Vez (Live)"
5. "Niño (Live)"
6. "Barco De Papel (Live)"
7. "Toma Mi Mano (Live)"
8. "Tus Ojos (Live)"
9. "Paso El Tiempo (Live)"
10. "Eres Tu (Live)"
11. "Me Pregunto (Live)"
12. "Por Ti (Live)"
13. "Baila Mi Corazon (Live)"
14. Entrevista 4 (Interview with the band)
15. "Rockstar (Live)"
16. "One, Two, Three, Go! (Live)"
17. Credits
18. "Solo De Bajo De Richie" (Richie's Bass Solo)

== Personnel ==
- Ricardo Arreola – guitar, Bass
- Denisse Guerrero – vocals
- Edgar Huerta – keyboards, programming
