= Baila Mi Corazón =

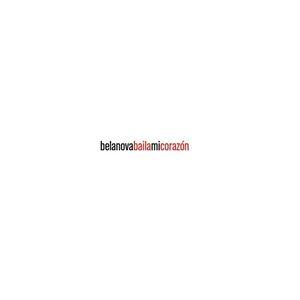

Single by Belanova

from the album Fantasía Pop
- Released: July 2, 2007
- Recorded: 2007
- Genre: Electropop; dance-pop
- Length: 3:36
- Label: Universal México
- Songwriters: Denisse Guerrero; Edgar Huerta; Ricardo Arreola
- Producers: Denisse Guerrero; Edgar Huerta; Ricardo Arreola

Belanova singles chronology
"Niño" (2006)	"Baila Mi Corazón" (2007)	"Toma Mi Mano" (2007)

"Baila Mi Corazón" (My Heart Dances) is the lead single from Belanova's third studio album, Fantasía Pop. The song premiered on July 2, 2007 in Mexico, followed by release in Argentina, Spain, the United States and the rest of Latin America. The digital download was released on August 20. A pre-loaded bundle of audio and video tracks, including "Baila Mi Corazón", "Rock Star", "Vestida de Azul" and "Me Pregunto", was certified Platinum in Mexico for 100,000 units sold.

== Music video ==
The video was filmed on July 13, 2007 in Mexico City and was directed by Oliver Castro, who also previously directed Belanova's "Por Tí" music video. It premiered on MTV Latin America on September 6. The video features the band playing the song on several paper-like animated backgrounds, that range from an open green field and a pink sky to a dark night and an open sea. The behind scenes of the music video were aired by TV Azteca on August 11.

== Track listing ==
CD Single

1. Baila Mi Corazón (Radio Edit) - 3:21
2. Baila Mi Corazón (Album Version) - 3:36

Remixes (EP)

1. Baila Mi Corazón (Mario Ochoa Remix) - 4:20
2. Baila Mi Corazón (Mario Ochoa Remix Club) - 7:40
3. Baila Mi Corazón (Tom Sawyer) - 4:39
4. Baila Mi Corazón (Tom Sawyer Club Mix) - 6:36
5. Baila Mi Corazón (Mijangos Club 80s Mix Radio Edit) - 4:21
6. Baila Mi Corazón (Mijangos Club 80s Mix) - 7:44
7. Baila Mi Corazón (Imazué Latin Soul Mix Radio Edit) - 4:06
8. Baila Mi Corazón (Imazué Latin Soul Remix Club) - 4:21
9. Baila Mi Corazón (Mijangos & Elorza Radio Edit) - 3:59
10. Baila Mi Corazón (Mijangos & Elorza Bossa Club Mix) - 5:48

Single (Lounge Mix)

1. Baila Mi Corazón (Lounge Mix) - 2:59

== Charts ==
Chart (2007)	Peak positions
Spain (PROMUSICAE)	1
Spain Rigtone (PROMUSICAE)	19
US Hot Latin Songs (Billboard)	17
US Latin Pop Airplay (Billboard)	9
US Latin Rhythm Airplay (Billboard)	28
US Tropical Airplay (Billboard)	37
Venezuela Pop Rock (Record Report)	3

== Certifications ==
Region	Certification	Certified units/sales
Mexico (AMPROFON) Master ringtone	9× Platinum+Gold	235,000^{*}
Mexico (AMPROFON) Pre-loaded bundle	Platinum	100,000^{*}
^{*} Sales figures based on certification alone.
