= Cada Que... =

"Cada que..."

Single by Belanova

from the album Fantasía Pop
- Language: Spanish
- Released: January 7, 2008 (Radio)
- Recorded: 2007
- Genre: Electropop; dance-pop; pop rock
- Length: 3:44
- Label: Universal México
- Songwriters: Denisse Guerrero, Ricardo Arreola, Edgar Huerta
- Producer: Cachorro López

Belanova singles chronology
| "Toma Mi Mano" (2007) | "Cada que..." (2008) | "One, Two, Three, Go! (1, 2, 3, Go!)" (2008) |

Cada Que... (literal translation "Everytime That..." is the third single in Mexico and second worldwide single from Belanova's third studio album, Fantasía Pop. The song had been sent out to radio outlets by the end of October 2007 backed with "Baila Mi Corazón" remixes. Along with "Baila Mi Corazón", it has sold over 200,000 downloads in the United States. The song has brought them success in the United States, becoming the band's first single to break the Top Ten of the Hot Latin Tracks chart.

== Music video ==
The music video was filmed in Mexico City in early November 2007. The video premiered on December 14 on Ritmoson Latino.

== Formats and track listings ==
CD Promo & Digital Release - EP

1. "Cada Que..." [Album Version] - 3:42
2. "Baila Mi Corazón" [Mijangos Bossa Edit] - 3:59
3. "Baila Mi Corazón" [Imazue Latin Soul Mix Edit] - 4:05

== Charts ==
| Chart (2007–2008) | Peak Position |
|---|---|
| Mexico (Monitor Latino) | 1 |
| US Hot Latin Songs (Billboard) | 6 |
| US Latin Pop Airplay (Billboard) | 3 |
| US Tropical Airplay (Billboard) | 38 |
| US Latin Rhythm Airplay (Billboard) | 40 |
| Venezuela (Record Report) | 6 |
| Venezuela Pop Rock (Record Report) | 4 |
| Year End Charts (2008) | Peak positions |
| US Hot Latin Songs (Billboard) | 6 |
| US Latin Pop Songs (Billboard) | 13 |

== See also ==
- List of number-one songs of 2008 (Mexico)
