= What I've Been Looking For =

2006 song from High School Musical

Song by Ashley Tisdale and Lucas Grabeel

from the album High School Musical
- Released: 2006
- Recorded: 2005
- Genre: Teen pop
- Length: 2:04
- Label: Walt Disney
- Songwriters: Andy Dodd and Adam Watts
- Producers: Andy Dodd and Adam Watts

"What I've Been Looking For (Reprise)"

Song by Zac Efron (Note: Efron is credited but his vocals were mixed with those of Drew Seeley.) and Vanessa Hudgens

from the album High School Musical
- Released: 2006
- Recorded: 2005
- Genre: Pop
- Length: 1:20
- Label: Walt Disney
- Songwriters: Andy Dodd and Adam Watts
- Producers: Andy Dodd and Adam Watts

"What I've Been Looking For" is a song from the Disney Channel Original Movie High School Musical (2006). The song was written and produced by Andy Dodd and Adam Watts, and it was included on the film soundtrack of the same name. Ashley Tisdale and Lucas Grabeel sing it in a fast tempo. A reprise version, titled "What I've Been Looking For (Reprise)" was also recorded, but in a slow tempo. It is credited to be performed by Zac Efron and Vanessa Hudgens, although Efron’s vocals were mixed with those of Drew Seeley.

"What I've Been Looking For" received positive reviews by music critics, being compared to Broadway musical performances. It peaked at number 35 on the Billboard Hot 100 chart and at number 34 on the Billboard Pop 100. Meanwhile, the reprise version peaked at number 67 and number 54, respectively on the same charts. The Spanish-language version of the soundtrack included a cover version by Mexican synthpop group Belanova, titled "Eres Tú", and the Brazilian group Ludov covered it for the Brazilian version of the soundtrack, titled as "O Que Eu Procurava".

== Composition ==
"What I've Been Looking For" was written and produced by Andy Dodd and Adam Watts. According to its music sheet, it was composed using common time in the key of A major, with a tempo of 142 beats per minute. It is a teen pop song built on the chord progression A–D–A/C♯–Bm7–E, and it was written in the common verse–chorus form. Ashley Tisdale and Lucas Grabeel, acting as the siblings Sharpay and Ryan Evans, perform the song in the Disney Channel Original Movie High School Musical (2006). Grabeel's vocals span from A_{3} to the note F♯_{5}.

A reprise version of "What I've Been Looking For" was also composed and credited to be sung by Zac Efron and Vanessa Hudgens, performing as Troy Bolton and Gabriella Montez. Later, it was revealed that Efron's singing voice was mixed with that of Drew Seeley.

== Promotion ==
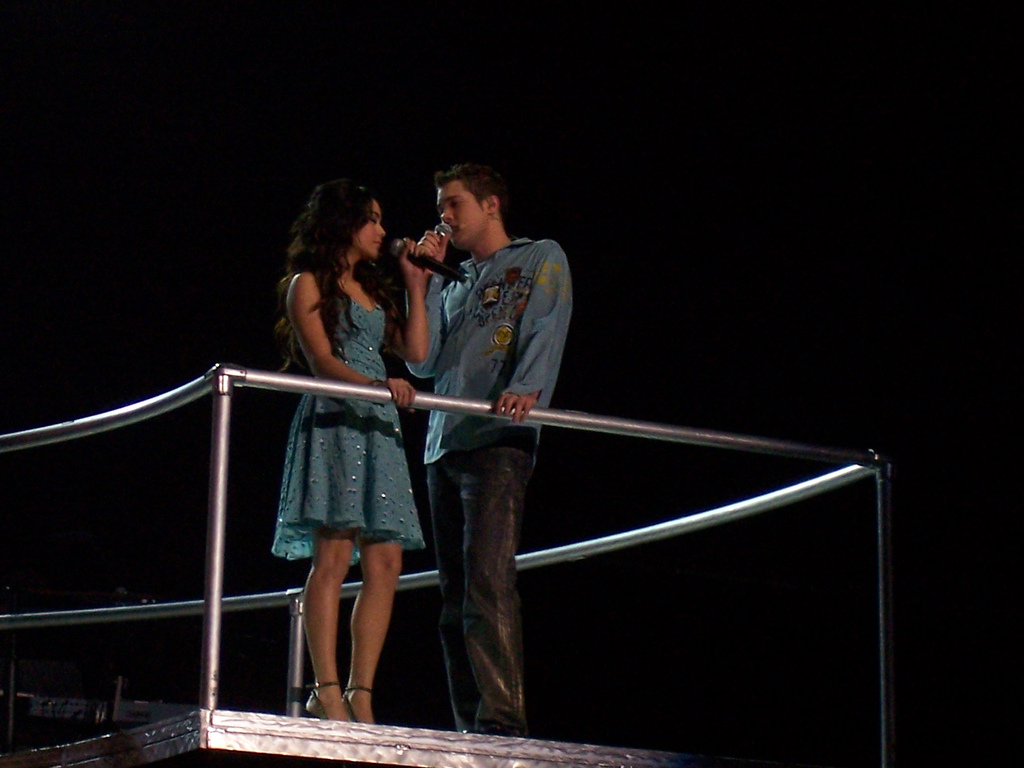
Hudgens and Seeley performing "What I've Been Looking For (Reprise)" during a High School Musical: The Concert show

In High School Musical, "What I've Been Looking For" was composed by Kelsi Nielsen (portrayed by Olesya Rulin). Sharpay and Ryan Evans sing an uptempo version of the song as their audition song for a role in the East High's upcoming winter musical Twinkle Towne. During the audition, the Evans dance and sing on stage. Later, Gabriella Montez tries to audition but Ms. Darbus (Alyson Reed) tells Gabriella she lacks of a co-singer, so Troy Bolton offers himself. Then, Ms. Darbus explains them it is too late to audition. As Kelsi leaves, she drops her music sheets so Troy and Gabriella help her. Kelsi then asks them to sing her song, in which Kelsi plays in the piano. A hidden Ms. Darbus listens to it, and then offers them a "callback audition".

"What I've Been Looking For" and its reprise version were included on the setlist for the High School Musical live cast concert, titled High School Musical: The Concert, and both versions were included in its live album (2007). Seeley replaced Efron's character during the shows. "What I've Been Looking For" was also included in the video game High School Musical: Sing It! (2007).

In 2006, the song was covered by Mexican synthpop band Belanova for the Spanish-language version of High School Musical, titled "Eres Tú". Brazilian group Ludov also covered the song, their version was titled "O Que Eu Procurava". During the filming of the commercials for the DVD High School Musical: Encore Edition, eighth grader from Exeter Township Junior High School Samantha Sostak and her sister performed the song with cast member Corbin Bleu.

== Critical reception ==
"What I've Been Looking For" received positive reviews from music critics. Heather Phares wrote for AllMusic the song "flirts with satire" in its usage in the film because "[Sharpay and Ryan are] threatened by these upstarts from other cliques invading their territory", in reference of Troy and Gabriella's performance. Phares considered its melody "so bright" and Tisdale and Grabeel's vocals "so relentlessly cheery, it sounds like a parody of a show tune". A writer for Talkin' Broadway echoed this view, describing the song as "a clever parody of Broadway styles". Chris Willman, for Entertainment Weekly, compared the song with "You Are The Music In Me", a song included in the sequel High School Musical 2. He wrote "both an earnest Troy/Gabriella duet and an insincere (but more fun) showstopper for self-absorbed Sharpay". A reviewer for Common Sense Media highlighted the track. Commenting on the reprise, DVD Verdict said it "is a little soft". The Christian Broadcasting Network offered a spiritual analysis of the song: "[it is] a great opportunity to look at who God is and His character, including the fact that He's always with us."

== Chart performance ==
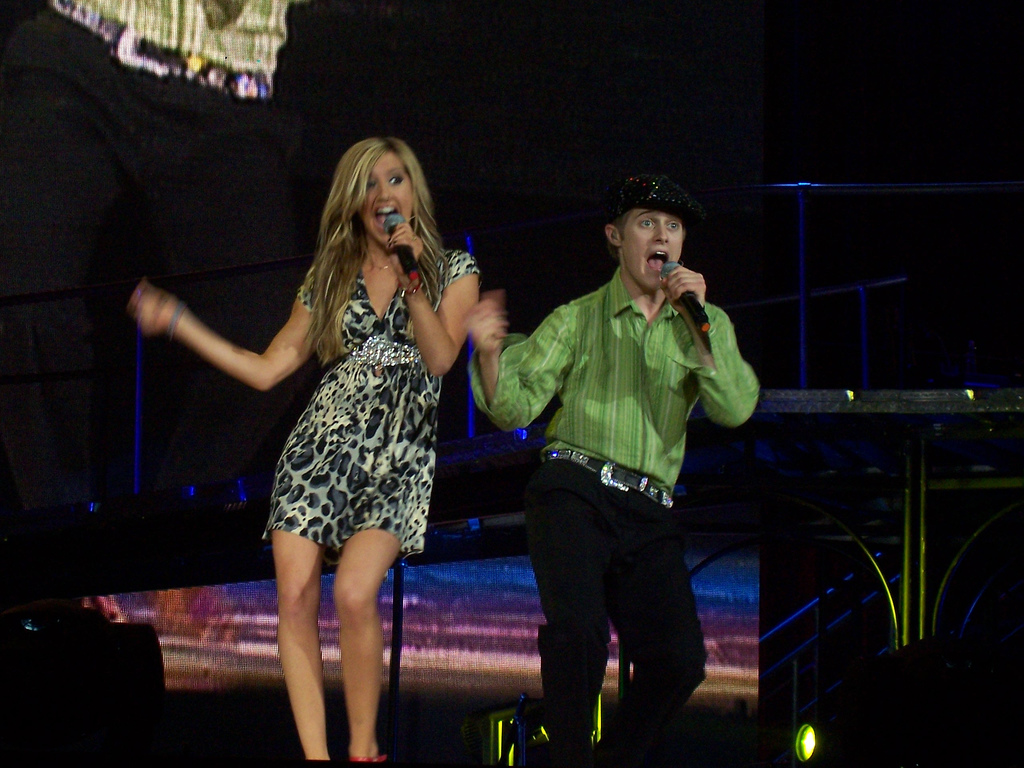
Tisdale and Grabeel performing the song live.

In the United States, "What I've Been Looking For" peaked at number 35 on the Billboard Hot 100 and 34 on the Pop 100 chart. The song was eventually certified as gold by the Recording Industry Association of America. The reprise version appeared in the same charts, reaching the numbers 67 and 54, respectively. In the United Kingdom, "What I've Been Looking For" debuted and peaked at number 155 on the UK Singles Chart.

== Charts ==
=== Weekly charts ===
Chart (2006–2007)	Peak position
UK Singles (OCC)	155
US Billboard Hot 100	35
US Pop 100 (Billboard)	34

=== Reprise version ===
==== Weekly charts ====
Chart (2006)	Peak position
US Billboard Hot 100	67
US Pop 100 (Billboard)	54

== Certifications ==
Region	Certification	Certified units/sales
United Kingdom (BPI)	Silver	200,000^{‡}
United States (RIAA)	Gold	500,000^{*}
^{*} Sales figures based on certification alone.^{‡} Sales+streaming figures based on certification alone.
