= Me Pregunto =

Single by Belanova

from the album Dulce Beat
- Language: Spanish
- Released: 11 May 2005 (Mexico); January 2006 (U.S.)
- Recorded: 2005
- Genre: Electropop
- Length: 3:06
- Label: Universal México
- Songwriters: Denisse Guerrero, Ricardo Arreola, Edgar Huerta

Belanova singles chronology
"Aún Así Te Vas" (2004)	"Me Pregunto" (2005)	"Por Ti" (2005)

"Me Pregunto" (I Wonder) is the first single from the album Dulce Beat, the second studio album by the Mexican band Belanova. The song was released to Mexican radio in May 2005 by Universal Music.

The track hit number thirty-three on Hot Latin Tracks on the Billboard Charts in the United States, becoming the band's biggest international hit to date. When "Dulce Beat Live" was released a live version of the song was certified 2× Platinum for sales of 200,000 units in a pre-loaded format. A pre-loaded bundle of audio and video tracks, including "Baila Mi Corazón", "Rock Star", "Vestida de Azul" and "Me Pregunto" was also certified Platinum for an additional 100,000 units sold.

== Music video ==
The accompanying video for the single was directed by Ricardo Calderon and was filmed in Mexico City. The video premiered on MTV on June 13, 2005 and reached number one on MTV's "Los 10 + Pedidos", VH1's Top 20, Telehit's Top Ten and TV Azteca's Top Ten. The single also enjoyed international success.

== Track List Maxi Single - Promo CD ==
1. Me Pregunto - 3:06
2. Me Pregunto (Mijangos Classic House Mix) - 7:45
3. Me Pregunto (Mijangos Classic House Mix Radio Edit) - 4:03
4. Me Pregunto (Capellas) - 4:54
5. Enhanced Part:
- Me Pregunto (Music Video)
- EPK (Interview)

== Charts ==
Chart (2006)	Peak
US Hot Latin Songs (Billboard)	33
US Latin Pop Airplay (Billboard)	12

== Certifications ==
Region	Certification	Certified units/sales
Mexico (AMPROFON) Pre-loaded, live version	2× Platinum	200,000^{*}
Mexico (AMPROFON) Pre-loaded, bundle	Platinum	100,000^{*}
^{*} Sales figures based on certification alone.
