= Fantasía Pop =

2007 studio album by Belanova

Studio album by Belanova
- Released: MEX 10 September 2007; USA 11 September 2007; ESP 8 April 2008
- Studio: Master House Studios, Miami, Florida; Mondo Mix, Buenos Aires, Argentina
- Genre: Pop; pop rock; electropop
- Label: Universal

Belanova chronology
Dulce Beat Live (2006)	Fantasía Pop (2007)	Tour Fantasía Pop (2008)

Alternative cover
- Deluxe Edition cover

Singles from Fantasía Pop
- 1. "Baila Mi Corazón" Released: 2 July 2007; 2. "Toma Mi Mano" Released: 8 October 2007; 3. "Cada Que..." Released: 7 January 2008; 4. "One, Two, Three, Go! (1, 2, 3, Go!)" Released: 12 May 2008; 5. "Paso El Tiempo" Released: 15 September 2008

Professional ratings
Review scores
Source	Rating
Allmusic	3/5 stars

Fantasía Pop (Spanish for: Pop Fantasy) is the third studio album by Mexican electropop band Belanova. It was released worldwide in September 2007. The album was recorded in Argentina. The lead single, "Baila Mi Corazón" premiered on July 2 on Mexican radio station Los 40 Principales.

It was certified gold by AMPROFON in Mexico only three days after its release, for selling over 50,000 copies. The album entered the Mexican charts at number eighteen and went to number one in its third week. "Baila Mi Corazón" ranked in the top twenty in the U.S. Latin Pop Airplay. "Cada Que..." went on to sell over 200,000 downloads in the United States alone. When the album was certified Platinum in March 2008 in Mexico, the band made history when it was published that digital sales of the album were five times higher than the physical sales. The album was released in Spain in early April 2008.

It won Best Pop Album by a Duo or Group with Vocals at the 9th Latin Grammy Awards. At the MTV Latin America Awards 2008, Belanova won Best North Artist and Video of the Year for "One, Two, Three, Go!".

== Track listing ==
All tracks by Belanova

Fantasía Pop

No.	Title	Length
1.	"Baila Mi Corazón" ("Dance My Heart")	3:36
2.	"One, Two, Three, Go! (1, 2, 3, Go!)"	2:45
3.	"Por esta vez" ("For This Time")	3:19
4.	"Rockstar"	3:06
5.	"Paso el tiempo" ("Time Passed")	3:27
6.	"Vestida de azul" ("Dressed in Blue")	3:36
7.	"Cada Que..." ("Whenever")	3:44
8.	"Aún" ("Still")	3:16
9.	"Bye Bye"	2:24
10.	"Toma Mi Mano" ("Take My Hand")	2:33
11.	"Dulce fantasía" ("Sweet Fantasy")	3:23

Fantasía Pop - Deluxe Edition
(Released 28 July 2008 in Mexico and 29 July 2008 in the United States)

- CD

11-Track CD, as well as the bonus tracks:

12. "Mírame" - 3:05

13. "Baila Mi Corazón" [Mijangos & Elorza Bossa Radio Edit] - 4:01

14. "Baila Mi Corazón" [Mariano Ochoa Remix] - 4:20

15. "Baila Mi Corazón" [Imazué Latin Soul Mix Radio Edit] - 4:04

16. "Cada Que..." [DJ Raff Remix Radio Edit] - 4:47

17. "Cada Que..." [Mood-Fu Remix] - 4:00

18. "Toma Mi Mano" [Demo] - 2:09

- Bonus DVD
1. "Baila Mi Corazón"
2. "Cada Que..."
3. "Toma Mi Mano"
4. Making of "Cada Que..."
5. Exclusive Images
6. Belanova - Photo Gallery

== Personnel ==
=== Belanova ===
- Denisse Guerrero – vocals
- Ricardo Arreola – guitar, bass
- Edgar Huerta – keyboards

=== Additional personnel ===
- Fito Páez: Piano on "Toma Mi Mano"
- Cachorro López: Baritone guitar on "Por Esta Vez"
- Sebastián Schon: Acoustic guitars on "Vestida de Azúl" and "Dulce Fantasía"

== Production ==
- Arranged by Belanova
- Produced by Belanova and Cachorro López
- Recorded at Mondo Mix by Sebastián Schon; assisted by Demián Nava and Edgar Huerta
- Mixed at Mondo Mix by Cesar Sogbe (except "Baila Mi Corazón"; mixed at Masterhouse in Miami)
- Mastered by Tom Baker at Precision Mastering, Los Angeles, CA.

=== Other personnel ===
- Photography: Fernando, Gerardo Montiel and Soni Maya.
- Art Direction and Design: Pico Adworks

== Charts ==
Chart (2007)	Peak position
Mexican Albums Chart	1
Mexican Latin Albums Chart	1
U.S. Billboard Latin Albums	18
U.S. Billboard Latin Pop Albums	8
U.S. Billboard Heatseekers	11
U.S. Billboard Heatseekers (South Central)	3

== Certifications ==
Region	Certification	Certified units/sales
Ecuador	—	50,000
Mexico (AMPROFON)	Gold	50,000^{^}
^{^} Shipments figures based on certification alone.
