= Denisse Guerrero =

Mexican musician and singer-songwriter (born 1980)

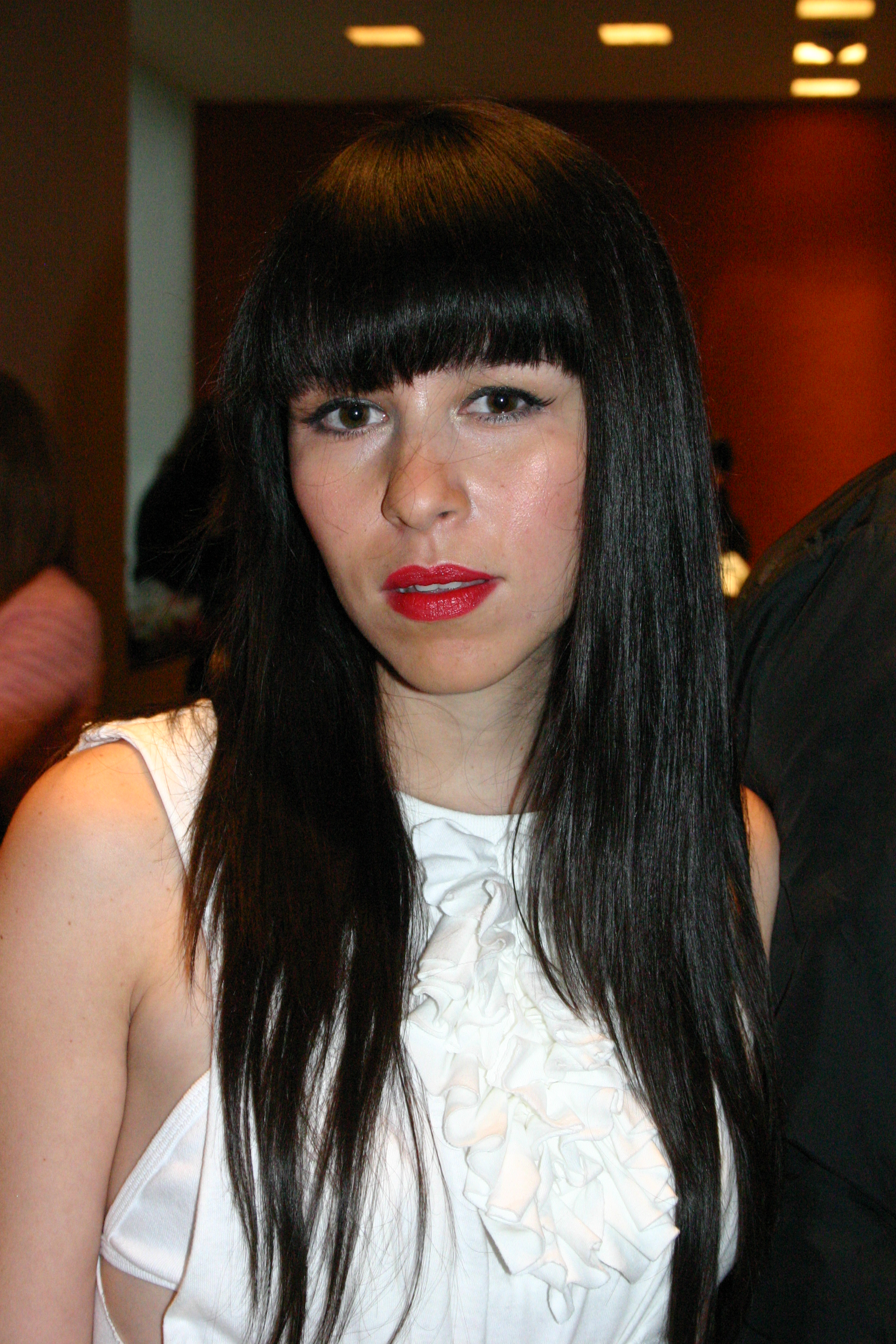
- Guerrero in 2006

Background information
- Born: Denisse Guerrero Flores; 8 August 1980 (age 45); Los Mochis, Sinaloa, Mexico
- Genres: Pop electropop
- Occupations: Singer, songwriter
- Instrument: Vocals (Mezzo-soprano)
- Years active: 2000–2018, 2023-present

Denisse Guerrero Flores (born 8 August 1980, Los Mochis, Sinaloa) is a Mexican musician and singer-songwriter, best known as the lead vocalist of the electropop band Belanova.

The band has released five albums since signing to Virus Records and later to Universal Mexico, in 2000.

== Music career ==
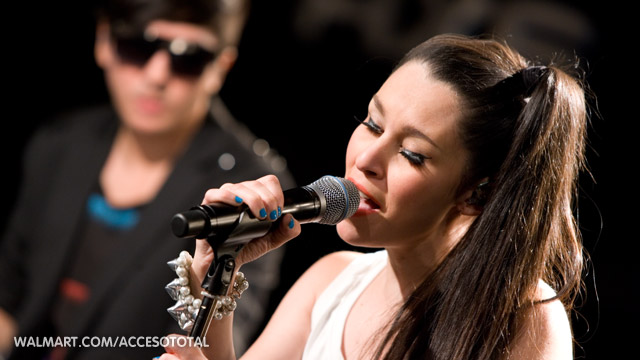
Guerrero singing in 2010

When she was eight years old, Guerrero won a Los Mochis singing competition. She has named this event as the spark that inspired her to pursue singing as a career.

Since I was little I sang and took part in all I could ... until one day, when I was about eight, I was chosen Queen of the Los Mochis Carnival after my mom entered me in the pageant. ... When I grew up, I decided I had to find a place where I could do things I was interested in, things that I couldn't do in Los Mochis.

Guerrero moved from Los Mochis to Guadalajara, Jalisco to pursue singing and music composition, as well as to study home design, in which she obtained a university degree. She worked with various musicians from the city before meeting Edgar Huerta and Richie Arreola and forming Belanova.

=== Belanova ===
Belanova is a Mexican synthpop Latin Grammy award-winning band that formed in the city of Guadalajara, Jalisco, in 2000. The group consists of Denisse Guerrero (lead vocals), Edgar Huerta (keyboards, programming), and Ricardo "Richie" Arreola (bass, guitar). The band was signed to Virus Records in 2002 and subsequently to Universal Music. To date, they have released five studio albums.

== Other projects ==
Denisse Guerrero collaborated with fellow Mexican electronic band Sussie 4 on two tracks from their album Música Moderna: "Suite Tropical" and "Escapar". Though it was announced that the band was going to contribute to the soundtrack for the movie "Cuando Las Cosas Suceden", nothing ever materialized. The band worked with Aleks Syntek on a song called "Laberinto", which appears on Syntek's album Lección de Vuelo, as well as with the Mexican band Moenia on the track "Me Equivoqué" from Moenia's album "Solar". They provided music for a television ad campaign promoting Wella Latin America with TV ads airing upon the release of their third album "Fantasía Pop". In 2009, the songs "Yo Nunca Vi Televisión" and "Oye Tweety!" were recorded for the promotion of the Chilean TV show "31 Minutos" and the iconic Tweety Bird, respectively. In 2010, Denisse Guerrero sang with Mexican band Panda for their feature on MTV Unplugged, on the song "Sistema Sanguineo Fallido." The band participated in the second volume of a tribute to Mexican band Caifanes, recording a cover version of the song "Viento" which was released in 2011. During the 2012 Summer Olympics in London, England, Belanova (as part of UMLE) partnered with Coca-Cola, recording a Spanish version of and video for the song "Anywhere in the World" as part of the promotional campaign.

Guerrero is active in the Mexican fashion scene. She is a model for the brand cherryproject, owned by her friend Jonathan Morales. In 2012, she was chosen as the official image of the International Designers Mexico convention. She is preparing a line of clothing and accessories with the Mexican graphic designer Ricardo Luévanos.

Guerrero made her acting debut on the online series Yo También Soy Marilyn, appearing as herself in one episode. She also recorded a song titled "Marilyn" (as yet unreleased in full) which played over the end credits.

Apart from her work with Belanova, she has worked with several other Mexican musicians, such as Sussie 4, Pxndx and Moenia.
