= Rosa Pastel (Belanova song) =

Single by Belanova

from the album Dulce Beat
- Released: April 2, 2006 (Mexico, Argentina, Colombia); December 14, 2006 (U.S.)
- Recorded: 2005
- Genre: Synth-pop; electro rock
- Length: 3:06
- Label: Universal Mexico
- Songwriters: Denisse Guerrero Flores, Ricardo Arturo Arreola Palomera, Edgar Albino Huerta Castaneda
- Producers: Ricardo Arreola; Denisse Guerrero; Edgar Huerta; Cachorro López

Belanova singles chronology
"Por Ti" (2005)	"Rosa Pastel" (2006)	"Niño" (2006)

Rosa Pastel (English: Pastel Pink) is a song by Mexican pop band Belanova. It was released in April 2, 2006 in Mexico, as the third single from their album Dulce Beat (2006). After the success of “Por Ti”, the band re-issued the album as Dulce Beat 2.0, with Universal Records agreeing to make “Rosa Pastel” the single and promotional song from the new edition.

In 2023, the song experienced a resurgence in popularity after becoming a viral hit on TikTok, increasing in streams on Spotify and entering the daily chart in Mexico.

== Composition ==
"Rosa Pastel" is a synthpop song and the lyrics narrate love and nostalgia. At the time of recording, Denisse Guerrero of Belanova said that the song was written when she was in love, yet experiencing sadness at the same time.

== Music video ==
The music video was directed by Chicle and was filmed in Mexico City. The video ranked at number one on MTV's Los 10+ Pedidos Latinoamerica for 11 days. It also ranked on the best music videos from 2006 in #11, and #3 just counting Hispanic music videos.

== Track list ==
Digital Download

1. Rosa Pastel (Album version) – 3:06

== Charts ==
2006 chart performance for "Rosa Pastel"
Chart (2006)	Peak
US Latin Pop Airplay (Billboard)	26

2023 chart performance for "Rosa Pastel"
Chart (2023)	Peak position
Mexico (Billboard)	19
