= Belanova =

Mexican pop band

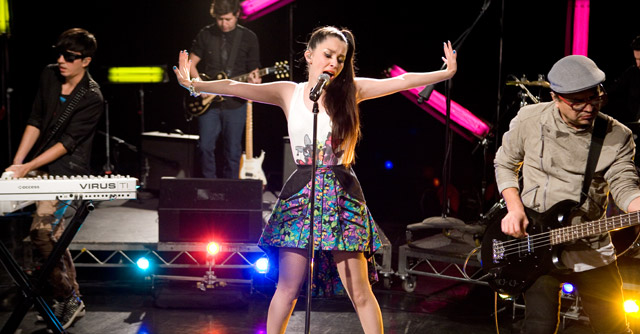
- From left to right: Edgar Huerta, Denisse Guerrero and Ricardo Arreola

Background information
- Origin: Guadalajara, Jalisco, Mexico
- Genres: Pop; electropop; Latin pop
- Years active: 2000–2018; 2023–present
- Labels: Virus; Universal Mexico
- Members: Denisse Guerrero; Ricardo Arreola; Edgar Huerta
- Website: www.belanova.com.mx

Belanova is a Mexican pop band formed in Guadalajara, Jalisco, in 2000. The band consists of Denisse Guerrero (lead vocals), Edgar Huerta (keyboards, programming) and Ricardo "Richie" Arreola (bass, guitar). Although these are the only three official members, several other musicians performed in the band's live lineup, most notably Israel "Campanita" Ulloa (drums) and Richo Acosta (guitar). The band was signed to Virus Records, owned by Universal Music, in 2002.

== History ==
=== Early years & Cocktail (2000–2004) ===
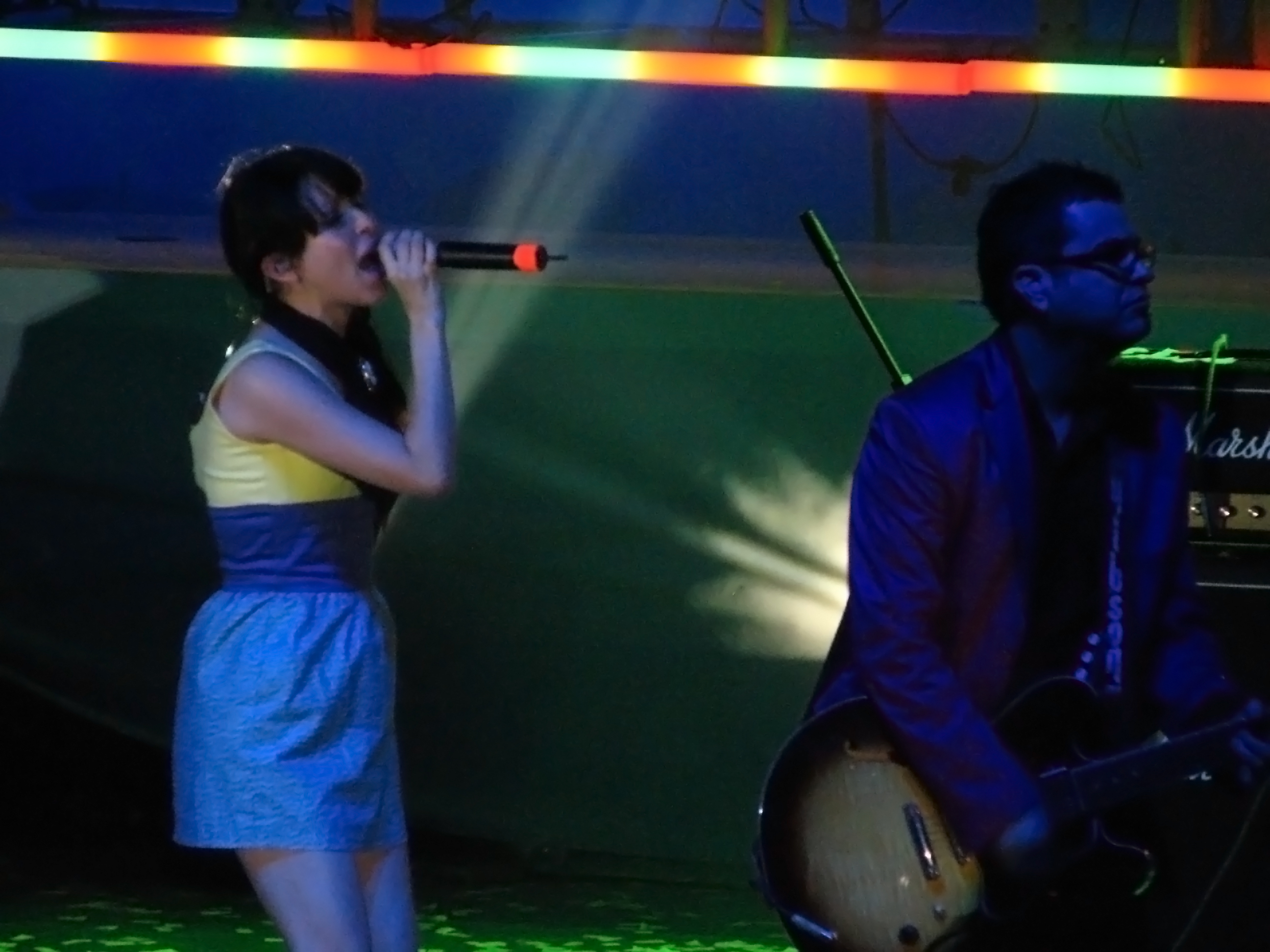
Belanova in concert

All three members of the band had a passion for music since childhood. Richie, from Guadalajara, developed his interest in music out of an admiration for The Beatles member Paul McCartney as a child. Edgar, also from Guadalajara, first became interested in music when his brother received a little keyboard as a Christmas present, showing little interest in it, and so Edgar simply began playing it one day. Denisse, originally from Los Mochis, Sinaloa, enjoyed singing since she was a child, and was previously a member of the band 40 Grados, literally "40 Degrees (Celsius)." The trio met in Guadalajara at a bar where both Edgar and Denisse were working.

Their first album was titled Cocktail and was released in 2003. The first single off the album was "Tus Ojos", which gained popularity due to its inclusion in a Mitsubishi publicity campaign, just after the Japanese car maker's arrival in Mexico. The song reached number one on the Mexican Top 100 and stayed there for 3 consecutive weeks. The album reached number five on the Mexican Albums Chart and was certified Gold; consequently, the album was named one of the Top Five albums of 2003 by Rolling Stone Mexico.

Apart from "Tus Ojos", the album also spawned two more top-twenty hits, "Suele Pasar" and "Y Aún Así Te Vas".

The band spent 2003 and 2004 on a 100-Concert Tour around Mexico promoting the album. Following Cocktail's success, management at Universal Music Mexico company encouraged the band to adopt a more commercial sound. Belanova flew to Argentina to record their second album, moving from electronic music to electropop, and the band was moved from the company's dance-music branch, Virus Records, to the larger one, Universal.

=== Dulce Beat & commercial success (2005–2007) ===
In 2005, Belanova released their second album, Dulce Beat, which gained popularity in the Latin American music market thanks largely to television stations such as MTV. The album was released on June 21, 2005, in Mexico, reaching the number one spot and holding the spot for four non-consecutive weeks. The album went on to sell over 200,000 copies in Mexico alone. The first single was "Me Pregunto", with a sound similar to that of Cocktail. The single was followed soon after by "Por Ti", much more grounded in pop music. Both songs reached number one in Mexico. "Rosa Pastel" was released in July 2006 as the third single. The fourth single, "Niño", was used in promotions for Pizza Hut Mexico. The huge success of the album prompted Disney's Latin American branch to ask the band to record a Spanish version of the song "What I've Been Looking For" ("Eres Tú") for the Latin American release of the High School Musical Soundtrack.

The album was very successful in Latin America, with sales of over 500,000. This led to the release of the band's first live album, "Dulce Beat Live", which went Gold in Mexico only few hours after it was released. The album includes a set of 16 songs performed live at the Foro Expo in Guadalajara, Jalisco, Mexico on March 10, 2006. A deluxe edition of Dulce Beat, featuring several acoustic versions of songs from Belanova's first two albums and a new vocal recording of "Te Quedas o Te Vas", was also released, titled Dulce Beat 2.0. Belanova's video "Por Ti" broke the record for the most weeks on MTV Mexico's Top 20, peaking at number one for twenty-nine weeks. When the album was released in the United States in the spring of 2006, it hit number fifty-nine on Billboard's Top Latin Albums Chart and reached the top ten on the Top Electronic Albums Chart. The band earned a Latin Grammy Nomination for "Mejor Álbum Vocal Pop Dúo o Grupo" ("Best Pop Vocal Album by a Group or Duo"), but lost to La Oreja de Van Gogh. Belanova became the most nominated Mexican Act on the 2006's MTV Video Music Awards Latin America, despite only winning "Mejor Artista Norte" ("Best Northern Artist").

=== Fantasía Pop & venture into foreign markets (2007–2009) ===
Belanova's third album, Fantasía Pop, featured a move further away from electropop and more towards pop. The album was released on September 10, 2007, in Mexico and Latin America, and on September 11, 2007, in the United States. The album was recorded in Argentina. The first single, "Baila Mi Corazón", premiered on July 2 on the Mexican radio station Los 40 Principales. In July 2007, the band signed a contract with Sony Ericsson México to release the model W580 as a special Belanova Edition, which included three new tracks from the album as well as a music video and a dance game. On August 18, 2007, the band shot the video for the second single from their album, "Toma Mi Mano". The song was included on the soundtrack for the Mexican film "Hasta El Viento Tiene Miedo" and served as a promotional single for the film. On September 12, 2007, it was reported that the album had sold over 50,000 copies in just three days in Mexico, which earned it Gold certification from AMPROFON. Promotion for the third single, "One, Two, Three, Go! (1, 2, 3, Go!)", began in summer 2008. The single received heavy airplay among Mexican pop radio stations. The music video was released on July 10, premiering on MTV. The band was named the most played act in Mexico of 2008 with the single "Cada Que..." topping the Year-End Charts. "Paso El Tiempo" was released as the final single off the album, coinciding with the release of the band's second live album, Tour Fantasía Pop. The album brought the group bigger success in foreign markets. They toured Mexico, Ibero-America, and the United States. Belanova was named 'Best New Band' by Yahoo! Spain, following the release of the album in early 2008. "Baila Mi Corazón" reached the top of Spain's airplay charts, but album sales never took off. The album was certified Oro (Latin Gold) in the United States after selling over 100,000 copies and the band announced their first headlining tour across the United States with 20 dates. "One, Two, Three, Go! (1, 2, 3, Go!)" was featured as a free "Single of the Week" on the Apple iTunes music store in the United States, beginning the week of July 29. In November 23 they won a Latin Grammy 2008 for their Album "Fantasía Pop"

In September 2008, the nominees for the Los Premios MTV Latinoamérica 2008 were announced, Belanova receiving the second highest number of nominations along with Argentine band Babasónicos, with six nominations each, just behind the Colombian singer Juanes. Belanova was the most nominated Mexican act. The band was also nominated at the Lunas del Auditorio Nacional and the Latin Grammys.

=== Sueño Electro project (2010–2012) ===
Belanova's fourth and fifth studio albums were recorded simultaneously but released separately as Sueño Electro I in 2010 and Sueño Electro II in 2011. The band first called Sueño Electro a "project in multiple parts" when asked about the significance of the numeral in the title of the first release. Vocalist Denisse Guerrero expressed that splitting the release into two parts allowed the band more freedom in experimenting in genres outside of their usual synthpop. Sueño Electro I is Belanova's fourth studio album, nominated for the 2011 Latin Grammy under Best Pop Album by a Duo or Group. It was announced on the band's Twitter page with an initial release window in the fall of 2010. Belanova stated in various interviews that the album would feature various musical styles, expressing that they experimented with many new instruments and sounds, focusing heavily on the production and recording process. The album was released early in some areas of Mexico on October 23, 2010, and in the rest of the country, as well as the United States and Latin America, on October 25. It debuted at number six on the AMPROFON Top 100 and at number nine on the Billboard Top Latin Albums Chart., also were representants of Pronósticos, a Mexican state-owned lottery company.

Sueño Electro II is the band's fifth studio album. It features similar musical styles as its predecessor, also experimenting with traditional Mexican Ranchera music. The album was released on September 6, 2011, throughout Mexico, the United States, and Latin America, in standard and deluxe formats. It debuted at number eight on the Billboard Top Latin Albums Chart. In Mexico, it debuted at number 20 on the AMPROFON Top 100 Chart.

Two successful singles were released from Sueño Electro I. The first, "Nada De Más", was released online and on radio on August 2, 2010. The music video premiered on television on September 27, 2010. "No Me Voy a Morir" went on to become the second single from Sueño Electro I in late 2010, and the music video premiered early the following year. It showcased several instruments new to the band, including a string orchestra and French horns. In May 2011, the band announced "Mariposas" as the first single from Sueño Electro II. The second single from Sueño Electro II released in late 2011 was "Hasta El Final", a song inspired by Mariachi music.

The band spent the final months of 2010 playing a short tour in various cities in the United States in support of Sueño Electro I. In early 2011, they toured shortly in Mexico and Latin America, most notably as part of Shakira's The Pop Festival Tour in Colombia and Mexico. The band also expressed interest in branching out into Europe and Asia. A tour entitled "Belanova Sessions" began in June 2010 to promote both Sueño Electro albums throughout Mexico, South America, and the United States. In April 2012, "Tour Sueño Electro II" began in the USA. In late 2012, the band was part of a short tour in the United States with Moderatto.

=== Canciones Para La Luna - Sinfónico En Vivo (2012–2014) ===
In February 2012, during promotion for International Designers Mexico, a fashion convention in which Denisse Guerrero was involved, she mentioned to the press that Belanova had begun work on the follow-up to the Sueño Electro albums. In an interview with Terra TV, the group confirmed that they had started writing and recording new material, focusing on dance music. For the first time in its history, the band worked with other musicians in writing songs for the album, including Jay de la Cueva of the Mexican band Moderatto. Denisse Guerrero reiterated that the album is "a step up and more geared toward dance". The band also confirmed Armando Ávila is one of the producers working on the new album after having worked together on the Sueño Electro albums.

Canciones para la luna was revealed as the album title in an interview with El Universal in September 2013. The live album was released digitally on October 8, 2013, for free download in Mexico in partnership with Pepsi Mexico. The album is a compilation of hits from past albums that with new arrangements and performed along a symphony and guest musicians. It also features two new songs, also performed live: "Juegos De Amor" and "Sólo Dos." The album was recorded before a live audience on September 2 in Mexico City. Several songs recorded at this performance are not included in the digital release. It is currently unknown if they will be released. "Sólo Dos" was released as the first single on October 8.

== Other projects ==
Denisse Guerrero worked with Mexican electronic band Sussie 4 on their album Música Moderna, singing on the tracks "Suite Tropical" and "Escapar". The band worked with Aleks Syntek on the song "Laberinto", which appears on Syntek's album Lección de Vuelo, as well as with the Mexican band Moenia on the track "Me Equivoqué" from their album "Solar". In 2010, Denisse Guerrero sang with the Mexican band Panda for their feature on MTV Unplugged, on the song "Sistema Sanguineo Fallido." The band participated in the second volume of a tribute album to the Mexican band Caifanes, which was released in 2011, recording a cover version of the song "Viento". Belanova provided music for a television ad campaign promoting Wella Latin America with TV ads airing upon the release of their third album "Fantasía Pop". In 2009, the songs "Yo Nunca Vi Televisión" and "Oye Tweety!" were recorded for the promotion of the Chilean TV show "31 Minutos" and a campaign involving the cartoon character Tweety Bird, respectively. During the 2012 Summer Olympics in London, England, Belanova (as part of UMLE) partnered with Coca-Cola, recording a Spanish version of and video for the song "Anywhere in the World" as part of the promotional campaign.

In 2014 Belanova participated in the album Dancing Queens: un tributo para ABBA performing a Spanish version of "Chiquitita".

== Discography ==
=== Studio albums ===
- 2003: Cocktail
- 2005: Dulce Beat
- 2007: Fantasía Pop
- 2010: Sueño Electro I
- 2011: Sueño Electro II
- 2018: Viaje al Centro del Corazón

=== Live albums ===
- 2006: Dulce Beat Live
- 2008: Tour Fantasía Pop
- 2013: Canciones Para La Luna - Sinfónico En Vivo

== Tours ==
=== Headlining ===
- 2004: Cocktail Tour
- 2006: Dulce Beat Live
- 2008: Tour Fantasía Pop
- 2010: Tour Sueño Electro I
- 2012: Tour Sueño Electro II
- 2024: Vida En Rosa Tour

=== Supporting ===
- 2011: Shakira – The Sun Comes Out World Tour

== Awards and nominations ==
Year	Award	Category	Result
2006	Los Premios MTV Latinoamérica	"Best Northern Artist"	Won
2006	Los Premios MTV Latinoamérica	"Best Pop Artist"	Nominated
2006	Los Premios MTV Latinoamérica	"Act of the Year"	Nominated
2006	Los Premios MTV Latinoamérica	"Best Group or Duo"	Nominated
2006	Latin Grammy	"Best Pop Album by a Group or Duo" (Dulce Beat)	Nominated
2007	Billboard Latin Music Awards	"Best Alternative Artist" (Dulce Beat)	Nominated
2007	Los Premios 40 Principales	"Best Mexican Act"	Nominated
2008
2008	Premios Oye!	"Best Group, Spanish"	Won
2008	Premios Oye!	"Album of the Year" (Fantasía Pop)	Nominated
2008	Premios Oye!	"Latin Video of the Year" (Cada Que...)	Nominated
2008	Los Premios MTV Latinoamérica	"Best Northern Artist"	Won
2008	Los Premios MTV Latinoamérica	"Video of the Year" (One, Two, Three, Go!)	Won
2008	Los Premios MTV Latinoamérica	"Best Group or Duo"	Nominated
2008	Los Premios MTV Latinoamérica	"Fan Club Award"	Nominated
2008	Los Premios MTV Latinoamérica	"Best Pop Act"	Nominated
2008	Los Premios MTV Latinoamérica	"Artist of the Year"	Nominated
2008	Lo Nuestro Awards	"Best Group or Duo"	Nominated
2008	Lo Nuestro Awards	"Video of the Year" (Baila Mi Corazón)	Nominated
2008	Lo Nuestro Awards	"Album of the Year" (Fantasía Pop)	Nominated
2008	Lo Nuestro Awards	"Song of the Year" (Baila Mi Corazón)	Nominated
2008	Premios Orgullosamente Latino	"Latin Group of the Year"	Nominated
2008	Billboard Latin Music Awards	"Best Alternative Artist"	Nominated
2008	Los Premios 40 Principales	"Best Mexican Act"	Won
2008	Latin Grammy Awards	"Best Pop Album by a Group or Duo" (Fantasía Pop)	Won
2009	Billboard Latin Music Awards	"Pop Airplay of the Year by a Group or Duo" (Cada Que...)	Nominated
2009	Premios Orgullosamente Latino	"Latin Song of the Year" (One, Two, Three, Go!)	Nominated
2009	Premios Orgullosamente Latino	"Latin Video of the Year" (One, Two, Three, Go!)	Nominated
2009	Premios Orgullosamente Latino	"Latin Group of the Year"	Nominated
2011
2011	Latin Grammy Awards	"Best Pop Album by a Group or Duo" (Sueño Electro I)	Nominated
2011	MTV Europe Music Awards	"Worldwide Act – Latin American"	Nominated
2011	Los Premios 40 Principales	"Best Mexican Act"	Nominated
2011	Lo Nuestro Awards	"Best Group or Duo"	Nominated
2012
2012	Kids' Choice Awards Mexico	"Favourite Latino Group/Duo"	Nominated
2013
2013	Billboard Latin Music Awards	"Latin Marketing Award: Best TV Campaign" (Move to the Beat - London 2012 - Coca-Cola with Universal Music - Belanova)	Won
