= Dulce Beat =

Studio album by Belanova
- Released: 22 June 2005 (Mexico and Latin America); 8 March 2006 (US); 26 March 2006 (Spain & US)
- Studio: Mondo Mix, Buenos Aires, Argentina, and Cubo Studio, Guadalajara, Mexico
- Genre: Synth-pop; electropop
- Label: Universal
- Producer: Cachorro López

Belanova chronology
Cocktail (2003)	Dulce Beat (2005)	Dulce Beat Live (2006)

Singles from Dulce Beat
- 1. "Me Pregunto" Released: 11 May 2005; 2. "Por Ti" Released: 24 October 2005; 3. "Rosa Pastel" Released: 2 April 2006; 4. "Niño" Released: 4 October 2006

Professional ratings
Review scores
Source	Rating
Rolling Stone Mexico	4/5 stars
AllMusic	3.5/5 stars

Dulce Beat (Spanish for "Sweet Beat") is the second studio album by Mexican electropop band Belanova, released in Mexico on 22 June 2005. The album was recorded between 2004 and 2005 in Buenos Aires, Argentina, and Guadalajara, Mexico, and was produced by Cachorro López. All songs were written by the band's lead singer, Denisse Guerrero.

The album was promoted through radio appearances and concert performances in Argentina, Chile, and the United States, including a joint concert with Mach and Daddy in Los Angeles. Dulce Beat became Belanova's most commercially successful album, achieving double platinum certification in Mexico and reaching number one the country. In 2006, it was reissued internationally as Dulce Beat 2.0 in several countries, including Chile, Spain, Argentina, and the US.

Several singles from the album achieved significant chart success. "Me Pregunto" and "Por Ti" became the band's second and third consecutive number-one singles in Mexico, respectively, while "Rosa Pastel" and "Niño" reached the top five. "Rosa Pastel" remained on the charts for almost fifty weeks in the mid-2000s, and experienced renewed popularity as a viral song on TikTok in 2023, reaching the top 10 of Billboard Mexico Songs. On August 12, 2006, E! Latin America aired a television special featuring Belanova, including interviews and behind-the-scenes footage documenting the making of the album.

== Dulce Beat 2.0 ==
A new edition of the album, entitled Dulce Beat 2.0, was released in Mexico on June 5, 2006, and in the United States on August 1. In Mexico, the re-issue debuted at number-three on the album charts and spent several weeks inside the top ten.

== Track listing ==
All tracks by Belanova

Dulce Beat

No.	Title	Length
1.	"Niño" ("Boy")	3:29
2.	"Rosa Pastel" ("Pastel Pink")	3:06
3.	"Soñar" ("To Dream")	3:52
4.	"Mírame" ("Look At Me")	3:04
5.	"Miedo" ("Fear")	3:33
6.	"Escena Final" ("Final Scene")	3:25
7.	"Por Ti" ("For You")	3:35
8.	"Tal Vez" ("Perhaps")	2:58
9.	"Me Pregunto" ("I Wonder")	3:06
10.	"Sexy"	3:04
11.	"Te Quedas o Te Vas" ("Are You Staying Or Are You Going")	3:42

Dulce Beat 2.0
(Released 5 June 2006 in Mexico and 1 August 2006 in the United States)

- CD1

Same as above, except the track 'Te Quedas o Te Vas', which is a different vocal version.

- CD2
1. "Me Pregunto" [Acoustic Version] – 3:58
2. "Por Ti" [Acoustic Version] – 4:08
3. "Suele Pasar" [Acoustic Version] – 3:46
4. "Tus Ojos" [Mijangos House Mix] – 4:46
5. "Me Pregunto" [Imazué Latin Mix] – 4:55
6. "Por Ti" [Jose Spinnin's Peak Hour Reconstruction] – 6:21
7. "Por Ti" [Sound Art Remix] – 4:34
8. "Enhanced Section":
  - "Me Pregunto" (Video)
  - "Por Ti" (Video)

Acoustic Versions of the songs included on the CD2 of Dulce Beat 2.0 were produced by Belanova

== Personnel ==
- Edgar Huerta - Keyboards, Synths & Beats
- Ricardo Arreola – guitar, bajo sexto
- Denisse Guerrero – vocals
- Cachorro López – arranger, producer, musical direction
- Andres Mijangos – producer, mastering, mixing, program assistant
- Sebastián Schon – guitar, engineer, choir arrangement
- Patricio Villarejo – cello
- Production: Cachorro López
- Recording & Mixing: Mondo Mix, Buenos Aires, Argentina.
- Record Engineer: Sebastián Schon
- Second Engineer: Damián Nava
- Mixed by Cesar Sogbe
- Musical Direction: Cachorro López
- Co-Produced by Andres Mijangos & Belanova
- Additional Programming: Andres Mijangos
- Additional Vocals on "Te Quedas o Te Vas": Israel Ulloa
- Guitars: Ganimedes "Gani"
- Record Engineer: Juan Antonio Paez
- Mixed by Juan Antonio Paez & Andres Mijangos
- Mastered by José Blanco in Master House Studios, Miami, Florida.
- Art Direction and Design: Pico Adworks
- Photography: Ricardo Trabulsi.

== Charts ==
Chart (2005)	Peak position
Mexican Albums Chart	1
U.S. Billboard Top Latin Albums	59
U.S. Billboard Top Electronic Albums	10
U.S. Billboard Top Heatseekers	12

== Sales and certifications ==
Region	Certification	Certified units/sales
Mexico (AMPROFON)	2× Platinum	200,000^{^}
^{^} Shipments figures based on certification alone.

== Release history ==
Release dates and formats for Dulce Beat
Region	Date	Format(s)	Label	Catalogue
Latin America	22 June 2006	CD; digital download	Universal	Unknown
United States	8 March 2006	CD; digital download	Universal	Unknown
Spain	26 March 2006	CD; digital download	Universal	Unknown
Mexico	2 October 2023	LP (Pink vinyl)	Universal; UM^{e}	00602455933416
