= One, Two, Three, Go! =

"One, Two, Three, Go! (1, 2, 3, Go!)"

Single by Belanova

from the album Fantasía Pop
- Language: Spanish
- Released: May 12, 2008 (Mexican radio)
- Recorded: 2007
- Genre: Pop rock; synthpop; electronic rock
- Length: 2:45
- Label: UML
- Producer: Cachorro López

Belanova singles chronology
"Cada Que..." (2007)	"One, Two, Three, Go! (1, 2, 3, Go!)" (2008)	"Paso El Tiempo" (2008)

One, Two, Three, Go! (1, 2, 3, Go!) is the third international single and fourth single in Mexico from Belanova's third studio album, Fantasía Pop. The song was announced as a single by Universal Music México in mid-April 2008 and was finally sent out to radio stations in Mexico on May 12, 2008. It was also featured as the free "Single of the Week" on iTunes for the week of July 28, 2008. The music video won an MTV Award at Los Premios MTV Latinoamérica 2008 for "Video of the Year".

== Music video ==
The music video was filmed on June 7, 2008 in Mexico City, during a break from their Fantasía Pop tour around the United States. The video features the members of Belanova judging a talent competition, in which they also play the contestants. The music video premiered on June 24, 2008 on Telehit, MTV and Exa TV.

== Charts ==
Chart (2008)	Peak position
Chile (EFE)	8
Mexico (Monitor Latino)	3
Venezuela (Record Report)	3
