= Por ti (song) =

"Por Ti"

Single by Belanova

from the album Dulce Beat
- Released: 24 October 2005
- Recorded: 2005
- Genre: Electropop
- Length: 3:35
- Label: Universal México
- Songwriters: Guerrero, Denisse; Huerta, Edgar A. López, Cachorro; Arreola, Ricardo

Belanova singles chronology
"Me Pregunto" (2004)	"Por Ti" (2005)	"Rosa Pastel" (2006)

"Por Ti" (For You) is the second single from the album Dulce Beat by the Mexican electropop band Belanova.

The song was released on Mexican radio in October 2005. "Por Ti" became a huge hit for the band and one of the most popular songs of the year. The music video enjoyed long airplay, remaining on the charts until June 2006.

== Music video ==
The music video for the single was directed by Oliver Castro and was filmed in Mexico City. It premiered on November 1, 2005, and in its main run managed to reach number one on multiple charts, including the MTV video charts, Telehit's Top Ten, VH1's Top 20 and TV Azteca's Top Ten.

The video managed to break the record for the most consecutive weeks on the MTV Mexico Top 20 Charts, after spending 29 weeks at number one.

== Track listing ==
Sampler Remixes Enhanced CD single

1. Por ti (Dj Mosca Remix) – 4:29
2. Por ti (Dj B-Fe to Remix) – 4:24
3. Por ti (Dj Kito Dance Mix) – 6:38
4. Por ti (Vetiver Bong Vs Rigoberto) – 3:49
5. Por ti (Panorama Studio Rmx) – 7:03
6. Por ti (Huss Rmx) – 7:03
7. Por ti (The Dust Technno Trance Mix) – 6:05
8. Por ti (Jose Spinnin's Peak Hour Reconstruction) – 6:21
9. Por ti (Alejandro Perez Remix) – 5:52
10. Por ti (The Beat Dust Remake) – 4:16
11. Por ti (Sound Art Remix) – 4:34
12. Enhanced Section:
  - Info
  - Belanova Biography
  - Music Player
  - Por ti (Video)
  - Photo gallery
  - Bonus Material (Web Links, Credits)

== Charts ==
Chart (2006)	Peak
US Hot Latin Songs (Billboard)	37
US Latin Pop Airplay (Billboard)	11
US Hot Dance Music/Club Play (Billboard)	25
US Tropical Airplay (Billboard)	34
