= Cocktail (album) =

Studio album by Belanova
- Released: 14 February 2003 (Mexico)
- Recorded: 2002
- Genre: Electronica; ambient house; nu-disco; deep house; indie pop
- Length: 43:15
- Label: Universal; Virus
- Producer: Belanova; Alex Midi Ortega

Belanova chronology
Cocktail (2003)	Dulce Beat (2005)

Singles from Cocktail
- 1. "Tus Ojos" Released: 6 February 2003; 2. "Suele Pasar" Released: 21 December 2003; 3. "Aún Así Te Vas" Released: 28 June 2004; 4. "Y..." Released: 15 July 2004

Cocktail is the debut album of Mexican electropop band Belanova. The album was recorded in Mexico City in 2002 and released on 14 February 2003 with very little promotion. Some Mexican radio stations started adding the first single, "Tus Ojos" to their playlists in the spring of 2003. By the summer of that year the album entered the charts in Mexico, reaching its peak position of #5 and #3 on the Mexican Latin Albums Chart. The band embarked on a 100-concert tour across the country and the album finally reached Gold status (for selling 50,000 copies) after three official singles. The Mexican edition of Rolling Stone named the album, Cocktail, one of the best five albums of 2003.

In 2005 the album was re-issued on reduced priced collections by Universal Music Mexico and because of this the sales of the album increased considerably, re-entering on the Mexican Top 100 Albums at seventy-nine and peaking at fifty-four after a few weeks. The album has been re-issued on Universal Music's slide-pack collections, making it the first time that the album has been available outside of Mexico.

== Reception ==
Professional ratings
Review scores
Source	Rating
AllMusic	2.5/5 stars

AllMusic noted the album as fusing "infectious melodies with disco guitar licks and electro beats to produce an eclectic sound encompassing Latino, synth pop, and techno."

== Track listing ==
No.	Title	Length
1.	"Barco de Papel" ("Paper Boat")	4:50
2.	"Aún Así Te Vas" ("Still You Leave")	4:13
3.	"What A Shame"	5:03
4.	"Fragilidad" ("Fragility")	3:44
5.	"Tranquilo" ("Calm")	3:55
6.	"Y..." ("And...")	4:00
7.	"Apaga la Luz" ("Turn Off the Light")	4:00
8.	"Tus Ojos" ("Your Eyes")	3:03
9.	"Suele Pasar" ("Tends to Happen")	3:08
10.	"Arena" ("Sand")	7:07

== Credits ==
- Production: Belanova & Alex Midi Ortega in Virus Studios, Mexico
- Executive production: Alex Midi Ortega and Alex Enriquez
- Additional mix: Rodolfo Vazquez in Manu Studios, Mexico
- Mixing assistant: Mariano Armendáriz
- Mastered by Ron Boustead in Precision Mastering, Hollywood, California
- Scratches: Israel Sosa "DJ Pepster" [Track 2]
- Acoustic guitar: Sergio Mendrigal [Track 8], Nomo [Tracks 4 & 9]
- Art direction and design: Raul Rodrigo
- Photography: Fernando Aceves
- Make-up: Silvia García Barragán
