= More Colours! =

Remix album by The Pinker Tones
- Released: 21 August 2007
- Genre: Indie pop, Alternative
- Label: Outstanding Records

The Pinker Tones chronology
The Million Colour Revolution (2006)	More Colours! (2007)	Wild Animals (2008)

More Colours! or better known as More Colours!: The Million Colour Revolution Revisited Twice is a double album by The Pinker Tones, released in 2007. It consists mostly of remixes from The Million Colour Revolution. In the second disc contains 3 bonus tracks which is from the first album, The BCN Connection.

== Track listing ==
Disc 1

1. "Señoras y Señores" - Remix by Professor Manso
2. "Welcome to TMCR" - Remix by Alex Acosta (Mojo Project)
3. "Karma Hunters" - Remix by Mexican Institute of Sound
4. "Beyond Nostalgia" - Remix by Kassin (The+2's)
5. "L'Heros" - Remix by Torpedo Boyz
6. "Sonido Total (DJ Niño's Million Guitar Remix) " - Remix by TPT & DJ Niño
7. "Piccolissima Descarga" - Remix by El Miku
8. "In Pea We Nuts" - Cover by TPT
9. "Pink Freud" - Remix by Dyko
10. "Many Years Ago" - Remix by DJ Niño
11. "Love Tape vs Medium Waves" - Mash-up by TPT
12. "Mojo Moog" - Remix by The Submarines
13. "Pinkerland Becaina" - Remix by Gigi el Amoroso
14. "Gone, Go On" - Remix by Pecker
15. "Maybe Next Saturday" - Cover by Juzz
16. "TMCR Grand Finale" - Cover by EllzaPoppinzz

Bonus tracks

1. "Love Tape" - Live acoustic cover @ KCRW by TPT
2. "TMCR Grand Finale" - Remix by Galáctico
3. "Sonido Total" - Remix by Capri

Disc 2

1. "Señoras y Señores" · Remix by Mister Furia
2. "Welcome to TMCR" · Remix by Alex Acosta (Mojo Project)
3. "Karma Hunters" · Remix by DJ Niño
4. "Beyond Nostalgia" · Remix by Daniel Melero
5. "L'Heros" · Remix by Danbeat
6. "Sonido Total" · Remix by Concorde Music Club
7. "Piccolissima Descarga" · Acapella cover by TPT
8. "In Pea We Nuts" · Remix by Panóptica (Nortec Collective)
9. "Pink Freud" · Remix by Moreno Veloso, A. Kassim, Domenico L.
10. "Many Years Ago" · Remix by Professor Manso
11. "Love Tape" · Remix by Jeff Automatic
12. "Mojo Moog" · Remix by Styrofoam
13. "Pinkerland Becaina vs Welcome to TMCR" · Mash-up remix by TPT
14. "Gone, Go On" · Remix by Z Bosio (Soda Estéreo) & And Body (Simon)
15. "Maybe Next Saturday" · Remix by PJ Rose
16. "TMCR Grand Finale" · Remix by Kinky

Bonus tracks

1. "Viva la Juventud" · Remix by TPT
2. "One of Them (Readymade Jazz Exercise)" · Remix by Konishi Yasuharu
3. "Mais Pourquois? (BCN Mix)" · (Remix by Ursula 1000)
