= FIFA 11 =

2010 video game

- British and Irish cover featuring Real Madrid's Kaká and Manchester United's Wayne Rooney
- Developers: EA Canada; Exient Entertainment (DS); EA Romania (iOS); Distinctive Developments (mobile)
- Publisher: EA Sports
- Producers: David Rutter; Ian Jarvis; Andrew Wilson
- Series: FIFA
- Platforms: PC: Windows; Consoles: PlayStation 2 PlayStation 3 Wii Xbox 360; Handhelds and mobile: iOS Nintendo DS PlayStation Portable Blackberry App World Java ME
- Release: NA: September 28, 2010; AU: September 30, 2010; EU: October 1, 2010; NA: October 4, 2010 (Wii)
- Genre: Sports
- Modes: Single-player, multiplayer

FIFA 11, titled FIFA Soccer 11 in North America, is a football simulation video game developed by EA Canada and published by Electronic Arts worldwide under the EA Sports label. It was released on 28 September 2010 in North America, 30 September 2010 in Australia, and 1 October 2010 in Europe for all platforms, except the Wii and Nintendo DS. The Wii version was released on 1 October 2010 in North America and Europe and the DS version on 8 October 2010. The Windows version of FIFA 11 is the first in the series to use the same game engine as the PlayStation 3 and Xbox 360 versions. The game received positive reviews and was awarded 'Sports Game of the Year' at the Golden Joystick Awards after a record-breaking 2.05 million votes. This was the last FIFA title to be released for the Nintendo DS.

== New features ==
- Next Gen Gameplay Engine (PC): The PC version of the game now uses the same game engine as the PlayStation 3 and Xbox 360 versions. Also, the "Two Button" control system, introduced in the 2010 FIFA World Cup game has carried through to FIFA 11, making it ideal for novices and new players to the series.
- FIFA World (PC): This will allow the player to customize their online avatar, compete with players from all over the world and fight for positions on the leaderboard.
- PC Improvements: Next-gen menu presentation is used. Manager mode from console version of FIFA 10 has been imported with some improvements. Be a pro seasons have been completely revamped. There is a new practice arena which can be accessed when exiting a game mode. There is a new 5 v 5 online team play and Pro Club Championship. Further, there is the all new Virtual Pro game mode. Players can create their game face on the official web site then download it and apply it to their virtual pro in game. 360° dribbling is also featured along with LAN play. Players can also create tactics themselves.
- Pro Passing (PS3, Xbox 360): is a new passing system where the gamer's own accuracy with the control pad, as well as the situation and skills of the players on the pitch, determines the accuracy of each pass.
- Creation Centre (PS3, Xbox 360): is a new web-based application which allows the user to create material to download to their console and share with their friends. Created teams, names, kits, and players can be customised and players can be edited in a more in-depth way than before. Create a player by choosing his appearance, accessories and attributes. You may also create players and edit squads on the console itself, but to create a team you must use the Creation Centre web-based application.

An in-game screenshot highlighting the improved Career Mode

- Career Mode (PS3, Xbox 360, PS2, PSP, NDS): "Be a Pro Mode" and "Manager Mode" have been merged into the new "Career Mode", where the player can choose to be a player, manager, or player-manager for over 15 seasons. Many improvements have been made to Career Mode, one being that when signing new players, the user will have to agree to a transfer fee with the club, as well as other personal demands from the player; the club could also agree a fee with two teams for a player. The board of a club can decide to give the manager a contract extension or not; this will depend on certain objectives being met, or if they feel that the user has potential as a manager. The manager reputation rating is still in the game and will go up or down depending on your efforts. Regular emails will appear from the coach telling the user about player growth, and if a player is gaining or losing overall rating, the coach will also tell the user about players that are hitting form and will suggest the user include them in the starting line up for the next match, or give them a little more responsibility. On the player growth screen, the user will also get comments from the coach, such as "has reached his potential", "isn't going to grow anymore", or "could develop quickly if given game time." A new budget allocator has also been implemented, where the player can adjust the slider to whatever they desire, whether it will be an 80/20 split with £50 million to spend and £200K wage budget, or a 60/40 split, where that may be £40 million to spend and £250K wage budget. This gives some flexibility if the user is trying to buy specific players but does not have the wages to cover it, or does not need the wages and wants more free cash. There is a limit, however; when doing this, the user will get the notification that this is only available three times per season, so the player must make their decisions wisely. It is also now possible to view results and standings from other leagues around the world, following a similar feature that was on the official 2010 FIFA World Cup game. It still is not possible to manage an international team.
- Street Football (Wii): Players can now play 5 vs. 5 street football, as well as the traditional 11 vs. 11. Each street player has a distinctive style of play with unique abilities to match.
- Goalkeeper Intelligence (All Platforms): Goalkeepers now have more urgency and better perception of where to intercept loose balls, resulting in a more responsive and powerful rushing system. Goalkeepers are now more agile and can make more impressive saves. New animation warping technology provides game-realistic goalkeeper positioning and momentum, resulting in more varied scoring opportunities.
- Be a Goalkeeper (PS3, Xbox 360, PS2, PSP): EA Sports released a FIFA 11 trailer with the slogan "We Are 11." The trailer confirmed that it's possible to play as a goalkeeper in FIFA 11, and it is also possible to play 11 vs. 11 online matches. The player can choose perform realistic actions such as diving and jumping to prevent a goal scored by the opposition.
- Manual Leaderboard: It has been confirmed that there will be a separate leaderboard this year for players that use the manual control setup.
- Improved Celebrations (PS3, Xbox 360): Celebrations will now use the in-game camera rather than separate cutscenes. It is also confirmed that teammates can now join in celebrations. Also, only more skilled or acrobatic players can perform the more acrobatic celebrations, such as a back flip. FIFA 11 also includes players' signature celebrations, which they can perform with a simple push of a button.
- 360° Dribbling (PS3, Xbox 360, PC): True 360° dribbling system will provide finer dribbling control, enabling players to find space between defenders that not possible before. Players will also have the opportunity to perform a number of tricks and skills, with the push of certain controls. Footballers with a higher "skill" star rating (such as Ronaldinho, Cristiano Ronaldo, Lionel Messi and Kaka), will be able to make more impressive skills such as a Rainbow Flick.

FIFA 11 features 31 licensed leagues (including second-divisions, and so on), from 24 countries around the world, as well as 39 national teams.

== iOS version ==
FIFA 11 for Apple iOS devices features improved graphics and compatibility with the iPhone 4 and 4th generation iPod Touch's retina displays. The game is compatible with iPhone 4, iPhone 3GS, 3rd and 4th generation iPod touch, and a recent version came out for the iPad. It is still plagued with crashes, particularly since the upgrade to iOS 5.0, which means it cannot run on current iPads.

== Demo ==
A FIFA 11 demo was released for PS3, Xbox 360 and PC on 15 September 2010. The demo features Chelsea, Barcelona, Real Madrid, Juventus, Bayer Leverkusen and Lyon, although Arsenal can be unlocked on the PS3 and Xbox 360 by playing FIFA Superstars on Facebook and winning 5 matches on Superstars. The stadium for the demo is Real Madrid's home stadium, Santiago Bernabéu, but the Emirates Stadium can also be unlocked through FIFA Superstars. It will be unlocked after 10 games on Superstars. Reciprocally, by playing the FIFA 11 demo, users can earn rewards for their FIFA Superstars team.

== Reception ==
Reception

Aggregate score
Aggregator	Score
Metacritic	88%

Review scores
Publication	Score
GamesMaster	94%
GameSpot	9.0/10
IGN	8.5/10
PlayStation Official Magazine – UK	10/10
IGN UK	9.5/10

FIFA 11 has been positively received with IGN UK rating it 9.5 out of 10 and Official PlayStation Magazine (UK) rating it a 10/10, the first game in the series to be given a full score. Eurogamer rated it 8/10 summing up, "At its best FIFA 11 is enormous fun and brilliantly engineered, but in its battle to be more varied and realistic it has lost some of its momentum, and off the pitch returns are starting to diminish too".

During the 14th Annual Interactive Achievement Awards, the Academy of Interactive Arts & Sciences awarded FIFA 11 with "Sports Game of the Year".

As of October 2011, 16 million copies of the game have been sold across all platforms.

== Commentaries ==
- In PS3, Xbox 360 and PC version: Martin Tyler and Andy Gray
- In PS2, PSP, Wii, Android and iOS version: Clive Tyldesley and Andy Gray
- In DS version: Clive Tyldesley and Andy Townsend (only)

== Ultimate Team ==
Following on from previous FIFA games, FIFA 11 Ultimate Team was released on PS3 and Xbox 360 on 3 November 2010. It is available for free download from the PlayStation Store or Xbox Live Marketplace. In the game itself, players purchase packs of cards with in-game money. These packs contain random players and other items, such as balls and kits, and players have to win football matches in order to earn coins, to purchase new players. There are other ways to make money, such as buying players and other items cheaply and selling them on for a higher price. Also, with Microsoft points on the Xbox 360 you can buy packs of silver or gold players, staff and items. Returning users to Ultimate Team receive two complimentary Gold packs. It has been praised for its creativity, and likeness to eBay, in that it has live auctions, where player items needed from other players.

This has also been likened to the real life Football market, where other managers are constantly trying to outbid each other for the best players and staff. Also, people could play their friends in this new friend mode. Players can be found in packs according to their real life transfers, for example the Fernando Torres Chelsea card appeared in packs after he was transferred from Liverpool or the Edin Dzeko transfer from Wolfsburg to Man City. These updates can be useful for the chemistry side of the game.

== Music ==
The following songs are featured in FIFA 11 (as listed in game credits):

- "Can't Sleep" – Adrian Lux
- "1977" – Ana Tijoux
- "Odessa" – Caribou
- "Trick Pony" – Charlotte Gainsbourg
- "El Bombo (Toquemen El Bombo)" – Choc Quib Town
- "Don't Turn the Lights On" – Chromeo
- "Wonder" – Dan Black
- ":O" – Dapuntobeat
- "It Only Takes One Night" – Dum Dum Girls
- "W.A.R.R.I.O.R." – Ebony Bones
- "Rhinestone Eyes" – Gorillaz
- "Paper Romance" – Groove Armada
- "Controller" – Howl
- "Around Us" – Jonsi
- "White Picket Fences" – Jump Jump Dance Dance
- "Ace of Hz" – Ladytron
- "I Can Change" – LCD Soundsystem
- "Blackout" – Linkin Park
- "Sun In My Pocket" – Locnville
- "Snowflake" – Malachai
- "El Tigeraso" – Maluca
- "Record Collection" – Mark Ronson featuring Simon Le Bon and Wiley
- "Splitting the Atom" – Massive Attack
- "Flash Delirium" – MGMT
- "Flashbacks" – Ram Di Dam [sv]
- "Fire With Fire" – Scissor Sisters
- "Tighten Up" – The Black Keys
- "Sampleame" – The Pinker Tones
- "Efémera" – Tulipa
- "I Can Talk" – Two Door Cinema Club
- "Rules Don't Stop" – We Are Scientists
- "O.N.E." – Yeasayer
- "The Space Ahead" – Zémaria

== See also ==
- Pro Evolution Soccer 2011
