= Yasmin Deliz =

American singer

- Also known as: Queenz, La Pechoca
- Born: June 2, 1987 (age 39)
- Origin: Queens, New York City, U.S.
- Genres: R&B; reggaeton; new-age
- Occupations: Singer; actress

Yasmin Deliz (born June 2, 1987) is an American singer and actress. She is best known for her starring role in Next Day Air and her work as co-host on mun2's music video countdown show Vivo and reality television show The Chicas Project.

== Career ==
In 2006, Deliz was offered a deal on Mun2 for two shows Deliz started working as a VJ on the show "Vivo" for Universo, a Latin music television network.

In January 2007, she teamed up with fellow VJ, Crash in mun2's reality show The Chicas Project. The show is based on two close friends of different styles and backgrounds that are sent out on adventures each week, where they learn new talents like how to surf, host events, or perform outrageous stunts like skydiving. Keeping with the mission of mun2, no matter what they do, the chicas always try to keep themselves and their identity rooted in their Latin background. The show is premiered its 4th season on July 9. Deja The Great then introduced Deliz to long-time friend Director Benny Boom (Next Day Air) on the set of Brooke Valentine's video shoot Dope Girl featuring Pimp C directed by Boom which Deliz featured in.

She appeared in as the main girl in New Kids on the Block's 2008 music video Single, which also features Ne-Yo.

She made her film debut as Chita in the 2009 film Next Day Air alongside Donald Faison, Mike Epps, Omari Hardwick and Wood Harris.

== Filmography ==
Film
Year	Film	Role	Notes
2009	Next Day Air	Chita	Film debut
2009	Primos	Tall Sexy Woman	
2013	White T.	Megan	
Television
Year	Title	Role	Notes
2006	Vivo	Hostress/Herself	
2007–2009	The Chicas Project	Herself	
2009	Cougar Town	Nezzie	2 episodes
