= List of Larrymania episodes =

Larrymania is an American reality television series that premiered on October 7, 2012 on Universo. The series follows Mexican-American singer Larry Hernandez as he navigates through his musical career and juggles family life.

On May 9, 2019, Telemundo announced that the series has been renewed for an eighth season. The season premiered on September 15, 2019.

== Series overview ==
Season	Episodes	Originally released	
Season	Episodes	First released	Last released
1	10	October 7, 2012	December 9, 2012
2	15	August 18, 2013	December 1, 2013
3	14	May 4, 2014	August 17, 2014
4	15	June 14, 2015	September 27, 2015
5	16	July 17, 2016	January 8, 2017
6	15	November 5, 2017	March 4, 2018
7	15	September 30, 2018	January 27, 2019
8	15	September 15, 2019	January 26, 2020

== Episodes ==
=== Season 1 (2012) ===
No. overall	No. in season	Title	Original release date
1	1	"La familia Hernández"	October 7, 2012
2	2	"Mexico lindo y querido"	October 14, 2012
3	3	"El R&R no existe"	October 21, 2012
4	4	"Larry en la ciudad"	October 28, 2012
5	5	"Quiero ser igual a ti"	November 4, 2012
6	6	"Hijo de mami"	November 11, 2012
7	7	"Como ella, no hay dos"	November 18, 2012
8	8	"Larry, la estrella"	November 25, 2012
9	9	"En todas partes"	December 2, 2012
10	10	"Lo mejor de la temporada 1"	December 9, 2012

=== Season 2 (2013) ===
No. overall	No. in season	Title	Original release date
11	1	"Party Time in Culiacán"	August 18, 2013
12	2	"El Palenque"	August 25, 2013
13	3	"El Señor de los Cielos"	September 8, 2013
14	4	"Ready for some action?"	September 15, 2013
15	5	"One Like Mom"	September 22, 2013
16	6	"Keep the Faith"	September 29, 2013
17	7	"Kid at Heart"	October 6, 2013
18	8	"Estación Obismo, My Home"	October 13, 2013
19	9	"Cuando El Río Suena..."	October 20, 2013
20	10	"Back in the Big Apple"	October 27, 2013
21	11	"Out in the Wild"	November 3, 2013
22	12	"Sin City"	November 10, 2013
23	13	"All the Women in my Life"	November 17, 2013
24	14	"Friends, Family & Fate"	November 24, 2013
25	15	"Keys to the City"	December 1, 2013

=== Season 3 (2014) ===
No. overall	No. in season	Title	Original release date
26	1	"El Último Baile"	May 4, 2014
27	2	"Home Sweet Home"	May 11, 2014
28	3	"Santa is Here"	May 18, 2014
29	4	"It's a Girl"	June 1, 2014
30	5	"Ojos que no ven..."	June 8, 2014
31	6	"Girls Night Out"	June 15, 2014
32	7	"Be My Valentine"	June 22, 2014
33	8	"Mini Honeymoon in Mazatlán"	June 29, 2014
34	9	"No Fear"	July 13, 2014
35	10	"Tequila From Hell"	July 20, 2014
36	11	"Good Morning Regret"	July 27, 2014
37	12	"Boys Gone Wild"	August 3, 2014
38	13	"Surprise, Surprise"	August 10, 2014
39	14	"Lo Mejor de la Temporada"	August 17, 2014

=== Season 4 (2015) ===
No. overall	No. in season	Title	Original release date
40	1	"Larry por libre"	June 14, 2015
41	2	"De regreso en Sinaloa"	June 21, 2015
42	3	"Fiesta al estilo Larry"	June 28, 2015
43	4	"Larry, el rebelde"	July 5, 2015
44	5	"Sorpresa, sorpresa"	July 12, 2015
45	6	"En la ruta, al estilo Larry"	July 19, 2015
46	7	"Europa, a la carga"	July 26, 2015
47	8	"Pride sinaolense"	August 2, 2015
48	9	"Romance en Francia"	August 9, 2015
49	10	"De-tour de Francia"	August 16, 2015
50	11	"Los Larrymaniacos"	August 23, 2015
51	12	"En la ruta de nuevo"	August 30, 2015
52	13	"Aloha fila Hernández"	September 6, 2015
53	14	"La familia primero"	September 20, 2015
54	15	"Lo mejor de la temporada 4"	September 27, 2015

=== Season 5 (2016–17) ===
No. overall	No. in season	Title	Original release date	U.S. viewers (millions)
55	1	"Un nuevo comienzo"	July 17, 2016	0.11
56	2	"Antes de la tormenta"	July 24, 2016	N/A
57	3	"Sigo por mi gente"	July 31, 2016	N/A
58	4	"Viaje familiar"	August 14, 2016	0.13
59	5	"Adrenalina de Mammoth"	August 21, 2016	0.10
60	6	"Ni un segundo de aburrimiento"	August 28, 2016	N/A
61	7	"Buenas Acciones"	September 4, 2016	0.08
62	8	"Bakersfield"	September 11, 2016	N/A
63	9	"Romance en la Bahía"	September 18, 2016	N/A
64	10	"La Sorpresa Golden Gate"	September 25, 2016	N/A
65	11	"Salida con los cuates"	November 27, 2016	0.14
66	12	"Kenia, la empresaria"	December 4, 2016	0.14
67	13	"Other side of the border"	December 11, 2016	0.15
68	14	"Giving back"	December 18, 2016	0.11
69	15	"This is Home (Part 1)"	January 1, 2017	0.16
70	16	"This is Home (Part 2)"	January 8, 2017	0.14

=== Season 6 (2017–18) ===
No. overall	No. in season	Title	Original release date	U.S. viewers (millions)
71	1	"¿Al fin libre?"	November 5, 2017	0.26
After 6 years in prison, Freddy is finally free and an emotional reunion takes place. The legal process against Larry seems to be coming to an end, but a new edge arises.
72	2	"¿Unidos para siempre?"	November 12, 2017	0.23
Larry is going to record a duet with Lupillo Rivera and it is more difficult than expected. Kenia asks Larry to follow up with his lawyer and a heated discussion ensues.
73	3	"Verifiquemos la realidad"	November 19, 2017	0.17
Larry and his family travel to Phoenix to celebrate his 40th birthday. Kenia plans to surprise Larry with the help of Manuela and Yesenia, while Larry learns how the lawyer advances.
74	4	"Las cuatro décadas"	November 26, 2017	0.21
Larry is ready to celebrate his 40th birthday with a special concert at the Celebrity Theater. Carlos Yorvick and Chiquis Rivera will accompany him on stage.
75	5	"La fuerza de la insinuación"	December 3, 2017	0.12
Larry loves to please Manuela with surprises. Larry invites his idol, Ramón Ayala, for a family reunion. Kenya calls a hypnotist to help Larry overcome his stage fright.
76	6	"Esto es cosa de diva"	December 10, 2017	0.18
Larry prepares a surprise for Kenia, on her birthday. While Larry is away, Kenia has a plan. When she and the girls are about to enjoy a fun night, Larry arrives.
77	7	"El ultimátum"	December 17, 2017	N/A
Kenia is in shock, when she discovers that her brother, Arturo is engaged. Tensions erupt with Larry and Kenia and she gives him an ultimatum.
78	8	"Escapada a Florida"	January 7, 2018	0.22
Days after the big discussion, Larry confirms his commitment to Kenya. Plan a trip to Florida to leave the problems behind. The adventure will begin in the Everglades.
79	9	"Las llaves de la familia"	January 14, 2018	0.25
An adventure in Key West ends in a conversation during lunch about the wedding date and a pre-nuptial agreement.
80	10	"Sonrojarse, brillar o reventar"	January 21, 2018	0.24
Things get out of control at Kenia's first makeup seminar upon arrival in Phoenix. Stress and fear of failing end in tears and angry words.
81	11	"Los niños viajan a New York"	January 28, 2018	0.21
Larry invites his children to New York for a trip while he works.
82	12	"Los Hernández en la ciudad"	February 11, 2018	0.18
Larry decides to take his son Sebastián to the recording studio to help him record his first song.
83	13	"¿Bebé a bordo?"	February 18, 2018	0.17
Larry prepares to have a great concert in Ontario with Roberto Tapia. Meanwhile, Kenia is worried about a possible pregnancy.
84	14	"Reunión en la frontera"	February 25, 2018	0.14
Larry and Kenia travel to the border between San Diego and Tijuana to meet Freddy. It's time to have the heart-to-heart talk they've been waiting for months.
85	15	"El amor está en el aire"	March 4, 2018	0.16
Larry and Kenia celebrate Dalary's baptism, but before, Kenia takes Larry on an exciting hot air balloon ride. On the day of the event they give a news that surprises everyone.

=== Season 7 (2018–19) ===
No. overall	No. in season	Title	Original release date	U.S. viewers (millions)
86	1	"La recuperación"	September 30, 2018	0.17
After the accident that changed his life, Larry faces his fears. He shares his experience of that day and explains how he had a second chance.
87	2	"Preparativos de boda"	October 7, 2018	0.12
Kenya dreams of having a great wedding and dieting. Larry worries about returning to the stage and recovering his smile. He undergoes the first part of a dental surgery.
88	3	"S.O.S ¡Boda!"	October 14, 2018	0.10
Kenia visualizes a classic and elegant wedding. But, Larry plans to enter on horseback, where tacos and enchiladas will be served.
89	4	"El vestido perfecto"	October 21, 2018	0.08
Kenia invites her mom and her friends to look for her wedding dress. Due to differences of opinion things get extremely chaotic.
90	5	"Groomzila"	October 28, 2018	0.14
Larry tries to impose his wedding style, increasing the stress between him and Kenia. He insists on making a traditional Mexican wedding and making a triumphal entrance on horseback, dressed in mariachi.
91	6	"Sueños rotos"	November 4, 2018	0.19
Larry and Kenia manage to agree and choose the wedding planner. After his long absence from the stage, Larry despairs to get the green light and join his fans.
92	7	"El gran día peligra"	November 18, 2018	0.15
Larry and Kenia are so worried about looking splendid, that they neglect various details for the wedding. The wedding organizer is forced to engage in a serious conversation with both.
93	8	"Una declaración"	November 25, 2018	0.11
After Tanairi's scolding, the wedding preparations begin again. Larry and Kenia travel to choose the flowers. Manuela, Lupita and Sebastián are with Kenia and she will leave everyone in shock.
94	9	"Cuentas claras"	December 2, 2018	N/A
Kenia and Larry get ready for their respective bachelor parties; however, when he demands to clarify the presence of strippers, a strong argument breaks out a few hours before the wedding.
95	10	"¡Aquí vamos Vegas!"	December 9, 2018	N/A
Kenia goes to her bachelorette party, while Larry discovers that being in charge of the house is more difficult than he thought.
96	11	"Todo se queda en Las Vegas"	December 16, 2018	0.08
Kenia's bachelorrete party is not what she imagined, but under the promise of keeping everything that happens secret, she decides to relax and have fun. When she gets home, she finds Larry very angry.
97	12	"Una cigüeña se asoma"	January 6, 2019	0.11
It's Larry's turn to travel to Texas to celebrate his bachelor party. Before leaving, Kenia decides to leave doubts about a possible pregnancy. The result could change the plans.
98	13	"El que ríe último…"	January 13, 2019	0.10
Larry wants to enjoy every moment of his stay in Texas; between wild animals, firearms, tanks and extreme activities.
99	14	"El regreso"	January 20, 2019	0.11
Just days before the big wedding, Larry and Kenia say yes, during an intimate and emotional civil wedding. They are days of many emotions for both, but he prepares for the meeting with his fans.
100	15	"El gran día"	January 27, 2019	0.21
Finally the most awaited day arrives. After years of talks and long wait, Kenia and Larry are ready to say yes, in front of family and loved ones.

=== Season 8 (2019) ===
No. overall	No. in season	Title	Original release date	U.S. viewers (millions)
101	1	"Bienvenidos a casa"	September 15, 2019	0.08
A massive remodeling at the Hernandez's house brings many disagreements between them. Larry returns to his vocalization classes and realizes that his return as a musician will not be easy.
102	2	"Borrón y cuenta nueva"	September 22, 2019	0.10
After 17 months of absence in the stages, Larry begins rehearsals with a new band of musicians and prepares for a great event, which will be a great step in his career.
103	3	"Guerra de unicornios"	September 29, 2019	N/A
With the launch of Kenia's makeup line, Dalary and Daleyza have the opportunity to be models for the campaign. In the process, a fight breaks out between everyone.
104	4	"La luna de miel"	October 6, 2019	N/A
To forget the chaos in the photo shoot, Larry surprises Kenia with the desired honeymoon trip to Mexico. The couple enjoys a great adventure that they will never forget.
105	5	"Miel y adrenalina"	October 13, 2019	N/A
During the romantic trip, Larry continues in search of adrenaline, while Kenia wants some peace and quiet.
106	6	"La cuenta regresiva"	October 20, 2019	0.07
Larry has his last rehearsal with his musicians for his great return to the stage and receives an unexpected visit, which completely changes one of the most important days of his life.
107	7	"Fiestas del Lago"	October 27, 2019	N/A
Larry is ready to meet his audience at the Fiestas del Lago, aware of the great change in his interpretation and musical style.
108	8	"Los padrinos"	November 3, 2019	0.11
Larry and Kenia travel to Mexicali to solve some businesses, but when they arrive they find an unpleasant surprise. The day improves when they enjoy an unforgettable afternoon with their daughters.
109	9	"Mi familia es número 1"	November 10, 2019	0.09
Larry and Kenia have not been home and the girls begin to feel the absence of their parents. To compensate for lost time, the couple decides to try a new family activity.
110	10	"Los Héroes"	November 17, 2019	0.11
The launch day of the Junior’s Foundation is here and Kenia wants everything to be perfect for the girls. Larry gets involved in every detail, the tension and the unforeseen do not wait.
111	11	"El reto"	December 1, 2019	N/A
Larry organizes a day of extreme activities to enjoy with his wife and friends. But he realizes that the challenges are too intense and Kenia once again panics.
112	12	"Hogar dulce hogar"	January 5, 2020	0.09
After so many years, Larry and his family return to Sinaloa. But unfortunately, not everything will be peace and happiness, since Larry will have to face a difficult situation that overwhelms him so much.
113	13	"Mis pueblos unidos"	January 12, 2020	0.07
Larry enjoys his stay in Mexico to the fullest and does a series of activities.
114	14	"En equipo"	January 19, 2020	0.06
After spending a few days sharing with the family, Larry is ready to return to work and prepares for his great concert at Plaza Mexico.
115	15	"El gran regreso"	January 26, 2020	0.10
After a long wait, meeting thousands of his fans not only represents the realization of one of Larry's dreams, but also the turning point for the future of his career.
