= Behold a Pale Horse =

Behold a Pale Horse may refer to:

- "Behold a pale horse", a phrase taken from the biblical Book of Revelation
- Behold a Pale Horse (film), 1964, directed by Fred Zinnemann
- Behold a Pale Horse, a 1991 book by Milton William Cooper
- Behold! A Pale Horse, a 2009 album by The Ghost and the Grace
- Behold, a Pale Horse, a 2013 album by Ebony Bones
- "Behold a Pale Horse", a song from the Halo 3 Original Soundtrack
- "Behold a Pale Horse", a song by Angels & Airwaves from the album Love: Part Two
- "Behold a Pale Horse", a song by Boogiemonsters from the album God Sound
- "Behold! a Pale Horse", a song by JPEGMAFIA from the album The Ghost-Pop Tape
- "Behold a Pale Horse", a song by $uicideboy$

== See also ==
- Pale horse (disambiguation)
