= Life in Stereo =

Life in Stereo may refer to:

- Life In Stereo, a blog by Jonathan Leong
- Life in Stereo (The Pinker Tones album), 2012
- Life in Stereo (Ryan Farish album) 2012
