= Modular (album) =

Studio album by The Pinker Tones
- Released: 29 June 2010
- Genre: Electronic, indie pop
- Length: 44:55
- Label: Nacional Records

The Pinker Tones chronology
Wild Animals (2008)	Modular (2010)	Life in Stereo (2012)

Professional ratings
Review scores
Source	Rating
AllMusic	4/5 stars

Modular is the fourth studio album by the Spanish electronic indie pop band The Pinker Tones. It was released in Europe on June 8, 2010, and in the United States and Mexico on 29 June 2010 through Nacional Records. Their single "Sampleame" was featured in EA Sports game, FIFA 11.

== Track listing ==
All tracks are written by The Pinker Tones

No.	Title	Length
1.	"Modular"	0:54
2.	"Estirado al Sol"	3:59
3.	"Sampleame"	3:36
4.	"Tokyo"	5:05
5.	"Invisible"	3:54
6.	"Con Mi Camara" (Modular Mix)	0:56
7.	"Polos Opuestos"	4:17
8.	"Invaders" (Modular Mix)	1:17
9.	"Game Boy Music"	2:33
10.	"Sabiduria Popular"	4:54
11.	"Viajes"	3:48
12.	"Un Dia Sin Numeros"	4:25
13.	"Pinkerland Vibes" (Modular Mix)	1:37
14.	"Friends Around the World"	3:40
Total length:		44:55
