= Larrymania =

- Genre: Reality
- Starring: Larry Hernandez; Kenia Ontiveros; Manuela Hernandez; Sebastian Hernandez; Daleyza Hernandez
- Country of origin: United States
- No. of seasons: 8
- No. of episodes: 115 (list of episodes)

Production
- Executive producers: Gloria Medel Solomons; Irune Ariztoy; Sebastián Jiménez
- Production company: Cinemat

Original release
- Network: Universo
- Release: October 7, 2012 – January 26, 2020

Larrymania is an American reality television series that premiered on October 7, 2012, on Universo. The series follows Mexican-American singer Larry Hernandez as he navigates through his musical career and juggles family life.

On May 9, 2019, Telemundo announced that the series has been renewed for an eighth season. The season premiered on September 15, 2019.

== Production ==
The series was announced at the 2012-2013 mun2 Upfront. Production for the third season began in February 2014. The series was renewed for a fifth season on February 3, 2016 with production beginning the month before. A sixth season was announced on August 27, 2017. On May 10, 2018, Telemundo announced that the series has been renewed for a seventh season. Season 7 premiered on September 30, 2018.

== Episodes ==
Season	Episodes	Originally released	
Season	Episodes	First released	Last released
1	10	October 7, 2012	December 9, 2012
2	15	August 18, 2013	December 1, 2013
3	14	May 4, 2014	August 17, 2014
4	15	June 14, 2015	September 27, 2015
5	16	July 17, 2016	January 8, 2017
6	15	November 5, 2017	March 4, 2018
7	15	September 30, 2018	January 27, 2019
8	15	September 15, 2019	January 26, 2020
