= Ebony Bones =

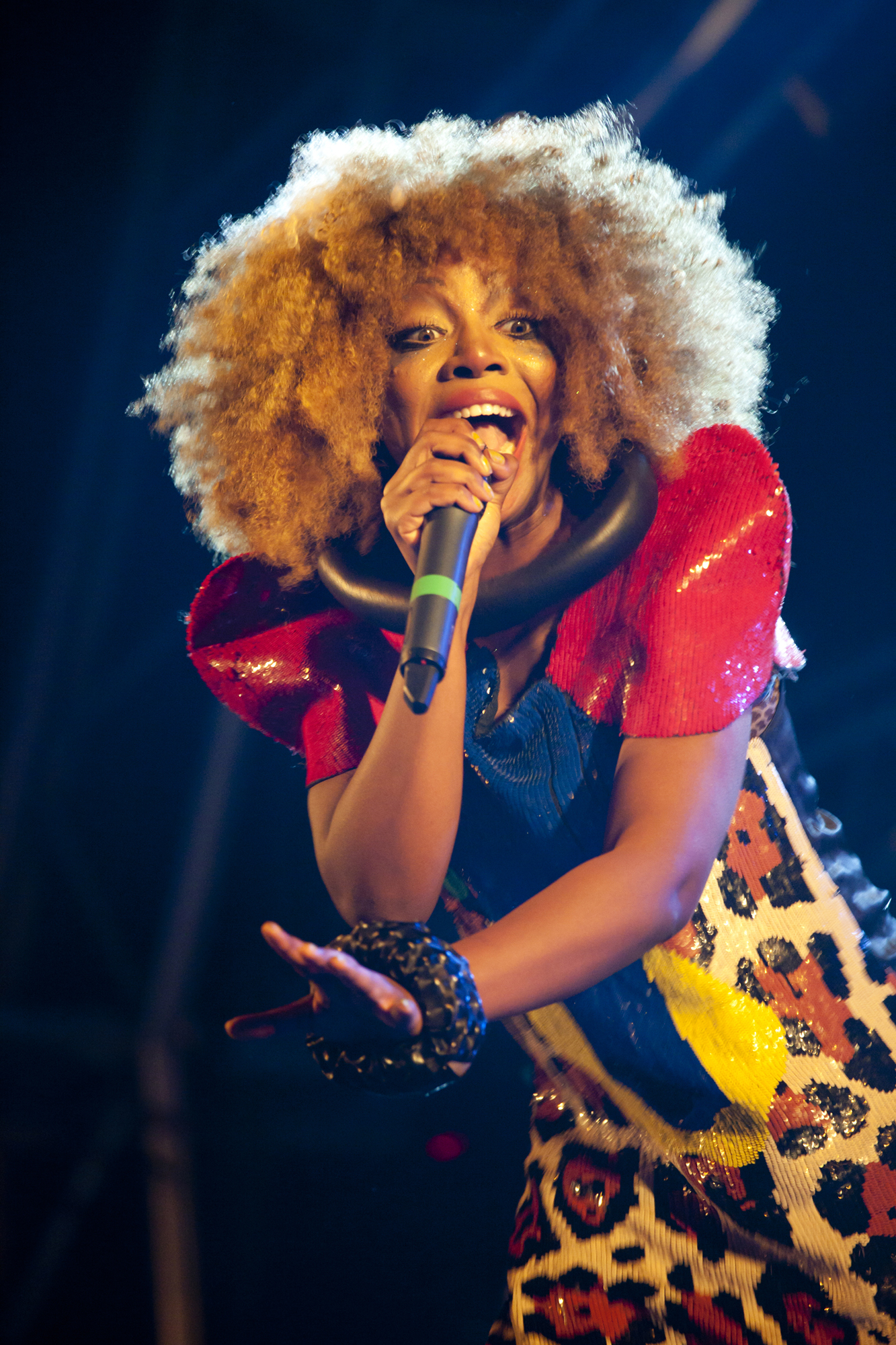
- Bones on 13 July 2010 in Barcelona, Spain

Background information
- Also known as: Ebony Bones!
- Born: Ebony Thomas; 9 October 1982 (age 43); London, England
- Genres: Afrobeat, art rock, avant pop, world, electronic
- Occupation: Singer
- Years active: 1998–present
- Labels: PIAS; 1984 Records; Sunday Best

Ebony Bones (née Thomas; born 9 October 1982) is an English singer. Her musical style is eclectic and often blends elements of afrobeat, art rock, post-punk, classical, new-wave and electronic. Her debut album Bone of My Bones was released to positive reviews in 2009. Recorded in India, her second album, Behold, a Pale Horse was released in September 2013, to critical acclaim. Her third album Nephilim went out in 2018.

== Music career ==
Ebony Bones was named by her original drummer Rat Scabies, of band The Damned. Known for her on-stage antics and theatrical costumes, she opened for Cee Lo Green's 2011 Tour across the UK and Europe. Beginning as a self-taught musician performing under the stage name 'Ebony Bones!', she anonymously uploaded music onto a blank Myspace page. Scabies encouraged her to also produce her own records : "I was very determined to carve out my own sound and not kind of have the pressure of someone else dictating to me what that should be".

Writing and producing her own material, "We Know All About U", depicting an Orwellian society, made its radio début as "The Hottest Record in the World Today" as well as "Single of the Week" on BBC Radio 1 by DJ Zane Lowe, also receiving daytime play from Jo Whiley, becoming Radio 1's most played single by an unsigned artist. Her début album Bone of My Bones was released in 2009 and hailed by critics. It included the tracks W.A.R.R.I.O.R and Guess We'll Always Have NY, later used for campaigns by Yves Saint Laurent, EA Sports FIFA 11 soundtrack, and a controversial Citroën car commercial featuring John Lennon, which was later banned in parts of Europe.

In 2010 she was requested to perform live at the Shanghai World Trade Show Expo 2010, Central Park SummerStage in New York, and The Grand Palais in Paris for SFR live concerts. In the summer of 2011 Ebony Bones also debuted new material from her second album at The Cannes Film Festival and T-Mobile International Film Festival.

In 2013, Bones released her second album Behold, A Pale Horse: it was partly conceived while travelling in India. The record featured the Symphony Orchestra of India and a cover of The Smiths. Behold, A Pale Horse was critically acclaimed and received good reviews by the likes of The Independent, and Spin. Bones decided to create and run her own label, titled "1984 Records". She has released a majority of her works on this album, such as her EP titled "Bread & Circus Pt. 1". She later released another EP titled, Milk & Honey, Pt. 1 in October 2015.

In 2015, Bones collaborated with Yoko Ono on Ono's remix album Yes, I'm A Witch Too: the track "No Bed For Beatle John" was a remix of an older song.

In July 2018, she released Nephilim; PopMatters hailed it in an 8 out of ten review saying: "It is a case of progression and evolution, and Ebony Bones has achieved a big leap forward with Nephilim. Looking back at her albums it's clear that her work in Bones of My Bones and Behold, A Pale Horse, have been a preparation for this moment. Nephilim finds Bones at her best, with a vision that spreads wider, but also with a more focused demeanor."

== Musical influences and artistry ==
On her MySpace, Bones cited in her influences singers of all genres such as Fela Kuti, Grace Jones, The Slits, Siouxsie Sioux and Public Enemy. Bones also said: "Lauryn Hill is phenomenal. I also like very much Siouxsie and the Banshees, Annie Lennox and Missy Elliott".

Her music has been described as "a modern-minded mash-up of early punk slammed against the sounds of old-school afro-beat icons". Her style was described as "idiosyncratic" and as boasting "an especially unique and commanding kind of groove". The Guardian said that Bones created a "unique brand of post-punk mantra-disco".

== Acting career ==
Attending London's Sylvia Young Theatre School alongside classmate Amy Winehouse, it is known that Ebony Thomas began her career at the age of 12, when she was spotted by BAFTA award winning actor and artistic director of Shakespeare's Globe Theatre Mark Rylance, for his production of Macbeth also starring actress Jane Horrocks. Nominated for The British Soap Awards in 2004 and 2005 for playing the role of Yasmin Green on the Channel 5 TV drama Family Affairs, she was one of the programme's youngest and longest-serving cast members. She appeared in Don Kent's 2012 film Ballade pour une reine [sic].

== Discography ==
- Bone of My Bones (2009)
- Behold, a Pale Horse (2013)
- Nephilim (2018)
