= Malachai (band) =

Malachai are an English two-piece band from Bristol, England. They were renamed Malachai in 2010 from the previous spelling Malakai after the band discovered that the name Malakai was already used by an American rap artist. The members of the band are Gee Ealey (vocals) and DJ Scott Hendy (music). Their sound is a mix of beats and samples, drawing on a wide range of influences from BBC Radiophonic-type experimentalism through "golden era" hip-hop to 1960s psyche pop.

== History ==
Discovered by Geoff Barrow from the Bristol-based band Portishead, Malachai (then as Malakai) released a limited edition 12" on Barrow's Invada Records record label called Fading World. This track was used as the music to accompany the I Count: Stop Climate Chaos video that first aired at the 2007 Glastonbury Festival. It was directed by Gerald McMorrow, whose film Franklyn also contained four Malachai tracks. In 2012 "Snowflake" provided the background ambience for the Lexus Walk the Walk All Weather Drive TV commercial.

Fading World was followed by their major-label debut, EP 1, on Island Records in September 2007. The lead track from EP 1, entitled "The Battle", was BBC Radio 1 DJ Zane Lowe's Single of the Week for the week commencing 9 July 2007. The song was made available to buy digitally in July 2007. On 30 July 2007, The Guardian newspaper featured Malakai as their New band of the day.

The band were featured on the Lily Allen And Friends television programme when they were voted in to play the show out.

They released their debut album, Ugly Side of Love, on Invada Records in February 2009. Malakai were the support for Doves UK tour from April to May 2009. They released Ugly Side of Love in North America and worldwide territories in early November.

The band, now billed as Malachai, is signed to Domino Records's Double Six label, and the album Ugly Side of Love was reissued in April 2010.

Their single "Snowflake" was featured on the soundtrack of FIFA 11.

Malachai's third and likely last album, Beyond Ugly, was released in March 2014 and features guest performances by Geoff Barrow and Kasabian's Sergio Pizzorno.

Their track "Down To Earth" (also on the Beyond Ugly LP) was featured in the official trailer for the 2014 release of US TV series Constantine on NBC.

== Discography ==
=== Singles ===
- "Fading World" (April 2007) Invada Records
- "EP1" (September 2007) Island Records
- "Snowflake" (February 2010)

=== Albums ===
- Ugly Side of Love (11 February 2009) Invada Records
- Ugly Side of Love (19 April 2010 re-issue) Double Six/Domino
- Return to the Ugly Side (22 February 2011) Domino Records
- Beyond Ugly (31 March 2014) Domino Records
