= The Chicas Project =

- Starring: Yasmin Deliz; Melissa Barrera
- Country of origin: United States
- No. of seasons: 4
- No. of episodes: 35

Production
- Running time: 60 minutes

Original release
- Network: mun2 (2007-2009)
- Release: January 27, 2007 – July 16, 2009

The Chicas Project is a reality television show on the bilingual television network mun2 that chronicles the adventures of the “Chicas,” two VJs for mun2, Yasmin Deliz and Melissa Barrera. The show wrapped its fourth season in 2009. In this program, the opening song is Karma Hunters by The Pinker Tones from their second studio album, The Million Colour Revolution.

== Chicas ==
Yasmin “Queenz” Deliz is a fiercely independent VJ for mun2 on the show Vivo, which highlights new music artists performing live. She moved to California at the age of sixteen to pursue her music career. She is also a reggaeton artist and model.

Melissa "Crash" Barrera was born August 10, 1985, in Los Angeles, California. She was expelled from two schools and emancipated from her parents by the age of 15, Barrera is now a rockera from Los Angeles who hosts The mun2 Shift: Late Night, also on mun2.

Despite differing styles and backgrounds, both have a great deal of charisma and charm and the two girls are close friends.

== Project ==
Each 2 weeks the girls are sent out on adventures where they learn new skills like how to surf, host events, or perform outrageous stunts like skydiving. Keeping with the mission of mun2, no matter what they do, the chicas always try to keep themselves and their identity rooted in their Hispanic culture. The show operates under the premise that along with entertainment value, the show is important because it acts as an example of positive young Latina role models in starring roles on television. “We get into some crazy stuff,” Yasmin says "...I think the show gives Latinas a chance to see themselves in a starring role on television. If they can’t relate to me, they can relate to Crash.” The show premiered its fourth season on July 9, 2009.
