= Howl (Norwegian band) =

Norwegian rock band

- Origin: Norway
- Genres: Alternative rock, rock
- Years active: since 2002
- Labels: EMI Music Norway
- Members: Simen Lund; Lars Bendixby; Knut Frøysnes; Kristian Syversen; Alex Engebretsen; Espen Blystad
- Website: www.howl.no

Howl is a rock band from Oslo, Norway. The band's name is taken from the Allen Ginsberg poem with the same name.

== The beginning ==
The band was formed in 2002 when childhood friends Lars Bendixby, Espen Blystad, Alex Engebretsen and Simen Lund started to play together while attending to the same school outside of Oslo. Through friends and acquaintances, the band came in touch with Knut Frøysnes and Kristian Syvertsen in 2004, and the band's original (and current) line-up was completed. Later the same year, the band debuted as a live act on the well known music scene Mono in Oslo. The band spent the next two years on the road, establishing a reputation as a solid live act and refining their musical expression.

== Higher Class Of Lush and record deal with EMI ==
In 2007, Howl released their debut album Higher Class of Lush on their own label. The album was self-produced in collaboration with Frode Jacobsen from the Norwegian rock band Madrugada. The album got attention from EMI, who re-released the album in 2008. The band was one of the finalists in Årets Urørt in 2008, which is a Norwegian contest for new and upcoming bands. The singles Repeater, Nineteenseventyfive og Silver Equals Gold ended up in high rotation on several Norwegian radio stations, and was one of the most played bands on the Norwegian youth radio station NRK P3 in 2008.

== Second album: Cold Water Music ==
In April 2009 the band announced that they had entered Kungstenstudios in Gothenborg, Sweden, and had started to record their second album. The producer is Mattias Glavå (Håkan Hellstrøm, Dungen, Broder Daniel). A number of potential songs were mentioned, such as Pillow, Weak Sense of Rebellion, Sobriety Hymn and To The Point(Where Nothing Hurts).

In May 2009 the band confirmed that they were about to enter the studio again for the second recording session, and that they were aiming to track three or four new songs. Some new song titles were mentioned: Let The Choir Sing, Song For K, Understanding Priorities, Privileged Love Bohemia (formerly known as Controller, which has been played live regularly) and Jubilation Reigns.

In September 2009 the band informed that they had been two more times in the studio during the summer, and that they were on their way into the studio for the fifth and hopefully the final recording session. New songs recorded until then was All of This Will Change, Television og Killing Suburbia. The band revealed that their goal was to record 15 brand new songs and select 10 for the album.

First single Misdemeanors from the new album was released on January 4, and went straight into rotation on NRK P3 and Radio Tango.

It was announced in late January that the album's title was Cold Water Music, and that the album was slated for release on March 8.

The following track list is now confirmed:

1. Urgency
2. Misdemeanors
3. Sobriety Hymn
4. Controller
5. High Hopes
6. Song For K
7. Weak Sense Of Rebellion
8. To The Point
9. Let The Choir Sing
10. Dödskalle

Cold Water Music is Produced by Mattias Glavå (Håkan Hellström) and mixed by David Bianco ( Bob Dylan, Teenage Fanclub among others).

On February 15, the new single Urgency was listed on NRK P3. The track can be listened to on the band's Myspace page. Also, the track named Controller is featured in the soundtrack of FIFA 11. The complete album is now on Spotify and Napster.

== Band Members ==
Current members

- Simen Lund – vocals
- Lars Bendixby – guitar
- Knut Frøysnes – guitar
- Kristian Syversen – drums
- Alex Engebretsen – bass
- Espen Blystad – keyboards
