= The Million Colour Revolution =

Studio album by The Pinker Tones
- Released: 7 February 2006
- Genre: Alternative pop
- Length: 48:54
- Label: Nacional Records & Outstanding Records

The Pinker Tones chronology
The BCN Connection (2004)	The Million Colour Revolution (2006)	More Colours! (2007)

Professional ratings
Review scores
Source	Rating
AllMusic	link
Pitchfork Media	(7.3/10) link

The Million Colour Revolution is the second studio album by Spanish alternative pop band The Pinker Tones. It was released on 7 February 2006 through Nacional Records in the United States and Outstanding Records in the United Kingdom.

== Track listing ==
All tracks written by The Pinker Tones.

No.	Title	Length
1.	"Señoras y Señores"	0:35
2.	"Welcome to TMCR"	3:39
3.	"Karma Hunters"	3:25
4.	"Beyond Nostalgia"	4:20
5.	"L'Heros"	3:57
6.	"Sonido Total"	3:41
7.	"Piccolissima Descarga"	0:33
8.	"In Pea We Nuts"	3:11
9.	"Pink Freud"	3:07
10.	"Many Years Ago"	0:36
11.	"Love Tape"	3:33
12.	"Mojo Moog"	4:18
13.	"Pinkerland Becaina"	2:47
14.	"Gone, Go On"	2:52
15.	"Maybe Next Saturday"	4:16
16.	"TMCR Grand Finale"	4:31

== Usage in media ==
- "Señoras y Señores" and "Welcome to TMCR" were featured in the final season of Ugly Betty.
- First single, "Sonido Total" appeared in Forza Motorsport 2, 1st season of Ugly Betty, English as a Second Language, Dj Nino remix version in the 4th season of Entourage (7th episode), The Border, 2007 TV series of Flash Gordon ("Ascension"), and Nick & Norah's Infinite Playlist.
- Second single, "Karma Hunters" appeared in the soundtrack of Forza Motorsport 2, Efectos secundarios and The Chicas Project.
- Their song "Beyond Nostalgia" appeared in The Chicas Project along with "Karma Hunters". It also appeared in Russian film, Newsmakers.
- Their song, "L'heros" appeared as soundtrack in the 2008 TV series of Privileged (3rd episode).
- Their song, "Pink freud" was used in Kia Motors TV commercial.
- Third single, "Love Tape" was featured in Flash Gordon.
- Their song were featured in Project Gotham Racing 4, English as a Second Language, Snow Gods and 2007 TV series of Flash Gordon (Life Source) with "In Pea We Nuts".
- Their final single "TMCR Grand Finale" featured on the soundtrack of the EA Sports video game, FIFA 07. It was also in La mujer de mi hermano and Snow Gods.
