= Pale horse =

Pale horse(s) may refer to:

== Books ==
- Pale horse (Bible), in the Book of Revelation, a horse ridden by Death, one of the Four Horsemen of the Apocalypse
- The Pale Horse, a 1961 novel by Agatha Christie
- The Pale Horseman, a 2005 novel by Bernard Cornwell
- On a Pale Horse, a 1983 novel by Piers Anthony
- Pale Horse, Pale Rider, a 1939 collection of three short novels by Katherine Anne Porter
- Pale Horse, a 1995 play by Joe Penhall
- Pale Horse, a fictional band in Alan Moore's comic Watchmen
- The Pale Horse, a 1909 novel by Boris Savinkov, published under the pseudonym "V. Ropshin"

== Film and TV ==
- The Pale Horse, a 1997 film of Christie's novel with Colin Buchanan and Hermione Norris
- The Pale Horse (TV series), a 2020 serial drama based on Christie's novel
- "Pale Horse," a fictional 1992 Steven Spielberg movie described in Watchmen (TV series), with superficial similarities to his film Schindler's List
- A pale horse is frequently seen and mentioned throughout the three seasons of Twin Peaks

== Music ==
- A Pale Horse Named Death, an American metal band
- Pale Horse and Rider, a musical duo
- 'Pale Horses (album), a 2015 album by MewithoutYou
- "Pale Horse", a song by John Vanderslice from the album Cellar Door
- Pale Horses (song), a song by Moby
- "Pale Horse", a song by The Smashing Pumpkins from Oceania
- "Pale Horse" - A Parkway Drive melody

== Other ==
- VMM-561 or Pale Horse, a squadron of the United States Marine Corps

== See also ==
- Behold a Pale Horse (disambiguation)
