= Wild Animals (The Pinker Tones album) =

Studio album by The Pinker Tones
- Released: 29 April 2008
- Genre: Indie pop, Alternative
- Label: Outstanding Records

The Pinker Tones chronology
More Colours! (2007)	Wild Animals (2008)	Modular (2010)

Professional ratings
Review scores
Source	Rating
Pitchfork Media	5.7/10 link

Wild Animals is the third album by The Pinker Tones, released in 2008. It also collaborate artists such as Amparo from Amparanoia and Jimmy Lindsay from Cymande.

== Track listing ==
All tracks written by The Pinker Tones.

No.	Title	Length
1.	"Hold On"	4:51
2.	"S.E.X.Y.R.O.B.O.T"	4:33
3.	"On Se Promenait"	3:10
4.	"The Whistling Song"	3:52
5.	"Electrotumbao"	3:23
6.	"Fugaz"	3:47
7.	"24"	2:57
8.	"Biorganised"	3:50
9.	"Happy Everywhere"	4:15
10.	"Wild Eleganz"	2:22
11.	"Working Bees"	3:58
12.	"Let Go"	1:45
13.	"24 (Live Acoustic Version)"	3:14

== Use in other media ==
- Their song, "The Whistling Song" used in the soundtrack of the 2008 films Beverly Hills Chihuahua, Otra Película de Huevos y Un Pollo, Ping Pong Playa and EA Sports video game, FIFA 09.
- Also "Electrotumbao" was featured in EA racing video game, NFS: Undercover and Tony Hawk: Ride.
- It also appeared in 2009 movie XIII edición de los 'Premios de la música' with Sexy Robot vs 24.
