= Life in Stereo (The Pinker Tones album) =

Studio album by The Pinker Tones
- Released: 15 May 2012
- Genre: Electronic, indie pop
- Label: Nacional Records & Outstanding Records

The Pinker Tones chronology
Modular (2010)	Life in Stereo (2012)

Life in Stereo is the fifth studio album by the Spanish electronic indie pop band The Pinker Tones. It was released on 15 May 2012 under label between Nacional Records and Outstanding Records.

== Track listing ==
No.	Title	Length
1.	"Requiem for Mono"	0:50
2.	"Life in Stereo"	4:08
3.	"Seul Les Elus"	2:30
4.	"Song Girls"	3:47
5.	"Hipnosis"	3:28
6.	"Loulou Stardust"	2:22
7.	"A Volar"	2:55
8.	"No"	3:28
9.	"In the Pista"	3:42
10.	"Chasing Manso"	0:37
11.	"Octopuses"	2:55
12.	"The Doors of Pinkerland"	1:37
13.	"Inseparables"	3:00
14.	"Furia Sobre Ruedas"	1:51
15.	"Collins Avenue"	2:26
16.	"Tango do Morangho"	3:03
