= The BCN Connection =

Studio album by The Pinker Tones
- Released: 6 September 2004
- Genre: Alternative
- Label: Outstanding Records

The Pinker Tones chronology
The BCN Connection (2004)	The Million Colour Revolution (2006)

The BCN Connection is the debut album by Spanish band The Pinker Tones, released in 2004 on the UK indie label Outstanding Records.

Before the album's release in the UK, it was released exclusively in Spain under the title, Pink Connection on the Spanish indie label, Wah Wah Records, in 2003. It includes two remixes, one by Konishi Yasuharu of Pizzicato Five and one by Ursula 1000, plus the video to "Mais Pourquois?" by Phila.

The album was later released in Japan via Rambling Records under the name Mission Pink in 2004. It included an additional remix, "Pinker Party (Dry Pinkertini Mix)", remixed by The Pinker Tones & DJ Niño, plus the bonus tracks "La Fiesta", "La Persecución" and "Conduciendo".

== Track listing ==
1. "A Message by his Holiness the Maharishi Pihnkhy"
2. " Viva la Juventud"
3. " Mais Pourquois?"
4. " Introducing Mr. Furia & Professor Manso"
5. " One of them"
6. " Advanced Night Repair"
7. " Pinker Party"
8. " Mario's Jingle"
9. " For the Righteous"
10. " Travel Club"
11. " One of Them · Readymade Jazz Exercise" (Remixed by Konishi Yasuharu)
12. " Mais Pourquois? · Le Swinging Mix"
13. " Pinker Party · Dry pinkertini Mix"
14. " Fly me to Brazil"
