= Bone of My Bones =

Studio album by Ebony Bones
- Released: Summer 2009
- Genre: Electronic music
- Length: 40:03
- Label: Sunday Best, Play It Again Sam
- Producer: Ebony Bones, A. Meehan, Jahmal Tonge, Andrew Wyatt, Tejo Damasceno, Alan Nglish

Ebony Bones chronology
Bone of My Bones (2009)	Behold, a Pale Horse (2013)

Singles from Behold, a Pale Horse
- 1. "Don't Fart on My Heart" Released: 7 June 2007; 2. "We Know All About You" Released: 26 November 2007; 3. "The Muzik" Released: 10 May 2009

Bone of My Bones is the debut album by English singer Ebony Bones, an alias of Ebony Thomas.

== Track listing ==
All tracks are written by Ebony Bones, except where noted

No.	Title	Lyrics	Music	Length
1.	"W.A.R.R.I.O.R."			3:25
2.	"We Know All About U"		Ebony Bones, Ori Kaplan & Tamir Muskat	4:31
3.	"Story Of St.Ockwell"		Ebony Bones & Jahmal Tonge	2:29
4.	"The Muzik"		Ebony Bones & Andrew Wyatt	3:56
5.	"In G.O.D We Trust (Gold, Oil & Drugs)"		Jahmal Tonge	3:17
6.	"Bone Of My Bones"			1:37
7.	"Guess We'll Always Have Ny"			3:56
8.	"Im Ur Future X Wife"			3:49
9.	"Smiles & Cynanide"		Ebony Bones & Tejo Damasceno	3:33
10.	"When It Rains"	D. McIntosh & Ebony Bones	Alan Kasirye	3:28
11.	"Don't Fart On My Heart"		Black Future & Ebony Bones	6:02

- "We Know All About U" contains a sample from "Bulgarian Chicks" by Balkan Beat Box.
- "Don't Fart On My Heart" contains a sample from "Eu Sou O Rio" by Black Future.

== Chart performance ==
Chart (2009)	Peak position
French Albums Chart	182

== Release history ==
Date	Label	Country
June 17, 2009	Beat Records	Japan
July 1, 2009	Vital	Italy
July 6, 2009	PIAS	France
July 10, 2009	PIAS, Rough Trade	Germany
October 26, 2009	Sunday Best	United Kingdom
