= Behold, a Pale Horse =

Studio album by Ebony Bones
- Released: 5 August 2013
- Recorded: 2011; India Recording Studios
- Genre: Dance-pop; alternative; pop rock
- Length: 44:32
- Label: 1984 Records; Sunday Best

Ebony Bones chronology
Bone of My Bones (2009)	Behold, a Pale Horse (2013)	Milk & Honey, Pt. 1 (2015)

Singles from Behold, a Pale Horse
- 1. "I See I Say" Released: 30 June 2013; 2. "Neu World Blues" Released: July 2013

Behold, a Pale Horse is the second album by English singer Ebony Bones, an alias of Ebony Thomas. The album was released on 5 August 2013 through 1984 Recordings and Sunday Best Recordings.

== Background ==
In 2013, Bones released her second album Behold, A Pale Horse: it was partly conceived while travelling in India. The record featured the Symphony Orchestra of India and a cover of The Smiths' What Difference Does It Make?. Behold, A Pale Horse was critically acclaimed and received good reviews by the likes of The Independent and Spin.

== Singles ==
"I See I Say" was released on 30 June 2013 as the lead single from the album.

"Neu World Blues" was released in July 2013 as the second single from the album.

== Track listing ==
No.	Title	Length
1.	"Behold, a Pale Horse" (featuring the Mumbai Symphony Orchestra)	1:27
2.	"I See I Say"	3:18
3.	"Mystery Babylon Balloon"	3:06
4.	"While the People S.L.E.E.P"	3:19
5.	"What Difference Does It Make" (featuring the New London Children's Choir)	3:41
6.	"Neu World Blues"	3:42
7.	"Breathe" (featuring Mechanical Elephant)	3:44
8.	"I.N.V.I.N.C.I.B.L.E."	6:48
9.	"Bread & Circus"	3:30
10.	"Morphine for the Masses"	3:55
11.	"Lazarus"	4:35

Bonus track
No.	Title	Length
12.	"W.A.R.R.I.O.R."	3:27
