= Ugly Side of Love =

Studio album by Malachai
- Released: 11 February 2009; 19 April 2010 (re-release)
- Genre: Progressive rock, psychedelic rock, pop
- Length: 29:00
- Label: Invada / Domino

Singles from Ugly Side of Love
- 1. "Snowflake" Released: 19 April 2010

Ugly Side of Love is the debut studio album from the British duo band Malachai. The album was originally released by Invada Records on 11 February 2009, comprising different cover artwork and the band's then-name Malakai, but was re-released by Domino Records on 19 April 2010.

== Track listing ==
No.	Title	Length
1.	"Warriors"	3:06
2.	"Shitkicker"	3:21
3.	"Snake Charmer"	1:09
4.	"Snowflake"	3:30
5.	"Blackbird"	2:16
6.	"Moonsurfin"	1:34
7.	"Meech's Theme"	0:56
8.	"Only for You"	2:47
9.	"Lay Down Stay Down"	2:33
10.	"Another Sun"	2:25
11.	"How Long"	3:12
12.	"Fading World"	3:55
13.	"Simple Song"	1:56

== Reception ==
Professional ratings
Review scores
Source	Rating
The Guardian	3/5 stars

The album received a mixed review in The Guardian, with Michael Hann stating that "When it works - on the likes of Shitkicker and How Long - it's terrific; but they can't keep the standards up: it's too fragmentary, too busy being groovier than thou."
