= Torpedo Boyz =

German-Japanese musical duo

- Origin: Berlin (Germany), Tokyo (Japan)
- Genres: Electronica, Funky Club Music,
- Years active: 2004–present
- Labels: Lounge Records (Germany), Music from the Roof (USA)
- Members: Returner; Daisuke; Kentastic; Bo; Borat
- Website: www.torpedo-boyz.com

The Torpedo Boyz are a German/Japanese electronic musical duo. They have released several albums, most notably Headache Music (released 23 Jan 2005) and Cum on Feel the Boyz (released 15 June 2007).

Torpedo Boyz's Headache Music was nominated for the 7th Annual Independent Music Awards for best Dance/Electronica Album of the year. In 2009, Torpedo Boyz won the 8th Annual Independent Music Awards for best Dance/Electronica Album.

== Discography ==
- Gimme a Bassline!!! (12" on Lounge)
- Are You Talking to Me???, incl. Fort Knox Five remix (12" on Lounge)
- Headache Music (12-track CD on Lounge)
- Start Being Nicer, incl. P E T remix (12" on Lounge)
- Are You Talking To Me??? Part 2 incl. Skeewiff remix (12" on Lounge)
- Torpedo Bootz (4-track 12" on Illegal Beats)
- Japaneeze Boyz, incl. Smoove & Cubismo Grafico remixes (12" on Lounge)
- Cum on Feel the Boyz (11-track CD on Lounge)
- The Disco Song, incl. Pinker Tones & Groove Alliance remixes (12" on Muto)
- Funky Stuff on Vinyl! (12-track DLP on Muto)
- Back to the Beatz!, incl. remixes by Torpedotrickser & Hopperider (12" on Lounge)
- (Hey You) The RockLosteady Crew (7" in golden vinyl on unge)
- Welcome to the Siugar Show (4-track 12" on Lounge)
- Return of the Ausländers (10-track CD on Lounge)
- Revenge of the Ausländers (15-track CD on Lounge)
- Welcome to the Schoko Show (Single on Lounge)
- Bocadillo (Single on Lounge)
- Girlfriend (Single on Lounge)
- Don't Cry (9-track 12" on Lounge)

== Soundtracks ==
(TV series, trailers & moving pictures):

- 2006 Le Iene (Italy)
- 2007 Suburban Girl (USA)
- 2007 Ladron Que Roba (USA/Mexico)
- 2007 Katie on Demand (USA)
- 2007 Meet Bill (USA)
- 2007 Cashmere Mafia (USA)
- 2008 Mai Dire Candid (Italy)
- 2008 Hotel Gramercy Park (USA)
- 2008 Kitty Landers Show (USA)
- 2008 Katie on Demand (USA)
- 2009 The T.O. Show (USA)
- 2009 Hotel Gramercy Park (USA)
- 2010 Love in the Big City 2 (Russia)

== Reviews ==
- https://www.allmusic.com/album/r942486
- https://www.allmusic.com/album/r1261832
