= Universo (TV channel) =

U.S. Spanish-language cable TV channel

- Country: United States
- Broadcast area: Nationwide
- Network: NBC; Telemundo
- Headquarters: Miami Springs, Florida

Programming
- Languages: English; Spanish; Spanglish
- Picture format: 1080i HDTV (downscaled to letterboxed 480i for the SDTV feed)

Ownership
- Owner: NBCUniversal (Comcast)
- Parent: NBCUniversal Telemundo Enterprises
- Sister channels: Telemundo; TeleXitos; Telemundo Internacional

History
- Launched: October 10, 1993; 33 years ago
- Former names: GEMS Television (1993–2001); mun2 (2001–2015); NBC Universo (2015–2017)

Links
- Website: NBCUniverso.com (redirects to the shows on nbc.com)

Universo is an American pay television channel owned by the NBCUniversal Telemundo Enterprises subsidiary of NBCUniversal. The network serves as a companion cable channel to the NBCUniversal's flagship broadcast television network NBC and, to some extent, its Spanish network Telemundo.

Aimed at Hispanic Adults between the ages of 18 and 49, the majority of its programming – which is tailored toward bilingual audiences – consists mainly of sports, scripted and reality series, and music programming. The network is headquartered in Miami Springs, Florida, while its master control operations are housed at the CNBC Global Headquarters in Englewood Cliffs, New Jersey, which serves as master control facilities for most of NBCUniversal's cable networks.

The network was founded by Empresas 1BC as GEMS Televisión. In 2001, the network was acquired by Telemundo and re-branded as mun2. The network was renamed NBC Universo in February 2015 to align it with Telemundo's sister English-language network NBC.

As of November 2023, Universo is available to approximately 22,000,000 pay television households in the United States-down from its 2016 peak of 45,000,000 households.

== Background ==
The network was launched on October 10, 1993, as GEMS Televisión, under founding owner Empresas 1BC. Cable television provider Cox Cable (now Cox Communications) acquired an ownership interest in the network the following year. The network's programming was aimed towards women of Hispanic or Latin origin.

=== As mun2 ===
Logo as mun2, used from 2001 to January 30, 2015.

In 2001, GEMS was purchased by the Telemundo Communications Group (then a joint venture led by Sony Pictures Entertainment and Liberty Media), and revamped its programming format to target younger viewers; it was renamed mun2, a name chosen to reflect the "two worlds" that Latino Americans live in (the name being a Spanish-language pun on "mundo" and the number 2, which is pronounced like "mundos" or "worlds").

Its initial lineup included programs from Telemundo's then sister company Columbia TriStar Television (now Sony Pictures Television), including repeats of Spanish language adaptations of Charlie's Angels (Angeles) and The Dating Game that had aired on Telemundo as part of a failed programming revamp in 1998 in an attempt to counterprogram its rival, Univision. In addition, mun2 ran blocks of programming from the Home Shopping Network's Spanish language network Home Shopping Español (HSE) daily from 12:00 a.m. to 2:00 p.m. Eastern Time.

Later in late 2001, NBC acquired Telemundo and mun2 from Sony Pictures and Liberty Media, and on August 2, 2004, General Electric, then-owners of NBC, acquired an 80% stake in Universal Pictures, merging it with NBC to form NBCUniversal, which was later acquired by Comcast in 2011.

The network's most well known series was the candid reality series I Love Jenni, which featured the life of banda/ranchero singer Jenni Rivera. After her death in a plane crash near Monterrey on December 9, 2012, the final season of the series earned the highest season average of any mun2 original program in its history, reaching a total of 5.5 million people across all of its telecasts during the season's 18-week run. It also ranked as the #1 show among all Hispanic cable networks in every key demographic during its Sunday night premiere. The series on-demand traffic increased, with over eight million video streams on mun2.tv, and over one million video on demand views.

=== As Universo ===
Logo used until January 17, 2017.

On December 24, 2014, NBCUniversal announced that it would relaunch mun2 as NBC Universo on February 1, 2015, to coincide with the network's Spanish-language broadcast of Super Bowl XLIX. The relaunch of the network under the NBC name and peacock logo was designed to reflect the broadcaster's commitment to the Spanish-language television market.

Eight months prior to the relaunching announcement, at NBCUniversal Hispanic Enterprises and Content's upfront presentation at New York City's Frederick P. Rose Hall on May 13, 2014, the company announced that NBC Universo would be revamping its programming. The new line-up would increase its focus on sports coverage (which included the re-organization of Telemundo's sports division as Telemundo Deportes, a branch of the English-language NBC Sports division), primarily in preparation for its broadcast of the 2016 Summer Olympics and its assumption of Spanish-language cable rights to FIFA tournaments (such as the 2018 FIFA World Cup), which began with the 2015 FIFA U-20 World Cup.

In February 2017, the channel's name was shortened to Universo as part of a brand refresh.

== Programming ==
Universo's programming consists of sports, original scripted drama series, reality series largely centered on popular Hispanic celebrities, movies, and music videos and music-related magazine programming; it also broadcasts series originating from Telemundo and networks operated as part of sister division NBCUniversal Cable, made up of original series from sister networks Syfy and USA Network, which incorporated Spanish subtitles. To reflect its audience, Universo does not exclusively air programming in Spanish, airing a mix of shows presented in English, dubbed into Spanish and incorporating Spanish language subtitles, and programs presented interchangeably in both languages.

Music programming on the network during its existence as mun2 usually consisted of a mix of music videos in English and Spanish from a variety of genres. In early April 2009, mun2 introduced two new music video-oriented shows called Indie y Nuevo (a program focusing more on independent artists, which has since been cancelled) and The Urban Tip (focusing on R&B, rap and reggaeton videos). In late December 2009, the network dropped its overnight block of infomercials that aired daily from 3:00 to 6:00 a.m. Eastern Time, and replaced it with additional music video programming either in the form of Reventon Mix (focusing on contemporary Latin party music) or Morning Breath (featuring a selection of videos from various artists). In January 2010, the network also began broadcasting a weekly block of feature films on Friday nights.

=== Sports programming ===
Universo broadcasts Spanish-language sports programming in conjunction with the Telemundo Deportes branch of the NBC Sports Group. Since the 2015 FIFA Women's World Cup, Universo is the Spanish-language cable rightsholder of FIFA tournaments through 2026.

In January 2010, NBC Universal announced that the channel would continue to broadcast Mexican soccer games (under the brand Fútbol Mexicano); most of the games aired to date were English-language telecasts of matches featured on Telemundo's Fútbol Estelar broadcasts. In February 2010, mun2 debuted mun2 Sports Arena, a half-hour sports news program that aired on Sunday evenings. The network held English-language rights to a 2010 FIFA World Cup qualifiers match between the United States and Mexico on August 12, 2009. mun2 offered a free preview for the day of the match.

On July 23, 2013, NBC Sports announced that Telemundo and mun2 would broadcast NASCAR events in Spanish in beginning in 2015, as part of NBC's new rights deal to cover the second half of the Cup Series and Xfinity Series season. As a prelude to the new contract, mun2 broadcast the opening event of the Toyota Series—NASCAR's Mexican series, at Phoenix International Raceway during the weekend of The Profit on CNBC 500 on February 28, 2014. Through NBC Sports' contract to televise the Premier League, the network began airing Spanish-language simulcasts of select matches broadcast in English on NBCSN with the 2013–14 season.

Through NBC's rights agreement with the NFL, mun2 carried its first Spanish simulcast of an NFL game, airing a Thanksgiving matchup between the Seattle Seahawks and San Francisco 49ers on November 27, 2014; the re-branded channel has served as the Spanish-language broadcaster of the Super Bowl during years NBC holds the rights. NBC had proposed using Telemundo to act as a Spanish-language simulcast partner for years following its 2001 purchase of the network, but this did not occur until the Premier League agreement.

Since the Liga MX Torneo Guard1anes 2020, Universo airs the home matches of Club Deportivo Guadalajara in that tournament as part of the Telemundo Deportes division alongside Telemundo and its sister streaming service Peacock.

=== List of programs broadcast by Universo ===
==== Current ====
Acquired programming

- Acércate a Rocío (since January 24, 2023)
- Escape perfecto (since August 19, 2024)
- Un día para vivir (since August 19, 2024)

Reruns of Telemundo programming

- 12 Corazones
- Caso Cerrado
- Historias de la Virgen Morena

Sports

- FIFA World Cup (since June 14, 2018)
- Major League Baseball on NBC (since March 26, 2026)
- NBA on NBC (since October 21, 2025)
- NBC Sunday Night Football (since February 1, 2015)
- Premier League (since August 16, 2013)

==== Former ====
- Atrapados en la aduana
- Chiquis 'N Control
- Day in Day Out
- El Show
- Encarcelados
- El Socio (July 22, 2018 – August 27, 2023)
- El Vato (April 17, 2016 – November 26, 2017)
- Escuela para maridos
- Fuerza especial de fugitivos
- Fugitivos De La Ley: Los Angeles
- Gran Hermano: La Novela
- Guerra de ídolos
- I Love Jenni
- Jenni Rivera Presents: Chiquis & Raq-C
- La frontera
- La ley de Laredo
- La Patrona
- Larrymania (October 7, 2012 – January 26, 2020)
- Latinx Now! (October 3, 2018 – 2022)
- Law & Order
- Law & Order: LA
- Los Thunderbirds
- Lugar Heights
- mun2 Shuffle
- Mi historia de fantasmas
- Milagros de Navidad
- Motivo para matar
- Narcos: Guerra antidrogas
- Niño Santo
- One Nation
- Operación Repo
- Pablo Escobar, el Patrón del Mal
- Pandilleros
- Paraíso perdido
- Preppers
- Prison Break
- ¿Quién da más?
- RPM Miami
- Reto superhumanos
- Seguridad de frontera: Australia
- Seguridad de frontera: Canada
- Seguridad de frontera: USA
- Se Habla Rock!
- Shockwave
- Sons of Anarchy
- Stan Lee's Superhumans
- Suelta la sopa (July 16, 2018 – August 17, 2018)
- The Chicas Project
- The Look
- The mun2 Shift
- The Riveras (October 16, 2016 – November 17, 2019)
- The Walking Dead
- Vivo
- Welcome to Los Vargas
- WWE ECW (January 9, 2009 – February 19, 2010)
- WWE Raw (October 5, 2005 – 2020)
- WWE NXT (2010)
- WWE SmackDown (October 2, 2010 – September 29, 2019)
