= Premios 40 Principales for Best Spanish Video =

Annual Spanish music award

- Awarded for: Best in Spanish and International music
- Country: Spain
- Presented by: Los 40 Principales
- First award: 2006
- Currently held by: "Berghain" by Rosalía, Björk and Yves Tumor (2026)

The Premio 40 Principales for Best Spanish Video is an honor presented annually at Los Premios 40 Principales.

Year	Artist	Work	Nominees
2006	David Bisbal	¿Quién Me Iba a Decir?	Nena Daconte– Idiota; Dover – Let Me Out; Estopa – Vacaciones; La Oreja de Van Gogh – Muñeca de Trapo
2007	Melendi	Calle La Pantomima	La Quinta Estación– Me Muero; Pereza – Aproximación; Dover – Keep On Moving; Hanna – Como la vida
2008	El Canto del Loco	Eres tonto	Nena Daconte– Tenía tanto que darte; Beatriz Luengo – Pretendo hablarte; Amaral – Kamikaze; Pignoise – Súbete a mi cohete
2009	Macaco	Moving	Nena Daconte– El Aleph; Zenttric – Solo quiero bailar; Second – Rincón exquisito; Fito & Fitipaldis – Antes de que cuente diez
2010	Carlos Jean	Ay Haití	Alejandro Sanz – Nuestro amor será leyenda; Dani Martín – 16 añitos; Miguel Bosé – Estuve a punto de; Maldita Nerea – El secreto de las tortugas
2011	Enrique Iglesias, Ludacris & DJ Frank E	Tonight (I'm Lovin' You)	Ragdog – Tú y yo; Huecco – Dame vida; Labuat – The time is now; Pignoise – Cama vacía
2012	Alejandro Sanz	No me compares	Carlos Jean – BlackStar; La Oreja de Van Gogh – Cometas por el cielo; Macaco – Love is the only way; Pablo Alborán – Te he echado de menos
2013	Auryn	Make my day	Dani Martín – Cero; Soraya – Con fuego; Pablo Alborán – Quién; Malú – A prueba de ti
2014	Enrique Iglesias	Bailando	Maldita Nerea - Mira dentro; Dani Martín - Emocional; Dvicio - Paraíso; Auryn - Puppeteer
2015	Macaco	Hijos de un mismo dios	Pablo Alborán - Pasos de cero; Efecto Pasillo - Cuando me siento bien; Alejandro Sanz - Un zombie a la intemperie; Sweet California - Wonderwoman
2016	Dani Martín	Las ganas	Enrique Iglesias ft. Wisin - Duele el corazón; Miss Caffeina - Mira cómo vuelo; Juan Magan ft. Luciana - Baila conmigo; Leiva - Sincericidio
2017	Leiva	La lluvia en los zapatos	David Bisbal - Antes que no; C. Tangana - Mala mujer; Blas Cantó - In Your Bed; Various artists. Tribute to Alejandro Sanz - Y, ¿si fuera ella?
2018	Melendi feat. Alejandro Sanz and Arkano	Déjala que baile	Pablo Alborán - No vaya a ser; Pablo López - El patio; Blas Cantó - Él no soy yo; Álvaro Soler - La cintura
2019	Vanesa Martín	De tus ojos	Leiva - No te preocupes por mí; Rosalía, J Balvin & El Guincho - Con altura; Macaco - Bailo la pena; Aitana & Lola Índigo - Me quedo
2020	Pablo Alborán & Ava Max	Tabú	Dani Martín - La mentira; Lola Índigo, Rauw Alejandro & Lalo Ebratt - 4 besos; Pablo López - Mariposa; Aitana & Reik - Enemigos
2021	Lola Índigo, Tini & Belinda	La niña de la escuela	Pol Granch - No pegamos; Sweet California - Whisper; Álvaro Soler - Magia; C. Tangana, Gipsy Kings, Nicolás Reyes & Tonino Baliardo - Ingobernable
2022	Marc Seguí	360	Álvaro de Luna - Levantaremos al sol; Ana Mena & Belinda - Las 12; Belén Aguilera - Camaleón; Pol Granch - De colegio; Rosalía - Saoko
2023	Aitana	Las babys	Nil Moliner - Vuela alto; Paula Cendejas - Selena; Marc Seguí - 5 estrellas; Abraham Mateo - Maníaca; Leo Rizzi - No siempre quedará París
2024	Vicco	Engatusao	Bad Gyal - Perdió este culo; Paula Koops - b.o.b.o.; Pol Granch - Titiritar; Sen Senra & Aitana - Hermosa casualidad; Walls - Quédate, mi corazón
2025	Walls	Haz lo que quieras conmigo	Vicco - Bailar y llorar; Lérica, Clara & Abraham Mateo - Golfo x despecho; Bad Gyal - Da me; Lola Índigo - Mojaita; Pablo Alborán & Indiara Sfair - Vámonos de aquí
