= Premios 40 Principales for Best Spanish Song =

Annual Spanish music award

- "Superestrella" by Aitana is the most recent recipient
- Awarded for: Best in Spanish and International music
- Country: Spain
- Presented by: Los 40 Principales
- First award: 2006
- Currently held by: "Superestrella" by Aitana (2026)
- Website: www.premios40principales.es

The Premio 40 Principales for Best Spanish Song is an honor presented annually at Los Premios 40 Principales.

Year	Artist	Work	Nominees
2006	El Canto del Loco	Volverá	Amaral – Resurrección; Diego Martín & Raquel del Rosario – Déjame verte; La Oreja de Van Gogh – Muñeca de Trapo; Pereza – Todo
2007	La Quinta Estación	Me Muero	Melendi – Calle La Pantomima; Antonio Carmona & Alejandro Sanz – Para que tú no llores; El Sueño de Morfeo – Para toda la vida; Conchita – Nada que perder
2008	El Canto del Loco	Eres tonto	Miguel Bosé & Bimba Bosé – Como un lobo; Amaral – Kamikaze; Chambao – Papeles mojados; Pereza – Estrella Polar
2009	Efecto Mariposa	Por quererte	Amaia Montero – Quiero ser; Macaco – Moving; Carlos Baute & Marta Sánchez – Colgando En Tus Manos; Melendi – Piratas del Bar Caribe
2010	Maldita Nerea	Cosas que suenan a...	Alejandro Sanz & Alicia Keys – Looking for Paradise; Robert Ramírez – Sick of Love; Estopa & Rosario – El Run Run; Pereza – Lady Madrid
2011	Malú	Blanco y negro	Juan Magan, Pitbull & El Cata – Bailando por ahí; Enrique Iglesias, Ludacris & DJ Frank E – Tonight (I'm Lovin' You); La Musicalité – 4 elementos; Carlos Jean – Lead the way
2012	Pablo Alborán	Te he echado de menos	Efecto Pasillo – Pan y mantequilla; Jose de Rico & Henry Mendez – Rayos de sol; Alejandro Sanz – Se vende; Juan Magan & Belinda – Te voy a esperar
2013	Malú & Pablo Alborán	Vuelvo a verte	Alejandro Sanz – Mi marciana; Melendi – Tu jardín con enanitos; Dani Martín – Cero; Pablo Alborán – Tanto
2014	Malú	A prueba de ti	Enrique Iglesias - Bailando; Leiva - Terriblemente cruel; David Bisbal - Diez mil maneras; Antonio Orozco - Llegará
2015	Pablo Alborán	Pasos de cero	Melendi - Tocado y hundido; Alejandro Sanz - Un zombie a la intemperie; Dvicio - Enamórate; Juan Magán ft. Paulina Rubio & DCS - Vuelve
2016	Pablo López & Juanes	Tu enemigo	Enrique Iglesias ft. Wisin - Duele el corazón; Fangoria - Geometría polisentimental; Manuel Carrasco - Yo quiero vivir; Morat - Cómo te atreves
2017	Álvaro Soler & Morat	Yo contigo, tú conmigo	Bombai feat. Bebe - Solo si es contigo; Leiva - La lluvia en los zapatos; Vanesa Martín - Complicidad; David Bisbal - Antes que no
2018	Pablo López	El patio	Leiva - La llamada; Pablo Alborán - No vaya a ser; Aitana & Ana Guerra - Lo malo; Malú - Invisible
2019	Beret	Lo siento	Dvicio & Taburete - 5 Sentidos; Alejandro Sanz & Camila Cabello - Mi Persona Favorita; Aitana - Vas a quedarte; Manuel Carrasco - Qué bonito es querer
2020	David Bisbal & Aitana	Si tú la quieres	David Otero & Taburete - Una foto en blanco y negro; Pablo Alborán & Ava Max - Tabú; Nil Moliner & Dani Fernández - Soldadito de hierro; Aitana & Cali y El Dandee - +
2021	Dani Martín	Portales	C. Tangana, La Húngara & Niño de Elche - Tú Me Dejaste De Querer; Álvaro de Luna - Juramento eterno de sal; Pablo Alborán - Si hubieras querido; Ana Mena & Rocco Hunt - A un paso de la luna
2022	Ana Mena	Música ligera	Aitana & Nicki Nicole - Formentera; C. Tangana & Nathy Peluso - Ateo; Dani Fernández - Clima tropical; Nil Moliner - Libertad; Rosalía & The Weeknd - La Fama
2023	Álvaro de Luna	Todo contigo	Aitana - Los Ángeles; Vicco - Nochentera; Lola Índigo & Quevedo - El tonto; Chanel & Abraham Mateo - Clavaíto; Rosalía & Rauw Alejandro - Beso
2024	Ana Mena	Madrid City	Abraham Mateo & Naiara - Tienes que saber; Beret & Mr. Rain - Superhéroes; Dani Fernández - Todo cambia; Enrique Iglesias & María Becerra - Así es la vida; Lola Índigo - La reina
2025	Dani Martín	El último día de nuestras vidas	Dani Fernández - Me has invitado a bailar; Depol - Te confieso; Lola Índigo - Sin autotune; Nil Moliner - Nexo 04. Tu cuerpo en braille
