= Premios 40 Principales for Best Spanish Album =

Annual Spanish music award

- Awarded for: Best in Spanish and International music
- Country: Spain
- Presented by: Los 40 Principales
- First award: 2006
- Currently held by: LUX by ROSALÍA (2026)

The Premio 40 Principales for Best Spanish Album is an honor presented annually at Los Premios 40 Principales.

Year	Artist	Work	Nominees
2006	La Oreja de Van Gogh	Guapa	Estopa – Voces de Ultrarrumba; Fito & Fitipaldis – Por la boca vive el pez; Diego Martín – Vivir no solo es respirar; Ana Torroja – Me cuesta tanto olvidarte
2007	La Quinta Estación	El mundo se equivoca	Miguel Bosé – Papito; Pereza – Aproximaciones; Melendi – Mientras no cueste trabajo; El Sueño de Morfeo – Nos vemos en el camino
2008	El Canto del Loco	Personas	Estopa – Allenrok; Amaral – Gato Negro Dragón Rojo; La Oreja de Van Gogh – A las cinco en el Astoria; Rosario – Parte de mí
2009	Amaia Montero	Amaia Montero	Pignoise – Cuestión de directo; La Quinta Estación – Sin Frenos; Pereza – Aviones; Macaco – Puerto Presente
2010	Alejandro Sanz	Paraíso Express	Miguel Bosé – Cardio; David Bisbal – Sin Mirar Atrás; Estopa – X Anniversarium; El Canto del Loco – Radio La Colifata presenta: El Canto del Loco
2011	Maldita Nerea	Fácil	Dani Martín – Pequeño; Melendi – Volvamos a empezar; Pablo Alborán – Pablo Alborán; La Oreja de Van Gogh – Cometas por el cielo
2012	Alejandro Sanz	La música no se toca	Estopa – Estopa 2.0; Macaco – El murmullo del fuego; Pablo Alborán – En acústico; Auryn – Endless Road, 7058
2013	Pablo Alborán	Tanto	Dani Martín – Dani Martín; Melendi – Lágrimas desordenadas; Malú – Dual; Efecto Pasillo – El misterioso caso de...
2014	David Bisbal	Tú y yo	Enrique Iglesias - Sex + Love; Leiva - Pólvora; Malú - Sí; Antonio Orozco - Dos orillas
2015	Alejandro Sanz	Sirope	Melendi - Un alumno más; Pablo Alborán - Terral; Auryn - Circus Avenue; Fito & Fitipaldis - Huyendo conmigo de mí
2016	Manuel Carrasco	Bailar el viento	Leiva - Monstruos; Love of Lesbian - El poeta Halley; Dani Martín - La montaña rusa; Fangoria - Canciones para robots románticos
2017	Joaquín Sabina	Lo niego todo	David Bisbal - Hijos del mar; Vanesa Martín - Munay; David Otero - David Otero; Taburete - Dr. Charas
2018	Pablo Alborán	Prometo	David Otero - 1980; Dani Martín - Grandes éxitos y pequeños desastres; Melendi - Ahora; Pablo López - Camino, fuego y libertad
2019	Leiva	Nuclear	Rosalía - El mal querer; Manuel Carrasco - La cruz del mapa; Blas Cantó - Complicado; Dani Fernández - Incendios
