= Los 40 Music Awards =

Spanish award show

Los40 Music Awards
- Current: Los 40 Music Awards 2026
- Awarded for: Best in Spanish and International music
- Country: Spain
- Presented by: Los 40
- First award: 16 December 2006
- Website: http://los40musicawards.los40.com

Los40 Music Awards, formerly known as Premios 40 Principales, is an award show by the musical radio station Los 40. It was created in 2006 to celebrate the fortieth anniversary of the founding of the worldwide station.

== History ==
Los40 is the most important music station in Spain, with 2,925,000 listeners in 2018, and the second-largest share of the country's radio audience just behind Cadena SER, under the PRISA group. It first began as a musical programme called Los 40 Principales in Madrid, from Cadena SER. After the program finished airing on 10 stations in the chain. At first, it lasted only two hours, then four, and then eight hours, when the program was transferred to the weekly edition on Saturday. The program was recorded and sent to all Cadena SER stations for broadcast, all at once, at the agreed time. Due to the success of the program, especially among young people, more and more hours of programming copaba and began to create his own style, the "Style 40" based on a language agile, dynamic, youthful, casual, for a very young audience where they compete in important music, music information and how to present the album. Wave Media was critical to convey that "Style 40" because we must not forget, the FM the tune a minority and Saturday afternoons Medium Wave stations emit eight hours of "Los 40" where listeners could choose the number 1. Thanks to the success of the program, and increased FM transmitters and receivers, Los 40 Principales daily duration was increased until 1979, where it became a 24-hour standalone radiofórmula, still belonging to the Cadena SER. In 1985 began broadcasting via satellite and in the 1987–1988 season, constituted as radio station, Cadena 40 Principales, now independent of the Cadena SER, but still under the control of PRISA Group, who owns both chains.

Top 40 Waves received the award in the category National Radio in 1985. In 1998 both received Ondas Awards for Best Presenter Joaquin Luqui Musical Program and the 40 to 1 for Best TV Specialist Program. The program Your place or mine got in 2000 Ondas Award Most Innovative Radio Program, original and for their service to society. In 2004, the alarm Anda Ya! received the Innovation Award to radio waves. In 2010, Frank White was awarded the Gold Antenna Federation of Radio and Television Spain1.

== Ceremonies ==
Year	Edition	Date	Venue	City
2006	I	16 December	Palacio de Deportes de la Comunidad de Madrid	Madrid
2007	II	14 December	Palacio de Deportes de la Comunidad de Madrid	Madrid
2008	III	12 December	Palacio de Deportes de la Comunidad de Madrid	Madrid
2009	IV	11 December	Palacio de Deportes de la Comunidad de Madrid	Madrid
2010	V	10 December	Palacio de Deportes de la Comunidad de Madrid	Madrid
2011	VI	9 December	Palacio de Deportes de la Comunidad de Madrid	Madrid
2012	VII	24 January 2013	Palacio de Deportes de la Comunidad de Madrid	Madrid
2013	VIII	12 December	Palacio de Deportes de la Comunidad de Madrid	Madrid
2014	IX	12 December	Palacio de Deportes de la Comunidad de Madrid	Madrid
2015	X	11 December	Palacio de Deportes de la Comunidad de Madrid	Madrid
2016	XI	1 December	Palau Sant Jordi	Barcelona
2017	XII	10 November	Palacio de Deportes de la Comunidad de Madrid	Madrid
2018	XIII	2 November	Palacio de Deportes de la Comunidad de Madrid	Madrid
2019	XIV	8 November	Palacio de Deportes de la Comunidad de Madrid	Madrid
2020	XV	5 December	Fluge Hall Facilities	Madrid
2021	XVI	12 November	Velódromo Islas Baleares	Palma de Mallorca
2022	XVII	4 November	Palacio de Deportes de la Comunidad de Madrid	Madrid
2023	XVIII	3 November	Palacio de Deportes de la Comunidad de Madrid	Madrid
2024	XIX	8 November	Palau Sant Jordi	Barcelona
2025	XX	7 November	Roig Arena	Valencia
2026	XXI	20 November	Palau Sant Jordi	Barcelona

== Categories ==
Spain

- Song
- Video
- Album
- Artist/Group
- Festival/Tour/Concert
- New Artist

Latin

- Latin Song
- Latin Artist/Group

International

- International Album
- International Song
- International Artist
- International New Artist
- International Video

America

- Song
- Album
- Pop Act
- Urban Act
- North Act
- Central Act
- South Act
- International Song
- International Act
- International New Act
- International Dance Act

== All-time ranking ==
=== Los Premios 40 Principales España ===
Act	Wins	Nominations
Aitana	10	28
Pablo Alborán	10	16
El Canto del Loco	8	9
Shakira	7	11
Alejandro Sanz	7	18
Rauw Alejandro	6	20
Malú	5	9
Juanes	4	7
One Direction	4	7
Maldita Nerea	4	10
Justin Bieber	3	9
Camila	3	4
La 5ª Estación	3	7
David Bisbal	3	9
La Oreja de Van Gogh	3	11
Anitta	2	7
The Black Eyed Peas	2	2
Teen Angels	2	2
Percance	2	2
Zoé	2	2
Ellie Goulding	2	2
Lady Gaga	2	3
Akasha	2	3
Auryn	2	6
Carlos Jean	2	6
Pereza	2	8
Macaco	2	8
Enrique Iglesias	2	9
Maná	2	13
Melendi	2	20
Beyoncé	1	4
Lucie Silvas	1	1
Sanalejo	1	1
Timbaland	1	1
Katamaran	1	1
Shamanes	1	1
Flex	1	1
Calle París	1	1
U2	1	1
Chancho en Piedra	1	1
Mirella Cesa	1	1
Fabiola	1	1
Mario Spinalli	1	1
Méndez	1	1
Norka	1	1
Tan Biónica	1	1
Los Vásquez	1	1
Los Reyes Vagos	1	1
Joey Montana	1	1
Lucenzo	1	1
LMFAO	1	1
Adele	1	1
Pablo López	1	1
Wisin	1	1
Álvaro Soler	1	1
Madcon	1	1
Gente de Zona	1	1
Macklemore & Ryan Lewis	1	2
James Arthur	1	2
Kudai	1	2
Andrés Cepeda	1	2
Santiago Cruz	1	2
Por Partes	1	2
Dúo Sway	1	2
Iván Barrios	1	2
J Balvin	1	2
Israel Brito	1	2
Don Omar	1	2
Despistaos	1	2
John Newman	1	2
Birdy	1	2
Meghan Trainor	1	2
Dvicio	1	3
OneRepublic	1	3
Efecto Mariposa	1	3
Amaia Montero	1	3
Fausto Miño	1	3
Ludacris	1	3
DJ Frank E	1	3
Axel	1	3
El Tambor de la Tribu	1	3
Malacates Trébol Shop	1	3
Ed Sheeran	1	3
Electric Nana	1	3
Jason Derülo	1	4
Belanova	1	4
Cali & El Dandee	1	4
Coldplay	1	4
Sam Smith	1	4
Taylor Swift	1	4
David Guetta	1	4
Ricky Martin	1	5
Nelly Furtado	1	5
Miranda!	1	5
Pitbull	1	6
Nena Daconte	1	6
Rihanna	1	7
Fito & Fitipaldis	1	7
Bruno Mars	1	9
Dani Martín	1	11

NOTES:
- Special awards not included.
- Awards/nominations to collaborations of two or more acts are counted for everyone involved.

=== Los Premios 40 Principales América ===
Act	Wins	Nominations
Jesse & Joy	3	4
Percance	2	2
Enrique Iglesias	2	3
One Direction	2	3
Pitbull	1	1
Vazquez Sounds	1	1
Denise Rosenthal	1	1
LMFAO	1	1
Axel	1	1
Francisca Valenzuela	1	1
Comando Tiburón	1	1
Daniel Páez	1	1
Piva	1	1
Iván Zavala	1	1
Aura	1	1
Descemer Bueno	1	1
Gente de Zona	1	1
Carly Rae Jepsen	1	2
Zoé	1	2
Maluma	1	2
Juanes	1	2
Calvin Harris	1	4

NOTES:
- Special awards not included.
- Awards/nominations to collaborations of two or more acts are counted for everyone involved.

== Performances ==
Year	Performers (chronologically)
2006	Dover; Jamelia; David Bisbal; Moby & Amaral; Lucie Silvas; Paulina Rubio
2007	Tokio Hotel; El Sueño de Morfeo; Nek & El Sueño de Morfeo; Chenoa; Pereza; Natasha Bedingfield; Conchita; Motel
2008	Kate Ryan; Estopa; The Cabriolets; Take That; Rosario; Beatriz Luengo; Keane; Beyoncé; Nena Daconte; Craig David (featuring Álex Ubago); El Canto del Loco
2009	Robbie Williams; Carlos Baute & Marta Sánchez; Amaia Montero; Macaco; Alesha Dixon; Estopa; Teen Angels; Paulina Rubio; James Morrison (featuring Nelly Furtado); Nelly Furtado; David Bisbal; Pixie Lott; Mika; Shakira
2010	Kylie Minogue; Edward Maya & Vika Jigulina; Maldita Nerea; Melendi; Ricky Martin; Nena Daconte; Inna; Dani Martín; Oceana; Robert Ramírez; Juanes; Macaco; Alejandro Sanz; Kesha
2011	Enrique Iglesias; Alexandra Stan; The Wanted; Amaia Montero; El Pescao; Marta Sánchez; Juan Magan; La Oreja de Van Gogh; Pablo Alborán & Malú; Mohombi; Shakira; Jessie J; Carlos Jean (featuring La Oreja de Van Gogh, El Pescao & Electric Nana)
2012	Pitbull; Cali & El Dandee; La Oreja de Van Gogh; Auryn; Pablo Alborán; José de Rico & Henry Mendez; Alejandro Sanz; Maldita Nerea; Alicia Keys (featuring Alejandro Sanz); Taylor Swift; David Guetta (featuring Taped Rai)
2013	Ricky Martin; Malú; Efecto Pasillo; James Arthur; Auryn; Antonio Orozco; Naughty Boy; Melendi; Jesse & Joy & Pablo Alborán; Olly Murs (featuring Edurne); Dani Martín; Estopa; Imagine Dragons; Pablo López; John Newman
2014	Midnight Red; Leiva; Inna; Pablo Alborán; Sweet California; Cris Cab; Malú; Maldita Nerea; One Direction; David Bisbal; Birdy; Dvicio; Melendi; The Vamps; Wisin
2015	Gente de Zona; Lost Frequencies, Lea Rue & Janieck Devy; Walk the Moon; Abraham Mateo; Macaco; Juan Magan; Auryn; Dasoul; Álvaro Soler; Ellie Goulding; Madcon; Pablo Alborán; Sweet California & Madcon; Pablo López & Juanes; Jasmine Thompson & Francesco Yates; J Balvin
2016	David Bisbal; Juanes; J Balvin & Bia; Kungs; Sidonie; Manuel Carrasco; Maluma; Fangoria; Leiva; Maná; Dani Martín; Jason Derulo; Morat; Little Mix; Miss Caffeina; Juan Magan; Robbie Williams
2017	Luis Fonsi; Leiva; Camila Cabello; Malú; Thirty Seconds to Mars; Pablo Alborán; Portugal. The Man; Rag'n'Bone Man; Morat & Álvaro Soler; Alejandro Sanz; Anne-Marie; Vanesa Martín & Leiva; C. Tangana; Kygo (featuring Justin Jesso & Conrad Sewell)
2018	David Guetta (featuring Anne-Marie & Bebe Rexha); Eleni Foureira; Melendi; Sofía Reyes; Dani Martín; Piso 21; Pablo López; David Bisbal; Bazzi; Rosalía; Ana Guerra & Aitana; Tom Walker; Bebe Rexha; Malú; Anne-Marie; Pablo Alborán (featuring Piso 21); Dua Lipa (featuring Pablo Alborán)
2019	Jonas Brothers (featuring Sebastián Yatra); Mabel; Manuel Carrasco; Leiva; Beret & Sofía Reyes; Sofía Reyes & Anitta; Anitta; Sam Smith; Amaral; Pedro Capó; Becky G; Dvicio & Taburete; Vanesa Martín; Ava Max; Don Patricio; Lola Indigo & Don Patricio; Aitana & Lola Indigo; Nicky Jam; Pablo Alborán & Ava Max; Rosalía
2020	Natalia Lacunza; Aitana; David Bisbal; C. Tangana, Niño de Elche & La Húngara; Camilo; Pablo Alborán; David Otero & Taburete; Nil Moliner & Dani Fernández; Nea; Pablo López; ELE; Tones and I; Ana Mena, Rocco Hunt & Fred De Palma; Bombai & Ana Guerra; Lola Índigo; Dani Martín; Beret & Pablo Alborán; Dua Lipa; Maluma; Carlos Tarque
2021	Hombres G; Dani Martín; Lola Índigo; Leiva & Ximena Sariñana; Ed Sheeran; Griff; Pablo Alborán, Aitana & Álvaro de Luna; Justin Quiles; Nicki Nicole; Sebastián Yatra; Marc Seguí; Ana Mena & Rocco Hunt; Melendi; Aitana; Beret; Álvaro Soler; Topic & A7S
2022	Rosalía; Sebastián Yatra; Chanel; Manuel Turizo; Danny Ocean; Tiago PZK; Manuel Carrasco; Aitana (featuring Sangiovanni); María Becerra; Marc Seguí; Lola Índigo & María Becerra; Leo Rizzi; Leiva; Anitta; Dani Fernández; Morat; Yungblud; Ana Mena (featuring Abraham Mateo); Ava Max; David Guetta & Becky Hill
