= Premios 40 Principales for Best Spanish New Artist =

Annual Spanish music award

- Chiara Oliver is the most recent recipient
- Awarded for: Best in Spanish and International music
- Country: Spain
- Presented by: Los 40 Principales
- First award: 2006
- Currently held by: Chiara Oliver (2026)
- Website: www.premios40principales.es

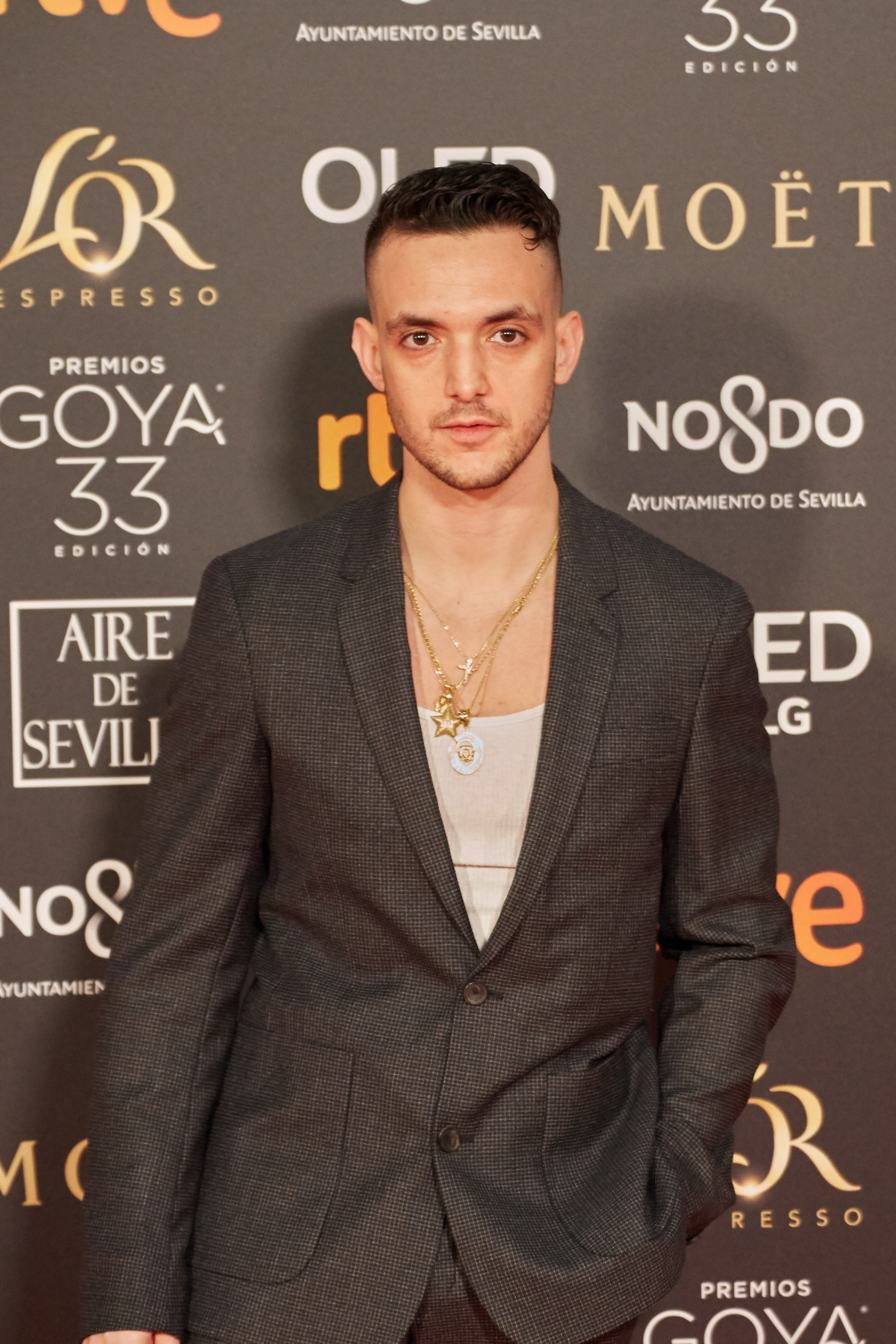
2017 winner C. Tangana.

The Premio 40 Principales for Best Spanish New Artist is an honor presented annually at Los Premios 40 Principales, the annual awards organised by Spain's top music radio Los 40 Principales.

Year	Winner	Other nominees
2006	Nena Daconte	Edurne; Huecco; Diego Martín; Sr. Trepador
2007	La Quinta Estación	Hanna; Conchita; Melocos; Jaula de Grillos
2008	Despistaos	Beatriz Luengo; The Cabriolets; Najwajean; No Way Out
2009	Calle París	Zenttric; Second; Ilsa; Ragdog
2010	Maldita Nerea	Pol 3.14; Funambulista; Preciados; Robert Ramírez
2011	Pablo Alborán	Labuat; Juan Magán; The Monomes; Carlos Jean
2012	Auryn	Chila Lynn; Efecto Pasillo; Lagarto Amarillo; Xuso Jones
2013	Pablo López	Marien Baker; Xriz; Wally López; El Viaje de Elliot
2014	Dvicio	Mr. Kilombo; Sweet California; Lucy Paradise; María Sagana
2015	Álvaro Soler	Calum; Amelie; Electric Nana; Dasoul
2016	Morat	Furious Monkey House; Nelou; Ana Mena; Marlon
2017	C. Tangana	Bombai; Blas Cantó; Taburete; Bromas Aparte
2018	Aitana & Ana Guerra	Reyko; Dani Fernández; Maico; Brisa Fenoy
2019	Lola Índigo	Beret; Pol Granch; Sinsinati; Don Patricio
2020	Nil Moliner	Maikel Delacalle; Natalia Lacunza; Lérica; Miki Núñez
