= Premios 40 Principales for Best International New Artist =

Annual Spanish music award

- Awarded for: Best in Spanish and International music
- Country: Spain
- Presented by: Los 40 Principales
- First award: 2006
- Currently held by: Ravyn Lenae (2026)

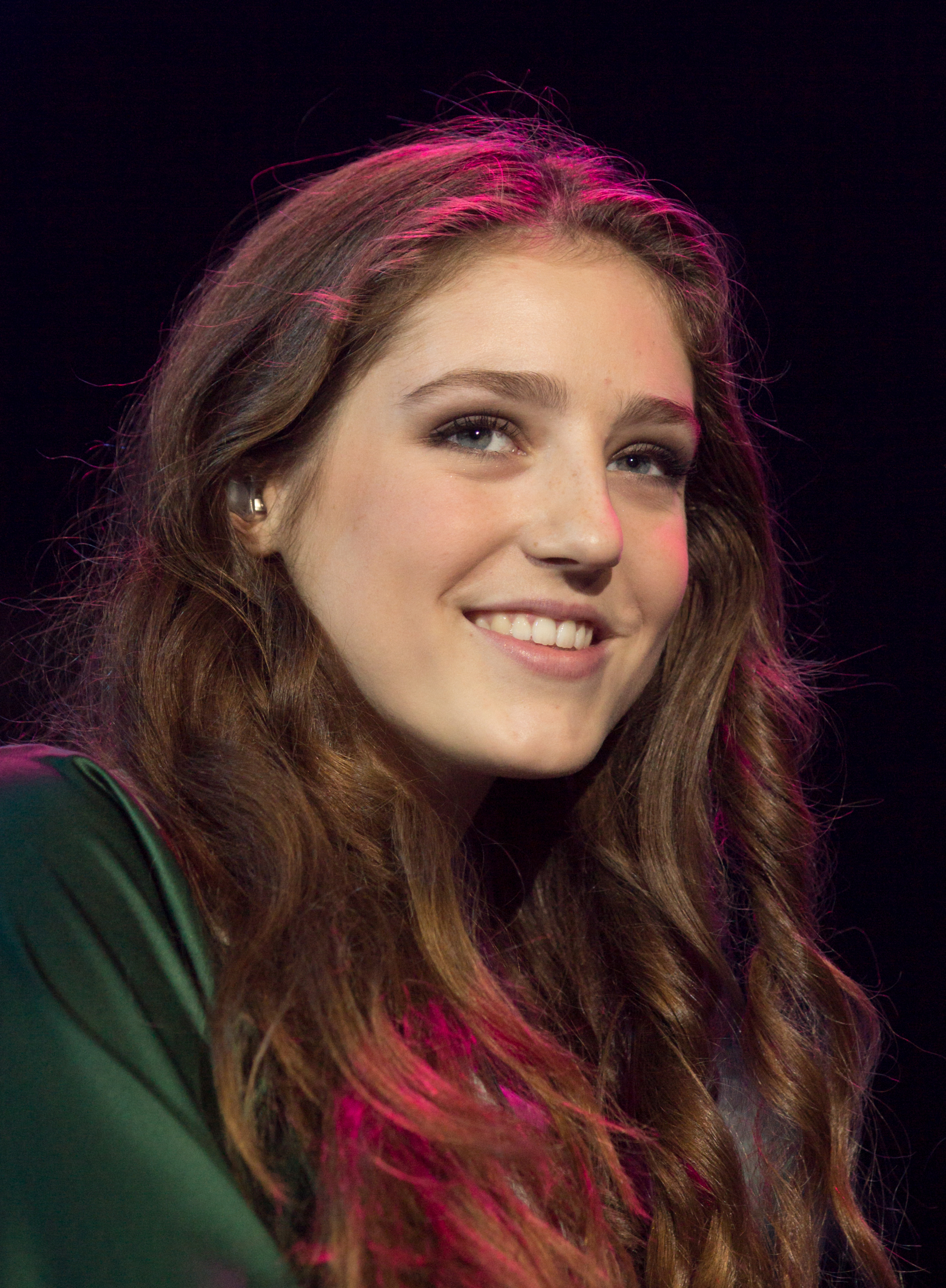
2014 winner Birdy.

The Premios 40 Principales for Best International New Artist is an honor presented annually at Los Premios 40 Principales, a ceremony that recognizes excellence in music organised by Spain's top music radio Los 40 Principales. The award was first presented in the inaugural award show in 2006, but would not be seen again until the 2012 edition.

Year	Winner	Other nominees
2006	(United Kingdom) Lucie Silvas	(United Kingdom) James Blunt; (United States) Kelly Clarkson; (United States) Pussycat Dolls; (United Kingdom) Corinne Bailey Rae
Category inactive from 2007 to 2011
2012	(United Kingdom) One Direction	(Canada) Carly Rae Jepsen; (United States) Fun; (Australia) Gotye; (Trinidad and Tobago) Nicki Minaj
2013	(United States) Macklemore & Ryan Lewis	(United Kingdom) John Newman; (United Kingdom) James Arthur; (United Kingdom) Passenger; (United States) The Lumineers
2014	(United Kingdom) Birdy	(Germany) Milky Chance; (United Kingdom) The Vamps; (United States) Ariana Grande; (New Zealand) Lorde
2015	(United States) Meghan Trainor	(United Kingdom) Sam Smith; (Republic of Ireland) Hozier; (Germany) Robin Schulz; (Sweden) Måns Zelmerlöw
2016	(France) Kungs	(United States) The Chainsmokers; (Canada) Drake; (United States) Twenty One Pilots; (Denmark) Lukas Graham
2017	(United Kingdom) Rag'n'Bone Man	(Iceland) Kaleo; (United States) Julia Michaels; (United Kingdom) Harry Styles; (United States) Bebe Rexha
2018	(United Kingdom) Tom Walker	(United Kingdom) Liam Payne; (United States) Post Malone; (United States) Marshmello; (United Kingdom) Anne-Marie
2019	(United Kingdom) Mabel	(United States) Ava Max; (United States) Panic! at the Disco; (United States) Lil Nas X; (United States) Billie Eilish
2020	(France) Aya Nakamura	(United Kingdom) Lewis Capaldi; (Australia) Tones and I; (Sweden) Nea; (United States) Doja Cat
2021	(United Kingdom) Griff	(Australia) The Kid Laroi; (United States) Olivia Rodrigo; (United States) 24kGoldn; (Italy) Måneskin
2022	(United Kingdom) Yungblud	(United Kingdom) Glass Animals; (United States) Gayle; (United States) Jaymes Young; (Canada) Lauren Spencer-Smith; (United Kingdom) Sam Ryder
Category inactive in 2023
2024	(United States) Benson Boone	(United Kingdom) Artemas; (United States) Mark Ambor; (United Kingdom) Myles Smith; (United States) Shaboozey; (South Africa) Tyla
2025	(South Korea) Huntrix	(United Kingdom) Myles Smith; (United States) Alex Warren; (United Kingdom) Lola Young; (New Zealand) Rosé; (United States) Sombr
