= Premios 40 Principales for Best International Artist =

Annual Spanish music award

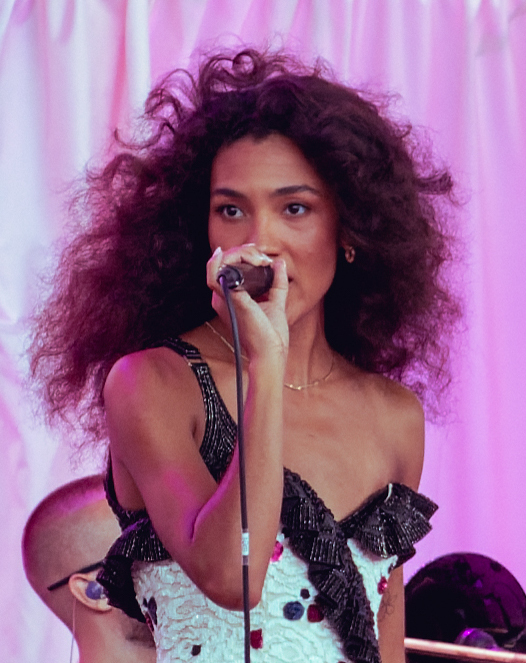
- Olivia Dean is the most recent recipient
- Awarded for: Best in Spanish and International music
- Country: Spain
- Presented by: Los 40
- First award: 2006
- Currently held by: Olivia Dean (2026)

Highlights
- Most wins: Ed Sheeran (3)
- Most nominations: Ed Sheeran (6)

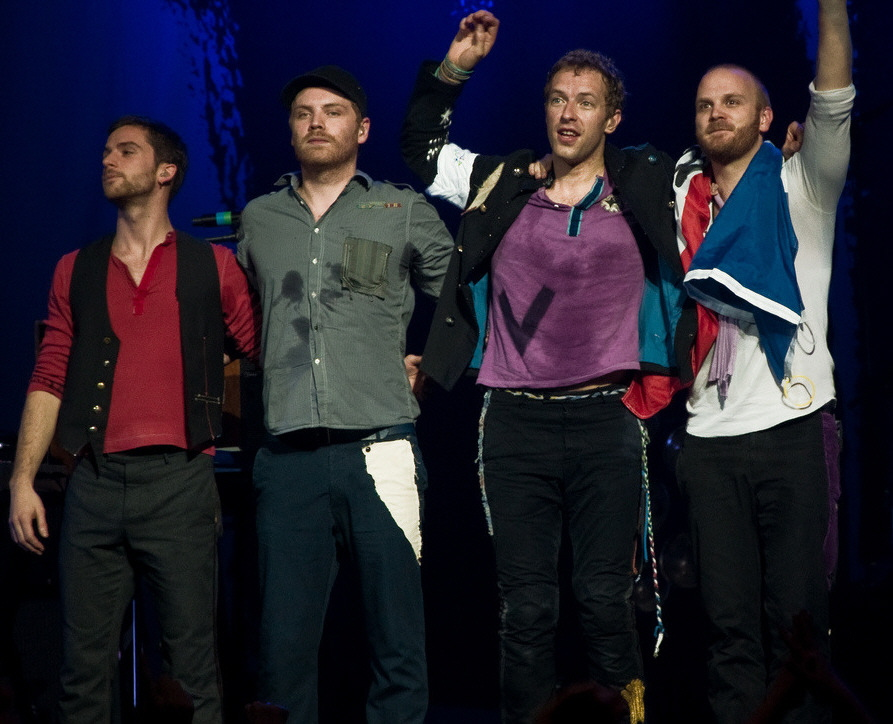
2008 winners Coldplay.

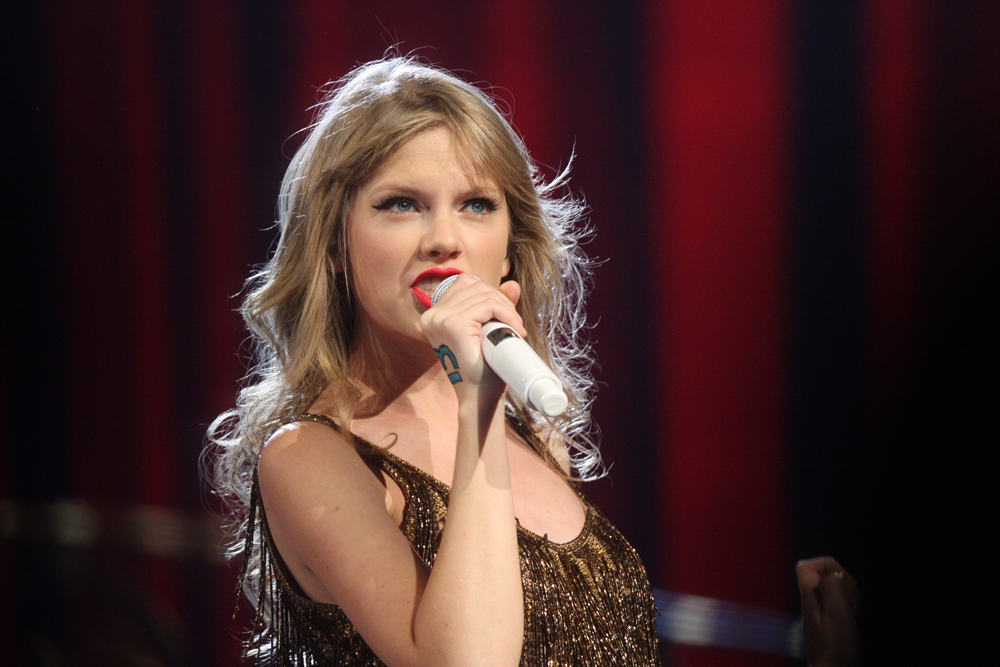
2012 winner Taylor Swift.

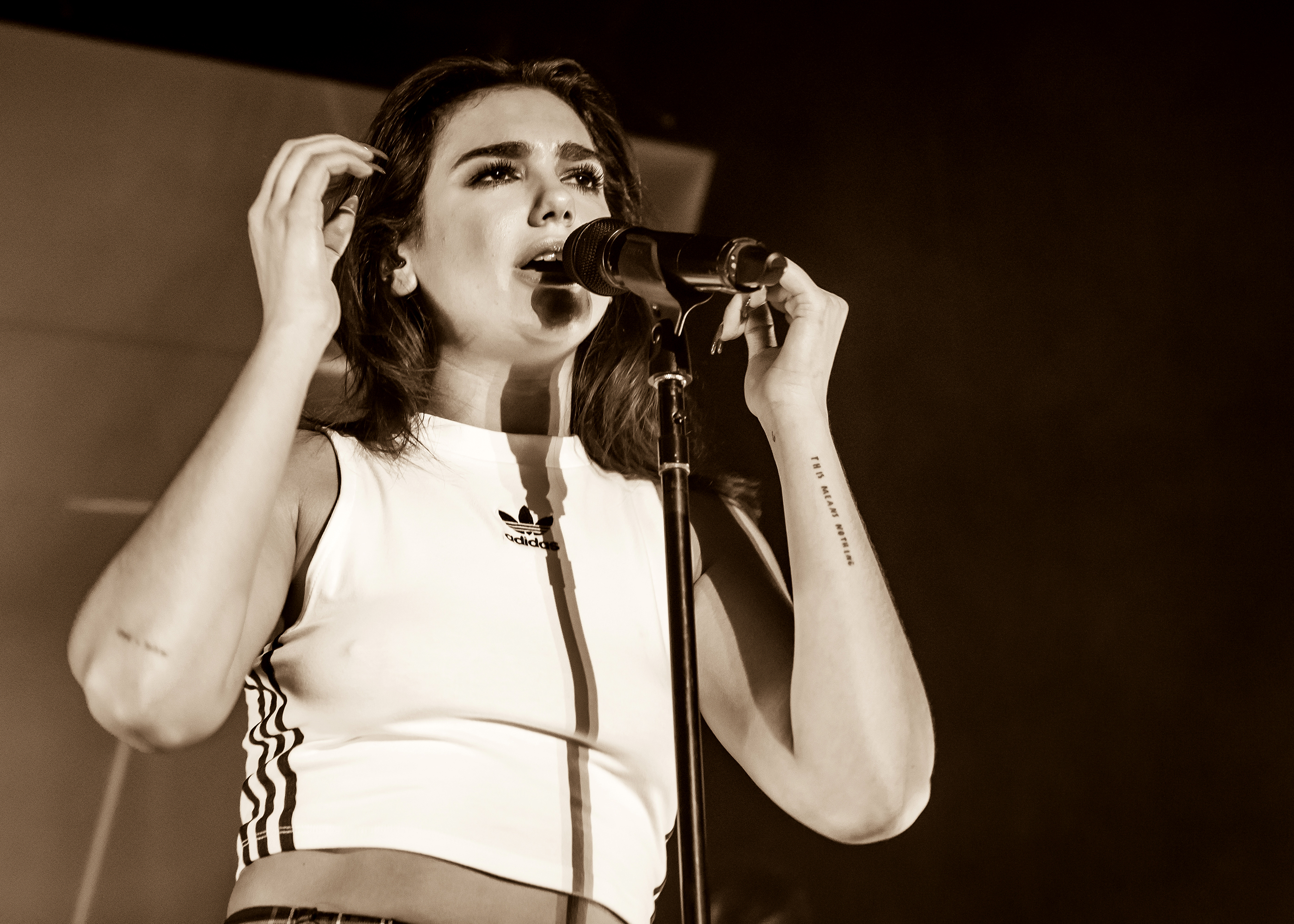
Two-time winner Dua Lipa.

The Premios 40 Principales for Best International Artist is an honor presented annually at the Los 40 Principales award show.

Year	Winner	Other nominees
2006	(Colombia) Shakira	(United States) Madonna; (Mexico) Maná; (United States) Red Hot Chili Peppers; (Mexico) Julieta Venegas
2007	(Canada) Nelly Furtado	(United Kingdom) Mika; (United Kingdom) Natasha Bedingfield; (Germany) Tokio Hotel; (United Kingdom) Snow Patrol
2008	(United Kingdom) Coldplay	(United Kingdom) Amy Winehouse; (United Kingdom) Duffy; (United States) Alicia Keys; (United States) Madonna
2009	(United States) The Black Eyed Peas	(United States) The Killers; (United States) Beyoncé; (United States) Jason Mraz; (United Kingdom) Amy Macdonald
2010	(United States) Lady Gaga	(France) David Guetta; (United States) Kesha; (Australia) Kylie Minogue; (Barbados) Rihanna
2011	(United States) Pitbull	(Barbados) Rihanna; (United States) Katy Perry; (United States) Britney Spears; (United States) Bruno Mars
2012	(United States) Taylor Swift	(United States) Alicia Keys; (France) David Guetta; (United States) Flo Rida; (United States) Maroon 5
2013	(United States) Bruno Mars	(United Kingdom) One Direction; (United States) Pink; (Barbados) Rihanna; (Sweden) Avicii
2014	(United Kingdom) One Direction	(United Kingdom) Coldplay; (United States) Jason Derülo; (United States) Pharrell Williams; (United States) OneRepublic
2015	(United Kingdom) Ellie Goulding	(United States) Maroon 5; (United Kingdom) Ed Sheeran; (Australia) Sia; (United States) Taylor Swift
2016	(Australia) Sia	(Canada) Justin Bieber; (United Kingdom) Coldplay; (United Kingdom) Adele; (United States) Jennifer Lopez
2017	(United Kingdom) Ed Sheeran	(Canada) Shawn Mendes; (Norway) Kygo; (United States) Bruno Mars; (United States) Charlie Puth
2018	(United Kingdom) Dua Lipa	(United Kingdom) Ed Sheeran; (Canada) Shawn Mendes; (United States) Bruno Mars; (United States) Selena Gomez
2019	(United States) Jonas Brothers	(United Kingdom) Rita Ora; (United Kingdom) Sam Smith; (United States) Miley Cyrus; (United Kingdom) Ed Sheeran
2020	(United Kingdom) Dua Lipa	(Canada) The Weeknd; (United States) Lady Gaga; (United Kingdom) Harry Styles; (United States) Black Eyed Peas
2021	(United Kingdom) Ed Sheeran	(United States) Imagine Dragons; (South Korea) BTS; (Canada) The Weeknd; (United States) Doja Cat
2022	(United States) Ava Max	(United Kingdom) Harry Styles; (United States) Camila Cabello; (United States) Imagine Dragons; (United States) Black Eyed Peas; (France) David Guetta
2023	(Sweden) Loreen	(United Kingdom) Dua Lipa; (United States) Olivia Rodrigo; (United States) Taylor Swift; (United States) Miley Cyrus; (United Kingdom) Sam Smith
2024	(United States) Teddy Swims	(United States) Benson Boone; (United States) Beyoncé; (United Kingdom) Dua Lipa; (United States) Sabrina Carpenter; (United States) Shaboozey
2025	(United Kingdom) Ed Sheeran	(United States) Gracie Abrams; (United States) Sabrina Carpenter; (United Kingdom) Coldplay; (United States) Miley Cyrus; (United States) Lady Gaga
2026	(United Kingdom) Olivia Dean	(United States) Benson Boone; (Sweden) Zara Larsson; (United States) Teddy Swims; (Australia) Tame Impala; (United States) Olivia Rodrigo
