= Premios 40 Principales for Best International Album =

Annual Spanish music award

Premio 40 Principales for Best International Album
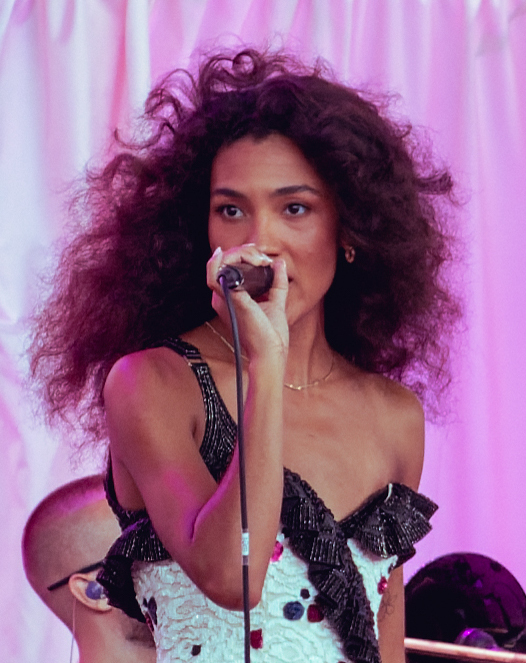
- The Art of Loving by Olivia Dean is the most recent recipient
- Awarded for: Best in Spanish and International music
- Country: Spain
- Presented by: Los 40 Principales
- First award: 2012
- Currently held by: The Art of Loving by Olivia Dean (2026)

Highlights
- Most wins: Ed Sheeran (3)
- Most nominations: Ed Sheeran (6)
- Website: http://www.premios40principales.es/

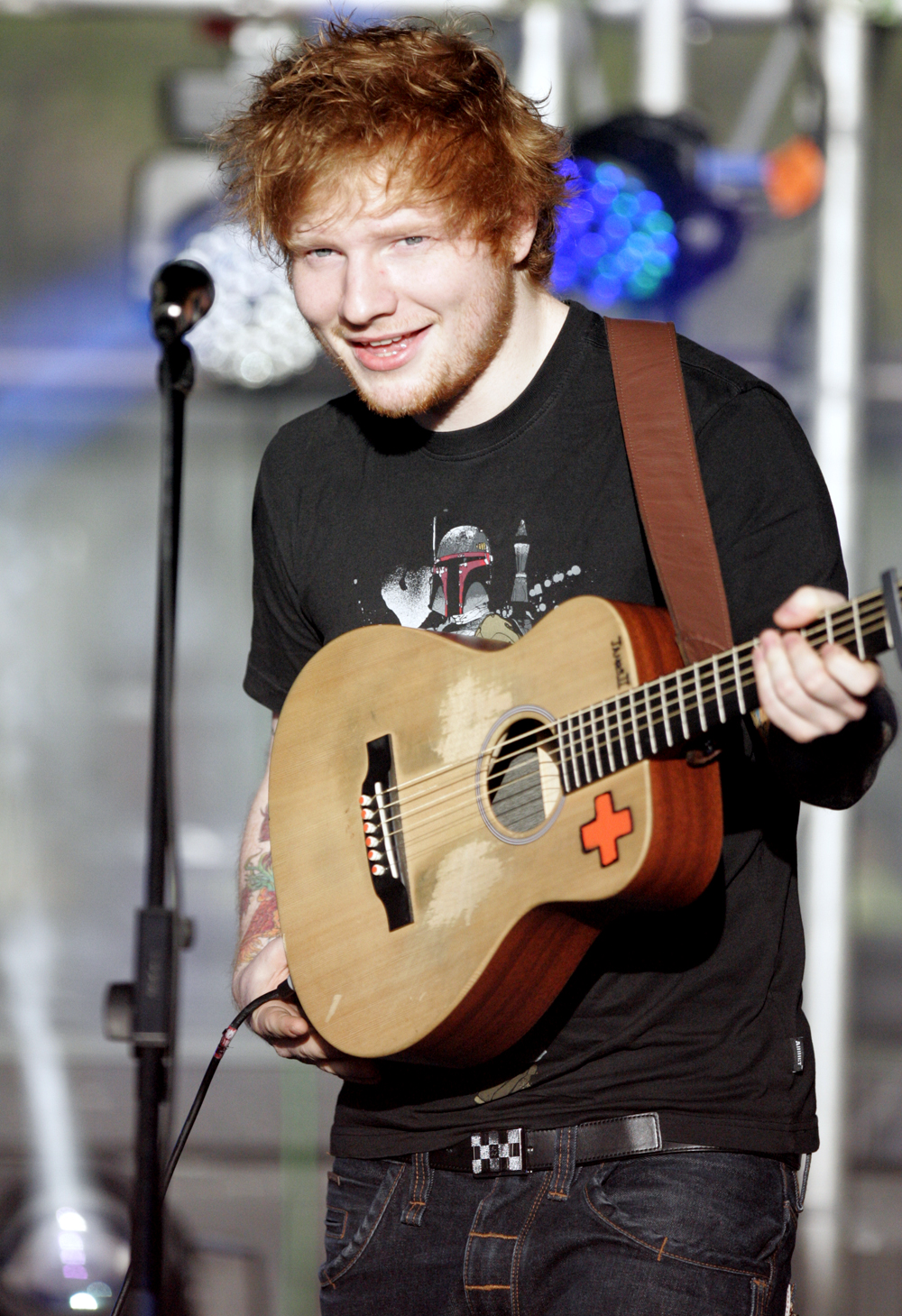
Three-time winner Ed Sheeran.

The Premio 40 Principales for Best International Album is an honor presented annually since 2012 at Los Premios 40 Principales, organised in Spain by the country's top music radio Los 40 Principales. They are considered Spain's most important music awards today.

== Winners and nominees ==
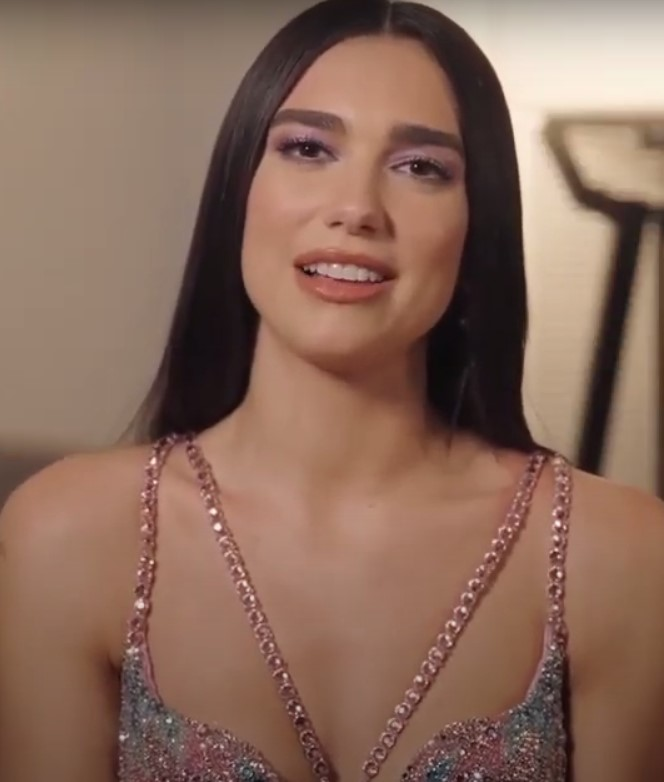
Two-time winner Dua Lipa

Year	Artist	Work	Nominees
2012	(France) David Guetta	Nothing but the Beat 2.0	(United Kingdom) Coldplay - Mylo Xyloto; (United States) Maroon 5 - Overexposed; (Barbados) Rihanna - Talk That Talk; (United States) Flo Rida - Wild Ones
2013	(United Kingdom) One Direction	Take Me Home	(Barbados) Rihanna - Unapologetic; (Sweden) Avicii - True; (United States) P!nk – The Truth About Love; (United Kingdom) Passenger – All the Little Lights
2014	(United Kingdom) Ed Sheeran	×	(United Kingdom) One Direction - Midnight Memories; (United States) Katy Perry - Prism; (United Kingdom) Birdy - Fire Within; (United States) Jason Derülo - Tattoos
2015	(United Kingdom) Sam Smith	In The Lonely Hour	(United States) Taylor Swift - 1989; (France) David Guetta - Listen; (United States) Maroon 5 - V; (Australia) Sia - 1000 Forms of Fear
2016	(Canada) Justin Bieber	Purpose	(Australia) Sia - This Is Acting; (Canada) Drake - Views; (United Kingdom) Coldplay - A Head Full of Dreams; (United Kingdom) Adele - 25
2017	(United Kingdom) Ed Sheeran	÷	(United Kingdom) Harry Styles - Harry Styles; (United Kingdom) Calvin Harris - Funk Wav Bounces Vol. 1; (United States) Bruno Mars - 24K Magic; (United States) Imagine Dragons - Evolve
2018	(United Kingdom) Dua Lipa	Dua Lipa	(Canada) Shawn Mendes - Shawn Mendes; (United States) Charlie Puth - Voicenotes; (United States) Camila Cabello - Camila; (United States) Post Malone - Beerbongs & Bentleys
2019	(United States) Billie Eilish	When We All Fall Asleep, Where Do We Go?	(United States) Jonas Brothers - Happiness Begins; (United Kingdom) Ed Sheeran - No.6 Collaborations Project; (United Kingdom) Mark Ronson - Late Night Feelings; (United States) Ariana Grande - Thank U, Next
2020	(United Kingdom) Dua Lipa	Future Nostalgia	(United Kingdom) Harry Styles - Fine Line; (Canada) The Weeknd - After Hours; (United States) Lady Gaga - Chromatica; (United Kingdom) Lewis Capaldi - Divinely Uninspired to a Hellish Extent
2021	(United States) Olivia Rodrigo	Sour	(Canada) Justin Bieber - Justice; (United Kingdom) Sam Smith - Love Goes; (Australia) The Kid Laroi - F*ck Love 3+: Over You; (United States) Ariana Grande - Positions
2022	(United Kingdom) Harry Styles	Harry's House	(United Kingdom) Ed Sheeran - =; (United Kingdom) Adele - 30; (United States) Imagine Dragons - Mercury – Acts 1 & 2; (Canada) The Weeknd - Dawn FM; (United States) Camila Cabello - Familia
2023	(United States) Taylor Swift	Midnights	(United Kingdom) Lewis Capaldi - Broken by Desire to Be Heavenly Sent; (United States) Miley Cyrus - Endless Summer Vacation; (United Kingdom) Sam Smith - Gloria; (United Kingdom) Ed Sheeran - -; (United States) Olivia Rodrigo - Guts
2024	(United States) Teddy Swims	I've Tried Everything but Therapy (Part 1)	(United States) Ariana Grande - Eternal Sunshine; (United States) Benson Boone - Fireworks & Rollerblades; (United States) Billie Eilish - Hit Me Hard and Soft; (United Kingdom) Dua Lipa - Radical Optimism; (United States) Taylor Swift - The Tortured Poets Department
2025	(United Kingdom) Ed Sheeran	Play	(United States) Lady Gaga - Mayhem; (Canada) The Weeknd - Hurry Up Tomorrow; (United Kingdom) Myles Smith - A Minute...; (United Kingdom) Coldplay - Moon Music; (Italy) Damiano David - Funny Little Fears
2026	(United Kingdom) Olivia Dean	The Art of Loving	(United States) Madonna - Confessions II; (United States) Bruno Mars - The Romantic; (United States) Taylor Swift - The Life of a Showgirl; (United States) Ariana Grande - Petal; (United States) Olivia Rodrigo - You Seem Pretty Sad for a Girl So in Love
