= Los Premios 40 Principales for Best International Video =

Annual Spanish music award

Premios 40 Principales for Best International Video
- Awarded for: Best in Spanish and International music
- Country: Spain
- Presented by: Los 40 Principales
- First award: 2013
- Final award: 2022

The Premio 40 Principales for Best International Video is an honor presented annually since 2013 at Los Premios 40 Principales.

Year	Winner	Other nominees
2013	(United Kingdom) John Newman — Love Me Again	(Sweden) Avicii — Wake Me Up; (United Kingdom) Naughty Boy & Sam Smith — La La La; (United States) Macklemore & Ryan Lewis — Can't Hold Us; (United States) Bruno Mars — Locked Out of Heaven
2014	(United Kingdom) One Direction — Story of My Life	(United States) Pharrell Williams — Happy; (United States) Miley Cyrus — Wrecking Ball; (United States) Jason Derülo — Wiggle; (United States) Katy Perry — Dark Horse
2015	(Norway) Madcon — Don't Worry	(Australia) Sia — Chandelier; (Republic of Ireland) Hozier — Take Me to Church; (United States) Meghan Trainor — All About That Bass; (United States) Taylor Swift — Shake It Off
2016	(United Kingdom) Coldplay — Up&Up	(United States) OneRepublic — Wherever I Go; (France) / (Australia) David Guetta feat. Sia — Bang My Head; (United States) Jennifer Lopez — Ain't Your Mama; (United Kingdom) / (United States) Naughty Boy feat. Beyoncé — Runnin'
2017	(Norway) / (United States) Kygo & Selena Gomez — It Ain't Me	(United States) / (Jamaica) Katy Perry feat. Skip Marley — Chained to the Rhythm; (United Kingdom) Ed Sheeran — Shape of You; (Puerto Rico) Luis Fonsi feat. Daddy Yankee — Despacito; (United States) Bruno Mars — That's What I Like
2018	(France) / (Australia) David Guetta feat. Sia — Flames	(United Kingdom) Dua Lipa — New Rules; (United States) / (Colombia) Nicky Jam & J Balvin — X; (United Kingdom) / (Colombia) Liam Payne feat. J Balvin — Familiar; (United States) The Carters — Apeshit
2019	(Mexico) / (United Kingdom) / (Brazil) Sofía Reyes feat. Rita Ora & Anitta — R.I.P.	(United Kingdom) / (United States) Mark Ronson & Miley Cyrus — Nothing Breaks Like a Heart; (United States) Billie Eilish — Bad Guy; (United States) Jonas Brothers — Sucker; (United Kingdom) Mabel — Don't Call Me Up
2020	(Canada) The Weeknd — Blinding Lights	(United States) Lady Gaga & Ariana Grande — Rain on Me; (United States) Ava Max — Kings & Queens; (Australia) Tones and I — Dance Monkey; (United Kingdom) Dua Lipa — Physical
2021	(United Kingdom) Ed Sheeran — Bad Habits	(United States) Lil Nas X — Montero (Call Me by Your Name); (United Kingdom) Dua Lipa — We're Good; (United Kingdom) Coldplay — Higher Power; (United States) Camila Cabello — Don't Go Yet
2022	(United States) Ava Max — Maybe You're the Problem	(United Kingdom) Adele — Oh My God; (France) / (United Kingdom) David Guetta, Becky Hill & Ella Henderson — Crazy What Love Can Do; (United Kingdom) Harry Styles — As It Was; (United States) Lil Nas X — Thats What I Want; (United States) Lizzo — About Damn Time
