= Premios 40 Principales for Best America Album =

Annual Spanish music award

- Awarded for: Best in Spanish and International music
- Country: America
- Presented by: Los 40 Principales
- First award: 2012
- Final award: 2012

The Premios 40 Principales for Best America Album is an honor presented annually at the Los 40 Principales, in a ceremony that recognizes excellence and contributions of Latino artists in the international scene, and creates a greater awareness of cultural diversity.

This is a list of the Los Premios 40 Principales winners and nominees for Best America Album.

Year	Winner	Other nominees
2012	Jesse & Joy — "¿Con Quién Se Queda El Perro?"	Juanes — "Juanes MTV Unplugged"; Daddy Yankee — "Prestige"; Wisin & Yandel — "Líderes"; Zoé — "MTV Unplugged/Música de Fondo"
