= Premios 40 Principales for Best America Best International New Act =

Former Spanish music award

Premios 40 Principales for Best America International New Act
- Awarded for: Best in Spanish and International music
- Country: America
- Presented by: Los 40 Principales
- First award: 2012
- Final award: 2012

The Premios 40 Principales for Best America International New Act is an honor presented annually at the Los 40 Principaless, a ceremony that recognizes excellence, creates a greater awareness of cultural diversity and contributions of Latino artists in the international scene.

This is a list of the Los Premios 40 Principales winners and nominees for Best America International New Act.

| Year | Winner | Other nominees |
|---|---|---|
| 2012 | One Direction | Gotye; Michel Teló; Carly Rae Jepsen; Calvin Harris |
