= Premios 40 Principales for Best America Best International Song =

Annual Spanish music award

Premios 40 Principales for Best America International Song
- Awarded for: Best in Spanish and International music
- Country: America
- Presented by: Los 40 Principales
- First award: 2012
- Final award: 2012

The Premios 40 Principales for Best America International Song is an honor presented annually at the Los 40 Principaless, a ceremony that recognizes excellence, creates a greater awareness of cultural diversity and contributions of Latino artists in the international scene.

This is a list of the Los Premios 40 Principales winners and nominees for Best America International Song.

Year	Winner	Other nominees
2012	Carly Rae Jepsen — "Call Me Maybe"	Michel Teló — "Ai Se Eu Te Pego"; Maroon 5 (featuring Wiz Khalifa) — "Payphone"; Gotye (featuring Kimbra) — "Somebody That I Used to Know"; Rihanna — "Where Have You Been"
