= Premios 40 Principales for Best America Song =

Annual Spanish music award

- Awarded for: Best in Spanish and International music
- Country: America
- Presented by: Los 40 Principales
- First award: 2012
- Final award: 2012

The Premios 40 Principales for Best America Song is an honor presented annually at the Los 40 Principales, a ceremony that recognizes excellence, creates a greater awareness of cultural diversity and contributions of Latino artists in the international scene.

This is a list of the Los Premios 40 Principales winners and nominees for Song of the Year.

Year	Winner	Other nominees
2012	Jesse & Joy — "¡Corre!"	Cali & El Dandee — "Yo Te Esperaré"; Alejandro Sanz — "No Me Compares"; Daddy Yankee — "Lovumba"; J Alvarez — "La Pregunta"
