= Premios 40 Principales for Best America Best South Act =

Former Spanish music award

Premios 40 Principales for Best America South Act
- Awarded for: Best in Spanish and International music
- Country: America
- Presented by: Los 40 Principales
- First award: 2012
- Final award: 2012

The Premios 40 Principales for Best America South Act is an honor presented annually at the Los 40 Principaless, a ceremony that recognizes excellence, creates a greater awareness of cultural diversity and contributions of Latino artists in the international scene.

This is a list of the Los Premios 40 Principales winners and nominees for Best America South Act.

Year	Winner	Other nominees
2012	Denise Rosenthal	Tan Biónica; Cali & El Dandee; Buxxi; Maluma
