= Leiva (singer) =

Spanish singer, musician and songwriter

- Leiva at the 2026 Latin Grammy Awards

Background information
- Born: José Miguel Conejo Torres; 30 April 1980 (age 46); Madrid, Spain
- Origin: Madrid, Spain
- Genre: Rock and roll
- Occupations: Singer; songwriter; musician
- Instruments: Vocals; guitar
- Years active: 2001–present
- Website: Official website

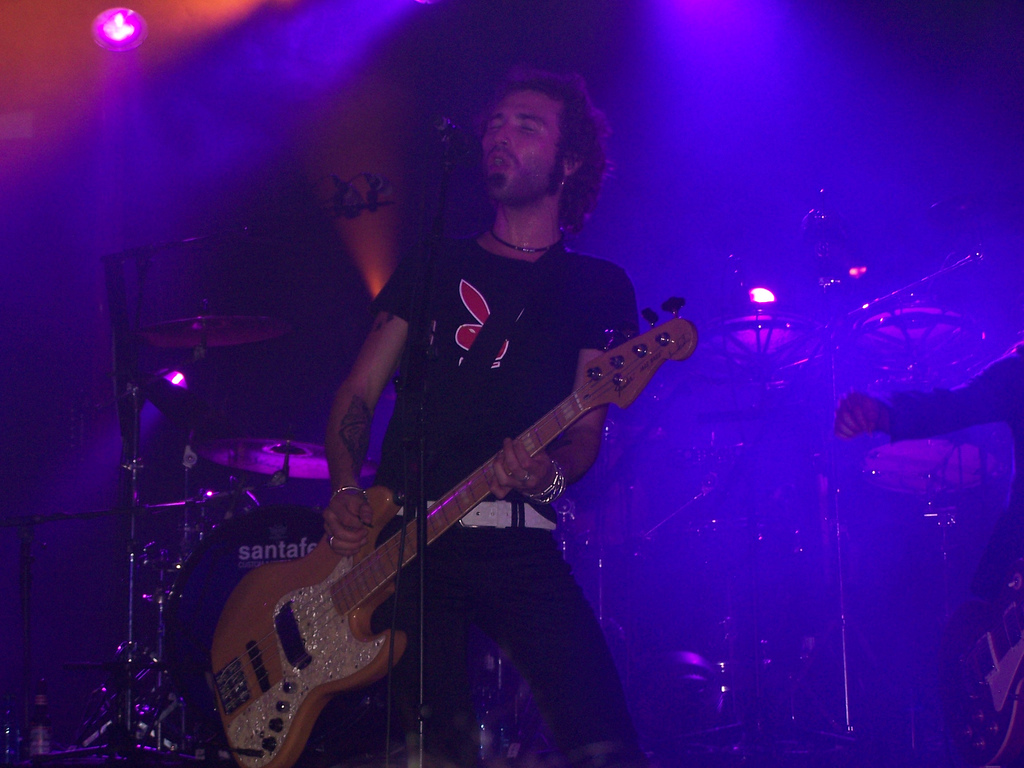
Leiva performing live in Pereza

José Miguel Conejo Torres (born in Madrid, 30 April 1980), better known by his artistic name Leiva, is a Spanish singer, musician and songwriter. Between 2001 and 2010 he led with Ruben Pozo the Spanish rock band Pereza, with which he recorded 6 albums. After the dissolution of the band, he started a solo career with 3 charting solo albums: Diciembre in 2012, Pólvora in 2014 and Monstruos in 2016.

== Biography ==
Leiva was born and raised in the neighborhood of Alameda de Osuna, in the northeast suburbs of Madrid. His great love of football coupled with his strong resemblance to Leivinha, a Brazilian footballer who at the time played for Atlético de Madrid, earned him the nickname Leiva. He would later use it as his stage name.

=== In Pereza ===
His first musical activity was in 1994, as he became part of the Malahierba band in which he was a drummer. In 1998 he formed a trio band together with Rubén Pozo and drummer Tuli with the intention of making cover versions of Leño. Subsequently Malahierba would evolve and become the band Pereza. The band released its debut album in 2001, but without much success. From the second album, Algo para cantar in 2003, the formation became a duo of Leiva and Ruben. With Animales in 2005, they gained great fame and consolidated their position as one of the most important Spanish pop rock bands. Pereza had three more albums, Los amigos de los animales in 2006, Aproximaciones in 2007 and Aviones in 2009.

=== Solo career ===
The duo split in September 2011 with Leiva continuing as a solo singer, songwriter and musician.

The first solo album of Leiva was Diciembre (2012), that was self-produced and received positive reviews and awards such as the Rolling Stone Award for best album of the year and two Latin Grammy nominations.

In January 2014 Leiva came out with his second solo album, titled Pólvora, a co-production with the Spanish musician Carlos Raya and Joe Blaney as soundman.

Both albums have proven very successful with Leiva releasing three singles charting singles on the Spanish singles market, and charting in PROMUSICAE charts, namely "Eme", "Afuera en la ciudad" and "Terriblemente Cruel" the latter two making it to positions 6 and 5 respectively on the Spanish charts. 'Eme' is a song which was dedicated to Michelle Jenner after a tough breakup. The singer express the left of her girlfriend, his feelings and his thoughts, hoping that she would come back.

In 2016 Leiva came out with "Monstruos". Is a record in which he explains the monsters the common social fears at bedtime.

== Discography ==
=== Albums and DVDs with Pereza ===
- 2001: Pereza (the only album as a trio, Rubén, Leiva and Tuli).
- 2002: Algo para cantar (as a duo of Rubén and Leiva)
- 2003: Algo para encantar (DVD)
- 2004: Algo para cantar (Special edition).
- 2005: Animales ("Princesas" became a successful single from the album)
- 2005: Princesas (DVD)
- 2006: Los amigos de los animales (Album and DVD)
- 2006: Barcelona (Album and DVD)
- 2007: Aproximaciones
- 2009: Baires, libro (Album and DVD)
- 2009: Aviones (Album and DVD) (notably romantic songs like "Llévame al baile"
- 2010: 10 años

=== Solo albums ===
==== Studio albums ====
Year	Album	Peak positions	Certification
Year	Album	SPA	Certification
2012	Diciembre	3	
2014	Pólvora	1	PROMUSICAE: Gold
2016	Monstruos	1	PROMUSICAE: Gold
2019	Nuclear	1	PROMUSICAE: Platinum
2021	Cuando Te Muerdes el Labio	1	PROMUSICAE: Platinum
2025	Gigante	1	

==== Live albums ====
Year	Album	Peak positions
Year	Album	SPA
2020	Madrid Nuclear (En Directo)	1

=== Solo singles ===
- "Eme" (2012)
- "Terriblemente Cruel" (2013)
- "Afuera En La Ciudad" (2014)
- "Mirada Perdida" (2014)
- "Sixteen" (featuring Carlos Tarque and Fito Cabrales) (2015)
- "Sincericidio" (2016)
- "La Lluvia en los Zapatos" (2016)
- "Breaking Bad" (2017)
- "La Llamada" (2017)
- "No Te Preocupes por Mi" (2018)
- "Nuclear" (2019)
- "Lobos" (2019)
- "En El Espacio" (2019)
- "Mi Pequeño Chernóbil" (2020)
- "La Estación Eterna" (2020)

== Awards and nominations ==
Award	Year	Category	Nominated work	Result	Ref.
Goya Awards	2017	Best Original Song	"La Llamada" from Holy Camp!	Won	
Goya Awards	2023	Best Original Song	"Sintiéndolo Mucho" from Sintiéndolo Mucho (shared with Joaquín Sabina)	Won	
Latin Grammy Awards	2012	Best Pop/Rock Album	Diciembre	Nominated	
Latin Grammy Awards	2013	Best Short Form Music Video	"Vis a Vis"	Nominated	
Latin Grammy Awards	2017	Best Short Form Music Video	"Sincericidio"	Nominated	
Latin Grammy Awards	2018	Best Rock Song	"La Llamada"	Nominated	
Latin Grammy Awards	2019	Best Rock Song	"Godzilla" (featuring Enrique Bunbury and Ximena Sariñana)	Nominated	
Latin Grammy Awards	2019	Best Pop/Rock Album	Nuclear	Nominated	
Latin Grammy Awards	2025	Best Rock Album	Gigante	Pending	
Latin Grammy Awards	2025	Best Pop/Rock Song	"Ángulo Muerto"	Pending	
Latin Grammy Awards	2025	Best Pop/Rock Song	"Un Último Vals"	Pending	
Los 40 Music Awards	2014	Best Spanish Act	Himself	Nominated	
Los 40 Music Awards	2014	Best Spanish Rock Act	Himself	Won	
Los 40 Music Awards	2014	Best Spanish Album	Pólvora	Nominated	
Los 40 Music Awards	2014	Best Spanish Song	"Terriblemente Cruel"	Nominated	
Los 40 Music Awards	2016	Artist of the Year	Himself	Won	
Los 40 Music Awards	2016	Critic Award	Himself	Nominated	
Los 40 Music Awards	2016	Album of the Year	Monstruos	Nominated	
Los 40 Music Awards	2016	Video of the Year	"Sincericidio"	Nominated	
Los 40 Music Awards	2017	Artist of the Year	Himself	Nominated	
Los 40 Music Awards	2017	Song of the Year	"La Lluvia en los Zapatos"	Nominated	
Los 40 Music Awards	2017	Video of the Year	"La Lluvia en los Zapatos"	Won	
Los 40 Music Awards	2017	Tour of the Year	Gira Monstruos	Nominated	
Los 40 Music Awards	2018	Song of the Year	"La Llamada"	Nominated	
Los 40 Music Awards	2019	Artist of the Year	Himself	Nominated	
Los 40 Music Awards	2019	Album of the Year	Nuclear	Won	
Los 40 Music Awards	2019	Video of the Year	"No Te Preocupes por Mí"	Nominated	
Los 40 Music Awards	2019	Festival, Tour or Concert of the Year	Tour Nuclear	Nominated	
Los 40 Music Awards	2022	Golden Music Award	Himself	Won	
Los 40 Music Awards	2022	Album of the Year	Cuando Te Muerdes el Labio	Nominated	
Los 40 Music Awards	2022	Best Collaboration	"Premio de Consolación" (with Natalia Lacunza)	Nominated	
MTV Europe Music Awards	2014	Best Spanish Act	Himself	Nominated	
MTV Europe Music Awards	2015	Best Spanish Act	Himself	Nominated	
MTV Europe Music Awards	2016	Best Spanish Act	Himself	Nominated	
MTV Europe Music Awards	2020	Best Spanish Act	Himself	Nominated	
Premios Odeón	2020	Album of the Year	Nuclear	Nominated	
Premios Odeón	2020	Best Male Artist	Himself	Nominated	
Premios Odeón	2021	Best Rock Artist	Himself	Won	
Premios Odeón	2021	Best Rock Album	Madrid Nuclear	Nominated	

Note: Three albums by Leiva have been nominated for Best Recording Package with the art director of each receiving the nomination; Boa Morente was nominated for Nuclear in 2019 and Cuando Te Muerdes el Labio (Edición Cerámica) in 2022, while Emilio Morente was nominated for Madrid Nuclear in 2021.
