= Efecto Mariposa =

Spanish rock group

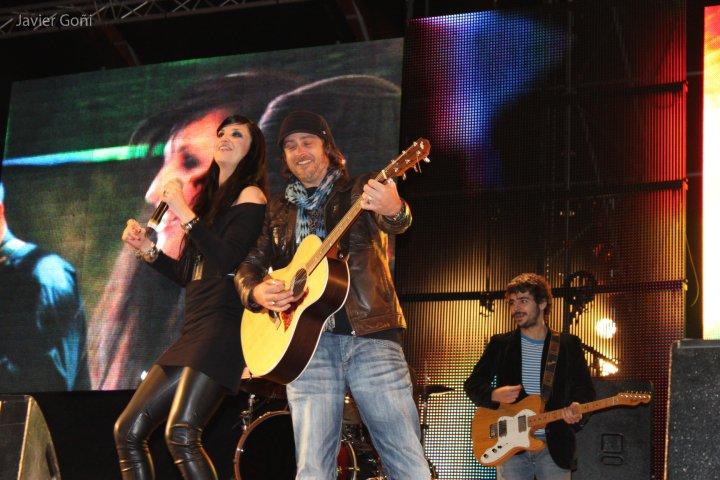
- Efecto Mariposa performing at the Primavera Pop 2010 in Barcelona

Background information
- Origin: Málaga, Spain
- Genres: pop, rock
- Years active: 2001–present
- Labels: Warner Music Spain
- Website: efecto-mariposa.com

Efecto Mariposa is a Spanish pop rock group from Málaga, founded in 2001.

== Discography ==
=== Albums ===
- 2001: Efecto Mariposa
- 2003: Metamorfosis
- 2004: Metamorfosis II
- 2005: Complejidad
- 2007: Vivo en vivo (No. 55 in the Spanish charts)
- 2009: 40:04 (No. 25 in the Spanish charts)
- 2014: Comienzo

=== Singles ===
Year	Song	Format	Album
2001	"Sola"	Promo CD and maxi single ("Sola"/"Dime")	Efecto Mariposa
2001	"Inocencia"	Promo CD	Efecto Mariposa
2001	"Cuerpo con cuerpo"	Promo CD, published only in Spain	Efecto Mariposa
2001	"Hoy por mi"	Promo CD, published only in Mexico	Efecto Mariposa
2002	"Sola" (Live)	Promo CD. Was subsequently included in the album Metamorfosis II.	Metamorfosis II
2003	"Que más da"	Promo CD	Metamorfosis
2003	"Dime dónde"	Promo CD	Metamorfosis
2004	"El mundo"	Promo CD	Metamorfosis II
2005	"Otra historia"	Wasn't put on sale.	Complejidad
2005	"No me crees"	Wasn't put on sale.	Complejidad
2006	"Entre flores"	Wasn't put on sale.	Complejidad
2006	"Complejidad"	Wasn't put on sale.	Complejidad
2007	"Si tu quisieras"	Wasn't put on sale.	Vivo en vivo
2008	"¿Quien?"	Wasn't put on sale.	Vivo en vivo
2009	"Por quererte"	Digital single No. 24 in the Spanish charts Music video	40:04
2009	"Diez minutos"	Digital single Music video	40:04
2014	"Ahora"	Digital single Music video	Comienzo

== Awards ==
- Premios 40 Principales 2009 for Best Song (for "Por quererte")
- Premio Cadena Dial for Best Album (for 40:04)
