= Los Premios 40 Principales 2010 =

Spanish music awards ceremony

- Date: December 10, 2010
- Venue: Palacio de Deportes de la Comunidad de Madrid
- Host: Mar Montoro, Frank Blanco and Tony Aguilar
- Network: Cuatro (Spain); A&E Network (Latin America)

== Performers ==
Artist(s)	Song(s)
Kylie Minogue	"Get Outta My Way" "In My Arms" "All the Lovers"
Edward Maya; Vika Jigulina	"Stereo Love"
Maldita Nerea	"El secreto de las tortugas" "Tu mirada me hace grande"
Melendi	"Barbie de extrarradio"
Ricky Martin	"Lo mejor de mi vida eres tú"
Nena Daconte	"No te invité a dormir"
Inna	"Hot" "Déjà Vu"
Dani Martín	"16 añitos"
Oceana	"Cry Cry"
Robert Ramírez	"Sick of Love"
Juanes	"Yerbatero" "Y No Regresas"
40 El Musical cast	"I Gotta Feeling"
Macaco; Estopa	"Con la mano levantá"
Alejandro Sanz	"Lola Soledad" "Desde Cuándo" (with Juanes and Dani Martín) "Looking for Paradise"
Kesha	"Tik Tok" "We R Who We R"

== Awards ==
=== Best Song ===
- Alejandro Sanz (featuring Alicia Keys) — "Looking for Paradise"
- Maldita Nerea — "Cosas que Suenan a..."
- Robert Ramírez — "Sick of Love"
- Estopa (featuring Rosario) — "El Run Run"
- Pereza — "Lady Madrid"

=== Best Video ===
- Alejandro Sanz — "Nuestro Amor Será Leyenda"
- Dani Martín — "16 Añitos"
- Carlos Jean — "Ay Haití"
- Miguel Bosé — "Estuve A Punto De"
- Maldita Nerea — "El Secreto de Las Tortugas"

=== Best Album ===
- Miguel Bosé — Cardio
- Alejandro Sanz — Paraíso Express
- David Bisbal — Sin Mirar Atrás
- Estopa — X Anniversarium
- El Canto del Loco — Radio La Colifata presenta: El Canto del Loco

=== Best Solo ===
- Melendi
- Alejandro Sanz
- El Pescao
- Dani Martín
- Enrique Iglesias

=== Group ===
- Despistaos
- Dover
- Pignoise
- Taxi
- Maldita Nerea

=== Best New Act ===
- Maldita Nerea
- Pol 3.14
- Funambulista
- Preciados
- Robert Ramírez

=== Best Tour ===
- David Bisbal — Sin Mirar Atrás Tour
- Miguel Bosé — Cardio Tour
- Alejandro Sanz — Paraíso Express Tour
- Maldita Nerea — El Secreto de Las Tortugas Tour
- Pignoise — Año Zero Tour

=== Best Argentine Act ===
- Miranda!
- Teen Angels
- Dante
- Diego Torres
- Emmanuel Horvilleur

=== Best Chilean Act ===
- Koko
- Mendez
- Zaturno
- Chico Trujillo
- Croni K

=== Best Colombian Act ===
- Dragon & Caballero
- J. Balvin
- Sebastian Yepes
- Santiago Cruz
- Don Tetto
- Kio Dj

=== Best Costa Rican Act ===
- Fuerza Dread
- Percance
- Escats
- 4/ 24
- Alonso Solis

=== Best Ecuadorian Act ===
- Caalu
- Norca
- Tercer Mundo
- Fausto Miño
- Daniel Betancourt

=== Best Guatemalan Act ===
- Francis Dávila
- Malacates Trebol Shop
- Duo Sway
- El Clubo
- Viento en Contra

=== Best Mexican Act ===
- Alejandro Fernández
- Camila
- Belanova
- Panteon Rococo
- Moenia

=== Best Panamanian Act ===
- Manuel Araúz
- Iván Barrios
- Margarita Henríquez
- Comando Tiburón
- Jhonny D

=== Best Latin Song ===
- Shakira — "Waka Waka (Esto es África)"
- Camila — "Mientes"
- Diego Torres — "Guapa"
- Juanes — "Yerbatero"
- Paulina Rubio — "Ni Rosas Ni Juguetes"

=== Best Latin Act ===
- Shakira
- Juanes
- Wisin & Yandel
- Camila
- Pitbull

=== Best International Song ===
- David Guetta (featuring Akon) — "Sexy Bitch"
- Kesha — "Tik Tok"
- Lady Gaga — "Bad Romance"
- Edward Maya (featuring Vika Jigulina) — "Stereo Love"
- Taio Cruz — "Break Your Heart"

=== Best International Act ===
- David Guetta
- Lady Gaga
- Kesha
- Kylie Minogue
- Rihanna

=== Lifetime Achievement Award ===
- Cher

== Presenters ==
- Leonor Watling — presented Best Group
- Mar Montoro — introduced Edward Maya (featuring Vika Jigulina)
- Ana María Polvorosa and Pepa Rus — presented Best Costa Rican Act and Best International Act
- José Motá — presented Best Chilean Act
- Félix Gómez and Inma Cuesta — presented Best Tour
- Ricky Martin — presented
- La Mala Rodríguez — presented Best Colombian Act
- Vanesa Sáez — Best Argentine Act
- Ana Fernández and Luis Fernández — presented Best International Song
- Fdez & Fdez — presented Best Ecuadorian Act
- Tony Aguilar — introduced Dani Martín
- Melanie Olivares and Vanessa Romero — presented Best Panamanian Act
- Miren Ibarguren and Canco Rodríguez — presented Best Latin Song and Best Guatemalan Act
- Mar Saura and Arturo Valls — presented Best Mexican Act
- Álex Martínez and Úrsula Corberó — presented Best Video
- Mario Casas and María Valverde — presented Best New Act
- Sara Carbonero and José Ramón de la Morena — presented Best Latin Act and Best Solo
- Alicia Sanz and Aleix Espargaró — presented Best Album
- Angie Cepeda and Carlos Baute — presented Best Song
