= Los 40 Music Awards 2022 =

Spanish music awards ceremony

LOS40 Music Awards 2022
- Date: November 4, 2022
- Location: WiZink Center, Madrid
- Presented by: Los 40
- Hosted by: Tony Aguilar, Dani Moreno and Cristina Boscá

Highlights
- Most wins: Rosalía, Ava Max and David Guetta (2 each)
- Most nominations: Rosalía (7)
- Website: los40.com/tag/los40_music_awards/a/

Television/radio coverage
- Network: Divinity

The seventeenth edition of LOS40 Music Awards took place at the WiZink Center in Madrid, on November 4, 2022. Rosalía is the most nominated act with seven nominations, followed by Harry Styles.

== Performances ==
The following is a list of artists slated to perform at the award show:

Artist(s)	Song(s)
Rosalía	"La Fama"
Sebastián Yatra	"Melancólicos anónimos" "Dharma" "Tacones rojos"
Chanel	"Toke" "SloMo"
Manuel Turizo	"La Bachata"
Danny Ocean	"Fuera del mercado"
Tiago PZK	"Traductor" "Bzrp Music Sessions, Vol. 48"
Manuel Carrasco	"Hay que vivir el momento" "Qué bonito es querer"
Aitana	"Otra vez" "Formentera" "Mariposas" (with Sangiovanni)
María Becerra	"Automático"
Marc Seguí	"360"
Lola Índigo; María Becerra	"Discoteka"
Leo Rizzi	"Amapolas"
Leiva	"Como si fueras a morir mañana"
Anitta	"Envolver"
Dani Fernández	"Clima tropical" "Dile a los demás"
Morat	"París" "506" (with Juanes)
Yungblud	"Tissues"
Ana Mena	"Quiero decirte" (with Abraham Mateo) "Música ligera" "Las 12"
Ava Max	"Maybe You're the Problem"
David Guetta; Becky Hill	"Remember" "Crazy What Love Can Do" "I'm Good (Blue)"

== Winners and nominees ==
Nominees were revealed on September 27, 2022, at an announcement dinner held in Palma de Mallorca. Winners are first and are in bold.

List of winners and nominees for the LOS40 Music Awards 2022
**Spain**
Best Act	Best New Act
**Dani Fernández**; Aitana; Ana Mena; Lola Índigo; Manuel Carrasco; Rosalía	**Leo Rizzi**; Chanel; DePol; Polo Nández; Samuraï; Walls
Best Album	Best Song
**Rosalía – Motomami**; Dani Fernández – Entre las dudas y el azar; Dani Martín – No, no vuelve; Leiva – Cuando te muerdes el labio; Natalia Lacunza – Tiene que ser para mí; Nil Moliner – Un secreto al que gritar	**Ana Mena – "Música ligera"**; Aitana & Nicki Nicole – "Formentera"; C. Tangana & Nathy Peluso – "Ateo"; Dani Fernández – "Clima tropical"; Nil Moliner – "Libertad"; Rosalía & The Weeknd – "La Fama"
Best Video	Best Live Act
**Marc Seguí – "360"**; Álvaro de Luna – "Levantaremos al sol"; Ana Mena & Belinda – "Las 12"; Belén Aguilera – "Camaleón"; Pol Granch – "De colegio"; Rosalía – "Saoko"	**Lola Índigo**; Beret; Dani Martín; Dvicio; Manuel Carrasco; Rosalía
Best Collaboration	Best Urban Act
**Aitana & Nicki Nicole – "Formentera"**; Abraham Mateo & Ana Mena – "Quiero decirte"; C. Tangana & Nathy Peluso – "Ateo"; Leiva & Natalia Lacunza – "Premio de consolación"; Lérica & Nil Moliner – "La chispa"; Rosalía & The Weeknd – "La Fama"	**Maikel Delacalle**; Adexe & Nau; Bad Gyal; Chema Rivas; Quevedo; St. Petro
Best Tour, Festival or Concert	Del 40 al 1 Award
**Motomami World Tour – Rosalía**; Boombastic; Concert Music Festival; La Cruz del Mapa Tour – Manuel Carrasco; Qué caro es el tiempo – Dani Martín; Sin cantar ni afinar – C. Tangana	**Chanel**; Blas Cantó; Bombai; Lola Índigo; Marlon; Miki Núñez
**International**
Best Act	Best New Act
**Ava Max**; Black Eyed Peas; Camila Cabello; David Guetta; Harry Styles; Imagine Dragons	**Yungblud**; Gayle; Glass Animals; Jaymes Young; Lauren Spencer-Smith; Sam Ryder
Best Album	Best Song
**Harry Styles – Harry's House**; Adele – 30; Camila Cabello – Familia; Ed Sheeran – =; Imagine Dragons – Mercury – Acts 1 & 2; The Weeknd – Dawn FM	**Imagine Dragons – "Enemy"**; Adele – "Easy on Me"; Black Eyed Peas, Shakira & David Guetta – "Don't You Worry"; Camila Cabello & Ed Sheeran – "Bam Bam"; Harry Styles – "As It Was"; Lizzo – "About Damn Time"
Best Video	Best Live Act
**Ava Max – "Maybe You're the Problem"**; Adele – "Oh My God"; David Guetta, Becky Hill & Ella Henderson – "Crazy What Love Can Do"; Harry Styles – "As It Was"; Lil Nas X – "Thats What I Want"; Lizzo – "About Damn Time"	**Dua Lipa**; Black Eyed Peas; Harry Styles; Imagine Dragons; Lil Nas X; Taylor Swift
Best Collaboration	Best Dance Act
**David Guetta, Becky Hill & Ella Henderson – "Crazy What Love Can Do"**; Black Eyed Peas, Shakira & David Guetta – "Don't You Worry"; Camila Cabello & Ed Sheeran – "Bam Bam"; Elton John & Dua Lipa – "Cold Heart"; Swedish House Mafia & The Weeknd – "Moth to a Flame"; Tiësto & Karol G – "Don't Be Shy"	**David Guetta**; Calvin Harris; Lost Frequencies; Purple Disco Machine; Swedish House Mafia; Tiësto
**Global Latin**
Best Act	Best New Act
**Anitta**; Becky G; Danny Ocean; Karol G; Maluma; Shakira	**Tiago PZK**; Emilia; Feid; Mora; Polimá Westcoast; Ryan Castro
Best Album	Best Song
**Sebastián Yatra – Dharma**; Anitta – Versions of Me; Bad Bunny – Un verano sin ti; Becky G – Esquemas; Daddy Yankee – Legendaddy; Justin Quiles – La última promesa	**Manuel Turizo – "La Bachata"**; Bad Bunny – "Tití me preguntó"; Bizarrap & Quevedo – "Bzrp Music Sessions, Vol. 52"; Karol G – "Provenza"; Shakira & Rauw Alejandro – "Te felicito"; Sebastián Yatra – "Tacones rojos"
Best Video	Best Live Act
**Shakira & Rauw Alejandro – "Te felicito"**; Becky G & Karol G – "Mamiii"; Daddy Yankee – "Rumbatón"; Nicky Jam – "Ojos rojos"; Karol G – "Provenza"; Morat & Duki – "París"	**María Becerra**; Camilo; Mau y Ricky; Nathy Peluso; Ozuna; Sebastián Yatra
Best Collaboration	Best Urban Act or Producer
**Morat & Duki – "París"**; Anitta & Justin Quiles – "Envolver Remix"; Bizarrap & Quevedo – "Bzrp Music Sessions, Vol. 52"; Mora & Jhay Cortez – "Memorias"; Shakira & Rauw Alejandro – "Te felicito"; Tiago PZK & Ozuna – "Nos comemos"	**Bizarrap**; Bad Bunny; Justin Quiles; Karol G; Nicky Jam; Rauw Alejandro
Best Tour, Festival or Concert
**De Adentro Pa Afuera Tour – Camilo**; Dharma Tour – Sebastián Yatra; Papi Juancho World Tour 2022 – Maluma; La Bresh; Morat World Tour – Morat; Ya supiste World Tour – Duki
**Golden Music Award**
**Manuel Carrasco**; **Pedro Almodóvar**; **Leiva**; **Juanes**; **Rosalía**
