= Los Premios 40 Principales 2015 =

Spanish music awards ceremony

- Date: December 11, 2015
- Venue: Barclaycard Center
- Hosts: Tony Aguilar, Xavi Martínez, Cristina Boscá, Uri Sàbat, Daniela Blume, Dani Moreno and Gema Hurtado
- Networks: 40 TV, Divinity

This was the tenth edition of Los Premios 40 Principales, the annual awards organized by Spanish music radio Los 40 Principales. It was held on December 11, 2015 in Madrid's Barclaycard Center. The nominees were announced on October 8, 2015.

This is the last edition before the awards were rebranded as Los 40 Music Awards, due to the station shortening its name to just Los 40.

== Performers ==
| Artist(s) | Song(s) |
|---|---|
| Gente de Zona | "La Gozadera" |
| Lost Frequencies; Lea Rue; Janieck Devy | "Are You with Me" "Reality" |
| Walk the Moon | "Shut Up and Dance" |
| Abraham Mateo | "Old School" |
| Macaco | "Hijos de un mismo Dios" |
| Juan Magan; DCS | "Vuelve" |
| Auryn | "Electric" |
| Malú | "Quiero" |
| Dasoul | "Él No Te Da" |
| Álvaro Soler | "El mismo sol" |
| Ellie Goulding | "Love Me Like You Do" "On My Mind" |
| Madcon | "Don't Worry" |
| Pablo Alborán | "La escalera" "Pasos de cero" |
| Sweet California; Madcon | "Down With Ya" |
| Pablo López; Juanes | "Tu enemigo" |
| Jasmine Thompson; Francesco Yates (Note: Robin Schulz was originally slated to perform with them, but did not attend the ceremony due to health issues.) | "Sun Goes Down" (Thompson) "Headlights" "Sugar" (Yates) |
| J Balvin | "Ay Vamos" "Ginza" |

== Awards and nominations ==
The following is the full list of winners and nominees.

=== Best Spanish Act ===
- Pablo Alborán
- Melendi
- Fito & Fitipaldis
- Alejandro Sanz
- Enrique Iglesias

=== Best Spanish New Act ===
- Calum
- Amelie
- Electric Nana
- Álvaro Soler
- Dasoul

=== Best Spanish Song ===
- Melendi - Tocado y hundido
- Alejandro Sanz - Un zombie a la intemperie
- Dvicio - Enamórate
- Juan Magán ft. Paulina Rubio & DCS - Vuelve
- Pablo Alborán - Pasos de cero

=== Best Spanish Video ===
- Pablo Alborán - Pasos de cero
- Efecto Pasillo - Cuando me siento bien
- Alejandro Sanz - Un zombie a la intemperie
- Sweet California - Wonderwoman
- Macaco - Hijos de un mismo dios

=== Best Spanish Album ===
- Alejandro Sanz - Sirope
- Melendi - Un alumno más
- Pablo Alborán - Terral
- Auryn - Circus Avenue
- Fito & Fitipaldis - Huyendo conmigo de mí

=== Best Festival, Tour or Concert in Spain ===
- Pablo Alborán - Tour Terral
- Fito & Fitipaldis - Gira Huyendo conmigo de mí
- Alejandro Sanz - Gira Sirope
- Maldita Nerea - Gira Mira dentro
- Maná - Cama incendiada Tour

=== Best International Act ===
- Ellie Goulding
- Maroon 5
- Ed Sheeran
- Sia
- Taylor Swift

=== Best International New Act ===
- Meghan Trainor
- Sam Smith
- Hozier
- Robin Schulz
- Måns Zelmerlöw

=== Best International Song ===
- Ed Sheeran - "Thinking Out Loud"
- Sia - "Chandelier"
- Mark Ronson ft. Bruno Mars - "Uptown Funk"
- Ellie Goulding - "Love Me Like You Do"
- Sam Smith - "Stay with Me"

=== Best International Video ===
- Sia - "Chandelier"
- Hozier - "Take Me to Church"
- Meghan Trainor - "All About That Bass"
- Taylor Swift - "Shake It Off"
- Madcon - "Don't Worry"

=== Best International Album ===
- Sam Smith - In the Lonely Hour
- Taylor Swift - 1989
- David Guetta - Listen
- Maroon 5 - V
- Sia - 1000 Forms of Fear

=== Best Latin Act ===
- Paulina Rubio
- Nicky Jam
- Maná
- Gente de Zona
- Prince Royce

=== Honorable Mention ===
- Best Spanish rock act: Fito & Fitipaldis
