= LOS40 Music Awards 2019 =

Spanish music awards ceremony

- Date: November 8, 2019
- Location: WiZink Center
- Presented by: Los 40

Highlights
- Most wins: Rosalía (2)
- Most nominations: Leiva, Aitana, Rosalía, Manuel Carrasco, Jonas Brothers (4)
- Website: los40.com/tag/los40_music_awards/a/

Television/radio coverage
- Network: Divinity

The LOS40 Music Awards 2019 was the fourteenth edition of the LOS40 Music Awards, the annual awards organized by Spanish radio station Los 40. It was held on November 8, 2019, in the WiZink Center in Madrid, Spain.

== Performances ==
The full lineup of performers was announced on October 3, 2019, whilst Sam Smith's performance was revealed on October 30.

Artist(s)	Song(s)
Jonas Brothers	"Only Human" "Runaway" (with Sebastián Yatra) "Sucker"
Mabel	"Don't Call Me Up"
Manuel Carrasco	"Déjame ser" "Qué bonito es querer"
Leiva	"Superpoderes" "Como si fueras a morir mañana"
Beret; Sofía Reyes	"Lo siento"
Sofía Reyes; Anitta	"R.I.P"
Anitta	"Get to Know Me"
Sam Smith	"Stay with Me" "Dancing with a Stranger"
Amaral	"Mares Igual Que Tú"
Pedro Capó	"Calma"
Becky G	"Sin Pijama" "Mayores" "Mala Santa"
Dvicio; Taburete	"5 Sentidos"
Vanesa Martín	"De Tus Ojos"
Ava Max	"Sweet but Psycho"
Don Patricio	"Contando lunares"
Lola Indigo; Don Patricio	"Lola Bunny"
Aitana; Lola Indigo	"Me Quedo" "Vas a quedarte"
Nicky Jam	"Atrévete" "X"
Pablo Alborán; Ava Max	"Tabú"
Rosalía	"Dios nos libre del dinero"

== Awards and nominations ==
Nominations were announced on September 12, 2019.

Artist of the Year

- Leiva
- Aitana
- Manuel Carrasco
- Rosalía
- David Bisbal

New Artist of the Year

- Beret
- Lola Indigo
- Pol Granch
- Sinsinati
- Don Patricio

Album of the Year

- Rosalía - El mal querer
- Manuel Carrasco - La cruz del mapa
- Blas Cantó - Complicado
- Leiva - Nuclear
- Dani Fernández - Incendios

Song of the Year

- Dvicio & Taburete - 5 sentidos
- Beret - Lo siento
- Alejandro Sanz & Camila Cabello - Mi Persona Favorita
- Aitana - Vas a quedarte
- Manuel Carrasco - Qué bonito es querer

Video of the Year

- Leiva - No te preocupes por mí
- Rosalía, J Balvin & El Guincho - Con altura
- Vanesa Martín - De tus ojos
- Macaco - Bailo la pena
- Aitana & Lola Indigo - Me quedo

Festival, Tour or Concert of the Year

- Manuel Carrasco - Gira La cruz del mapa
- Alejandro Sanz - #LaGira
- Vanesa Martín - Gira Todas las mujeres que habitan en mí
- Leiva - Tour Nuclear
- A Summer Story Festival

International Artist of the Year

- Rita Ora
- Jonas Brothers
- Sam Smith
- Miley Cyrus
- Ed Sheeran

International New Artist of the Year

- Ava Max
- Panic! at the Disco
- Mabel
- Lil Nas X
- Billie Eilish

International Album of the Year

- Jonas Brothers - Happiness Begins
- Ed Sheeran - No.6 Collaborations Project
- Mark Ronson - Late Night Feelings
- Billie Eilish - When We All Fall Asleep, Where Do We Go?
- Ariana Grande - Thank U, Next

International Song of the Year

- Ava Max - Sweet but Psycho
- Shawn Mendes & Camila Cabello - Señorita
- Panic! at the Disco - High Hopes
- Jonas Brothers - Sucker
- Ed Sheeran & Justin Bieber - I Don't Care

International Video of the Year

- Mark Ronson & Miley Cyrus - Nothing Breaks Like a Heart
- Sofía Reyes feat. Rita Ora & Anitta - R.I.P.
- Billie Eilish - Bad Guy
- Jonas Brothers - Sucker
- Mabel - Don't Call Me Up

LOS40 Urban Award

- J Balvin
- Juan Magan
- Daddy Yankee
- Anitta
- Nicky Jam

LOS40 Global Show Award

- Rosalía, J Balvin & El Guincho - Con altura
- Pedro Capó & Farruko - Calma (Remix)
- Paulo Londra - Adán y Eva
- Daddy Yankee & Snow - Con Calma
- DJ Snake feat. Selena Gomez, Ozuna & Cardi B - Taki Taki

Del 40 al 1 Artist Award

- Aitana
- Bombai
- Ana Guerra
- Alfred García
- Morat

Golden Music Awards

- Sam Smith
- Amaral
- Laura Pausini
- Estopa

== Incidents ==
Actor César Vicente appeared on the stage to present the award for the Song of the Year in an apparent state of inebriation. He was hardly able to read the script and called for "those who come from an after" to say hello. Fellow actress Ester Expósito, who was co-presenting the award with him, tried to get him to focus on the task at hand as the crowd in attendance booed Vicente off the stage. At another point in the show, Javier Calvo admitting to having "drunk a lot" when he was presenting an award alongside partner Javier Ambrossi. César Vicente later attributed it to his "nerves" and admitted he had drunk "3 [glasses of] wine", while at the same time denied accusations of drug consumption.

The ceremony was also criticized for constant sound issues, the most notable one occurring during Sofía Reyes' performance when the show had to be stopped for five minutes because two tracks were playing at the same time.
