= Los Premios 40 Principales 2013 =

Spanish music awards ceremony

- Date: December 12, 2013
- Venue: Palacio de Deportes de la Comunidad de Madrid
- Hosted by: Tony Aguilar, Cristina Boscá, Xavi Rodríguez, Uri Sàbat, Daniela Blume and María Lama
- Aired on: Divinity, 40TV

== Performers ==
Artist(s)	Song(s)
Ricky Martin	"Come with Me"
Malú	"Vuelvo a verte" "A prueba de ti"
Efecto Pasillo	"No importa que llueva"
James Arthur	"Impossible" "You're Nobody 'til Somebody Loves You"
Auryn	"Heartbreaker"
Antonio Orozco	"Llegará"
Naughty Boy	"La La La"
Melendi	"Tu jardín con enanitos"
Dreamland cast	"I Believe in Dreams"
Jesse & Joy; Pablo Alborán	"¡Corre!" (Jesse & Joy) "La de la mala suerte" "Éxtasis" (Alborán)
Olly Murs	"Troublemaker" "Hand on Heart" (with Edurne)
Dani Martín	"Cero"
Estopa	"Como Camarón"
Imagine Dragons	"It's Time" "On Top of the World"
Pablo López	"Vi"
John Newman	"Cheating" "Love Me Again"

== Awards ==
=== Best Spanish Act ===
- Melendi
- Auryn
- Dani Martín
- Pablo Alborán
- Malú

=== Best Spanish New Act ===
- Marien Baker
- Xriz
- Wally López
- Pablo López
- El Viaje de Elliot

=== Best Spanish Video ===
- Dani Martín — Cero
- Auryn — Make My Day
- Soraya — Con fuego
- Pablo Alborán — Quién
- Malú — A prueba de ti

=== Best Spanish Festival, Tour or Concert ===
- Alejandro Sanz — Gira La música no se toca
- Melendi — Gira Lágrimas desordenadas
- 40 Hot Mix Road Show
- Pablo Alborán — Gira 2013
- Dcode Festival

=== Best Spanish Album ===
- Pablo Alborán — Tanto
- Dani Martín — Dani Martín
- Melendi — Lágrimas desordenadas
- Malú — Dual
- Efecto Pasillo — El misterioso caso de...

=== Best Spanish Song ===
- Alejandro Sanz — Mi marciana
- Melendi — Tu jardín con enanitos
- Dani Martín — Cero
- Malú & Pablo Alborán — Vuelvo a verte
- Pablo Alborán — Tanto

=== Best International Act ===
- Bruno Mars
- One Direction
- Pink
- Rihanna
- Avicii

=== Best International Album ===
- One Direction — Take Me Home
- Rihanna — Unapologetic
- Avicii — True
- Pink — The Truth About Love
- Passenger — All the Little Lights

=== Best International Song ===
- James Arthur — Impossible
- Bruno Mars — Locked Out of Heaven
- Avicii — Wake Me Up
- Daft Punk — Get Lucky
- Robin Thicke — Blurred Lines

=== Best International New Act ===
- John Newman
- James Arthur
- Passenger
- The Lumineers
- Macklemore & Ryan Lewis

=== Best Latin Act ===
- Ricky Martin
- Jesse & Joy
- Pitbull
- Jennifer Lopez
- Cali & El Dandee

=== Best International Video ===
- Avicii — Wake Me Up
- Naughty Boy & Sam Smith — La La La
- Macklemore & Ryan Lewis — Can't Hold Us
- John Newman — Love Me Again
- Bruno Mars — Locked Out of Heaven

=== Special awards ===
- Best rock band: Imagine Dragons
- Career achievement award : Estopa
- Most versatile artist: Dani Martín
