= Estopa =

Spanish rock & rumba duo

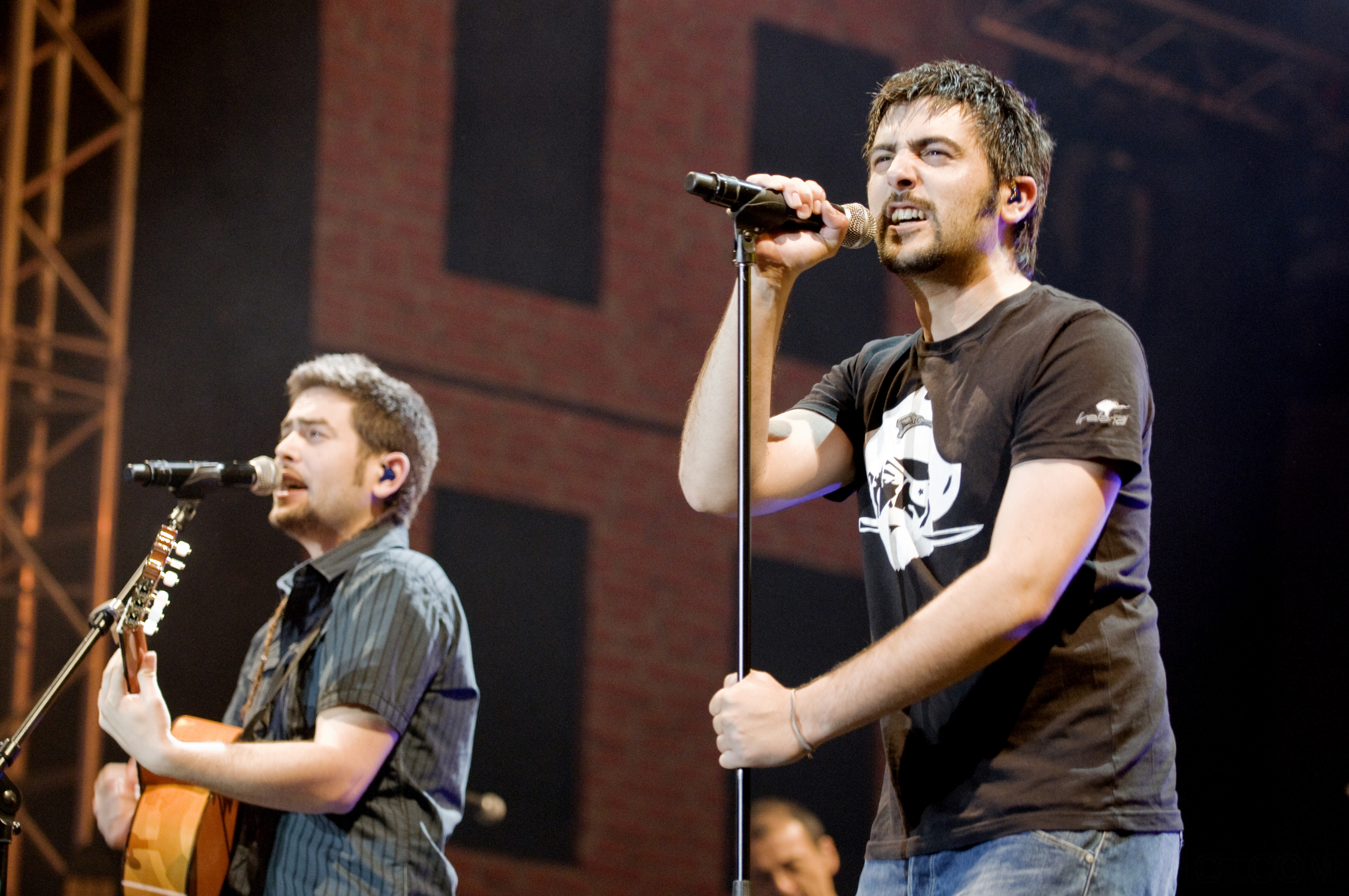
- Estopa performing in 2008

Background information
- Origin: Cornellà de Llobregat, Catalonia, Spain
- Genres: Catalan rumba, folk rock, alternative rock
- Years active: 1998–present
- Label: Sony Music
- Members: David Muñoz Calvo; José Manuel Muñoz Calvo
- Website: estopa.com

Estopa is a Spanish rock/rumba duo from Cornellà de Llobregat, Spain. Their songs "El Run Run" and "Cuando Amanece" reached number one on Billboard's chart in Spain, and "Con La Mano Levanta" reached number four. The band consists of brothers José and David Muñoz; their style includes rock, rumba, and flamenco genres. The band has stated, "We don't like to be easily categorized."

Estopa made a cameo appearance in the Spanish film The 4th Floor. They have performed with other popular Spanish artists such as Rosario Flores and Macaco.

== Band history ==
Brothers José Muñoz and David Muñoz were born 1978 and 1976 respectively in Cornellà de Llobregat, a suburb of Barcelona to parents from Extremadura (South Western Spain). The brothers grew up listening to Los Chichos, Los Chunguitos, and Bordón on trips with their parents from Cornellà to the Extremaduran village of Zarza Capilla, where their family was originally from.

José and David attended college for some time before quitting their studies; they worked for a factory manufacturing automobile parts for the company SEAT; the band name "Estopa" comes from the expression used by their boss to keep everybody on task, "Dale estopa a la maquina". There, they began composing songs and began to play in local bars. After playing a song for the executives at BMG Music España, Estopa was given a record deal. Their first album, "Estopa," was released 19 October 1999 and one of its songs, "La Raja de Tu Falda," became an instant hit. Other songs such as "Tu Calorro," "Suma y Sigue," and "El del Medio de los Chichos" (an ode to the band Los Chichos), have also become fan favorites.

Estopa followed "Estopa" with their next album "Destrangis" in 2001, which sold 250,000 copies in its first two weeks. The album was welcomed by fans and led to a tour of Latin America. The Muñoz brothers later released a second Destrangis album including three live bonus tracks. That was entitled "Más Destrangis." After two years, their fourth album, "¿La Calle es Tuya?" was released in 2004. Though it did not receive such good ratings as "Estopa" and "Destrangis", it became an immediate hit with songs like "Fuente de Energía" and "Apagón". The band experimented with rock-orientated sounds on this album, while maintaining the rumba and flamenco sounds that had appeared on their first two albums.

In late 2005, the band released their highly anticipated album "Voces de Ultrarumba". The disc includes older songs written by the brothers that Estopa could not record due to limits on each disc. The songs "No Quiero Verla Más" and "Malabares" were particularly popular. The album was released as a special, dual-disc CD/DVD set. On 26 February 2008 Estopa released their fifth studio album, titled "Allenrok". They worked on a music video for "Voces de Ultrarumba"'s song, "Lunes".

This was followed by "Estopa X Anniversarivm" released in November 2009. That album was released to celebrate Estopa's tenth anniversary and included collaborations on their most successful songs, including "El Run Run" with Rosario and "Ya No Me Acuerdo" with Ana Belen. The second disc was made up of remixed versions of a number of their previous hits, such as "Cuando Cae La Luna" and "Cuando Amanece". Around the same time Estopa released two DVDs. The first included 24 videoclips from the previous 10 years of Estopa, including some from live performances. The second DVD started with a TV movie "Regreso a la española", by Andreu Buenafuente, which involved numerous interviews with friends colleagues of the Muñoz brothers. The presenter also explained the roots of Estopa and showed a clip of their performance at the bar "La Española" in Cornellá from 27 September 2009. The disc also included 50 minutes of Estopa's first big performance on 2 December 2000 at the Palacio de los Deportes de Madrid, which had previously only been released on VHS.

2011 saw the release of "Estopa 2.0". It was the second studio album to be produced by the brothers themselves. In its first week of release the album reached number 1 in the Spanish album chart with 40,000 copies sold. Three months later the album went double platinum with 80,000 copies sold. The first single from the album was "La Primavera".

The 8th album was "Esto es Estopa", released on 17 February 2014, involving acoustic versions of their most successful songs.

In October 2015 Estopa released their 9th studio album "Rumba a lo Desconocido". In June and July 2015 they released their first two singles from the album "Pastillas Para Dormir" and "Nadie Sabe". In September three further singles were released: "Estatua de Sal", "Ando Buscando" and "Gafas de Rosa".

On 22 October 2015 Estopa began their "Rumba a lo Desconocido" tour. They previously performed at the Gibraltar Music Festival on 5 September 2015. The tour started in Bogota, Colombia and proceeded to New York, Miami, Quito, Santiago de Chile (two performances), Cordoba (Argentina), Rosario (Argentina), Buenos Aires, Malaga, Granada, Barcelona, Zaragoza, Bilbao, Valencia and Madrid.

On 31 May 2019 Estopa released the first single from their new album; both the single and the album are named "Fuego". The album "Fuego" will be released on 18 October 2019. The second single from the album, "El Último Renglón", was released on 24 June 2019. In December 2020, they released a single in collaboration with Amaral, "Despertar".

== Members ==
José Muñoz is the younger brother, born in 1978. He plays guitar and sings backing vocals, as well as lead vocals on a few songs. David Muñoz is the older brother, born in 1976. He is the lead singer and also plays some guitar.

== Discography ==
=== Studio albums ===
List of studio albums, with selected chart positions and certifications
Title	Album details	Peak chart positions	Sales	Certifications
Title	Album details	SPA	Sales	Certifications
Estopa	Released: 11 October 1999; Label: Sony Music	1	SPA: 1.2 million	IFPI Europe: Platinum; SPA: 11× Platinum
Destrangis	Released: 26 September 2001; Label: Sony Music	1	Worldwide: 800,000; SPA: 570,000	SPA: 5× Platinum
¿La Calle Es Tuya?	Released: 10 June 2004; Label: Sony Music	1	SPA: 400,000	SPA: 4× Platinum
Voces de Ultrarumba	Released: 15 December 2005; Label: Sony Music	1	SPA: 320,000	SPA: 4× Platinum
Allenrok	Released: 26 February 2008; Label: Sony Music	1	SPA: 160,000	SPA: 2× Platinum
X-Anniversarium	Released: 17 November 2009; Label: Sony Music	1	SPA: 120,000	SPA: 2× Platinum
Estopa 2.0	Released: 21 November 2011; Label: Sony Music	1	SPA: 80,000	SPA: 2× Platinum
Esto es Estopa	Released: 17 February 2014; Label: Sony Music	1		
Rumba a lo Desconocido	Released: 2 October 2015; Label: Sony Music	1		
Fuego	Released: 18 October 2019; Label: Sony Music	1		
Estopía	Released: 15 March 2024; Label: Sony Music	1		

== Filmography ==
=== Composer ===
- Cançons per no oblidar, el disc de la Marató (2005) (Song "Ya no me acuerdo")
- Voces de ultrarumba (2005)
- Tapas (2005) (Song "Ya no me acuerdo")
- Nuestra mejor canción (2004) (Song "La raja de tu falda")
- Torapia (2004) (Song "Pastillas de freno")
- Gira destrangis (2004)
- The 4th Floor (2003) (Songs "Nasío pa la alegría" and "Vino tinto")
- Más destrangis (2002)
- Fugitivas (2000) (Song "Tan solo")

== See also ==
- Rock en Español
