= LOS40 Music Awards 2018 =

Spanish music awards ceremony

- Date: November 2, 2018
- Location: WiZink Center
- Presented by: Los 40
- Hosted by: Tony Aguilar; Dani Moreno; Cristina Boscá

Highlights
- Most wins: Dua Lipa (3)
- Most nominations: Dua Lipa, Pablo Alborán (5)
- Website: los40.com/tag/los40_music_awards/a/

Television/radio coverage
- Network: Divinity

The LOS40 Music Awards 2018 was the thirteenth edition of the LOS40 Music Awards, the annual awards organized by Spanish radio station Los 40. It was held on November 2, 2018, in the WiZink Center in Madrid, Spain.

== Performances ==
| Artist(s) | Song(s) |
|---|---|
| David Guetta; Anne-Marie; Bebe Rexha | "Don't Leave Me Alone" (Guetta & Anne-Marie) "Say My Name" (Guetta & Rexha) "Hey Mama" (Guetta & Rexha) |
| Eleni Foureira | "Fuego" |
| Melendi | "Déjala que baile" |
| Sofía Reyes | "1, 2, 3" |
| Dani Martín | "Dieciocho" |
| Piso 21 | "Déjala Que Vuelva" |
| Pablo López | "El Patio" |
| David Bisbal | "Mi princesa" "Díganle" "Esclavo de sus besos" "Ave María" "A partir de hoy" "Perdón" |
| Bazzi | "Beautiful" |
| Rosalía | "Malamente" |
| Ana Guerra; Aitana | "Ni la hora" (Ana Guerra) "Lo malo" "Teléfono" (Aitana) |
| Tom Walker | "Leave a Light On" |
| Bebe Rexha | "I Got You" "I'm a Mess" |
| Malú | "Todos los secretos" |
| Anne-Marie | "2002" "Friends" |
| Pablo Alborán | "La llave" (with Piso 21) "Prometo" |
| Dua Lipa | "Homesick" (with Pablo Alborán) "IDGAF" "New Rules" |

== Appearing ==
- David Broncano — off-stage interviewer
- Bely Basarte & David Rees — pre-taped performance of a medley of nominated songs
- María Escoté & Palomo Spain — presented New Artist of the Year and Tour of the Year
- Leiva — guest drummer during Dani Martín's performance
- Juana Acosta & Miguel Bernardeau — presented International Video of the Year and Best Latin Artist
- Eleni Foureira & Axel — presented LOS40 Global Show Award and Video of the Year
- Vanesa Martín & Lydia Bosch — presented International New Artist of the Year and Album of the Year
- Rosalía & Brays Efe — presented International Artist of the Year and Artist of the Year
- Aitana & Ana Guerra — presented International Album of the Year
- Lara Álvarez & Álvaro Soler — presented International Song of the Year
- Irene Montalà & Álvaro Rico — presented Song of the Year

== Awards and nominations ==
Nominations were announced on September 13, 2018.

Artist of the Year

- Pablo Alborán
- Dani Martín
- Melendi
- Pablo López
- Álvaro Soler

New Artist of the Year

- Reyko
- Dani Fernández
- Aitana & Ana Guerra
- Maico
- Brisa Fenoy

Album of the Year

- Pablo Alborán - Prometo
- David Otero - 1980
- Dani Martín - Grandes éxitos y pequeños desastres
- Melendi - Ahora
- Pablo López - Camino, fuego y libertad

Song of the Year

- Pablo López - El patio
- Leiva - La llamada
- Pablo Alborán - No vaya a ser
- Aitana & Ana Guerra - Lo malo
- Malú - Invisible

Video of the Year

- Pablo Alborán - No vaya a ser
- Melendi feat. Alejandro Sanz - Déjala que baile
- Pablo López - El patio
- Blas Cantó - Él no soy yo
- Álvaro Soler - La cintura

International Artist of the Year

- Ed Sheeran
- Shawn Mendes
- Dua Lipa
- Bruno Mars
- Selena Gomez

International New Artist of the Year

- Liam Payne
- Tom Walker
- Post Malone
- Marshmello
- Anne-Marie

International Album of the Year

- Shawn Mendes - Shawn Mendes
- Charlie Puth - Voicenotes
- Camila Cabello - Camila
- Dua Lipa - Dua Lipa
- Post Malone - Beerbongs & Bentleys

International Song of the Year

- Ed Sheeran & Beyoncé - Perfect
- Calvin Harris & Dua Lipa - One Kiss
- Zayn feat. Sia - Dusk Till Dawn
- Dua Lipa - New Rules
- Camila Cabello - Havana

International Video of the Year

- Dua Lipa - New Rules
- Nicky Jam & J Balvin - X
- David Guetta feat. Sia - Flames
- Liam Payne feat. J Balvin - Familiar
- The Carters - Apeshit

Best Latin Artist

- J Balvin
- Morat
- Maluma
- Daddy Yankee
- Nicky Jam

Tour of the Year

- Pablo Alborán - Tour Prometo
- Dani Martín - Gira Grandes éxitos y pequeños desastres
- Melendi - Ahora Tour
- Pablo López - Tour Santa Libertad
- Shakira - El Dorado World Tour

Golden Music Awards

- David Guetta
- Luz Casal
- David Bisbal
- Melendi

LOS40 Global Show Award

- Daddy Yankee - Dura
- Maluma - Corazón
- Nicky Jam & J Balvin - X
- Reik feat. Ozuna & Wisin - Me niego
- Piso 21 - La vida sin ti
