= Efecto Pasillo =

Spanish alternative and pop rock band

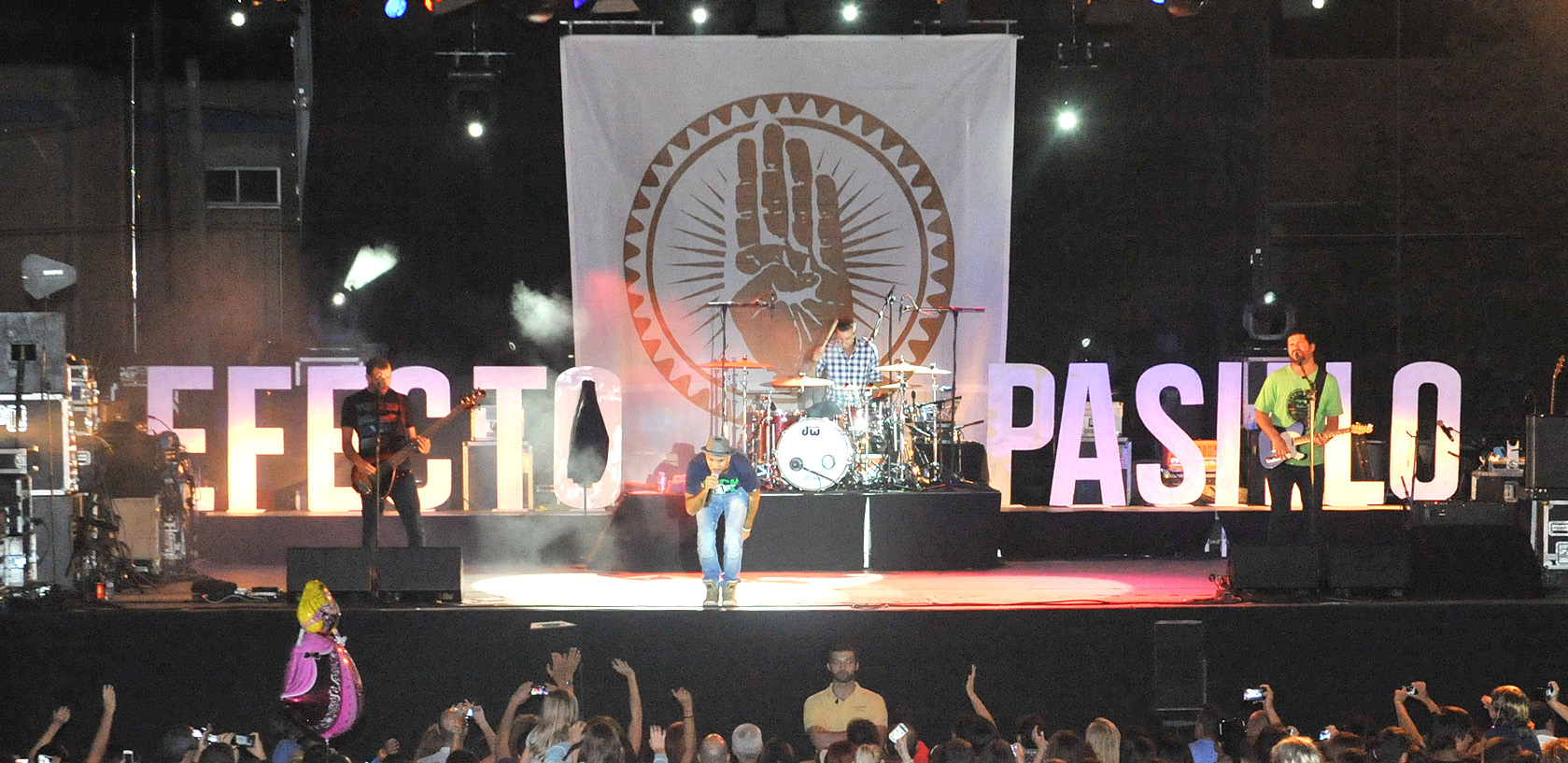
- Efecto Pasillo performing at Festa Major in 2014

Background information
- Origin: Gran Canaria; Canary Islands, Spain
- Genres: Alternative rock Pop rock Funk rock Latin pop
- Years active: 2007-present
- Label: Vicious Records
- Members: Iván Torres; Javier Moreno; Nau Barreto; Arturo Sosa
- Website: www.efectopasillo.com

Efecto Pasillo is a Spanish alternative rock/pop rock band formed in the Canary Islands. Their music also includes elements of funk and Latin sounds.

== History ==
=== Beginnings ===
Efecto Pasillo started as a band in 2007, winning a music band competition. After that they recorded their first demo, En el aire, which was played on several local radio stations. Music producer Tato Latorre traveled from Barcelona to the Canary Islands to listen to them live in a concert, and he was so impressed that he took the band under his wing.

=== Self-titled debut album ===
In early 2010 they launched Efecto Pasillo, their self-titled debut album. Their debut single, Chacho, made them famous at a national level, to the point they were hand-picked by Hombres G as the opening act for their national tour. This turned Efecto Pasillo into one of the most important bands in the Canary Islands.

By that time the band had already landed deals with label Vicious Records and promoting agency M2 Music Group. Also on 2010 they won the "Breakout Band of the Year" award in Gran Canaria.

=== 2010-present ===
Thanks to the success of Chacho, they toured Spain playing live on national televisions such as Televisión Española, Antena 3, laSexta or Televisió de Catalunya. Antena 3 also picked their track Pan y mantequilla as the "song of the summer" in 2012. This song was the first single of their next album, El misterioso caso de...

Pan y mantequilla landed the band their first two nominations at Los Premios 40 Principales, being contenders to Best Spanish New Artist and Best Spanish Song, which they ultimately lost out to Auryn and Pablo Alborán, respectively. They would also get a shot at the Best Spanish Album award in the 2013 edition, losing again to Alborán.

== Members ==
- Iván Torres - vocals
- Javier Moreno - drums
- Nau Barreto - guitar
- Arturo Sosa - bass

== Discography ==
=== Albums ===
Year	Album title	Launched	Label
2010	Efecto Pasillo	February 2010	Vicious
2013	El misterioso caso de...	February 5, 2013	Darlalata Music
2015	Tiembla La Tierra	June 23, 2015	Darlalata Music
2017	Barrio Las Banderas	September 8, 2017	Warner Music

=== Singles ===
Year	Track	Charts			Album
Year	Track	ESP Sales	ESP Radio airplay	ESP Los 40	Album
2009	"Chacho"	-	-	-	Efecto Pasillo
2010	"Chocolate y vainilla	-	-	-	Efecto Pasillo
2010	"Un poquito más de ti" (featuring Mensey)	-	-	-	Efecto Pasillo
2012	"Pan y mantequilla"	15	9	1	El misterioso caso de...
2013	"No importa que llueva"	27	9	1	El misterioso caso de...
2013	"Funketón"	-	27	10	El misterioso caso de...
2013	"Hecho con tus sueños" (featuring Leire Martínez)	2	11	30	No album
2014	"Me sabe bien"	-	-	-	Soundtrack for Pancho: el perro millonario
2015	"Cuando me siento bien"	54	-	8	Tiembla la tierra
2017	"Carita de buena"	95	1	19	Barrio Las Banderas
2018	"Salvajes irracionales"	-	-	19	Barrio Las Banderas

== See also ==
- Music of Spain
