= Dani Martín (singer) =

Spanish singer (born 1977)

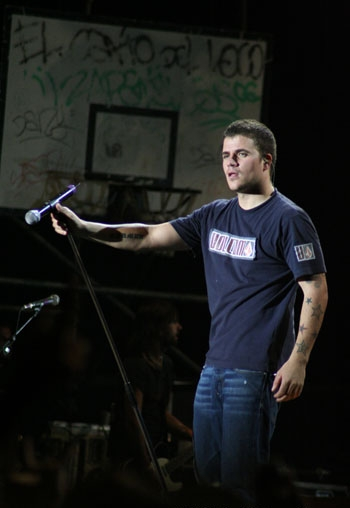
- Dani Martín performing in 2006

Background information
- Born: Daniel Martín García; 19 February 1977 (age 49)
- Origin: Madrid, Spain
- Genres: Rock; pop rock
- Occupations: Singer, actor
- Years active: 1994–present
- Label: Sony Music
- Website: danimartin.com.es

Daniel Martín García (born 19 February 1977) is a Spanish singer. He was the vocalist of the pop punk band El Canto del Loco (ECDL).

== Biography ==
He was born on 19 February 1977 in Alcobendas, a city in the province of Madrid.

When he was a child, he used to imitate his favorite artists in the living room and started to dream about creating his own band. As he was not a really good student, he started to work with his father and, at the same time, he began to study at the Drama School William Layton. Later, Dani decided to attend prestigious Drama School Cristina Rota, where he got his first jobs as a stage actor. The first time he appeared on television was with Martes y 13 in a show prepared for New Year's Eve. Then, he presented a program called Ponte las Pilas.

He has acted in several films, such as Sirenas by Fernando Leon de Aranoa, Sin vergüenza by Joaquín Oristrell, Auger Carlos Villaverde, Manuel Sanabria, and Yo soy la Juani by Bigas Luna. He was also acted in TV series such as Al salir de clase, Policías, en el corazón de la calle, Raquel busca su sitio, Petra Delicado, 7 vidas, Hospital Central, Los hombres de Paco and a small role in the movie Broken Embraces, directed by Pedro Almodóvar. In 2000, Dani Martin created the music band El Canto del Loco and he started to combine his job as an actor with his new job as a singer. Between 2007 and 2008 he starred in a series called Cuenta Atrás, in which he played the role of an impulsive police chief inspector called Paul Corso. Dani Martin decided to leave the series in order to devote himself completely to the group El Canto del Loco.

Martín had a highly publicized romantic relationship with singer Amaia Montero from 2000 to 2007, which received significant media attention in Spain.

== Discography ==
=== Albums ===
with El Canto del Loco

- 2000: El Canto del Loco
- 2002: A contracorriente
- 2003: Estados de ánimo
- 2005: Zapatillas
- 2008: Personas
- 2009: Radio la colifata presenta: El Canto del Loco

Solo

- 2010: Pequeño
- 2011: Pequeño... (Tesoro), Las Maquetas de Pequeño
- 2013: Dani Martín
- 2016: La Montaña Rusa
- 2017: Grandes Éxitos y Pequeños Desastres
- 2020: Lo Que Me Dé La Gana
- 2021: No, no Vuelve
- 2024: El último día de nuestras vidas

=== Singles ===
- 2010: "16 añitos"
- 2010: "Mira la vida"
- 2011: "Mi lamento" (a tribute to his sister, who died on 2009 at the age of 34)
- 2011: "Cero"
- 2013: "Caminar"
- 2013: "Qué bonita la vida"
- 2014: "Emocional"
- 2014: "Mi Teatro"
- 2016: "Las ganas"
- 2016: "Los charcos"
- 2018: "Dieciocho"
- 2019: "La mentira"
- 2020: "Los huesos" (ft. Juanes)
- 2021: "Portales"
- 2021: "No, no vuelve"
- 2024: "Ester Expósito"
- 2025: "El último día de nuestras vidas"

== Filmography ==
=== Films ===
- El 92 cava con todo (1991)
- Sirenas (1994)
- Perdón, perdón (1998)
- Sobreviviré (1999)
- Sin vergüenza (2001)
- After (2001)
- I Love You Baby (2001)
- School of Rock (2003, European Spanish dub)
- Sinfín (2005)
- Torrente 3: El protector (2005)
- Yo soy la Juani (2006)
- El Canto del Loco: la película (2009)
- Los Abrazos Rotos (2009)

=== Television ===
- Ponte las pilas (1991–1992)
- ¡Ay, Señor, Señor! (1 episode, 1995)
- Al salir de clase (2 episodes, 1998)
- El comisario (1 episodio, 1999)
- Policías, en el corazón de la calle (1 episode, 2000)
- Hospital Central (1 episode, 2000)
- Raquel busca su sitio (15 episodes, 2000)
- 7 vidas (1 episodio, 2004)
- Latrelevisión (1 episodio, 2005)
- Cuenta atrás (2007–2008)
- Los hombres de Paco (2009)
