= Los Premios 40 Principales 2012 =

Spanish music awards ceremony

The 2012 event was the seventh edition of Los Premios 40 Principales, created by Los 40 Principales to honor the best in Spanish and international music. For the first time, Los Premios 40 Principales América was run as a separate event.

== Performers ==
Artist(s)	Song(s)
Pitbull	"Sube la mano p'arriba" "Don't Stop the Party"
Cali & El Dandee	"Yo te esperaré" "No hay dos sin tres (Gol)"
La Oreja de Van Gogh	"La niña que llora en tus fiestas" "Otra vez me has sacado a bailar"
Auryn	"Don't Give Up My Game"
Pablo Alborán	"Te he echado de menos" "Tanto"
José de Rico; Henry Mendez	"Rayos de sol" "Noche de estrellas"
Alejandro Sanz	"No me compares" "Mi marciana" (with Leire Martínez, Chila Lynn and Bebe)
The Lion King cast	"He Lives in You"
Maldita Nerea	"La respuesta no es la huida" "¿No podíamos ser agua?"
Alicia Keys	"New Day" "Girl on Fire" "Brand New Me" "Looking for Paradise" (with Alejandro Sanz)
Taylor Swift	"Love Story" "We Are Never Ever Getting Back Together"
David Guetta	"Titanium" "She Wolf (Falling to Pieces)" "Just One Last Time" (with Taped Rai)

== Awards ==
=== Best Song ===
- Efecto Pasillo — "Pan y Mantequilla"
- Jose de Rico (featuring Henry Mendez) — "Rayos de sol"
- Alejandro Sanz — "Se Vende"
- Pablo Alborán — "Te He Echado de Menos"
- Juan Magan (featuring Belinda) — "Te Voy a Esperar"

=== Best Video ===
- Carlos Jean — "BlackStar"
- La Oreja de Van Gogh — "Cometas Por El Cielo"
- Macaco — "Love Is The Only Way"
- Alejandro Sanz — "No Me Compares"
- Pablo Alborán — "Te He Echado de Menos"

=== Best Album ===
- Estopa — Estopa 2.0
- Macaco — El Murmullo del Fuego
- Pablo Alborán — En Acústico
- Auryn — Endless Road, 7058 (Upcoming)
- Alejandro Sanz — La Música No Se Toca

=== Best Act ===
- Alejandro Sanz
- Estopa
- Macaco
- Melendi
- Pablo Alborán

=== Best New Act ===
- Auryn
- Chila Lynn
- Efecto Pasillo
- Lagarto Amarillo
- Xuso Jones

=== Best Tour ===
- Carlos Jean — Live Experience Tour 2012
- Estopa — Estopa: Tour 2.0
- La Oreja de Van Gogh — Tour 2012
- Maldita Nerea — Gira Mucho + Fácil
- Melendi — Tour 2012

=== Best Latin Song ===
- Crossfire — "Lady"
- Cali & El Dandee (featuring David Bisbal) — "No Hay 2 Sin 3 (Gol)"
- Tacabro — "Tacata'"
- Sie7e — "Tengo Tu Love"
- Cali & El Dandee — "Yo Te Esperaré"

=== Best Latin Act ===
- Cali & El Dandee
- Jennifer Lopez
- Juanes
- Pitbull
- Shakira

=== Best International Song ===
- Loreen — "Euphoria"
- Carly Rae Jepsen — "Call Me Maybe"
- Maroon 5 (featuring Christina Aguilera) — "Moves like Jagger"
- Gotye (featuring Kimbra) — "Somebody That I Used to Know"
- Adele — "Someone like You"

=== Best International Album ===
- Coldplay — Mylo Xyloto
- David Guetta — Nothing but the Beat 2.0
- Maroon 5 — Overexposed
- Rihanna — Talk That Talk
- Flo Rida — Wild Ones

=== Best International Act ===
- Alicia Keys
- David Guetta
- Flo Rida
- Maroon 5
- Taylor Swift

=== Best International New Act ===
- Carly Rae Jepsen
- Fun
- Gotye
- Nicki Minaj
- One Direction

=== Special awards ===
- Best 21st Century's Spanish Artist: Alejandro Sanz
- Best last decade's American singer-songwriter : Alicia Keys
- Most influential artist and producer of the Latin World: Pitbull

== Premios 40 Principales America ==
Los Premios 40 Principales América is Latin American version of Los Premios 40 Principales. The first edition for awards show was held on November 30, 2012, in Veracruz, Mexico.

=== Best Song ===
- Jesse & Joy — "¡Corre!"
- Cali & El Dandee — "Yo Te Esperaré"
- Alejandro Sanz — "No Me Compares"
- Daddy Yankee — "Lovumba"
- J Alvarez — "La Pregunta"

=== Best Album ===
- Juanes — Juanes MTV Unplugged
- Wisin & Yandel — Líderes
- Daddy Yankee — Prestige
- Jesse & Joy — ¿Con Quién Se Queda El Perro?
- Zoé — MTV Unplugged/Música de Fondo

=== Best Pop Act ===
- Reik
- Tan Biónica
- El Tambor de la Tribu
- Jesse & Joy
- Shakira

=== Best Urban Act ===
- Wisin & Yandel
- Daddy Yankee
- Don Omar
- Cali & El Dandee
- Pitbull

=== Best North Act ===
- León Larregui
- Vazquez Sounds
- Eme 15
- Enjambre
- Río Roma

=== Best Central Act ===
- Iván Barrios
- Percance
- El Tambor de la Tribu
- Gánster
- Ale Fernández y la Suite Estéreo

=== Best South Act ===
- Tan Biónica
- Cali & El Dandee
- Denise Rosenthal
- Buxxi
- Maluma

=== Best International Song ===
- Michel Teló — "Ai Se Eu Te Pego"
- Maroon 5 (featuring Wiz Khalifa) — "Payphone"
- Gotye (featuring Kimbra) — "Somebody That I Used to Know"
- Rihanna — "Where Have You Been"
- Carly Rae Jepsen — "Call Me Maybe"

=== Best International Act ===
- One Direction
- Maroon 5
- Rihanna
- Katy Perry
- Adele

=== Best International New Act ===
- One Direction
- Gotye
- Michel Teló
- Carly Rae Jepsen
- Calvin Harris

=== Best International Dance Act ===
- David Guetta
- Calvin Harris
- Avicii
- Flo Rida
- LMFAO
