= Pereza =

Spanish rock band

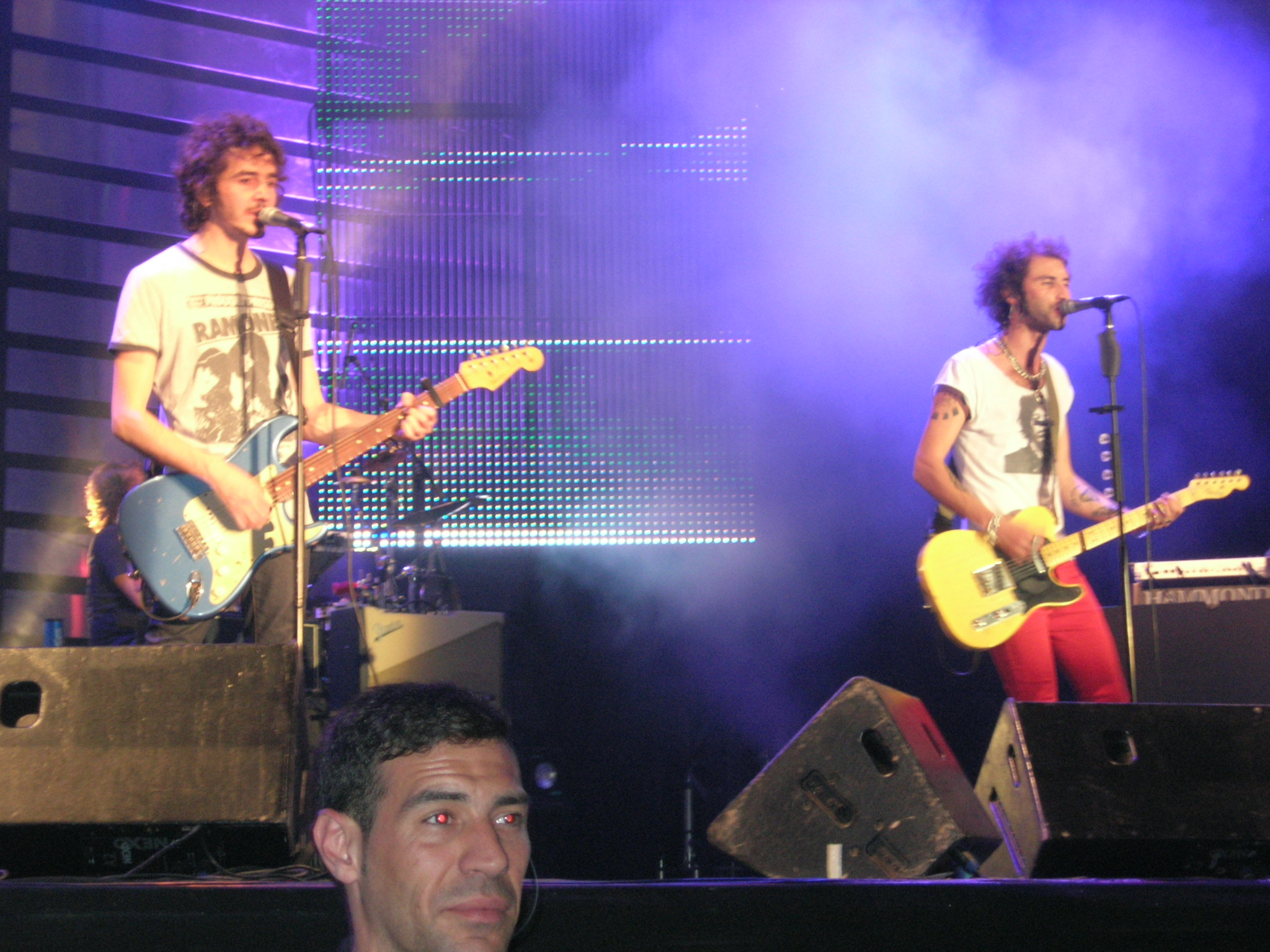

Background information
- Origin: Madrid, Spain
- Genres: Alternative rock, rock and roll, pop rock, country rock
- Years active: 2001-2012
- Label: Sony BMG
- Members: Leiva; Rubén Pozo Prats
- Past members: Tuli
- Website: www.pereza.info

Pereza (Spanish for “laziness”) was a Spanish rock group from Alameda de Osuna (Madrid) comprising Rubén Pozo Prats and José Miguel Conejo Torres, artistically known as Rubén and Leiva. They have recorded six albums Pereza, Algo para cantar (Something to Sing), Animales (Animals), Los amigos de los animales (The Animals’ Friends), Aproximaciones (Approximations) released in the summer of 2007, Aviones (Aeroplanes), released in August 2009, and a last compilation that includes two previously unreleased discs: “Mama Quiero Ser una Estrella del Rock'n’Roll” (Mama I Want to be a Rock’n’Roll Star) and “Baires”, recorded and mixed in Argentina. The group has also released two DVDs. The first was called Algo para encantar (Something to Enchant) and it contains videos from their previous album Algo para cantar and some live tracks. The second DVD is called Barcelona, which is a recording of a live concert in that city along with a CD called Rarezas (Rarities), which contains previously unreleased tracks from the band's early days.

== History ==
=== Beginnings - Pereza (2001) ===
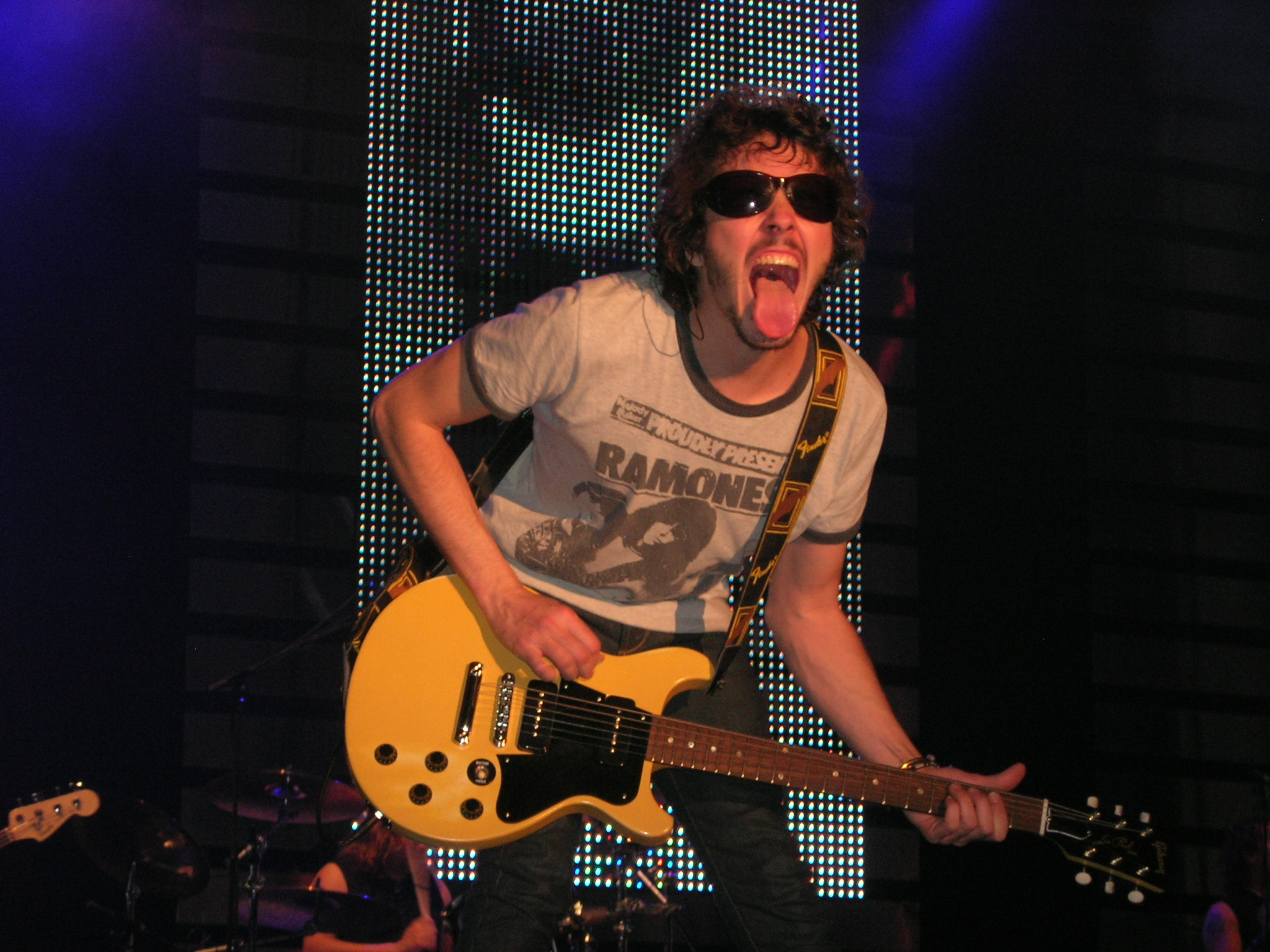
Rubén (guitarist & singer), Pereza.

The band formed in 1998 with the sole intention of playing cover versions of songs recorded by 1980s Madrid band Leño (Log). Rubén (guitars and vocals) had previously played with Madrid band Buenas Noches Rose (Good Night Rose) and Leiva (bass and vocals) had formed his own group called Malahierba (Weed). The drummer Ignacio ‘Tuli’ Villamor completed the trio. During their first gigs in small Madrid venues they became the backing band for the music critic and former Desperados singer Fernando Martín, brother of respected guitarist Guille Martín. During the time that they were playing on the nightclub circuit in Madrid they started to develop their own songs, which were heavily influenced by music from the 1970s such as Marc Bolan and the Rolling Stones as well as native Spanish bands such as Burning and Tequila. The group assimilated all these influences into a style that was clearly pop, but which made full use of guitar riffs.

A talent scout for RCA Records saw the band live and recognized the commercial potential of their image although at that time they were still a little rough around the edges. The band signed for the multinational and released their first album, which was called "Pereza" in 2001. The band's youth and inexperience are evident on the album but it was sufficiently well received to lead to a tour and in addition it improved the band's self belief. The band supported a number of established groups such as Porretas (Dope Heads), Los Enemigos (The Enemies) and Siniestro Total (Total Write-off). They also made valuable contributions to a number of compilation albums. They recorded their own reworking of the theme tune for the 1980s children's television programme "La Bruja Avería" (The Dangerous Witch) on the album "Patitos Feos” (Ugly Ducklings) (2002) which raised money for FAPMI (Federación de Asociaciones para la Prevención del Maltrato Infantil) (Federation of Associations for the Prevention of Child Abuse). On Calaveras y Diablitos presenta Rock en Ñ (Skulls and Little Devils present Rock in Spain), released in 2004, they contributed the previously unreleased "En donde estés" (Wherever Your Are). On the Hombres G tribute album released in 2003 they contributed "Voy a pasármelo bien" (I'm Going to Have A Good Time”, which ended up being used as the title of the album.

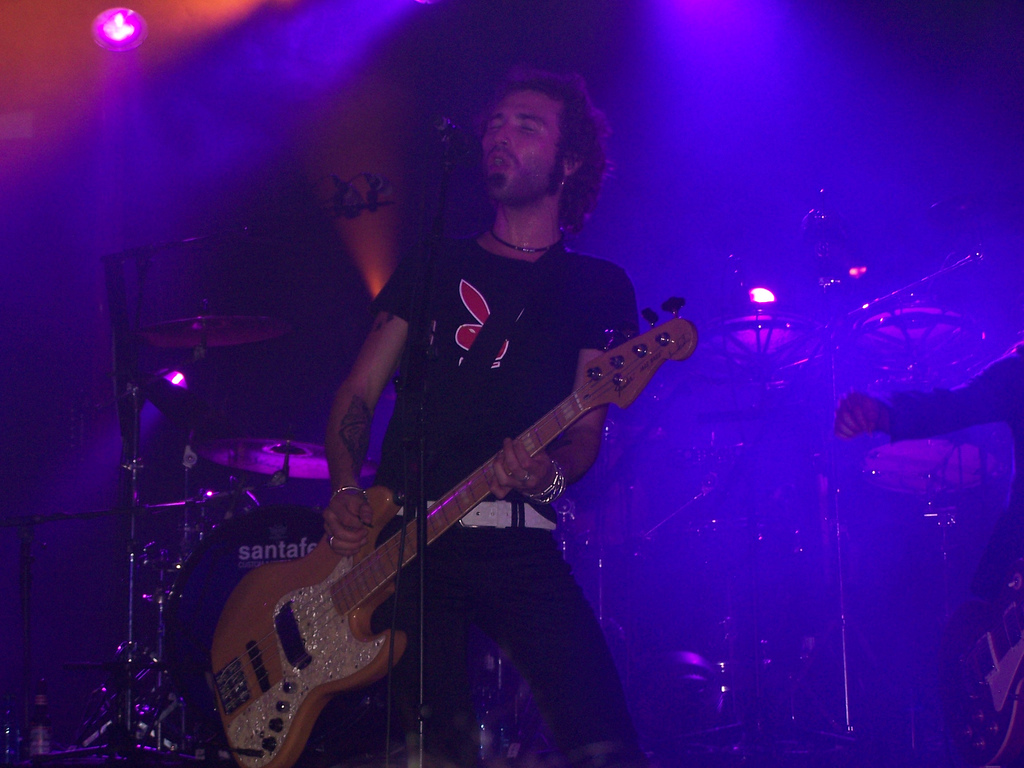
Leiva during a concert.

=== Algo para cantar (2003) ===
For their second album, Algo para cantar (2003) (Something to Sing), the band slimmed down to just the two founding members. While for live performances the line up was augmented with Rober Aracil on drums and Alfredo 'Pitu’ Gil on guitar. This enabled the group to consolidate their repertoire and live performance. The group have stated on their webpage that they consider this album bolstered their aspirations and left them in an excellent position to follow their chosen path. They consider that the songs had matured and that they maintain a fine balance between irreverent swagger, melody and eternal longing that appeals everyone. The group has estimated that they carried out two hundred concerts to promote this album. They supported Bon Jovi on their tour and they became friends with other groups such as Deluxe, Sidonie, Amaral and Los Piratas. The press started to consider the group to be "the new Tequila" or "the new Ronaldos". They recorded the video for "Pienso en Aquella Tarde" (I'm thinking of that afternoon) in collaboration with David Summers Rodríguez and Dani Martín, vocalists with Hombres G and El Canto del Loco respectively.

=== Animales (2005) ===
The band consider that they made a qualitative leap with “Animales” (2005) (Animals), which was produced by Nigel Walker (who had previously worked with Bob Dylan, Tom Petty and Aerosmith) and they also consider that the album achieved their aims and made them the rising stars of cool rock singing in the Spanish language. The album has an electric rock sound but still retains a pop feel. The single "Princesas" (Princesses), which followed the equally successful “Todo” (Everything) received a lot of airplay on commercial radio stations.

At the end of 2005 Rubén and Leiva participated in Laboratorio Ñ, a project organized by Iván Ferreiro (ex member of Los Piratas), Quique González and Xoel López (Deluxe) and supported by the SGAE. The project involved a collaboration between Spanish and Argentinian groups and musicians. In 2006 the group was nominated for awards in both the SGAE Music Awards and in the 40 Principales Music Awards in the categories of best pop-rock group, best song and pop album. In addition they were nominated in the best Spanish artist category in the MTV Europe Awards.

=== Amigos de los animales (2006) ===
The group's next album started life as a simple diversion amongst friends. Los amigos de los animales (The Friends of Animals) (2006) contains versions of songs from the first three albums as recorded by friends of the group. The collaborators include colleagues from the same musical scene such as Amaral, Pastora, Deluxe, Sidonie, Iván Ferreiro and Quique González. In addition, a number of the bands admirers were involved in the recording such as Enrique Bunbury, Carlos Tarque, Burning, Christina Rosenvinge, Coque Malla, Kevin Johansen and Ariel Rot. A flamenco flavour was added to the album by artists such as Los Delinqüentes, Alba Molina and Niño Josele.

The band consider that the album placed them at the top of the glitterati of the current Spanish pop world. The album was widely acclaimed and the band won the best pop album award at the 2007 SGAE Music Awards. In addition, by this time the "Animales" had sold nearly 80,000 copies. Before they became involved in the creation of a new album Rubén and Leiva collaborated on different projects with a number of other artists. On Ariel Rot's album "Dúos, tríos y otras perversiones" (Duos, Trios and Other Perversions) they collaborated on the track "Canal 69"(Channel 69). In June 2006 they sang "Mueve tus caderas" (Move Your Hips) at the Teatro Joy Eslava in Madrid with Burning who were touring to promote their album "Dulces dieciséis" (Sweet Sixteen). The band also collaborated with Jaime Urrutia on the song "Cuatro rosas" (Four Roses) for a live album entitled "En Joy", which was also recorded at the Teatro Joy Eslava. As part of the 40th anniversary celebrations for the radio station Los 40 Principales the group performed "Rock'n'Roll star" along with Loquillo. The group were also involved in a number of jam sessions with Xoel López and Quique González.

=== Barcelona (DVD + CD "Rarezas") (2006) ===
As the culmination of a 200-date tour the band gave a number of "unplugged" performances. Material recorded at a concert in the Teatro Tívoli in Barcelona was released on a DVD called "Barcelona" (2006). The release also included a CD with rarities, including previously unreleased material, demo material and even a version of the Barricada’s song "No sé qué hacer contigo" (I don't know what to do with you).

On the inside of the sleeve there is a history of the band, including a Sony BMG record label, telling a colleague to sign a pre-contract agreement for the recording of the first album.

=== Aproximaciones (2007) ===
“Aproximación” was released. The band consider that this single has more of a Beatles sound than a Stones sound because of its silky tones. The album sees the bands continuing growth as composers and as a rock band. Rubén and Leiva played nearly all the instruments on the album, with the notable exception of a collaboration with the ex-Rolling Stones guitarist Mick Taylor. From now on Rubén and Leiva would sing and play the guitars, and the rest of the band included Rober Aracil (drums), Luismi 'Huracán’ Ambulante (percussion), Ángel Samos (keyboards) and Manuel Mejías (bass). The singles taken from this album included “Aproximación”, “Estrella Polar” (Polar Star), “Tristeza” (Sadness), “Por mi tripa” (Through my Belly) and “Margot”.

The video for the latter was very controversial as it showed a woman masturbating on a bed for the whole length of the song. The video's director Cristian ‘Titán’ Pozo hit back against the critics by commenting that it is possible to see images of dead people on television but one showing masturbation had to be censured.

=== Aviones (2009) ===
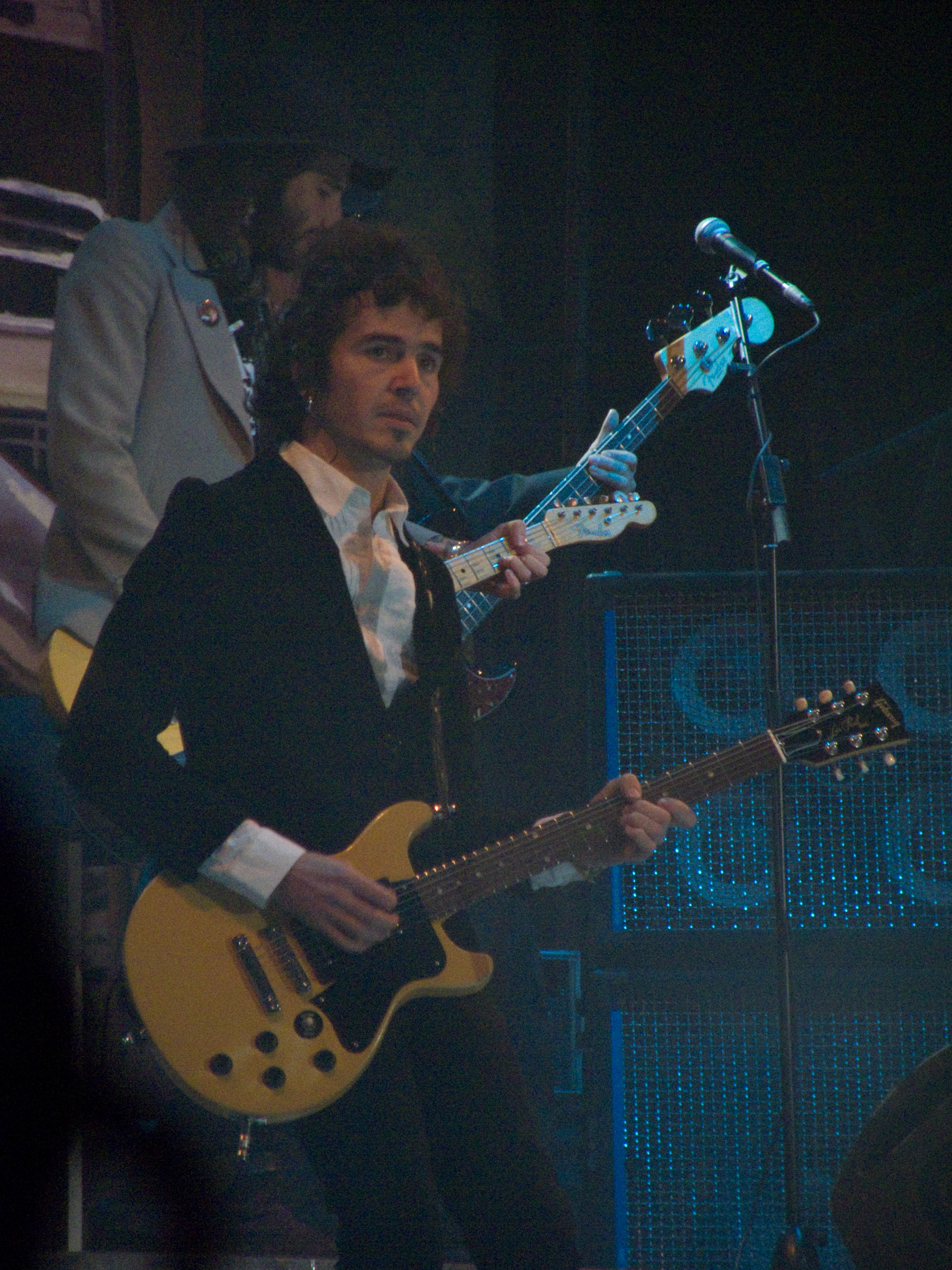
Pereza during a concert on the Vinagre y rosas tour.

Their latest album, "Aviones" (Airplanes) was released on 26 August 2009 and it went straight to number one in the Spanish charts. The first single was called "Violento amor" (Violent Love). The album is more acoustic with a gentler rhythm. It was produced by Rubén and Leiva and distributed by Sony BMG. "Lady Madrid", "Leones" (Lions) and "Escupe" (Spit). Other musicians who collaborated on the album were Andrés Calamaro on Amelie and Ariel Rot on Llévame al baile (Take me to the Dance). It is their most acoustic album to date. During 2009 Rubén and Leiva also produced, arranged and sang backing vocals on "Embustera" (Liar) and "Tiramisú de limón" (Lemon Tiramisu), which was the first single by Joaquín Sabina from the album "Vinagre y rosas" (Vinager and Roses). The second single taken from the album was “Lady Madrid” and the third was “Pirata” (Pirate) which was written and recorded by Rubén. On the launch of the latter the group's website announced that a new version of the song would be recorded which would also involve Leiva. The video was directed by Cristian ‘Titán’ Pozo.

Following the release of the album the band started the "Puro Teatro Tour" (Pure Theatre Tour) (starting in Úbeda, Jaén). During the tour they played in theatres and small auditoria in order to have a greater intimacy with the audience and to better demonstrate the new songs, which were more acoustic than those from the previous albums. This was in total contrast with the Aproximaciones tour that closed with a concert in Plaza de Las Ventas, Madrid in front of 16,000 people.

=== Diez años de Pereza (2010) ===
The band recorded an album in 2010 called Diez años de Pereza (Ten Years of Pereza) which was a compilation of their previous releases. The album is only available for sale over the internet (Spotify, iTunes).

== Discography ==
- 2001: Pereza.
- 2002: Algo para cantar
  - 2003: Algo para encantar, DVD
  - 2004: Algo para cantar (special edition)
- 2005: Animales
  - 2005: Princesas, DVD
  - 2006: Los amigos de los animales, (+DVD)
  - 2006: Barcelona (DVD + CD)
- 2007: Aproximaciones
- 2009: Baires, book, CD and DVD
- 2009: Aviones. (+DVD)
- 2010: Pereza 10 aniversario

=== Singles ===
- 2001: "Horóscopo". (Rubén)
- 2001: "Pompa de jabón". (Rubén)
- 2002: "Pienso en aquella tarde". (Leiva)
- 2003: "En donde estés". (Leiva)
- 2003: "Si quieres bailamos". (Leiva)
- 2004: "Pienso en aquella tarde", with David Summers & Dani Martín.
- 2005: "Princesas".(Leiva)
- 2005: "Lo que tengo yo adentro". (Leiva)
- 2006: "Todo". (Leiva)
- 2006: "Como lo tienes tú". (Leiva)
- 2007: "Aproximación". (Leiva)
- 2007: "Estrella polar". (Leiva)
- 2008: "Tristeza". (Leiva)
- 2008: "Por mi tripa". (Leiva)
- 2009: "Margot". (Rubén)
- 2009: "Violento amor". (Leiva)
- 2009:"Lady madrid". (Leiva)
- 2010: "Pirata". (Rubén although Leiva also sings in the video)

== Collaborations and covers ==
- "Voy a pasármelo bien" (Voy a pasármelo bien) Hombres G (2002)
- "No tocarte" (Arde la calle. Un tributo a Radio Futura) Radio Futura (2004)
- "Mi enfermedad" (Calamaro querido! Cantando al salmón) Andrés Calamaro (2006)
- "Canal 69" (Dúos, tríos y otras perversiones) Ariel Rot (2007)
- "A un minuto de ti" (Tres noches en el Victoria Eugenia) Mikel Erentxun (2008)
- "La Rueda Mágica" (No sé si es Baires o Madrid) Fito Páez (2008)
- "Despertame contigo" (Todo llegará. Rebeca Jímenez.) Carlos Tarque, Pereza y Rebeca Jiménez (2009)
- "Rocanrol Bumerang" (Bienvenidos. Tributo a Miguel Ríos) Miguel Ríos (2009)
- "Tiramisú de limon" (Vinagre y rosas) Joaquín Sabina (2009)
- "Embustera" (Vinagre y rosas) Joaquín Sabina (2009)
- "Peter Pan" (Radio La Colifata presenta a El canto del loco) El Canto del Loco (2009)
- "Todos se van" (On the Rock) Andrés Calamaro (2010)
- "Los divinos" (On the Rock) Andrés Calamaro (2010)
- "Los restos del naufragio" (Hechizo. tributo a Heroes del silencio y Bunbury) (2010)
- "Oliver y Benji" con El Hombre Linterna (2011)
- "Que hace una chica como tu en un sitio como este" con Alejo Stivel (2011)
