= Lo niego todo =

Studio album by Joaquín Sabina
- Released: March 10, 2017
- Recorded: 2016
- Genre: Pop, ballad
- Length: 48:15
- Label: Sony Music
- Producer: Leiva

Joaquín Sabina chronology
| 500 noches para una crisis (2015) | Lo niego todo (2017) |

Lo niego todo ("I deny everything") is Joaquín Sabina's 17th studio album, born out of a collaboration among Sabina himself, singer-songwriter Leiva, who serves as producer of the album, and novelist Benjamin Prado.

== Track listing ==
| No. | Title | Writer(s) | Length |
|---|---|---|---|
| 1. | "Quien más, quien menos" | Joaquín Sabina; Leiva | 4:10 |
| 2. | "No tan deprisa" | Joaquín Sabina; Benjamin Prado; Antonio García de Diego; Leiva; Rubén Pozo; César Pop | 3:45 |
| 3. | "Lo niego todo" | Joaquín Sabina; Leiva | 4:43 |
| 4. | "Postdata" | Joaquín Sabina; Benjamin Prado; Ariel Rot | 3:50 |
| 5. | "Lágrimas de mármol" | Joaquín Sabina; Leiva | 3:56 |
| 6. | "Leningrado" | Joaquín Sabina; Jaime Asúa | 4:56 |
| 7. | "Canción de primavera" | Joaquín Sabina; Pablo Milanés | 3:35 |
| 8. | "Sin pena ni gloria" | Joaquín Sabina; Leiva; Benjamin Prado; Carlos Raya | 3:55 |
| 9. | "Las noches de domingo acaban mal" | Joaquín Sabina; Leiva; Benjamin Prado | 4:07 |
| 10. | "¿Qué estoy haciendo aquí?" | Joaquín Sabina; Leiva; Jaime Asúa | 5:41 |
| 11. | "Churumbelas" | Joaquín Sabina | 3:50 |
| 12. | "Por delicadeza" | Joaquín Sabina; Leiva; Benjamin Prado | 3:14 |
| Total length: | | | 48:15 |

== Credited musicians ==
- Guitars: Carlos Raya, Ariel Rot
- Bass: Iván González 'Chapo'
- Drums: Jose 'El Niño' Bruno
- Keyboards: César Pop, Joserra Senperena

== Charts ==
=== Weekly charts ===
Weekly chart performance for Lo niego todo
| Chart (2017) | Peak position |
|---|---|
| Spanish Albums (PROMUSICAE) | 1 |

=== Year-end charts ===
Year-end chart performance for Lo niego todo
| Chart (2017) | Position |
|---|---|
| Spanish Albums (PROMUSICAE) | 2 |
| Chart (2018) | Position |
| Spanish Albums (PROMUSICAE) | 22 |
| Chart (2019) | Position |
| Spanish Albums (PROMUSICAE) | 39 |

== Certifications ==
| Region | Certification | Certified units/sales |
|---|---|---|
| Spain (PROMUSICAE) | 3× Platinum | 120,000^{‡} |
^{‡} Sales+streaming figures based on certification alone.
