= Luis Ramiro =

Spanish singer-songwriter (born 1976)

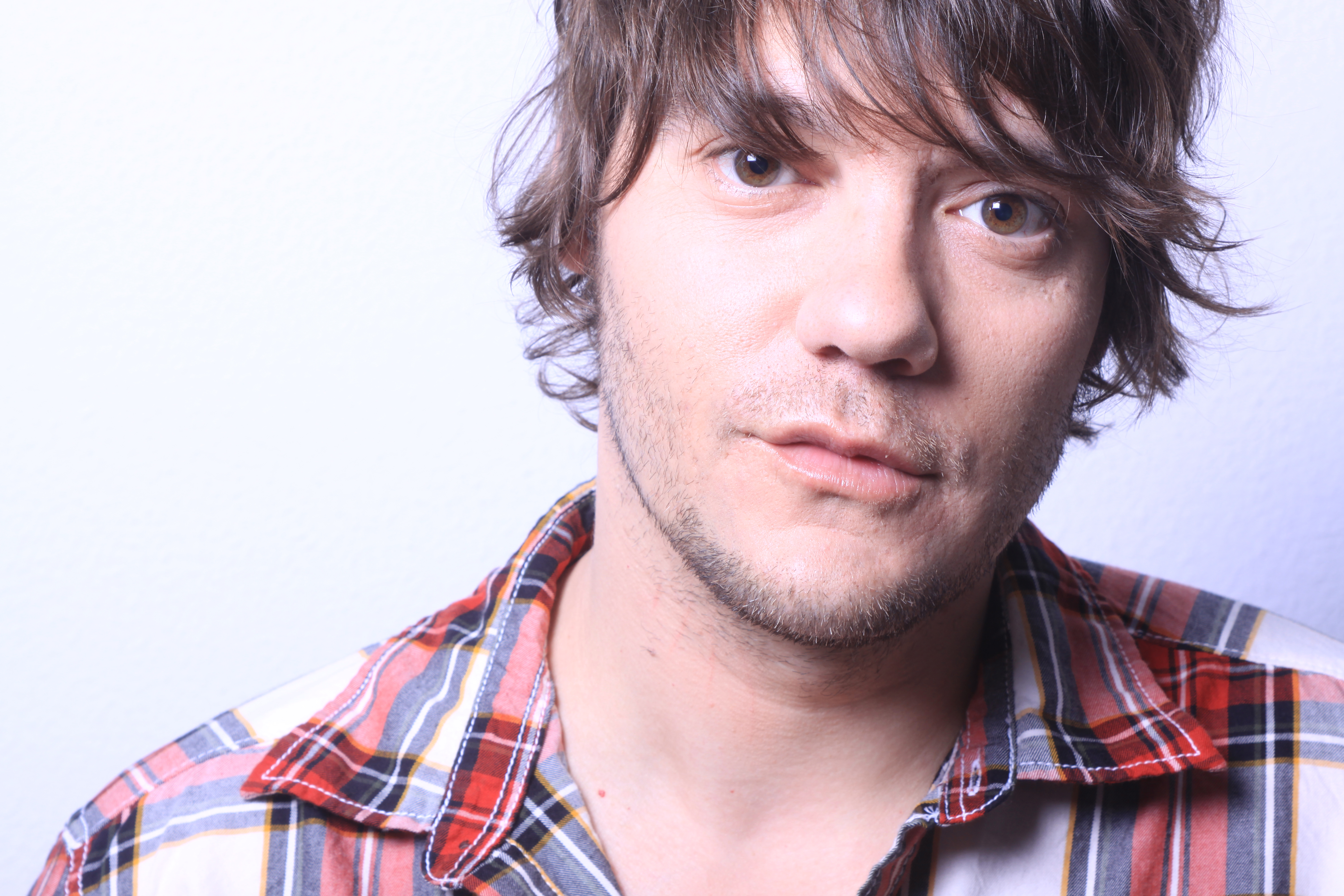
- Luis Ramiro in 2011

Background information
- Born: Luis Vicente Ramiro; 23 April 1976 (age 50)
- Origin: San Cristóbal de los Ángeles, Madrid, Spain
- Genres: Latin, rock, pop
- Occupation: singer-songwriter
- Instruments: Vocals, guitar, piano
- Years active: 2001–present
- Labels: Sony BMG, Relocos Records, Clever Music, Peer Music
- Website: www.luisramiro.com

Luis Vicente Ramiro is a Spanish singer-songwriter. He was born in Madrid (23 April 1976) at San Cristóbal de los Ángeles. In 2004 he won the Certamen Jóvenes Creadores (Young Creators Award). That award allowed his participation in representing Spain in the Biennial of Young Artists from Europe and the Mediterranean (22 September 2005, Naples). His first disc was Castigado en el Cielo (Punishment in Heaven) in 2007. The single from that album was "K.O. boy". The second disc Dramas y Caballeros (Drama and Gentlemen) was published in 2009. Dramas y Caballeros was a nominee for the Latin Grammy Awards of 2009: Best Recording Package. In 2010 he was nominee for the Premios Guilles (Guilles Awards) also named Premios la Noche en Vivo (Nightlife Awards) as best songwriter. He released his third album El Mundo por Delante (All the World is Waiting for You) on 8 March 2011. In 2011 he received for second year a nomination for the Premios Guilles as best songwriter. In 2012 he won the Premios Guilles as best songwriter. Luis Ramiro has shared the stage with Marwan, Carlos Chaouen and Conchita.

== Biography ==
=== Early years ===
Luis is the first son of Aurora Ramiro and Francisco Vicente; they named their second son Jorge. In his early years, Luis was influenced by his father, because he used to listen to classical songwriters (Joan Manuel Serrat, Joaquín Sabina, Luis Eduardo Aute, and Patxi Andión), Luis was fan of Mecano during his childhood, and when he was 12 years old, he discovered that his father's disc collection includes The Beatles "Red Album", that Album left him deeply inspired.

== Music career ==
He began his musical career at the age of 18 playing bass in different styles bands, some time later Andrés Lewin and he formed the "Playa Girón" band.

=== Influences ===
As an artist, Luis Ramiro often voiced that he was inspired by a number of performers. These include: Andrés Calamaro, Joaquín Sabina, Quique González, Radiohead, Björk, Joan Manuel Serrat, Nick Cave, Los Piratas, Sigur Rós, Tom Waits, Pereza, The Killers, Enrique Bunbury, La Buena Vida, Antony and the Johnsons, Robert Smith, The Cure, The Stone Roses, Jorge Drexler, Andrés Lewin, Charly García, Albert Plá, R.E.M., La Excepción, Tote King, Beck, Los Planetas, Nosoträsh, Love of Lesbian, Marlene, Franco Battiato.

In 2010 his lyric "Mayo de 2002" was included in "marcoELE" ( an online magazine about learning Spanish)

== Discography ==
Non – studio album

- 2002: "Por no molestar”
- 2003: "Rodeado de Genios”
- 2005: "Tristefeliz”

Album

- 2007: "Castigado en el Cielo”
- 2009: "Dramas y Caballeros”
- 2011: "El Mundo por Delante”
- 2013: "El monstruo del armario"

== Philanthropy ==
I´m learning to empathize with the problems of others and I must do my bit.

— Luis Ramiro, 2011

During his career, Luis Ramiro has performed at a large number of benefit concerts (Down syndrome, cancer, Valdemoro Prison, Saharaui Town, AIDS, child maltreatment, anorexia). He was invited to perform by the Federación de Asociaciones para la Prevención del Maltrato Infantil (Federation of Associations of child maltreatment prevention, FAMPI) on 26 February 2007. Luis Ramiro was invited by the Federación Española de Instituciones para el síndrome de Down (Spanish Federation of Institutions for Down's Syndrome, FEISD) to sing in the World Down Syndrome Day Gala Performance on 21 March 2009. In June 2010, he sang to raise funds for the construction of the orphanage building in Uganda, (a NGO "Adelante África" project ). Also in this month he was invited by the "Asociación Leganés con el Pueblo Saharaui" to sing in benefit show to help raise money for Saharaui refugee camps in Tindouf (Algeria). He sang at Ciudad Real concert fund-raising for the NGO FARMAMUNDI CLM on Friday 22 October 2010. In February 2011, he visited the Niño Jesús Hospital, to perform for the Mood Disorders Unit patients. In March 2011, Luis Eduardo Aute, Ismael Serrano, Pedro Guerra, Carlos Chaouen, Marwan, Andrés Suárez and Luis Ramiro collaborated singing to raise money for Palestinian people (a NGO "Rumbo a Gaza" project).

== Awards and nominations ==
=== Certamen Jóvenes Creadores ===
Year	Lyrics	Category	Result
2004	"Dos coplas", " Mi vecina de enfrente”	Music	Won

=== Latin Grammy Awards ===
Year	Album	Category	Result
2009	"Dramas y Caballeros"	Best Recording Package	Nominated

=== Premios Guilles ===
- Luis Ramiro has won one Premio Guille and earned two nominations.

Year	Category	Result
2010	Best Songwriter of 2009	Nominated
2011	Best Songwriter of 2010	Nominated
2012	Best Songwriter of 2011	Won
