= Conchita (musician) =

Spanish singer and songwriter

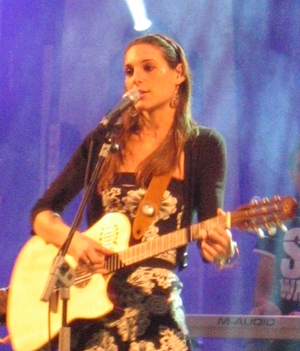

Background information
- Born: María Concepción Mendívil Feito; 3 March 1981 (age 44); Helsinki, Finland
- Origin: Madrid, Spain
- Genres: Pop; folk
- Occupation: Singer-songwriter
- Years active: 2007–present
- Labels: EMI Spain

María Concepción Mendívil Feito (born 3 March 1981), known professionally as Conchita, is a Spanish singer-songwriter.

In addition to her solo musical career, in January 2016 she announced on Facebook the release of the first music video by the group she formed with Pablo Cebrián, Chansons d'hiver, which produces songs in French, for "Deux oiseaux". Her first EP was released on 22 March 2016, in digital format.

== Biography ==
Conchita cites her musical influences as Carlos Chaouen, Jorge Drexler, Tontxu, Antonio Vega, Los Piratas, Quique González, Corinne Bailey Rae and Édith Piaf. Since she was 5 or 6 years old she made songs and recorded them on a plastic Cassette tape, and later with a toy electronic piano. She got her first guitar at the age 15 and started practicing the instrument.

In addition to playing guitar and piano, she plays drums, accompanying live bands such as Tom's Cabin and Luis Ramiro on their 2016 tour.

Conchita is involved in the production of her music and accompanying media such as music videos. In 2015, she released a single in support of Hospitalized Children's Day with the song "Un beso redondo".

== Discography ==
=== Albums ===
Year	Album	Chart	Sales / Certification
Year	Album	SPA	Sales / Certification
2007	Nada más	16	Sales Spain: 80.000 / Platinum
2009	4.000 palabras	10	Sales Spain: 1.600+
2012	Zapatos nuevos	32	
2014	Esto era	28	
2016	Incendios	70	
2021	La Orilla	7	
2023?	La Bola de Nieve	?	

=== Extended plays ===
- Tocando Madera (2010)
- Prologue (2016)

=== Singles ===
Year	Single	Album	Chart	
Year	Single	Album	SPA	LAT
2006	"No dejes de Soñar"	High School Musical OST		
2007	"Tres Segundos"	Nada Más	11	
2007	"Nada que Perder"	Nada Más	1	32
2008	"Puede Ser"	Nada Más	5	
2008	"Cuéntale"	4.000 palabras	28	
