= Elvira Sastre =

Spanish writer, poet, philologist, and literary translator

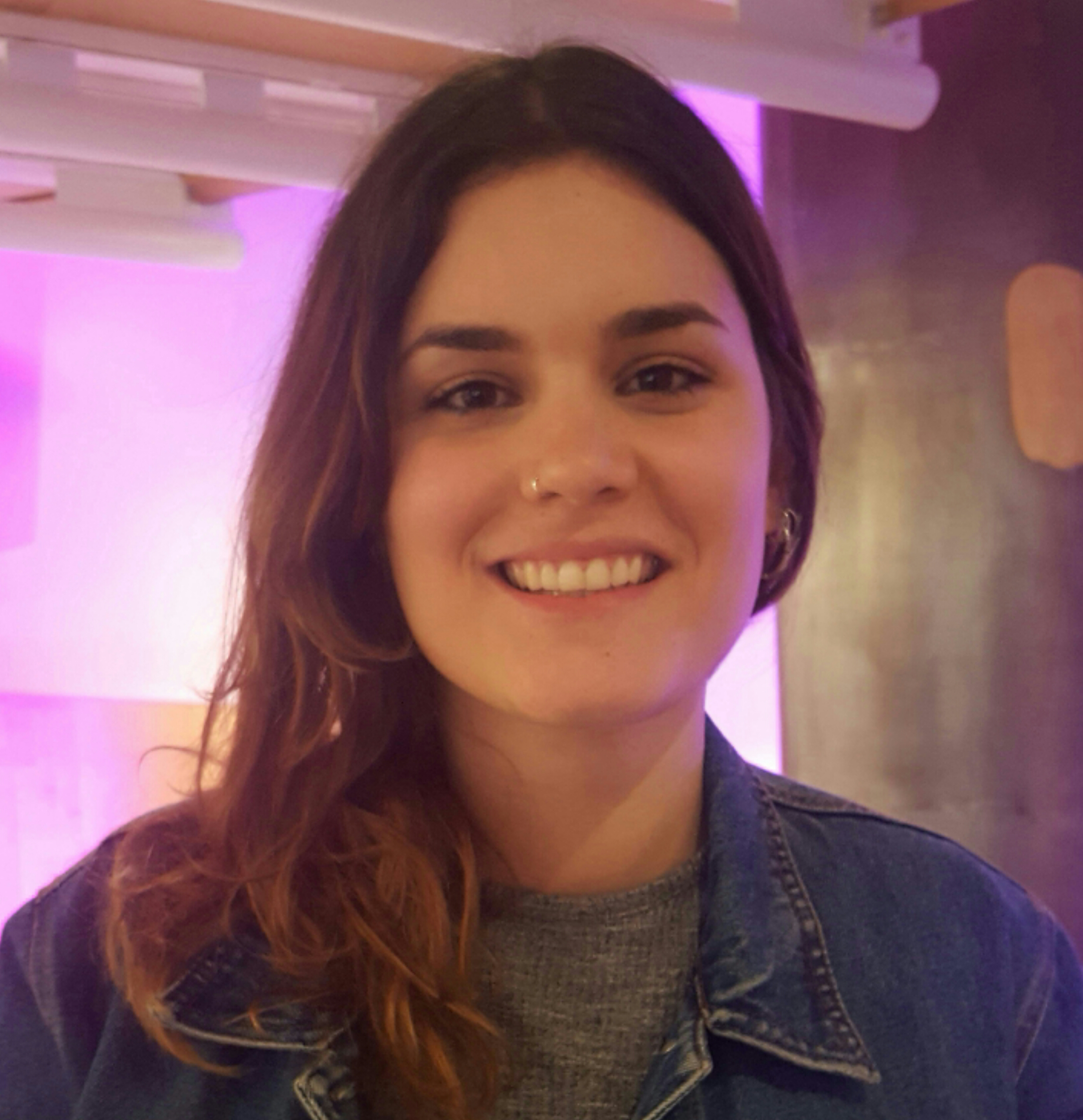
- Born: 1992 (age 33–34); Segovia, Spain
- Occupations: Writer, poet
- Years active: 2013–present

Signature
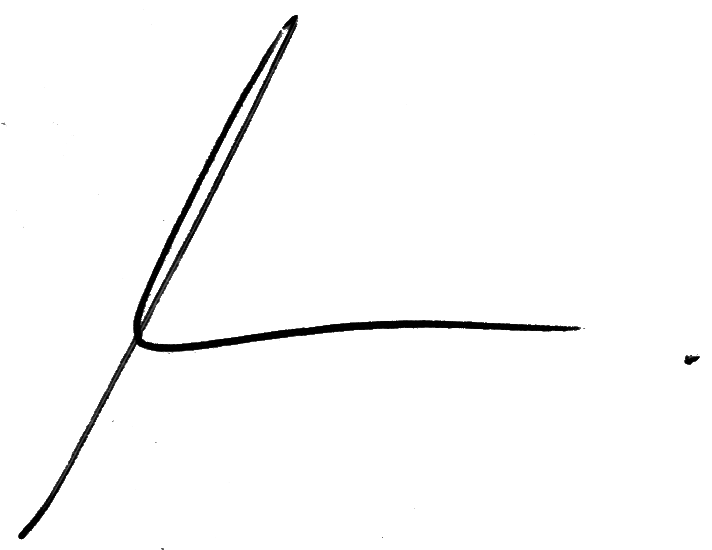

Elvira Sastre Sanz (born 1992) is a Spanish writer, poet, philologist, and literary translator.

== Biography and professional career ==
Elvira Sastre was born in 1992 in Segovia, Spain. Her father encouraged her to take an interest in literature, thanks to which Sastre later became a professional writer. She wrote her first poem at the age of 12, and later started her blog "Relocos y recuerdos", when she turned 15. The blog has been inactive since 2019. She soon won a poetry prize for her work Saudade.

A couple years later, she started her degree in English Studies in Madrid. Meanwhile, Sastre continued writing and began to participate in poetry events, together with a number of singer-songwriters and famous poets.

In 2013, Sastre began her career as a writer with the publication of her work Cuarenta y tres maneras de soltarse el pelo, edited by Lapsus Calami publishers, with preface by Benjamín Prado, who introduced Sastre into Spanish contemporary poetry. In May 2014, Valparaiso Edicones publishers, based in Spain and Latin America, proposed that she publish her second book of poems. Before that, she had participated in an artistic and literary project called "Tú la Acuarela / Yo la lírica", that combines Sastre's poems with watercolours of illustrator Adriana Moragues. In 2016, Sastre published a poem selection in the book Ya nadie baila, with preface by Fernando Valverde.

Sastre combines her writing career with her work as professional translator. Amongst her translations are Los hijos de Bob Dylan, written by North American author Gordon E. McNeer and the lyrics in English of the La deriva album, by Spanish musical group Vetusta Morla.

Sastre's poetics degree has allowed her to take part in some important festivals and literary events, mainly in Latin America, as well as to give conferences in certain American universities.

== Awards and honours ==
In 2019, Sastre won the Premio Biblioteca Breve for her first novel, Días sin ti.

== Works ==
=== Books ===
- Tú la acuarela/Yo la lírica (Coautora) (2013).
- Cuarenta y tres maneras de soltarse el pelo (Lapsus Calami, 2014).
- Baluarte (Valparaíso Ediciones, 2014).
- Ya nadie baila (Valparaíso Ediciones, 2016).
- La soledad de un cuerpo acostumbrado a la herida (Visor Libros, 2016).
- Aquella orilla nuestra (Alfaguara, 2018).
- Días sin ti (Seix Barral, 2019).

=== Translations ===
- Poemas de Amor, by Oscar Wilde.
- Milk and honey, by Rupi Kaur.
- La deriva by Vetusta Morla.
- Los hijos de Bob Dylan, by Gordon E. McNeer.
- Highly illogical behavior, by John Corey Whaley.
- Violet Bent Backwards Over the Grass, by Lana Del Rey.

=== Poems ===
Besides her poetry blog "Relocos y recuerdos", she makes photo poems and video poems.
