= Laboratorio Ñ =

Laboratorio Ñ was an initiative of the Spanish musicians Iván Ferreiro (ex member of Los Piratas), Quique González and Xoel López (Deluxe), that took part between 8th and 22 November 2005. These musicians met in the house-musical study El Cielito, 30 km from Buenos Aires, to compose music together. Some other musicians also took part: from Spain Amaral and Pereza, and from Argentina (Bersuit, which was only for the welcome, Súper Ratones and Lisandro Aristimuño), but nevertheless the initial plan the only musicians really involved were the promoters of the lab. The project was a collaboration with SGAE.
