= Fernando Valverde =

Fernando Valverde may refer to:

- Tito Valverde, Spanish actor
- Fernando Valverde (poet), Spanish-language poet and professor
