= Vinagre y rosas =

Fourteenth album by Joaquín Sabina

Studio album by Joaquín Sabina
- Released: November 17, 2009
- Genre: Rock, Pop
- Length: 57:37
- Language: Spanish
- Label: Sony BMG
- Producer: Pancho Varona, Antonio García de Diego, José Antonio Romero and Joaquín Sabina

Joaquín Sabina chronology
Dos pájaros de un tiro (2007)	Vinagre y rosas (2009)	La orquesta del Titanic (2010)

Vinagre y rosas is the fourteenth studio album by Spanish singer-songwriter Joaquín Sabina, released by Sony BMG on November 17, 2009. It includes thirteen songs, a bonus track and the first single is "Tiramisú de limón", a song in which the group Pereza participate as composers of his music and singers. The second single is "Viudita de Cliquot". It remained seventeen weeks in the highest position in the list of best-selling albums in Spain and obtained three platinum discs. Worldwide it has reached 400,000 copies sold.

Professional ratings
Review scores
Source	Rating
Allmusic	4/5 stars

== Production ==
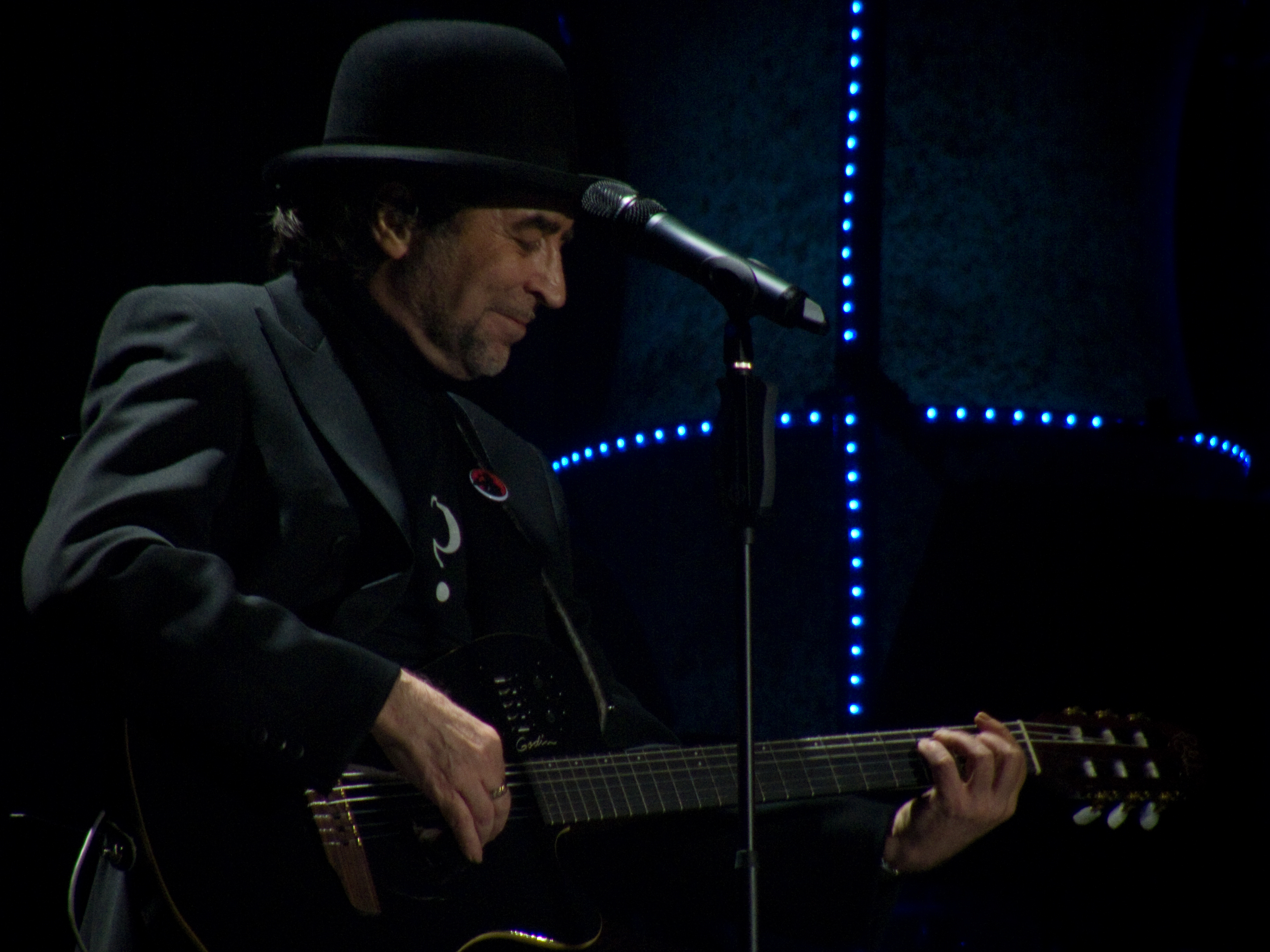
Joaquín Sabina during the promotional concert of the tour in Madrid.

The production was carried out by the singer-songwriter's usual collaborators, Pancho Varona, Antonio García de Diego, José Antonio Romero and Joaquín Sabina himself also participated; except for the songs "Tiramisú de limón", which is the first single, and "Embustera", which were produced by the group Pereza. According to Sabina's own words, the choice of the group Pereza to make this collaboration was:

Because I was getting a rather bitter album. I like bitter songs; in fact, they are the ones I like the most, but I thought it was necessary to open a couple of windows and let some fresh, youthful, rock and roll air in, and the only Spanish group I liked to make that kind of collaboration were Pereza. [...] I decided to contact a young rock group to give me that air that I had at the age of thirty.

— Joaquín Sabina

The single "Tiramisú de limón", is a mid-tempo song that starts with a porteño feel, and then changes to rock, with a compact and powerful sound, accompanied by César Pop playing the accordion and with Joan Manuel Serrat, Guti, Pancho Varona and Antonio García de Diego on backing vocals. The lyrics of the single were composed by Joaquín Sabina and the music by Pereza. Leiva wrote the scores for drums, bass, acoustic and electric guitars, tambourine and backing vocals; and Rubén Pozo composed the electric guitar part and backing vocals. This is the first time that the singer-songwriter and the band have collaborated.

The lyrics of ten of the songs were written by Joaquín Sabina together with Benjamín Prado, poet and friend of the singer-songwriter. For this, they traveled to Prague and stayed at the Kempinski Hybernská, one of the most luxurious hotels in the capital of the Czech Republic, for eight days. After this trip, they continued the composition in Madrid and Rota (Cádiz). Prado recounted the songwriting process and the trip to Prague in the book Romper una canción, published in 2009. Another song was composed with the poet and friend Luis García Montero. The song "Violetas para Violeta", which is a bonus track, is dedicated to the Chilean singer-songwriter Violeta Parra. Sabina had composed this song for several years, but it had never been released. Mercedes Sosa, two months before her death on October 4, 2009, asked the singer-songwriter to sing a song with him. After the death of the Argentine singer-songwriter, Sabina decided to include the original version in the album as a tribute to both singer-songwriters. The song "Menos dos alas" is dedicated to the poet Ángel González, a friend of the singer-songwriter who died in 2008.

The album was released simultaneously in two different formats: a book-CD edition, which includes drawings and texts by Joaquín Sabina, and a standard CD edition. The music video of the single was made by Rafa Sañudo, was recorded in the old Mercado de Frutas y Verduras de Legazpi, in Madrid, and counted with the collaboration of Pereza and Mónica Molina.

== Tour ==
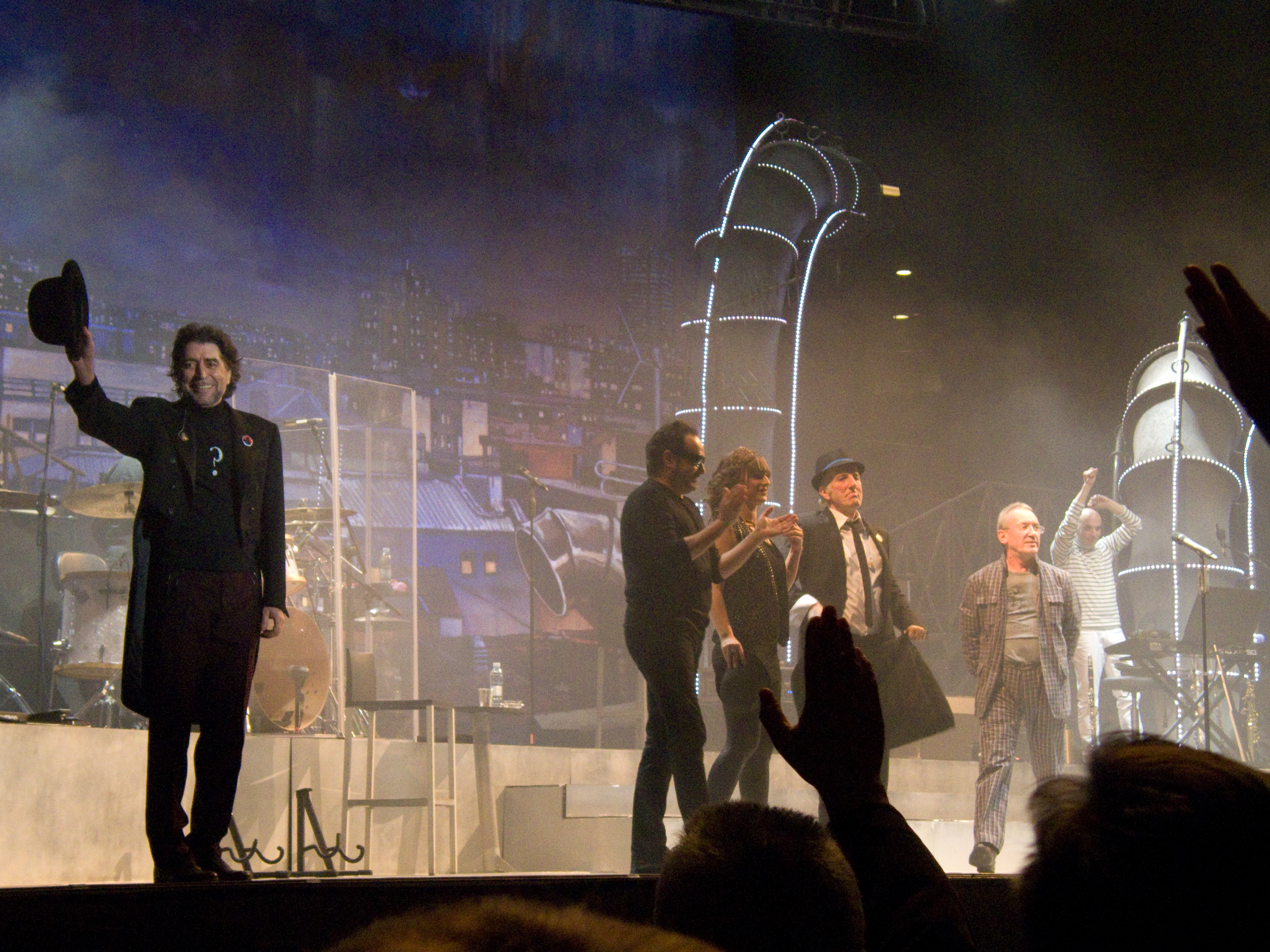
At the end of the concert in Madrid. From left to right: Joaquín Sabina, Jaime Asúa, Mara Barros, Pancho Varona, Antonio García de Diego and José Miguel Pérez Sastre.

Shortly after the release of Vinagre y rosas on November 17, Joaquín Sabina began a tour to present the album. The first concert of the tour was at the Multiusos Sánchez Paraíso in Salamanca and took place on November 20 and 21. The musicians on the tour were Pancho Varona, Antonio García de Diego, Pedro Barceló, Jaime Asúa, José Miguel Pérez Sastre and Mara Barros.

The tour then went to Vigo, Zaragoza, Valencia, Pamplona, San Sebastian, Bilbao, Roquetas de Mar, Cordoba, Madrid, Barcelona, Granada and Malaga, among other Spanish cities. Starting on January 15, 2010, the Latin American tour began in Argentina in the city of Trelew, to travel later to the Argentine cities of Junín and Buenos Aires (the concert took place at the Alberto J. Armando Stadium), later to the Chilean cities of Olmué and Santiago de Chile, then to the Argentine city of Mar del Plata, after which he performed in the capital of Uruguay, Montevideo, at the Estadio Centenario; and concluded the tour in the Argentine cities of Córdoba, at the Estadio Mario Alberto Kempes; Santa Fe, Neuquén, Mendoza (Argentina), at the Estadio Islas Malvinas; and Rosario. This tour, according to the singer-songwriter himself, would be the last one he would make on big stages.

The tour in Spain was very well attended and the tickets were sold out a few days after they went on sale. Initially he was going to perform a single concert in Salamanca, but, given that the tickets for the concert on the 20th were sold out in five days, he scheduled a second performance for the following day. In Vigo 3000 people attended the only concert held in Galicia, in Zaragoza tickets were sold out the same day they went on sale for the two concerts he performed in the city, in Cordoba 5500 of the capacity of the venue where he was going to perform the concert were sold out, in Madrid the 10 000 tickets of the Palacio de los Deportes were sold out in 4 days and in Barcelona the date for a new concert was confirmed after selling all the tickets for the first concert scheduled at the Palau Sant Jordi.

== Reception ==
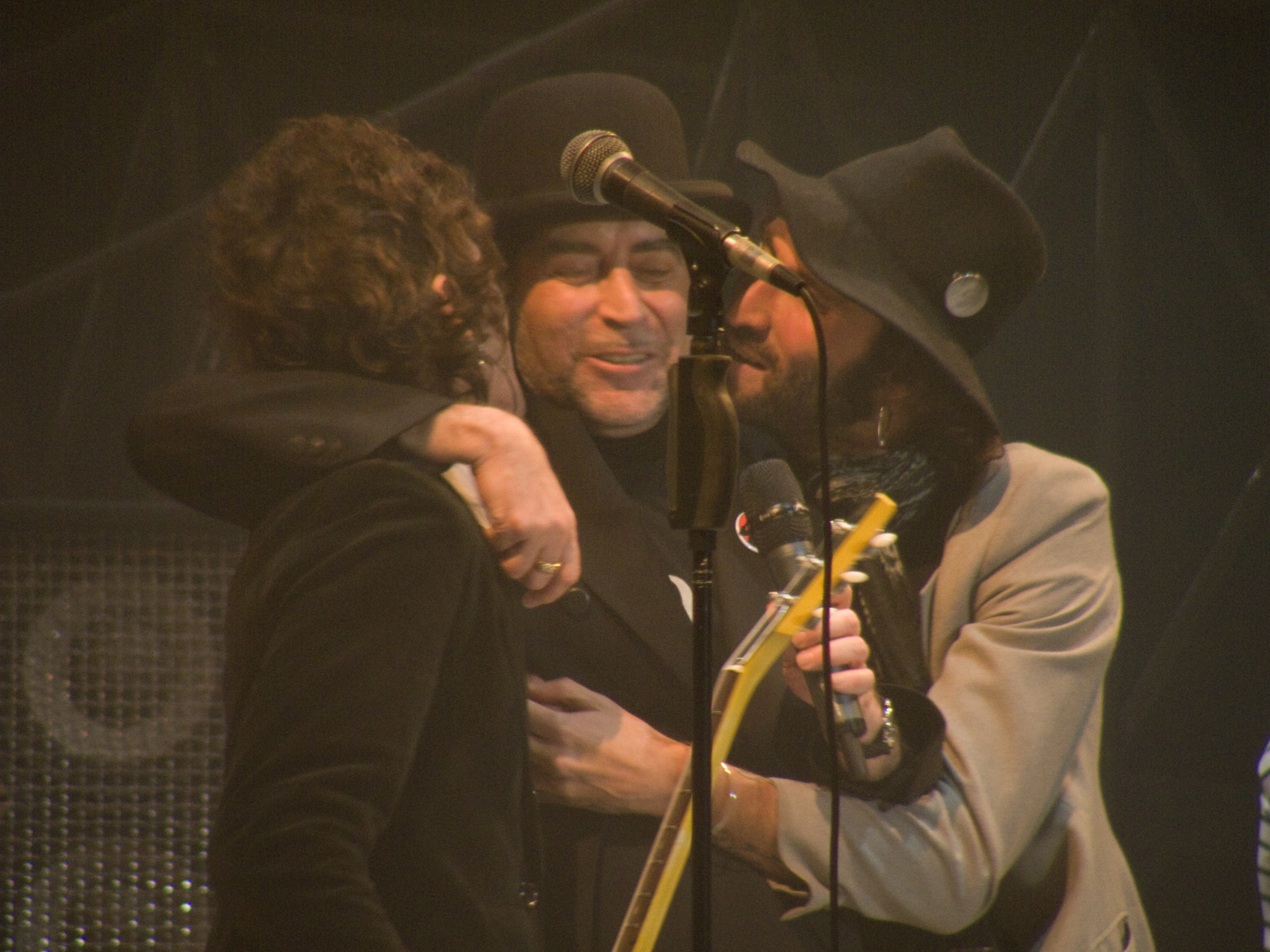
Joaquín Sabina with Pereza, who performed as guest artists, during the Madrid concert of the Vinagre y rosas tour.

In the week of its release in the Spanish market, Vinagre y rosas was number one in sales, becoming the strongest entry of the last seven days, maintained that number one position the following week and achieved a triple platinum record (more than 180,000 copies sold). In addition, it also debuted at number one on the best-selling albums chart in Argentina, where it also went platinum, and on the iTunes digital chart in Mexico. It remained 17 weeks at the top of Spain's best-selling albums chart.

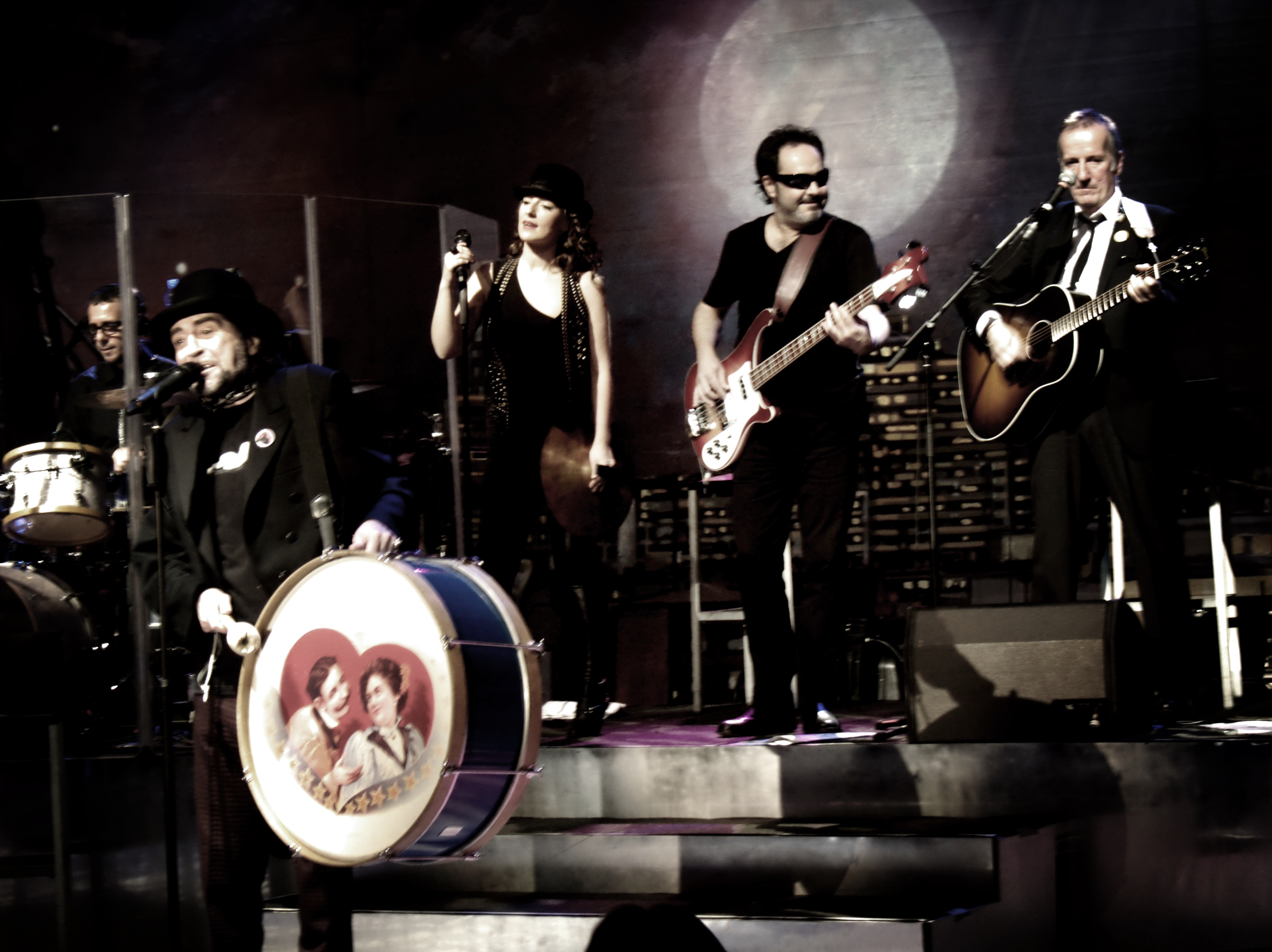
Joaquín Sabina during a concert tour in Granada (Spain). At the back and from left to right: Pedro Barceló, Mara Barros, Jaime Asúa and Pancho Varona.

In general, the album has received rave reviews. For example, G. Cappa considers the album to be "a fertilized territory for the flowers of evil, for the songs that pinch the soul" and Luis García Montero, a friend of the singer-songwriter, affirms that Sabina is "more Joaquín than ever".

On the contrary, other critics believe that the album is not at the same level of the singer-songwriter's previous works and focus their criticism on the production work of the album, carried out by Sabina's regular collaborators such as Pancho Varona, Antonio García de Diego or José Antonio Romero, and on the instrumentation of some of the songs. Juan Puchades affirms that "it is not a bad album, it is simply weak" and regarding the production work "when the producers [...] have decided to put some voltage they have done it with quite conventional, ugly and even tacky guitars, those that fall into the worst rockism" although he highlights as the best songs "Menos dos alas" (dedicated to the poet Ángel González), "Cristales de Bohemia", "Agua pasada" or "Parte meteorológico" and affirms that "Sabina in Vinagre y rosas sings as he wants". For his part, Diego A. Manrique affirms that "Vinagre y rosas has the makings of a good album by Joaquín. The mirage works if you refuse to recognize that you have enjoyed it all before, and in superior versions, in other albums of his" and believes that the lyrics of the songs have lost their quality when they have been fitted with the music.

As a result of this album, Benjamín Prado, co-author of the lyrics, published a book entitled Romper una canción, in which he narrated the process of creating the lyrics of the songs, which he defined as "four-handed".

== Track list ==
No.	Title	Length
1.	"Tiramisú de limón" (With Pereza)	4:13
2.	"Viudita de Clicquot"	4:13
3.	"Cristales de Bohemia"	4:27
4.	"Parte meteorológico"	3:50
5.	"Ay! Carmela"	3:25
6.	"Virgen de la amargura"	3:30
7.	"Agua pasada"	3:40
8.	"Vinagre y rosas"	5:04
9.	"Embustera" (With Pereza)	4:10
10.	"Nombres impropios"	4:24
11.	"Menos dos alas"	3:34
12.	"Crisis"	3:47
13.	"Blues del alambique"	4:42
14.	"Violetas para Violeta" (Bonus track)	4:57

== Position in lists ==
Country	List	Position
Argentina	CAPIF	1
Spain	Promusicae	1
Mexico	AMPROFON	3
