= Julián Infante =

Spanish guitarist (1957–2000)

Julián Infante Martín-Nieto
- Born: 17 July 1957
- Died: 4 December 2000 (aged 43)
- Occupation: Musician
- Instrument: Guitar
- Formerly of: Tequila; Los Rodríguez

Julián Infante Martín-Nieto (17 July 1957 – 4 December 2000) was a Spanish guitarist, best known for his stints with the Argentine–Spanish rock bands Tequila (1976–1982) and Los Rodríguez (1991–1997).

== Discography ==
=== with Tequila ===
- Matrícula de Honor (1978)
- Rock and roll (1979)
- Viva! Tequila! (1980)
- Confidencial (1981)

=== with Los Rodríguez ===
- Buena suerte (1991)
- Disco Pirata (1992)
- Sin documentos (1993)
- Palabras más, palabras menos (1995)
- Hasta luego (1997)
