= Rubén Pozo =

Spanish singer and songwriter (born 1975)

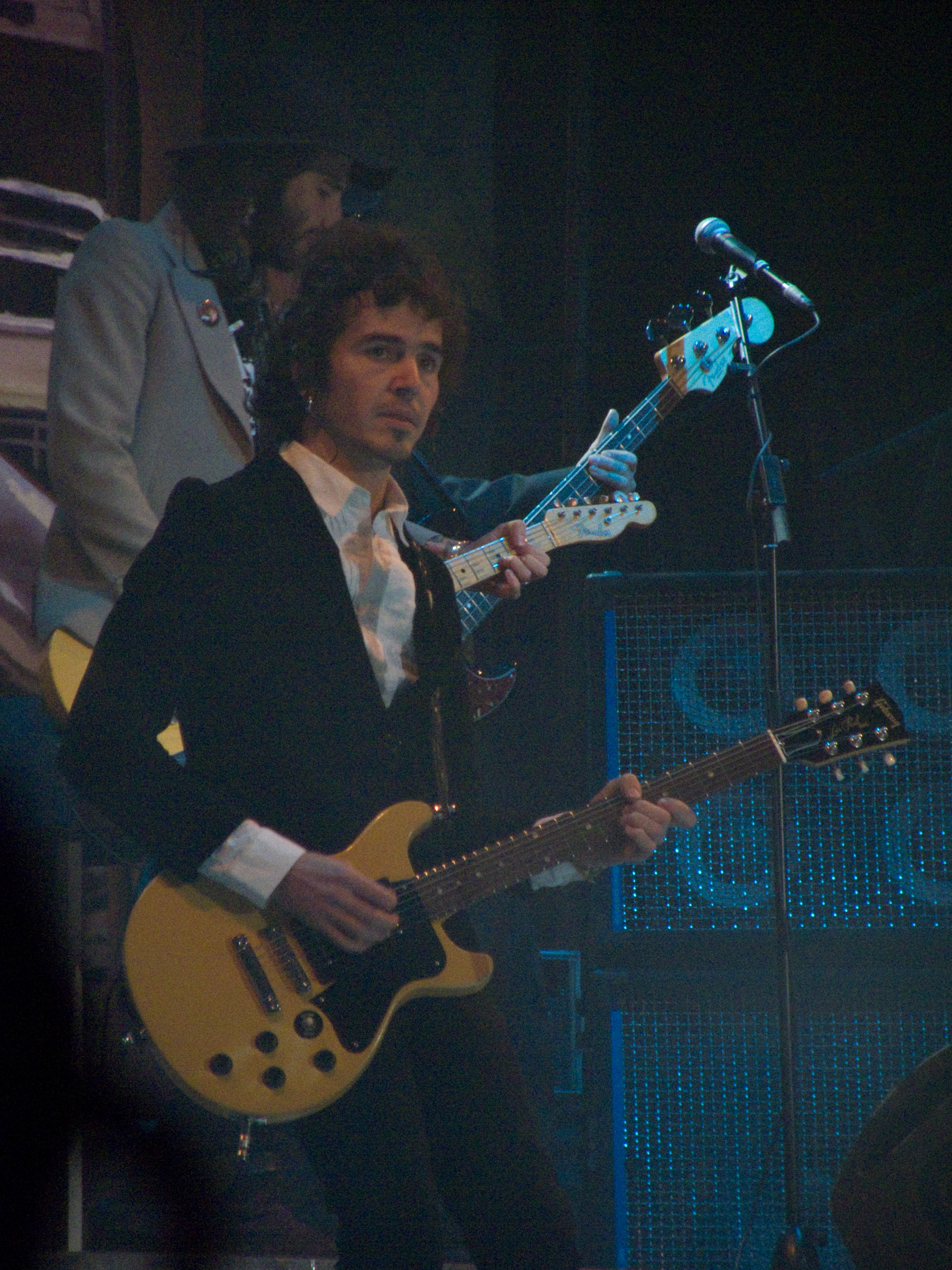

Background information
- Born: Rubén Pozo Prats; 21 July 1975 (age 50); Barcelona, Spain
- Origin: Spanish
- Genres: Rock
- Occupations: Vocalist; guitarist; songwriter
- Instrument: Guitar
- Years active: 1995–present
- Website: Official website

Rubén Pozo Prats (born 21 July 1975) is a Spanish musician singer and songwriter. In the second half of the 90s he formed a band called "Buenas Noches Rose", which he recorded three CD's. After the breaking up of the band he created the group "Pereza" with Leiva (Jose Miguel Conejo).

== Biography ==
Ruben Pozo was born in Barcelona and grew up in the neighbourhood of Alameda de Osuna, Madrid. He started playing the guitar when he was a teenager interpreting the groups he liked, such as "Extremoduro, Barricada, Kiko Veneno, Pepe Risi, Santiago Auseron or Sabino Méndez". He also was influenced by the English Rock With groups like The Rolling Stones, The Beatles, Marc Bolan and The New York Dolls.

He had not finished high school yet when he formed the band Buenas Noches Rose, being the guitarist and the songwriter of the group. Apart from their own songs, the group also made their own version of songs from Leño and Led Zeppelin. The group recorded three Cds: "Buenas noches Rose (1992), La danza de araña(1997) and La estación seca(1999)”.

After the group broke up, he started a new group with José Miguel Conejo Torres (also known as Leiva) and the drummer Tuli calledPereza. In their first album, Pereza(2001), Ruben was the main singer, but in the next ones Leiva took the role instead of Rubén. In just a few years Pereza started to be really popular and it reached a lot of success. With collaborations from other artists such as Alejo Estivel, Miguel Rios, Andrés Calamaro or Ariel Rot, Ruben has also collaborated with Joaquín Sabina, for who he wrote the song "Embustera" which was included in the CD "Vinagre y rosas" and "Poncho K" ("el ultimo sol") and "Ivan Ferreiro"(SPNB). In this times he also was the producer of the discs "Pequeño Salvaje"(group owned by the actor Fede Celada and the ex-singer of Buenas Noches Rose, Jordi Skywalker).

After the separation of Pereza (although Leiva and Ruben still have a good relationship) and a period of charm, by the end of 2011 he starts working on a new band, with the aim of composing his first solo album, which was released in the spring of 2012 with the name "Lo que más". In the months of October and November 2012, he started a tour with the guitar in certain cities. He called it "Menos es Más", to name it in relation with the name of the CD "Lo que más" and to make reference to the fact that he would be acting alone without a band and just with his guitar as a "Llanero Solitario".

== Discography ==
=== Buenas Noches Rose ===
- Buenas Noches Rose ("Good Night Rose")(1995)
- La Danza de la Araña ("The spider's Dance")(1997)
- La Estación Seca ("The dry season") (1999)

=== Pereza ===
In 1998 Ruben and José Miguel Conejo Torres got together with the intention of making new versions of Leño's songs. They were singing in a normal bar when a man saw them and he immediately got interested on them. Few months later they signed their first contract with a multinational and recorded their first album.

- 2001: Pereza. ("Laziness")
- 2002: Algo para cantar. ("Something to sing")

- 2003: Algo para encantar, DVD.
- 2004: Algo para cantar (edición especial).

- 2005: Animales. ("Animals")

- 2005: Princesas, DVD.
- 2006: Los amigos de los animales, (+DVD).
- 2006: Barcelona (DVD + CD).

- 2007: Aproximaciones. ("Approximations")
- 2009: Baires, libro CD y DVD.
- 2009: Aviones. (+DVD) ("Planes")
