= Iván Ferreiro =

Spanish singer-songwriter

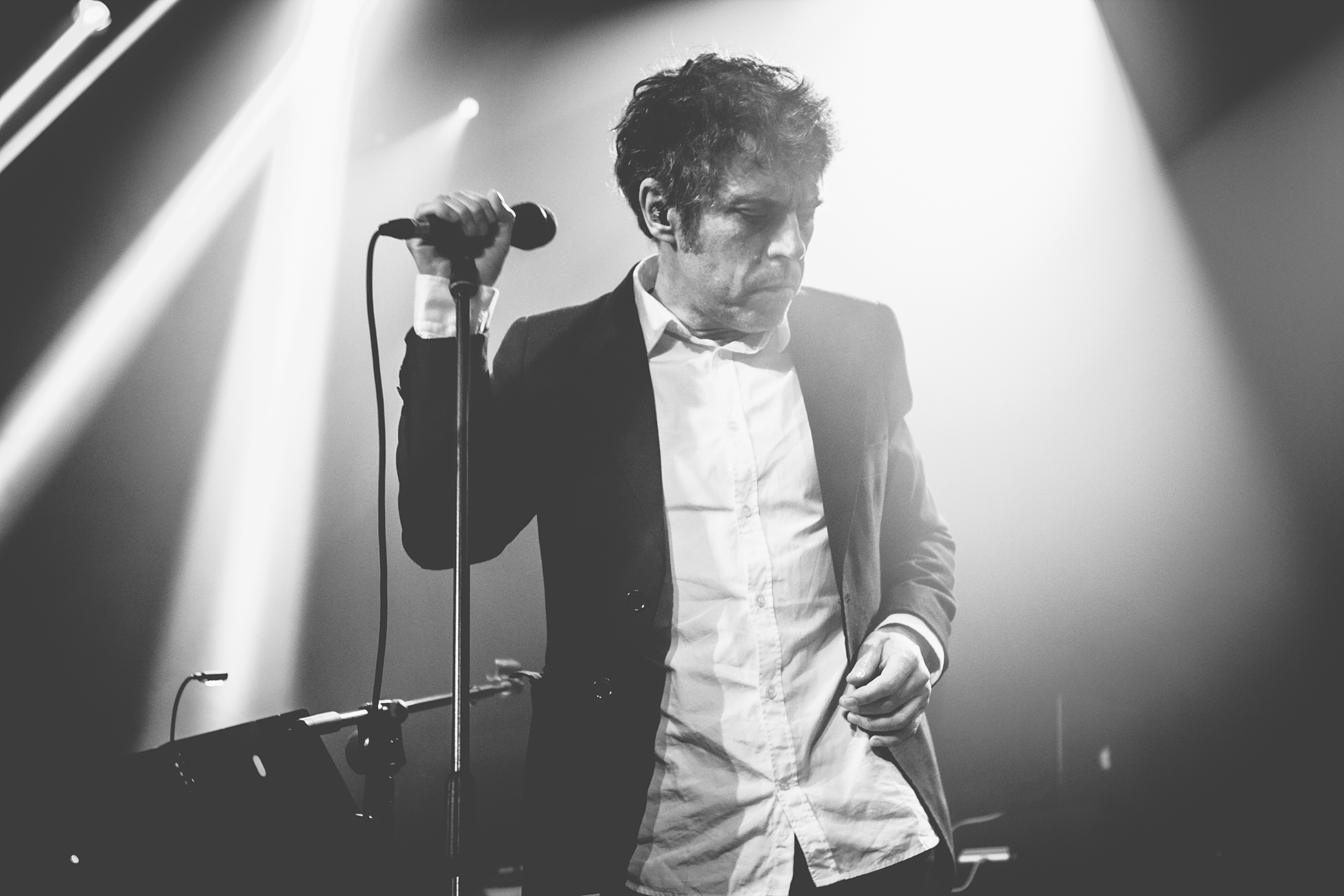
- Ferreiro in 2017.

Background information
- Born: Iván Ferreiro Rodríguez; 14 August 1970 (age 55); Nigrán, Galicia, Spain
- Genres: Indie rock; indie pop
- Occupations: Singer; songwriter
- Years active: 1990–present

Iván Ferreiro Rodríguez (born 14 August 1970) is a Spanish singer-songwriter born in Vigo, Galicia. He was the voice, leader and composer of the popular pop-rock band Los Piratas.

== Career ==
After Los Piratas split, by late 2003, Iván kept playing with his brother Amaro in a pub in Vigo, called El Ensanche. Due to the success of this set of concerts, he decided to record an album with new songs, Canciones para el tiempo y la distancia, that was released in 2005. In the tour of the album, Tournedo, Iván was accompanied by his brother on the guitar and Karlos Arancegui at the drum kit.

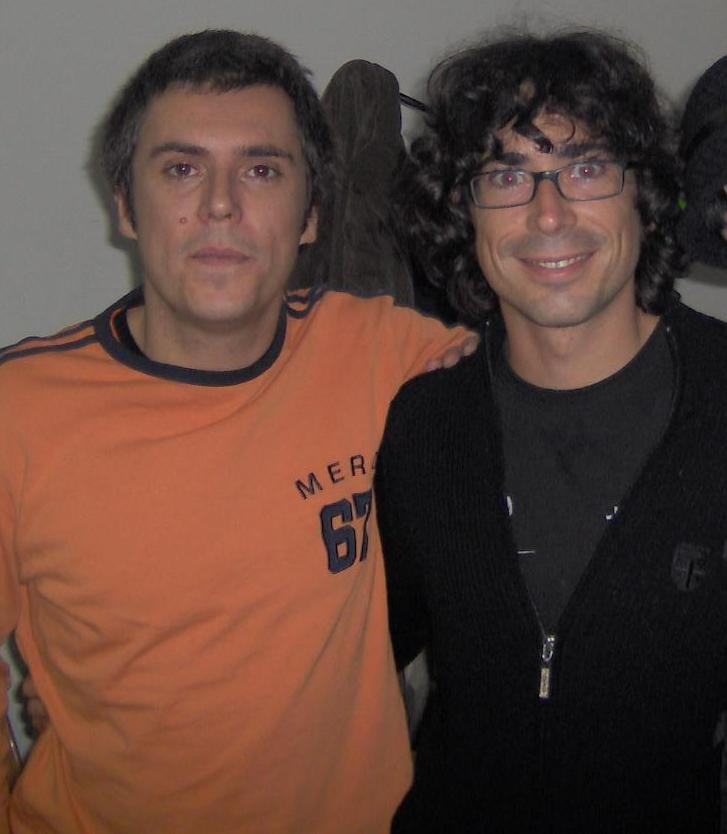
The Ferreiro brothers, to the left, Iván, and to the right, Amaro.

In November 2005, Iván thought up a project called Laboratorio Ñ, consisting of collecting some Spanish and Argentinian musicians in a house at Buenos Aires, to write new songs among friends. Some of these musicians were Juan Aguirre and Eva Amaral (Amaral), Xoel López (singer of Deluxe) or Quique González.

In October 2006, he released Las siete y media, a mini-album with 8 songs (7 and a half, as in Iván words) written during the Tournedo tour. In 2008, he released a new album Mentiroso Mentiroso, followed by Picninc Extraterrestre in 2010 and his most recent album Confesiones de un artista de mierda recorded in 2011 live in front of an audience as a combination of new songs, collaborations and a new reading of some of Los Piratas and his own greatest hits.

== Discography ==
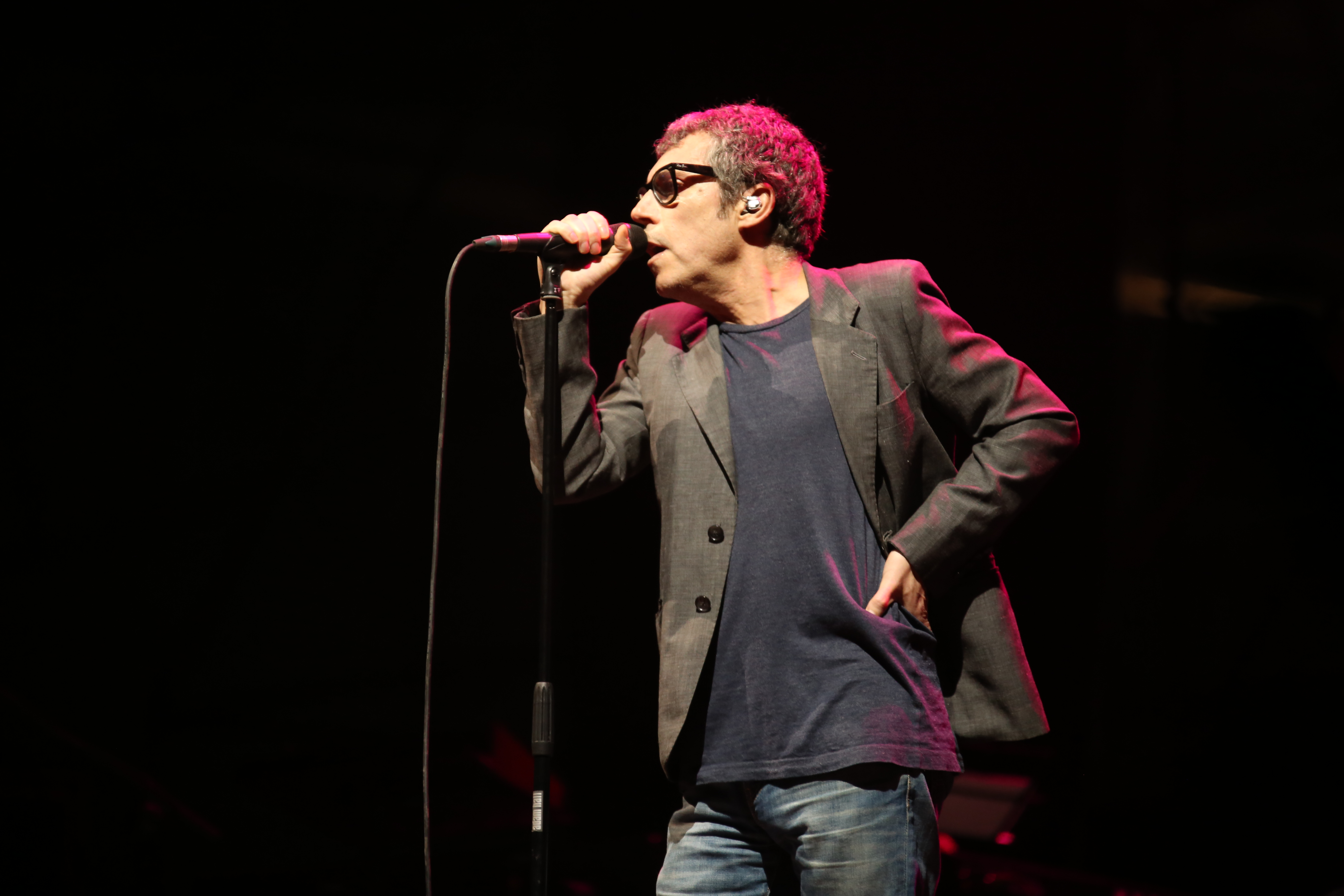
Iván Ferreiro in Valladolid in 2016

As of 2016, Iván Ferreiro has released four solo albums.

Information
Canciones para el tiempo y la distancia (CD & DVD)
- Released: 1 April 2005
- Recorded in Val Miñor, Fisterra, Galapagar & Madrid
- Produced by Suso Sáiz.
- Tracks:

1. "Canciones para el tiempo y la distancia" ("Songs for the time and the distance")
2. "El viaje de Chihiro" ("Chihiro's journey", Spanish title for Spirited Away)
3. "Turnedo"
4. "Mrs. P"
5. "S.P.N.B." (Abbreviations of "Son preciosos nuestros besos": "Our kisses are precious")
6. "Estrella de la muerte" ("Death Star")
7. "Abrázame" ("Embrace me")
8. "Espectáculo" ("Spectacle")
9. "Ciudadano A" ("Citizen A", referring to José María Aznar)
10. "Mi furia paranoica" ("My paranoid fury")

Las siete y media (EP)
- Released: 30 October 2006
- Recorded in Estudio del Cielito (Buenos Aires), Apostolik Ladies Studio (Nigrán) and Brazil (Madrid), April 2006
- Tracks:

1. "Fotogramas" ("Frames")
2. "Carnaval y safari" ("Carnival and safari")
3. "Extrema pobreza" ("Extreme poverty")
4. "Me toca tirar" ("It's my turn to throw")
5. "Piensa en frío" ("Think cold")
6. "Tristeza" ("Sadness")
7. "La distorsión" ("The distortion")
8. "Días azules" ("Blue days")

Collaborations Més raons de pes. El tribut a Umpah-Pah CD (2009), collaboration with Enrique Bunbury, Amparanoia and Pep Blay as art director.
