= La orquesta del Titanic =

Studio album by Joan Manuel Serrat & Joaquín Sabina
- Released: February 6, 2012
- Length: 50:10
- Label: Sony Music
- Producer: Javier Limón

Joan Manuel Serrat chronology
Hijo de la luz y de la sombra (2010)	La orquesta del Titanic (2012)	Serrat & Sabina en el Luna Park (2012)

Joaquín Sabina chronology
Vinagre y rosas (2009)	La orquesta del Titanic (2012)	Serrat & Sabina en el Luna Park (2012)

La orquesta del Titanic ("The Titanic's orchestra") is the second joint studio album by Joan Manuel Serrat and Joaquín Sabina after Dos pájaros de un tiro ("Two birds with one stone") in 2007.

The name of the album is a nod to the musicians of the RMS Titanic, as the album was released in a context of financial crisis and troubled times in different aspects of life. Sabina stated in an interview, "As Spain goes adrift, we play on, as in the Titanic."

The album's release led the two musicians to embark in their second joint tour, named Dos pájaros contraatacan ("Two birds strike back"). This tour also resulted in a live album recorded at Estadio Luna Park in Buenos Aires, Argentina, that would be released in November 2012.

== Track listing ==
All songs written by Joan Manuel Serrat and Joaquín Sabina.

No.	Title	Length
1.	"La orquesta del Titanic"	4:52
2.	"Después de los despueses"	4:43
3.	"Idiotas, palizas y calientabraguetas"	3:44
4.	"Canción de Navidad"	3:34
5.	"Quince o veinte copas"	4:16
6.	"Acuérdate de mí"	4:20
7.	"Hoy por ti, mañana por mí"	4:10
8.	"Dolent de mena (Malo por naturaleza)"	5:00
9.	"Martínez"	4:50
10.	"Cuenta conmigo"	4:47
11.	"Maldito blues"	5:54
Total length:		50:10

== Charts ==
=== Weekly charts ===
Weekly chart performance for La orquesta del Titanic
Chart (2012)	Peak position
Spanish Albums (PROMUSICAE)	1

=== Year-end charts ===
Year-end chart performance for La orquesta del Titanic
Chart (2012)	Position
Spanish Albums (PROMUSICAE)	7

== Certifications ==
Region	Certification	Certified units/sales
Mexico (AMPROFON)	Gold	30,000^{^}
Spain (PROMUSICAE)	2× Platinum	80,000^{^}
^{^} Shipments figures based on certification alone.
