= Deluxe (musician) =

Xoel López
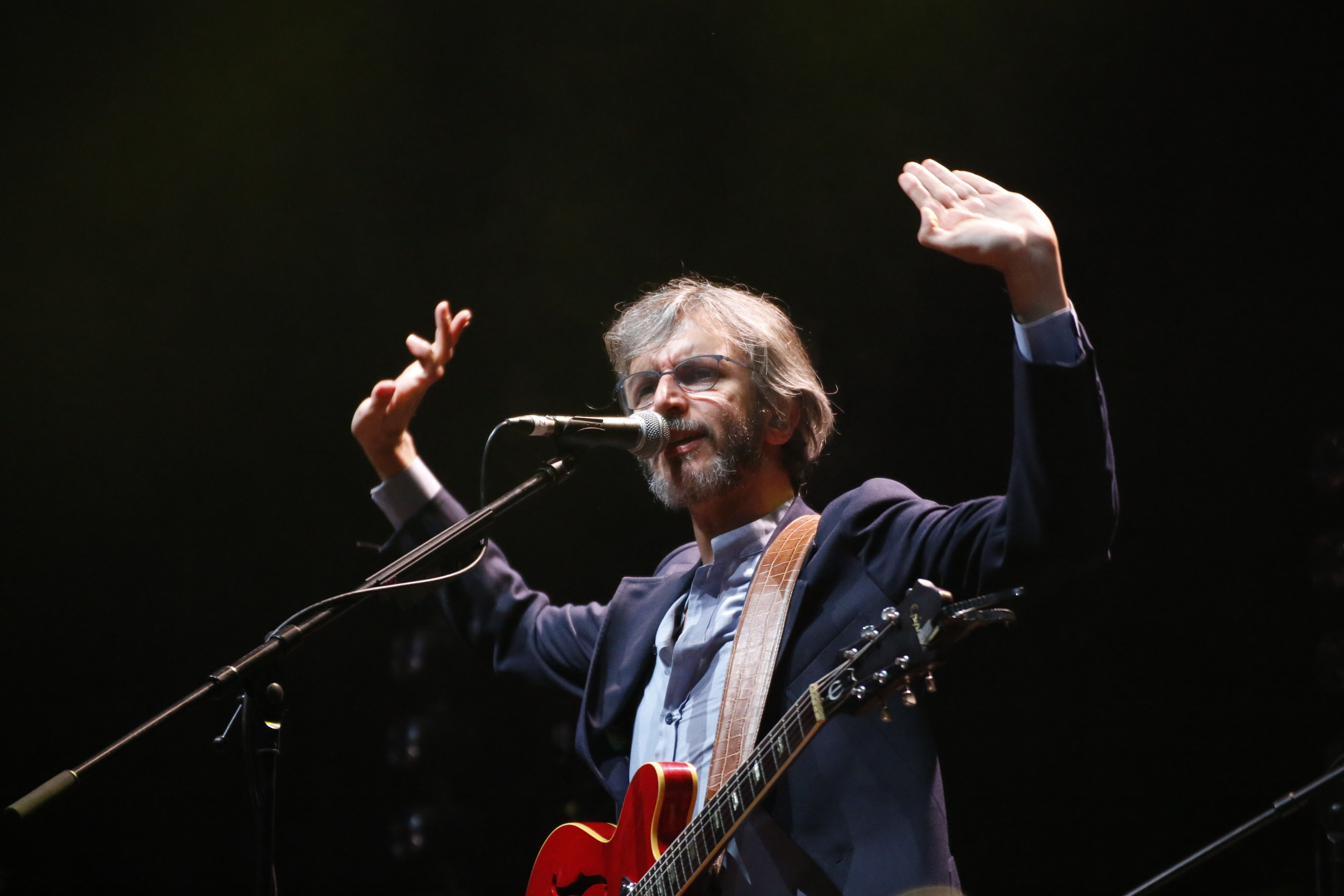
- López in 2018.

Background information
- Born: Xoel López García-Cabezón; 12 August 1977 (age 48); A Coruña, Galicia
- Genres: Pop; alternative rock; folk rock
- Years active: 2000–present
- Labels: EMI; Mushroom Pillow
- Website: xoel.com

Xoel López (born 12 August 1977) is a Spanish alternative rock musician, formerly known as Deluxe, from A Coruña, Galicia.

Early in his career, López sang in English, but has since released albums in Spanish. In a 2017 interview with Jot Down, López describes his shift from singing in English to singing in Spanish, explaining that he experienced pressure early in his career to sing in English, but says that, later, “I made a decision [to sing in Spanish] and I don’t know if it was the correct one, but at least it was more in harmony with what I was feeling.”

Lara Hermoso and Arturo Lezcano from Jot Down describe this shift in language and López’s decision to leave behind his moniker Deluxe as a process of reinvention “with the sole objective of being true to himself.”

In a 2015 interview with Efe Eme, López describes his songwriting process as one that tries to avoid “intellectualization” of his music: “I seek, as best as possible, to be primitive and wild,” explaining that he has several developed songwriting methods.

In a 2019 interview with A La Contra, López describes his relationship to his region of origin as important to his life and work, saying, “My way of understanding the world is very Galician.”

== Tours and appearances ==
- In Spain, at Festimad, Festival Internacional de Benicàssim (2002, 2003 and 2005), Sonorama, Contempopranea, Espárrago Rock, Festival do Norte.
- With Juan Aguirre from Amaral.
- At Laboratorio Ñ, a Spanish-Argentinian music camp with Iván Ferreiro
- With Amaral and Quique González.
- In Germany in the North Rhine-Westphalia land during the 2006 FIFA World Cup

His first band was Los Covers. His second band Elephant Band had a lot of success. His records have been recorded under Mushroom Pillow records. He released Fin de un viaje infinito (End of an Infinite Journey) in 2007 for Virgin Records. His record Los Jóvenes Mueren Antes de Tiempo was considered the best of the year 2005 by the Spanish edition of the Rolling Stone magazine.].

He has a very good rapport with Portuguese band The Gift, with each having opened a show for the other.

His first album under his own name, Atlántico, was released in 2012.

Sueños y Pan released in 2017 under his name was nominated for IMPALA's European Album of the Year Award.

== Discography ==
- Not What You Had Thought (2001)
- We Create, We Destroy (2003)
- If Things Were to Go Wrong (2004)
- Los Jóvenes Mueren Antes de Tiempo (2005)
- Fin de un viaje infinito (2007)
- Reconstrucción (2008)
- Atlántico (2012)
- Paramales (2015)
- Sueños y pan (2017)
