= Tequila (band) =

Argentine-Spanish rock band

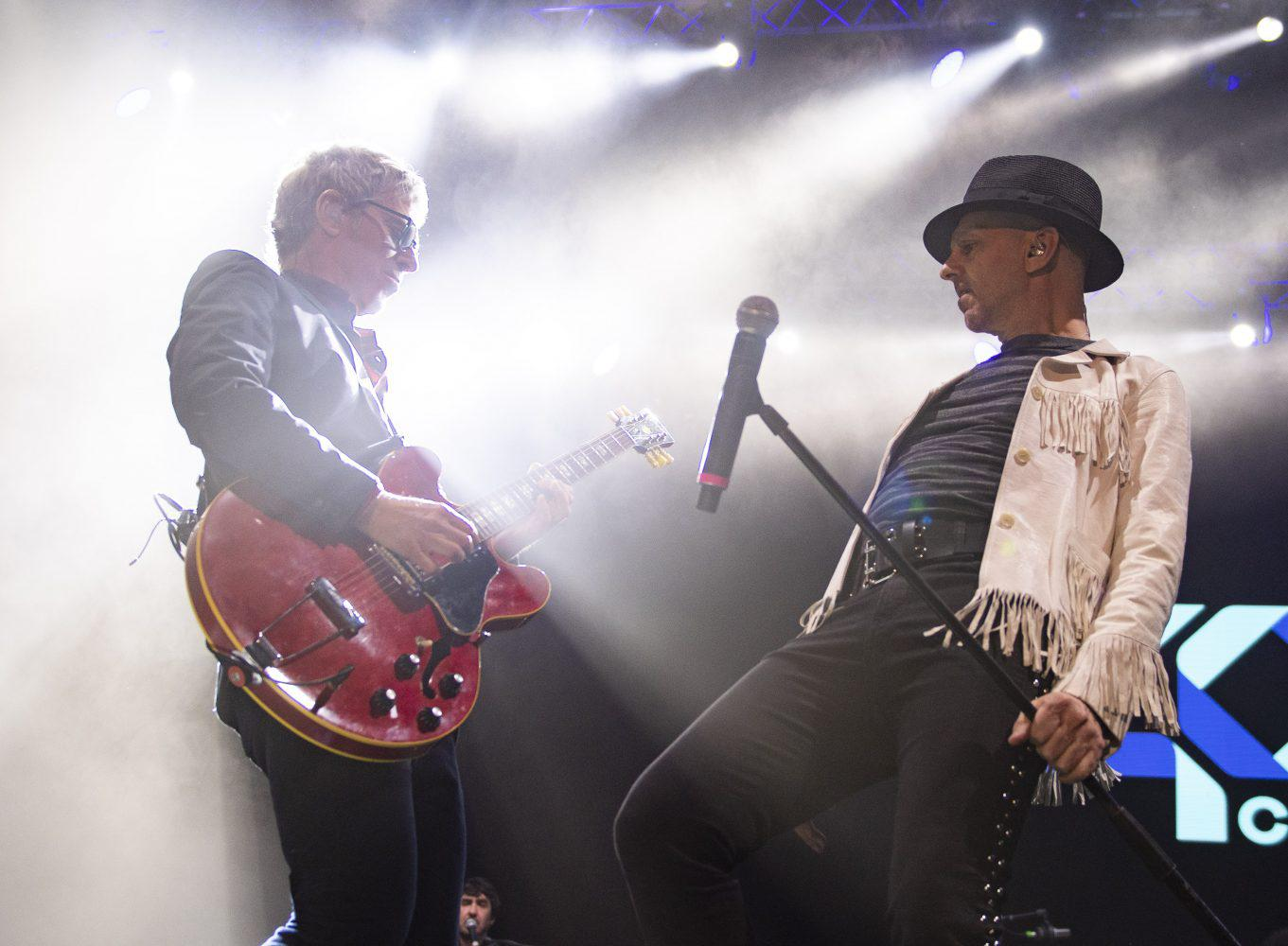
- Tequila performing in 2019

Background information
- Origin: Argentina; Spain
- Genres: Rock; blues rock; pop rock
- Years active: 1976–1982; 2008; 2018–2021
- Past members: Alejo Stivel; Ariel Rot; Julian Infante; Felipe Lipe; Manolo Churches

Tequila was an Argentine-Spanish rock band, active between 1976 and 1982. The group consisted of Ariel Rot (guitar), Alejo Stivel (vocals), Julián Infante (guitar), Felipe Lipe (bass), and Manolo Iglesias (drums). They released four studio albums, one live record, and several compilations. The band briefly reunited in 2008, and they toured from 2018 to 2021.

== History ==
Tequila emerged in 1976, a year after the fall of the Franco regime; they were part of the la Movida Madrileña movement. Influenced by artists such as Chuck Berry and the Rolling Stones, they played a mix of rock, blues rock, and pop rock. Tequila broke up in 1982, after having released four studio albums. The song "Me estás atrapando otra vez", intended for a planned fifth album, later appeared on the 1993 Los Rodríguez album, Sin documentos.

Reunions

Tequila have reunited several times, including in 2008 (minus Gutierrez). In 2018, the band launched a tour and released the song "Yo quería ser normal", which served as the theme for the film Superlópez. The final date of the tour, initially set for March 2020, was postponed until 2021, due to the COVID-19 pandemic. A live DVD, titled Adiós Tequila! En vivo, was released in 2019.

== Band members ==
- Alejo Stivel – vocals
- Ariel Rot – lead guitar
- Julián Infante – rhythm guitar
- Felipe Gutierrez – bass
- Manolo Iglesias – drums

== Discography ==
=== Studio albums ===
- Matrícula de Honor (1978)
- Rock and roll (1979)
- Viva! Tequila! (1980)
- Confidencial (1981)

=== Live albums ===
- Adiós Tequila! En vivo (2019)

=== Compilations ===
- Éxitos (1982)
- Tequila (1990)
- Tequila Forever (1999)
- Salta!!! (2001)
- Lo mejor de la edad de oro del pop español (2001)
- Vuelve Tequila (2008)
