= Ariel Rot =

Argentine musician (born 1960)

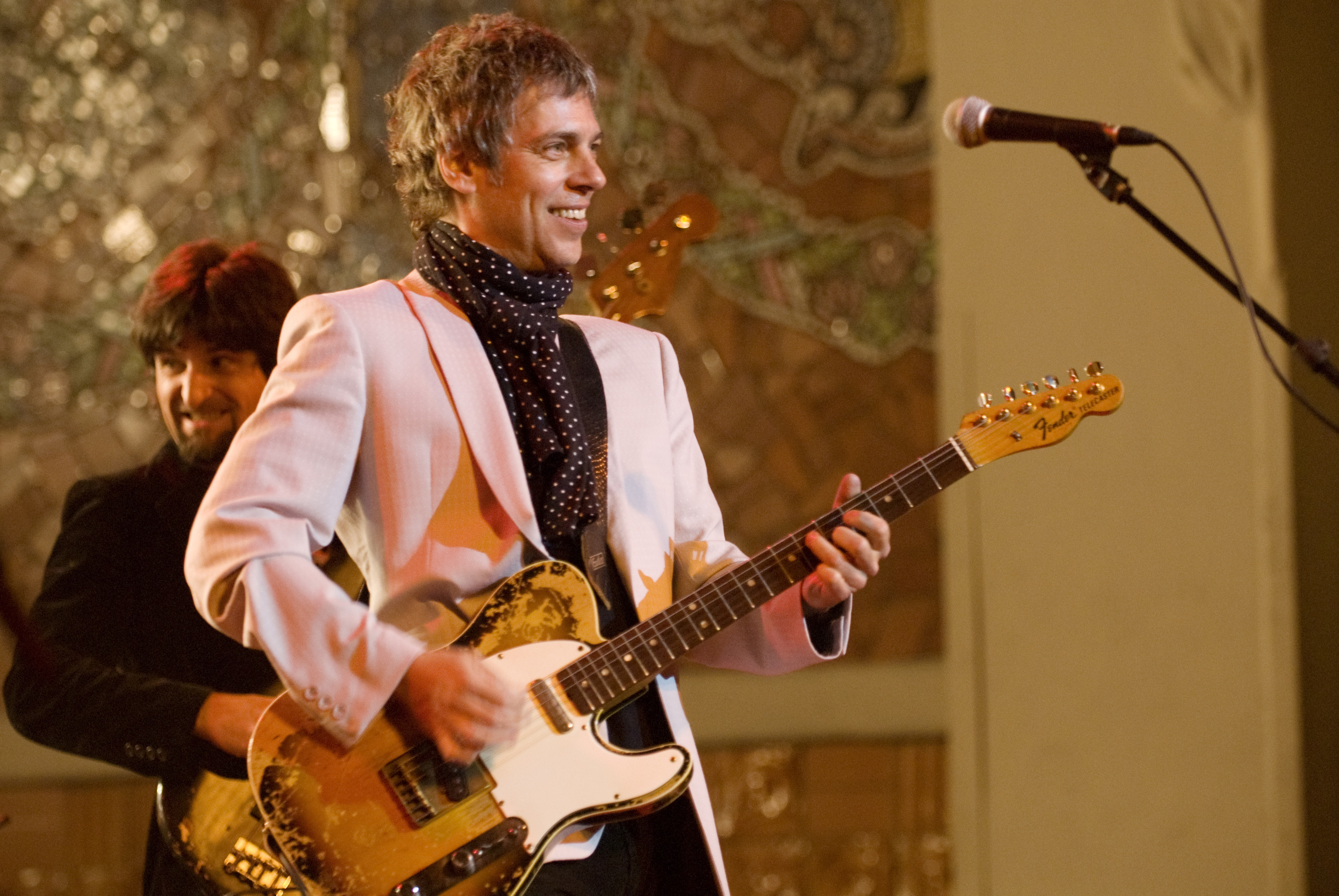
- Rot in 2007
- Born: Ariel Eduardo Rotenberg Gutkin; 19 April 1960 (age 66); Buenos Aires, Argentina
- Occupation: Musician
- Musical career
- Origin: Spain
- Genres: Rock
- Instruments: Guitar; piano; vocals
- Formerly of: Tequila; Los Rodríguez
- Website: arielrot.com

Ariel Eduardo Rotenberg Gutkin (born 19 April 1960), better known as Ariel Rot, is an Argentine musician.

== Career ==
Gutkin moved to Spain when he was young and became a member of the group Tequila. Following their split in 1982, he launched a solo career, after which he joined the group Los Rodríguez, which broke up in 1997. In 2007, Gutkin recorded Duos, trios y perversiones, an album that included his most popular songs and featured artists such as Enrique Bunbury from Heroes del Silencio, Andrés Calamaro, and Quique Gonzalez.

His sister, Cecilia Roth, is an actress.

== Discography ==
=== with Tequila ===
- Matrícula de Honor (1978)
- Rock and Roll (1979)
- Viva Tequila (1980)
- Confidencial (1981)

=== with Los Rodríguez ===
- Buena Suerte (1991)
- Disco Pirata (1992)
- Sin Documentos (1993)
- Palabras más, palabras menos (1995)
- Hasta luego (1996)
- Para no olvidar (2002)

=== Solo ===
- Debajo del puente (1983)
- Vértigo (1985)
- Hablando solo (1997)
- Cenizas en el aire (1999)
- En vivo mucho mejor (2001)
- Lo siento Frank (2003)
- Acústico (2003)
- Ahora piden tu cabeza (2005)
- Duos, trios y otras perversiones (2007)
- Solo Rot (2010)
- La Huesuda (2013)
- La Manada (2016)
