= Los Rodríguez =

Spanish-Argentine rock band

- Origin: Madrid, Spain
- Genres: Rock and roll; Latin rock; blues rock
- Years active: 1991–1997
- Labels: Pasión; DRO; Grabaciones Accidentales
- Past members: Andrés Calamaro; Ariel Rot; Julián Infante (†); Germán Vilella; Daniel Zamora (†)
- Website: Los Rodríguez

Los Rodríguez were a rock band composed of two Argentines, two Spaniards and one Puerto Rican that played during the 1990s.

== History ==
The group was born in 1991 when Julián Infante and Germán Vilella, who had group called Fuera de la ley was asked by RTVE to create a band to make covers of The Rolling Stones , they called Ariel Rot who were in the band Tequila with Infante. Rot asked Andrés Calamaro (from the band Los Abuelos de la Nada) to join the band and they started touring around small clubs in Madrid.

In 1991 their first album, Buena Suerte, was released.

Their 1993 album Sin documentos brought the band to the hit parade. With songs as "Dulce condena", "Sin documentos", "Mi rock perdido", and "Me estás atrapando otra vez".

The next album, 1995's Palabras más, palabras menos, was another success. The album contains "Mucho Mejor" (with Coque Malla), "Todavía una canción de amor" (with lyrics by Joaquín Sabina, whom they toured with that year) and "Milonga del marinero y el capitán".

In 1997 they released Hasta luego, a compilation album, and went on tour. The band broke apart due to economic conflicts.

Julian Infante was diagnosed with HIV/AIDS and died on 4 December 2000 in a clinic in Madrid.

On 29 November 2007, Daniel Zamora (the last bass guitar player of the band) committed suicide in his hometown Palafrugell.

== Music ==
Their music is a fusion of different styles including rock, rumba, bolero, ranchera, milonga, funk and blues.

Despite their short career, their success contributed to the Spanish music market returning attention to bands that sing in Spanish and have Spanish roots.

== Members ==
- Andrés Calamaro: Singer, keyboards and songwriter
- Ariel Rot: Lead guitarist, singer and songwriter
- Julián Infante: Rhythm guitarist, songwriter
- Daniel Zamora: Bass guitar (since 1993)
- Germán Vilella: Drums

Non-members who collaborated with the band at different times were:

- Candi Avelló and Guillermo Martín: Bass guitar

== Discography ==
=== Albums ===
- Buena suerte (1991)
- Disco Pirata (1992)
- Sin documentos (1993)
- Palabras más, palabras menos (1995)
- Hasta luego (1997)

=== Singles ===
- "Engánchate conmigo" (1991)
- "A los ojos" (1991)
- "Dispara" (1991)
- "No estoy borracho" (1992)
- "Dulce condena" (1993)
- "Sin documentos" (1993)
- "Salud, dinero y amor" (1993)
- "Mi rock perdido" (1994)
- "Milonga del marinero y el capitán" (1995)
- "Palabras más, palabras menos" (1995)
- "Aquí no podemos hacerlo" (1995)
- "Todavía una canción de amor" (1995)
- "Para no olvidar" (1996)
- "Mucho mejor" (1996)
- Acoustic version "Mucho mejor" (1996)
- 96' version "Mi enfermedad" (1996)
- "Copa rota" (1996)
