= Fernando Valverde (poet) =

Spanish-American poet and academic

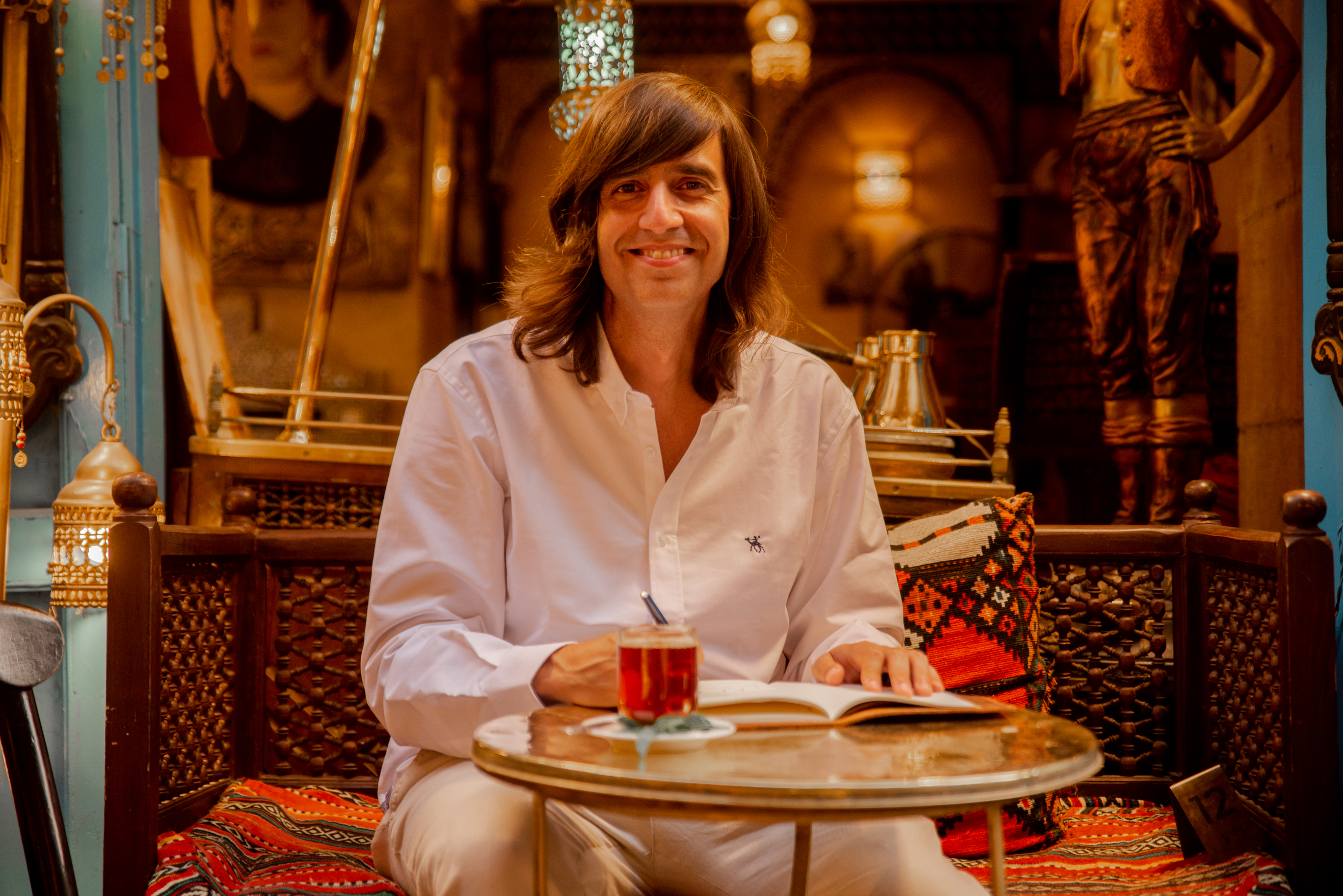
- Fernando Valverde
- Born: June 9, 1980 (age 46); Granada, Spain
- Occupations: Poet, academic
- Writing career
- Language: Spanish
- Years active: 1997–present
- Genre: Poetry
- Notable works: America, The Insistence of Harm, The Men Who Killed My Mother

Fernando Valverde (born June 9, 1980, in Granada, Spain) is a Spanish-American poet and academic. He is an associate professor at the University of Virginia.

== Early life and education ==
Valverde was born in Granada, Spain. He studied Spanish and Hispano-American literature and earned a PhD in this field. In 2019, he completed a second PhD in education.

== Career ==
Valverde began his career as a journalist for El País, where he wrote on cultural and social topics.

He is the author of several poetry collections, including The Insistence of Harm (University Press of Florida, 2019), translated by Allen Josephs and Laura Juliet Wood. The collection consists of lyric poems that explore themes such as war, illness, and loss across different geographical settings. He also published America (Copper Canyon Press, 2021), translated into English by Carolyn Forché.

In 2025, he published The Men Who Killed My Mother (bilingual edition), translated by Gordon E. McNeer and distributed by the University of Chicago Press. The collection has been described as a bilingual poetry volume addressing themes of violence, memory, and the figure of the mother.

In 2026, a collected edition of his poetry, Poesía (1997–2025), was published by Visor.

Valverde is an associate professor at the University of Virginia, where he teaches poetry and Romanticism.

He is a co-founder of the International Festival of Poetry in Granada, which he co-directed for several years. The festival has featured internationally recognized writers, including Nobel laureates such as Wole Soyinka, Herta Müller, Derek Walcott, and Mario Vargas Llosa.

== Reception ==
Valverde’s work has received attention in literary and academic publications. His collection America has been discussed in literary contexts in relation to themes such as history and cultural identity.

Valverde’s poetry has been the subject of sustained literary and academic criticism. Literary scholar Laura Scarano has examined his work in terms of spatial and emotional representation, describing it through the concept of “internal geographies”. In Spanish literary criticism, Jorge Boccanera has discussed his poetry in Cuadernos Hispanoamericanos, situating it within contemporary Spanish-language poetry.

Poet Charles Simic described America as a work of notable “ambition and originality”, while Jericho Brown has referred to the collection as containing “powerful poems of international importance”.

Valverde’s work has also received attention in contemporary literary criticism. In El Cultural, critic Luis María Ansón discussed The Men Who Killed My Mother in relation to themes of memory and violence in recent poetry.

Valverde has written on topics related to technology and imagination. In an article published in El País, he is presented as a scholar of Romanticism.

Valverde’s poetry has also appeared in Modern Poetry in Translation.

Valverde’s work has been presented in academic and literary institutions internationally. He participated in a reading at Yale University and in poetry events at Emory University. He has also participated in academic events in Europe, including an invited lecture at the University of Bremen.

In Latin America, his work has been presented in both academic and cultural contexts. He has participated in activities at the National Autonomous University of Mexico (UNAM), and his collection America has been presented and discussed in Mexico, including coverage by Milenio and La Jornada.

His collected volume Poesía (1997–2025), published by Visor in 2026, brings together poems written over nearly three decades. His poetry has received critical attention in the Arab world, including through the Arabic translation of his collection The Insistence of Harm, discussed by Ali Ata in Independent Arabia. In an article published in Al-Masry Al-Youm, Egyptian poet Ahmed al-Shahawi described Valverde as “one of the essential names in Spanish-language poetry worldwide.”

== Awards ==
Valverde has received several literary awards, including the Federico García Lorca Poetry Prize and the Antonio Machado International Literature Prize.

In 2009, he was awarded the Emilio Alarcos Poetry Prize for his collection Los ojos del pelícano.

He was nominated for a Latin Grammy Award in 2014 for a collaboration with flamenco singer Juan Pinilla.

He is an academic corresponding member of the North American Academy of the Spanish Language (ANLE).

He has received the José Martí Award, presented by the National Collegiate Hispanic Honor Society Sigma Delta Pi in recognition of contributions to the teaching of Hispanic culture in the United States.

== Selected publications ==
=== Poetry collections in English ===
- 2025: The Men Who Killed My Mother (United States: Chicago University Press) ISBN 978-1-961056-09-1 Translation by Gordon E. McNeer.
- 2021: America (United States: Copper Canyon Press) ISBN 978-1-55659-622-3 Translation by Carolyn Forché.
- 2019: The Insistence of Harm (United States: Florida University Press) ISBN 978-0-8130-6435-2 Translation by Allen Josephs.
- 2019: The Eyes of the Pelican (United States: University Press of North Georgia) ISBN 978-0-9882237-4-5 Translation by Gordon E. McNeer.

=== Poetry collections in Spanish ===
- 2026: Poesía (1997-2025) (Spain: Visor Libros) ISBN 979-13-87745-91-2
- 2024: America (Mexico: Vaso Roto) ISBN 978-607-59837-7-6
- 2023: Los hombres que mataron a mi madre (Spain: Visor Libros) ISBN 978-84-9895-494-4
- 2022: Desgracia (Spain: Visor Libros) ISBN 978-84-9895-461-6
- 2017: Poesía (1997-2017) (Spain: Visor Libros) ISBN 978-84-9895-977-2
- 2014: La insistencia del daño (Spain: Visor Libros) ISBN 978-84-9895-860-7
- 2009: Los ojos del pelícano (Spain: Visor Libros) ISBN 978-84-9895-739-6
- 2004: Razones para huir de una ciudad con frío (Spain: Visor Libros) ISBN 978-84-7522-556-2
- 2002: Viento favorable (Spain: Diputación de Huelva) ISBN 978-84-8163-297-2

=== Biography ===
- 2024: Vida de Lord Byron (Mexico: UNAM) ISBN 978-607-30-8908-1
- 2021: La muerte de Adonais: Últimos días de Keats, Shelley y Lord Byron (Mexico: UNAM) ISBN 978-607-30-5207-8 and (Spain: Planeta) ISBN 978-84-08-26925-0

=== Translations ===
- Ragioni. Translated into Italian by Andrea Perciaccante. Rome: Lepisma Edizioni, 2005.
- Mentre la vita brucia. Antologia poetica (1997–2020). Translated into Italian by Emilio Coco. Rimini: Raffaelli Editore, 2020.
- Igre z Ognjem. Translated into Slovenian by Aleš Šteger. Ljubljana: Poetikonove Lire, 2025.
- Sólo el amor nos salva. Selected poems translated into Arabic by Salma Moutaouakkil. The Hague: Mesopotamia, 2025.
- مختارات شعرية (Antología poética). Selected poems translated into Arabic by Salma Moutaouakkil. Baghdad: Fundación Ebjed, 2025.
- أثر يقود إليك (Un camino hacia ti). Translated into Arabic by Sara Hamid Hawass. Cairo: Diwan Books, 2026.
- Am Văzut Cum Mi-a Ars Casa. Translated into Romanian by Ioana Barta. Bucharest: Integral, 2026.
- Heaven and Earth. Translated into English by Gordon E. McNeer and Allen Josephs. London: Bayan Street, 2026.
- Poeme. Translated into Romanian by Monica Manolachi. Bucharest: Max Blecher, 2026.
- Gli uomini che ammazzarono mia madre. Translated into Italian by Stefania Di Leo. San Giorgio del Sannio: RP Libri, 2026.
- 我把孤独挂在一条绳子上 (Colgué mi soledad en una cuerda). Translated into Chinese by Fang Miaohong. Beijing: Xion, 2026.

== Personal life ==
Valverde lives in Charlottesville, Virginia. He became a United States citizen in 2024.
