= Benjamin Prado =

Spanish novelist, essayist and poet (born 1961)

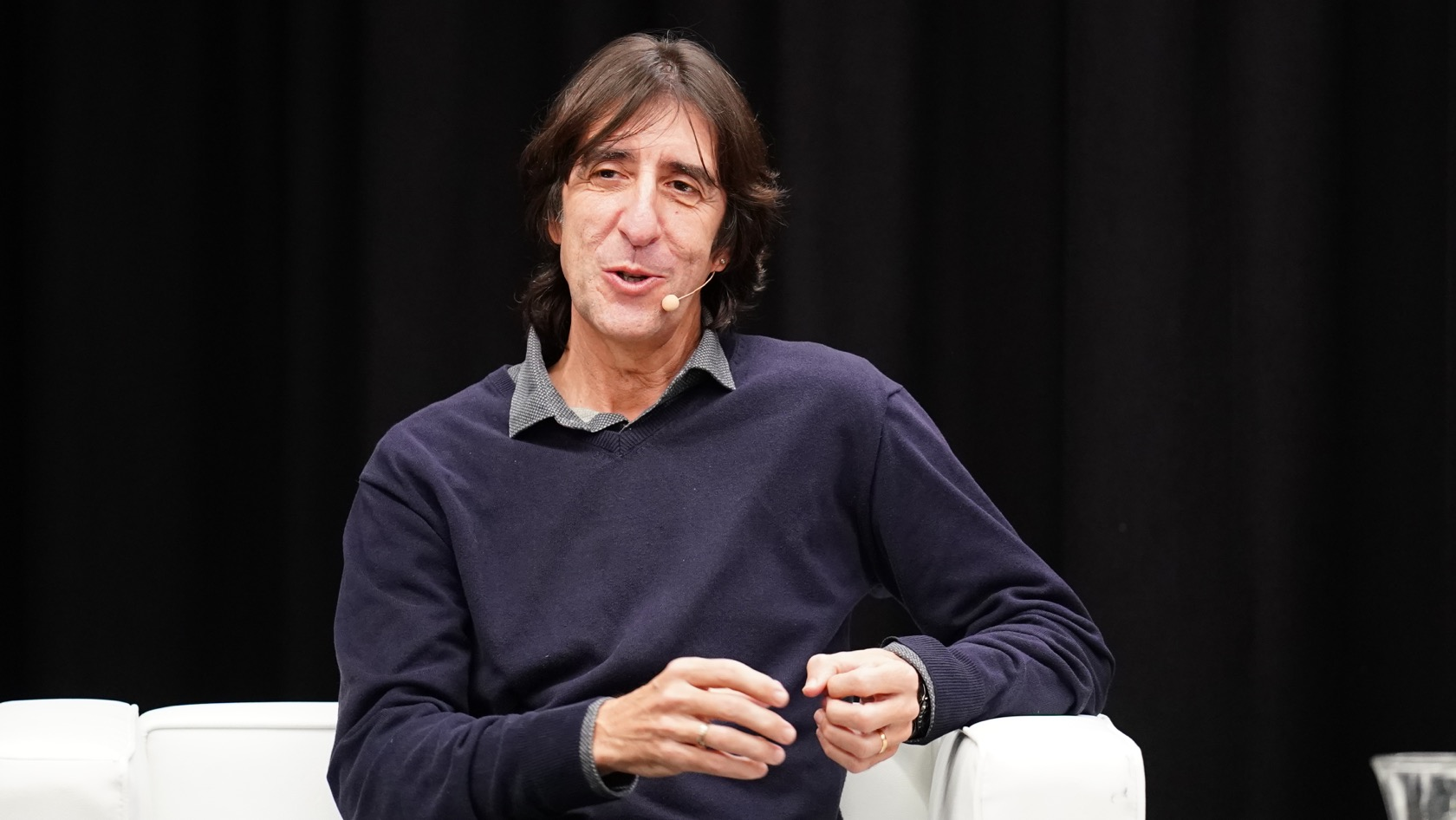
Benjamín Prado in 2020.

Benjamín Prado (born 13 July 1961) is a Spanish novelist, essayist and poet.

He was born in Madrid. He has received several prizes for his work, including the Premio Hiperión, the Premio Internacional Ciudad de Melilla, the Premio Internacional Generación del 27 and the Premio Andalucía de Novela. His work has been translated into numerous languages, including English.

== Works ==
In the field of poetry, Prado's style has been linked to culturalismo, and he has been included in the Generation of '99 alongside authors such as Aurora Luque, Amalia Bautista, and Vicente Gallego.

His first five poetry books—Un caso sencillo (1986); El corazón azul del alumbrado (1990); Asuntos personales (1991); Cobijo contra la tormenta (1995, Hiperión Award); and Todos nosotros (1998)—were compiled alongside previously unpublished poems in the volume Ecuador (2002). He later published Iceberg (2002, Ciudad de Melilla International Poetry Award), and Marea humana (2007, Generación del 27 International Award), both of which included new poems in their second editions. Following an eight-year hiatus, he returned to poetry with Ya no es tarde (2014).

His first novel, Raro (1995), was distributed in Spain and Latin America, and was well-received in Mexico, Argentina, and Colombia. In 1996, he published Nunca le des la mano a un pistolero zurdo and Dónde crees que vas y quién te crees que eres. The latter, written for a young adult audience, was noted as an example of metafiction. He followed these with Alguien se acerca (1998), which explores the stories of people who disappear to start new lives, and No sólo el fuego (1999). Initially titled Zona roja, No sólo el fuego won the XIV Andalucía Novel Award and marked the beginning of his historical fiction focusing on Spain's past. In 2000, he published the crime novel La nieve está vacía.

Outside of the novel format, he published the short story collection Jamás saldré vivo de este mundo (2004), which featured guest contributions from writers Juan Marsé, Javier Marías, Almudena Grandes, and Enrique Vila-Matas.

Prado is also the author of the essays Siete maneras de decir manzana (2001), a defense of lyric poetry, and Los nombres de Antígona (2001), which features biographical profiles of five female writers: Anna Akhmatova, Marina Tsvetaeva, Carson McCullers, María Teresa León, and Isak Dinesen. The latter won the José Ortega y Gasset Essay and Humanities Award in 2002. Additionally, he co-authored the biography Carmen Laforet (2004) with Teresa Rosenvinge, and wrote the autobiographical volumes A la sombra del ángel. 13 años con Alberti (2002) and Romper una canción (2010). His published volumes of aphorisms include Pura lógica (2012), Doble fondo (2014), and Más que palabras (2015).

- 1986 - Un caso sencillo - Poetry
- 1991 - El corazón azul del alumbrado - Poetry
- 1992 - Asuntos personales - Poetry
- 1995 - Cobijo contra la tormenta - Poetry
- 1995 - Raro - Novel
- 1996 - Nunca le des la mano a un pistolero zurdo - Novel
- 1996 - Dónde crees que vas y quién te crees que eres - Novel
- 1998 - Todos nosotros - Poetry
- 1998 - Alguien se acerca - Novel
- 1999 - No sólo el fuego - Novel
- 2000 - La nieve está vacía - Novel
- 2000 - Siete maneras de decir manzana - Essays
- 2001 - Los nombres de Antígona - Essays
- 2002 - Ecuador (poesía 1986-2001) - Poetry (compilation)
- 2002 - Iceberg - Poetry
- 2002 - A la sombra del ángel (13 años con Alberti) - Memoirs
- 2003 - Jamás saldré vivo de este mundo - Stories
- 2004 - Carmen Laforet - Biography, with Teresa Rosenvinge
- 2006 - Marea humana - Poetry
- 2006 - Mala gente que camina - Novel
- 2009 - Romper una canción - Biographical essay
- 2011 - Operación Gladio - Novel
- 2012 - Pura lógica - Aphorisms
- 2013 - Ajuste de cuentas - Novel
- 2013 - Qué escondes en la mano - Stories
- 2014 - Doble fondo - Aphorisms
- 2014 - Ya no es tarde - Poetry
- 2015 - Más que palabras - Aphorisms

== Anthologies ==
- Mi antología Biblioteca de poesía española. Universidad de las Américas. Puebla, México, 2007.
- Aquí y entonces Embajada de España en Cuba. La Habana, Cuba, 2008.
- No me cuentes tu vida Editorial Mesa Redonda. Lima, Perú, 2011.29
- Si dejas de quererme lo sabrá este poema Ediciones La Fragua. San Salvador. El Salvador, 2012.30
- Yo sólo puedo estar contigo o contra mí Círculo de Poesía. México, 2012.31

== Translations into English ==
- Not Only Fire (No sólo el fuego) translated by Sam Richard, Faber & Faber, 2002
- Snow is Silent (La nieve está vacía) translated by Sam Richard, Faber & Faber, 2005
