= Los Piratas =

Spanish rock band

- Origin: Vigo (Galicia)
- Genres: Alternative rock Indie rock Pop rock Indie pop Indietronica
- Years active: 1991–2004
- Labels: Warner Music
- Members: Iván Ferreiro; Paco Serén; Alfonso Román; Javier Fernández, Hal 9000 †; Pablo Álvarez
- Past members: Raúl Quintillán; Suso Saiz
- Website: http://www.lospiratas.org

Los Piratas was a Spanish rock band from Vigo, founded in 1991. They were considered one of the most influential groups in the pop and rock scenes in Spain. They released five studio albums (one of them a gold record), two live albums, three compilations and four albums of rarities, before disbanding in 2004.

The band's influences included Björk, Aphex Twin, Los Planetas, Radiohead, Oasis and 1980s Spanish pop. The group was in both the mainstream and independent scenes, and evolved from pop rock to a sound with electronic touches and greater musical maturity. Their lyrics were initially about relationships, frustrated loves and loves to come, and later became darker and deeper.

== History ==
=== Creation and early years (1989–1994) ===
The band was founded in Vigo, Galicia (Spain) in 1989, when Iván Ferreiro and Paco Serén decide to create a group they call "Los Piratas del Capitán Baroli" ("Capitán Baroli" is a reference to Barullo, a great friend of Iván's). After recording a demo with the catchy song "Somos Pobres", Ivan and Paco start recruiting other members for the band. First they talk to some members of the band "No Grites Tonta", Fernando Romero, Fernando Lorenzo and Miguel Jiménez. Lorenzo and Miguel eventually leave the project and Romero goes to live in the United States. Months later, Los Piratas consolidates as a rock band, with Iván Ferreiro as leader and vocalist, Alfonso Román on guitar, Paco Serén as keyboardist and guitarist, Pablo Álvarez on bass, Javier Fernández, known by the nickname of Hal 9000, on drums and Raúl Quintillán as keyboardist. In October 1992 their first album was released, a live album with the same name, recorded in the CDB hall, produced by Javier Abreu and edited by the Warner label thanks to the wonderful work of their manager at that time Ángeles Rivera, who went with the demo in hand to all the record labels in Madrid. In this work the group followed a style close to pop rock, with psychedelic and blues tints, or rock, and their themes were centered on frustrated love and the love that is to come.

A year later, in 1993, Los Piratas released their first studio album, Quiero hacerte gritar, which included most of the songs from the previous album. In it, the group continued with their pop rock line, present in the previous album, despite having some songs more oriented towards rock and even flamenco. The production and label were the same as in their debut album. With both albums, the group began to reap the rewards of their hard work.

=== Road to success (1995–1997) ===
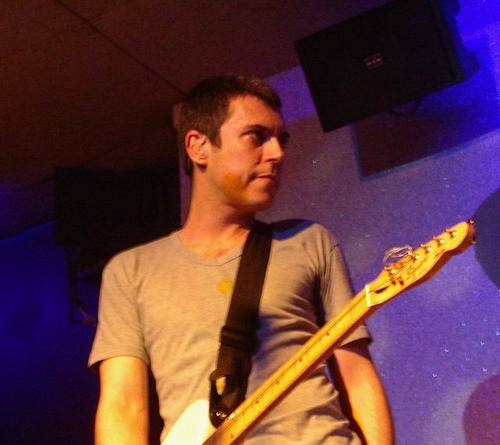
Iván Ferreiro, vocalist of Los Piratas in concert.

The band released in 1995 their second studio album, Poligamia, under the Warner label and the production of Juan Luis Giménez, from Presuntos Implicados, who helped them to get closer to the desired sound, more rock, as well as incorporating more complex elements and samplers. In some songs there are acoustic and experimental elements and they also had the collaboration of the former members of Duncan Dhu, Mikel Erentxun and Diego Vasallo, in the song "Tu perro guardián". They also performed a cover of Tequila's "Dime que me quieres". With this album they got to be broadcast on radio formats and increased their sales considerably.

In 1997 the album Manual para los fieles was released, where Los Piratas evolved into a "warm" rock, that is to say, making their music more complex by adding electronic and fusion bases, such as the use of the hurdy-gurdy and other typical elements of Galician folk. The production was also the responsibility of Juan Luis Giménez and in some tracks they included collaborations with Antón Reixa, Anxo Pintos, Kepa Junkera, Miqui Puig of Los Sencillos and Soledad Giménez. The lyrics changed, becoming darker and deeper. In addition, the song "Mi matadero clandestino" was part of the soundtrack of the Spanish version of the movie Batman and Robin.

=== Fin de la primera parte (1998–2002) ===
In 1998, keyboardist Raúl Quintillán left the group. That year, their record company released a compilation album entitled Fin de la primera parte (End of the first part), with two new songs and with which they sold 50,000 copies. At the beginning of 1999 a second edition was released featuring the song "My Way" by Paul Anka, which would be used by the telephone company Airtel for one of its commercials, which brought the band to a privileged place in the Spanish music scene. Iván Ferreiro commented on this compilation:

That compilation was good for us because it gave us a perspective in time and allowed us to select those songs that we really wanted to play, or rather, we discovered what we really didn't want to play.

=== The success (2001–2003) ===
The group released Ultrasónica in 2001, a work in which influences of international bands such as Radiohead or Oasis could be appreciated. In this way, the band assimilated the electronics of the former and managed to create suffocating atmospheres. The album was recorded, as was Poligamia, in a residential studio in France located in the middle of the countryside and with Juan Luis Jiménez still as producer. At first, the Warner label refused to distribute it because they considered it too commercial for the independent circuit, but it was finally released by the label and became a gold record with more than 50,000 sales. That same year, the album was re-released adding unreleased tracks, remixes, rarities and live tracks. Later, in 2003, they released with unreleased songs Respuestas and Dinero

=== Independent season (2003) ===
In that same year Los Piratas' last studio album, Relax, produced by Suso Saiz and recorded at Estudios IZ, in the Basque Country, was released, with which they left the mainstream scene. It was more dark and electronic than their previous works, losing the protagonism of the guitars and moving away from a more rock sound, which caused it to be received with coldness by critics and the public. He showed himself to be more experimental, opting for ambient, chill-out, blues and jazz orchestrations, among other sounds. The album was re-released that year, adding five new songs, all of them tribute. Later, a special edition was released that included the albums Respuestas and Dinero which contained mainly instrumental songs, thus forming a quadruple album.

=== Fin de la segunda parte and separation (2003–2004) ===
Soon after, rumors began to spread about the separation of the band. On October 23, 2003, a live farewell album was recorded at La Riviera in Madrid, entitled Fin de la segunda parte (End of the second part). It featured collaborations with Enrique Bunbury, El Drogas from Barricada and Amaral, and included both videos of the performance and CD recordings. Los Piratas gave their last concert in December of that year, in the Galileo Galilei hall, and disbanded in February 2004. Iván, leader of the band, commented on the split:

The group broke up because it had to break up, nothing specific happened, we were simply saturated and the best thing to do was to conclude the matter before we started to get along badly so we could continue to be friends.

While the breakup of the band was in the making, Gabi Davila in collaboration with the members of the group wrote "Empatía, Conversaciones con Piratas", the book that summarizes the trajectory of the group from its beginnings.

=== After the separation ===
After splitting up, Iván began a solo career in early 2005, while Alfonso Román formed Trash of Dreams with Suso Saiz, to later start playing individually. On the other hand, Paco Serén and Hal 9000 were part of Ectoplasma until the end of 2007. In 2008 Disco duro was released, a set-box that collected all the re-released studio albums of the band. Each one included short texts written by journalists or people close to the band who talked about it, and some unreleased tracks and never released demos. In addition, the set-box included a DVD with a documentary reviewing the history of Los Piratas and how each album was recorded, photos of the band, unreleased covers and a wide range of material. At the same time, a single CD edition was released, a compilation of the greatest hits, with some unreleased tracks.

== Style and influences ==
The first two albums of Los Piratas were oriented towards pop rock, with intense guitars, sometimes close to blues or psychedelia. This style was described by AllMusic as "rock oriented towards teenagers". In Poligamia they moved closer to rock and in Manual para los fieles they continued along that line, only adding electronic and fusion elements, such as folk. The electronic sound continued in their following works, always with the presence of rock elements, until they definitively separated from it in their last studio album, Relax, in which a darker sound can also be appreciated.

The band cited Björk, Aphex Twin, Los Planetas and Radiohead as influences. Other influences included Oasis and Spanish pop of the 1980s. Los Piratas were also considered one of the most influential groups in the history of Spanish pop and rock music. The group also covered songs by several artists, such as "Las cosas que pasan hoy" (with Anton Reixa) and "Dime Que Me Quieres" by Tequila, "My Way" by Paul Anka, "Bésame Mucho" by Consuelo Velázquez and "Toda una vida" by Nuria Villazán. The group paid tribute to Hombres G with "Ésta es tu vida" and to 091 with "Otros como yo".

Their lyrics initially dealt with relationships, frustrated loves and loves to come, and later became darker and deeper.

== Members ==
=== Last formation ===
- Alfonso Román, guitar (1991–2004).
- Iván Ferreiro, voice and guitar (1991–2004).
- Javier Fernández, Hal 9000 drums (1991–2004).
- Pablo Álvarez, bass (1991–2004).
- Paco Serén, guitar and keyboards (1991–2004).

=== Former members ===
- Raúl Quintillán, keyboards (1991–1998).

== Discography ==
=== Studio albums ===
- Quiero hacerte gritar (1993)
- Poligamia (1995)
- Manual para los fieles (1997)
- Ultrasónica (2001)
- Relax (2003)

=== Live albums ===
- Los Piratas (1992)
- Fin de la segunda parte (2004)

=== Compilation albums ===
- Fin (de la primera parte) (1998)
- Disco duro (2008)

=== Rarities albums ===
- Sesiones Perdidas de Ultrasónica (2001)
- Respuestas (2003)
- Dinero (2003)
