= Quique González (singer) =

Spanish singer-songwriter

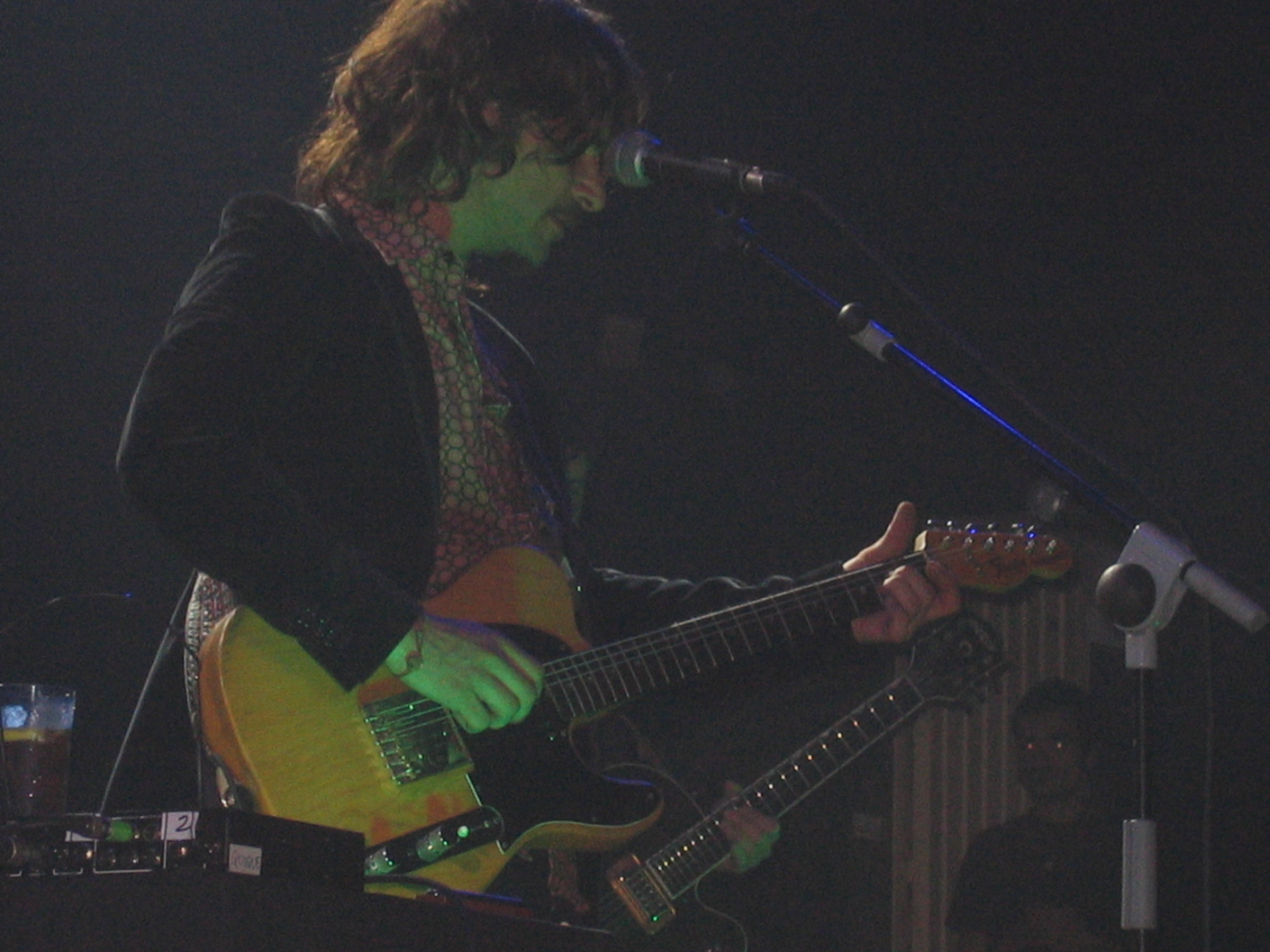
González performing in Granada in 2006

Enrique González Morales (born 1973), better known as Quique González, is a Spanish singer-songwriter known throughout the continent for his approachable and natural writing style. González was born in Madrid.

== Career ==
Following less-than-successful exploits in Mallorca and London, he returned to Madrid in order to pursue his love of music. González began performing locally and collaborating with artists like Enrique Urquijo. González's song "Aunque Tú No Lo Sepas" appeared on one of Urquijo's records, leading to the pair performing the song live on television in 1998. The appearance offered González his first national exposure. A two-song demo entitled "Cantautores: La Nueva Generación" quickly followed. Frustrated in talks with Polygram, González decided to release his full-length debut independently, though it floundered without major-label support. The album's quality, however, secured a contract with Polygram, who released González's sophomore effort, Salitre 48, in 2001. González's reputation as a writer with wry wit and personal sensitivity grew with the release of Pájaros Mojados in 2002. As the record industry shifted beneath him, González sought an alternative to working with the multi-national labels he claimed were preoccupied with pop stars and reality television. He established Varsovia!!! Records in 2003 with the release of Kamikazes Enamorados. He released a total of two records on his boutique label before signing with the Spanish powerhouse label DRO Atlantic. His pursuits with the label, including Ajuste de Cuentas (2006) and Avería y Redencíon (2007), became the most successful of his career.

González's 2013 album Delantera Mítica (Last Tour Records) was voted best album of 2013 by the readers of Rolling Stone Spain.

== Discography ==
=== Albums ===
- Personal
- Salitre 48
- Pájaros Mojados
- Kamikazes Enamorados
- La Noche Americana
- Ajuste De Cuentas
- Avería Y Redención
- Daiquiri Blues
- Delantera Mítica
- Sur En El Valle
- Daiquiri Blues
- 1973

=== Singles ===
==== Personal ====
- "Personal"
- "Y los conserjes de noche"
- "Cuando éramos reyes"

==== Salitre 48 ====
- "La ciudad del viento"
- "39 grados"
- "Crece la hierba"
- "Salitre"

==== Pájaros mojados ====
- "Pájaros mojados"
- "Torres de Manhattan

==== Kamikazes enamorados ====
- "Calles de Madrid"

==== La noche americana ====
- "Vidas cruzadas"

==== Ajuste de cuentas ====
- "Caminando en círculos"
