= Los Premios 40 Principales 2006 =

Spanish music awards ceremony

- Date: December 16, 2006
- Location: Madrid, Spain
- Presented by: Los 40
- Hosted by: Frank Blanco, Sira Fernández and Tony Aguilar
- Website: los40.com/tag/los40_music_awards/a/

Television/radio coverage
- Network: 40 TV

The first edition of the LOS40 Music Awards were held at the Palacio de Deportes de la Comunidad de Madrid on December 16, 2006. It was hosted by Frank Blanco, Sira Fernández and Tony Aguilar and marked the 40th anniversary of the radio station.

== Awards ==
Spain
Best Song	Best Video
El Canto del Loco — "Volverá": Amaral — "Resurrección"; Diego Martín and Raquel del Rosario — "Déjame Verte"; La Oreja de Van Gogh — "Muñeca de Trapo"; Pereza — "Todo"	David Bisbal — "¿Quién Me Iba a Decir?": Nena Daconte — "Idiota"; Dover — "Let Me Out"; Estopa — "Vacaciones"; La Oreja de Van Gogh — "Muñeca de Trapo"
Best Album	Best Artist
La Oreja de Van Gogh — Guapa: Estopa — Voces de Ultrarrumba; Fito & Fitipaldis — Por la Boca Vive el Pez; Diego Martín — Vivir No Sólo Es Respirar; Ana Torroja — Me Cuesta Tanto Olvidarte	David Bisbal: David DeMaría; Chenoa; Fito & Fitipaldis; Ana Torroja
Best Group	Best New Act
El Canto del Loco: Dover; Estopa; La Oreja de Van Gogh; Pereza	Nena Daconte: Edurne; Huecco; Diego Martín; Sr. Trepador
Best Tour	
El Canto del Loco — Zapatillas 2006 Tour: Celtas Cortos — Retomando Tour 2006; Estopa — Ultrarrumbe Tour; La Oreja de Van Gogh — Guapa Tour; Ana Torroja — La Fuerza del Destino Tour	
International
Best Song	Best Act
Shakira (featuring Wyclef Jean) — "Hips Don't Lie": Green Day — "Wake Me Up When September Ends"; Madonna — "Hung Up"; Lucie Silvas — "Nothing Else Matters"; Julieta Venegas — "Me Voy"	Shakira: Madonna; Maná; Red Hot Chili Peppers; Julieta Venegas
Best New Act	
Lucie Silvas: James Blunt; Kelly Clarkson; Pussycat Dolls; Corinne Bailey Rae	

== Performances ==
=== Main show ===
- Dover — "Let Me out"
- Jamelia — "Something About You"
- David Bisbal — "¿Quién Me Iba a Decir?"
- Moby and Amaral — Escapar
- Lucie Silvas — "Nothing Else Matters"
- Paulina Rubio — "Ni Una Sola Palabra"

=== Concerts ===
- Antonio Orozco
- Julieta Venegas
- Maná (featuring Juan Luis Guerra)
