= Los Premios 40 Principales for Best Spanish Group =

Former Spanish music award

Premios 40 Principales for Best Spanish Group
- Awarded for: Best in Spanish and International music
- Country: Spain
- Presented by: Los 40 Principales
- First award: 2006
- Final award: 2010
- Website: www.premios40principales.es

The Premio 40 Principales for Best Spanish Group was an honor presented annually at Los Premios 40 Principales. For the 2011 edition this award was merged with the Best Solo category into the Best Artist/Group award.

| Year | Winner | Other nominees |
|---|---|---|
| 2006 | El Canto del Loco | Dover; Estopa; La Oreja de Van Gogh; Pereza |
| 2007 | Pereza | Dover; Hombres G; El Sueño de Morfeo; Efecto Mariposa |
| 2008 | El Canto del Loco | Estopa; Amaral; La Oreja de Van Gogh; Nena Daconte |
| 2009 | Pereza | Nena Daconte; El Sueño de Morfeo; Efecto Mariposa; La Quinta Estación |
| 2010 | Maldita Nerea | Despistaos; Dover; Pignoise; Taxi |
