= Los Premios 40 Principales for Best Spanish Festival, Tour or Concert =

Former Spanish music award

Premios 40 Principales for Best Spanish Festival, Tour or Concert
- Awarded for: Best in Spanish and International music
- Country: Spain
- Presented by: Los 40 Principales
- First award: 2006
- Final award: 2019

The Premio 40 Principales for Best Spanish Festival, Tour or Concert (often shortened to Best Tour), is an honor presented annually at Los Premios 40 Principales. Although it is regarded as a Spanish award, international stars such as Maná or U2 have won it. Possibly due to the exceptional circumstances caused by the COVID-19 pandemic, the award was absent from the 2020 ceremony, and eventually replaced with new Best Live Act category in 2021.

Year	Winner	Nominees
2006	El Canto del Loco - Zapatillas 2006 Tour	Celtas Cortos – Retomando Tour 2006; Estopa – Ultrarrumba Tour; La Oreja de Van Gogh – Guapa Tour; Ana Torroja – La fuerza del destino Tour
2007	Maná - Amar es Combatir Tour	Miguel Bosé – Papitour; La Quinta Estación – El Mundo Se Equivoca Tour España 2007; Antonio Orozco – Cadizfornia Tour 2007; Melendi – Tour 2007
2008	El Canto del Loco	Amaral; Coldplay; Madonna; Rock in Rio Madrid 2008
2009	U2 - U2 360° Tour	The Killers - Tour 09; Melendi - Curiosa la Cara de tu Padre Tour; Enrique Bunbury - Helville de Tour; Valladolid Latino 2009
2010	Alejandro Sanz - Paraíso Express Tour	David Bisbal - Sin Mirar Atrás Tour; Miguel Bosé - Cardio Tour; Maldita Nerea - El Secreto de las Tortugas Tour; Pignoise - Año Zero Tour
2011	Maná - Tour Drama y Luz	Maldita Nerea - Gira Fácil; El Pescao - Tour Nada-Lógico; Dani Martín - Gira Pequeño; Melendi - Gira Volvamos a empezar
2012	La Oreja de Van Gogh - Tour 2012	Carlos Jean - Live Experience Tour; Estopa - Estopa: Tour 2.0; Maldita Nerea - Gira Mucho + Fácil; Melendi - Tour 2012
2013	Alejandro Sanz - Gira La música no se toca	Melendi - Gira Lágrimas desordenadas; 40 Hot Mix Road Show; Pablo Alborán - Gira 2013; Dcode Festival 2013
2014	Malú - Tour Sí	David Bisbal - Gira Tú y yo; Dani Martín - Gira Cero 2014; Antonio Orozco - Gira Ozean's Club; One Direction - Where We Are World Tour
2015	Alejandro Sanz - Gira Sirope	Pablo Alborán - Tour Terral; Fito & Fitipaldis - Gira Huyendo conmigo de mí; Maldita Nerea - Gira Mira dentro; Maná - Cama incendiada Tour
2016	Manuel Carrasco - Gira Bailar el viento	Adele - Live 2016; Coldplay - A Head Full of Dreams Tour; Beyoncé - Formation World Tour; U2 - Innocence + Experience Tour
2017	U2 - The Joshua Tree Tour 2017	Bruno Mars - 24K Magic World Tour; Ed Sheeran - ÷ Tour; Leiva - Gira Monstruos; Maluma - Pretty Boy Dirty Boy World Tour
2018	Dani Martín - Gira Grandes éxitos y pequeños desastres	Pablo Alborán - Tour Prometo; Melendi - Ahora Tour; Pablo López - Tour Santa Libertad; Shakira - El Dorado World Tour
2019	Manuel Carrasco - Gira La cruz del mapa	Alejandro Sanz - #LaGira; Vanesa Martín - Gira Todas las mujeres que habitan en mí; Leiva - Tour Nuclear; A Summer Story Festival
