= En qué estrella estará =

Single by Nena Daconte

from the album He perdido los zapatos
- Released: 23 July 2006
- Recorded: 2006
- Genre: Pop, rock
- Length: ??
- Songwriter(s): Mai Meneses
- Producer(s): ??

Nena Daconte singles chronology
"Idiota" (2006)	"En qué estrella estará" (2006)	"Marta" (2006)

"En qué estrella estará" is the second official single from the Spanish band Nena Daconte from their debut Album He perdido los zapatos. It topped the singles charts in Spain. This song is the official track from the Vuelta Ciclista a España 2006.

== Charts ==
Chart (2006)	Peak position
Nielsen Spain SoundScan	1
