= Premios 40 Principales for Best International Song =

Annual Spanish music award

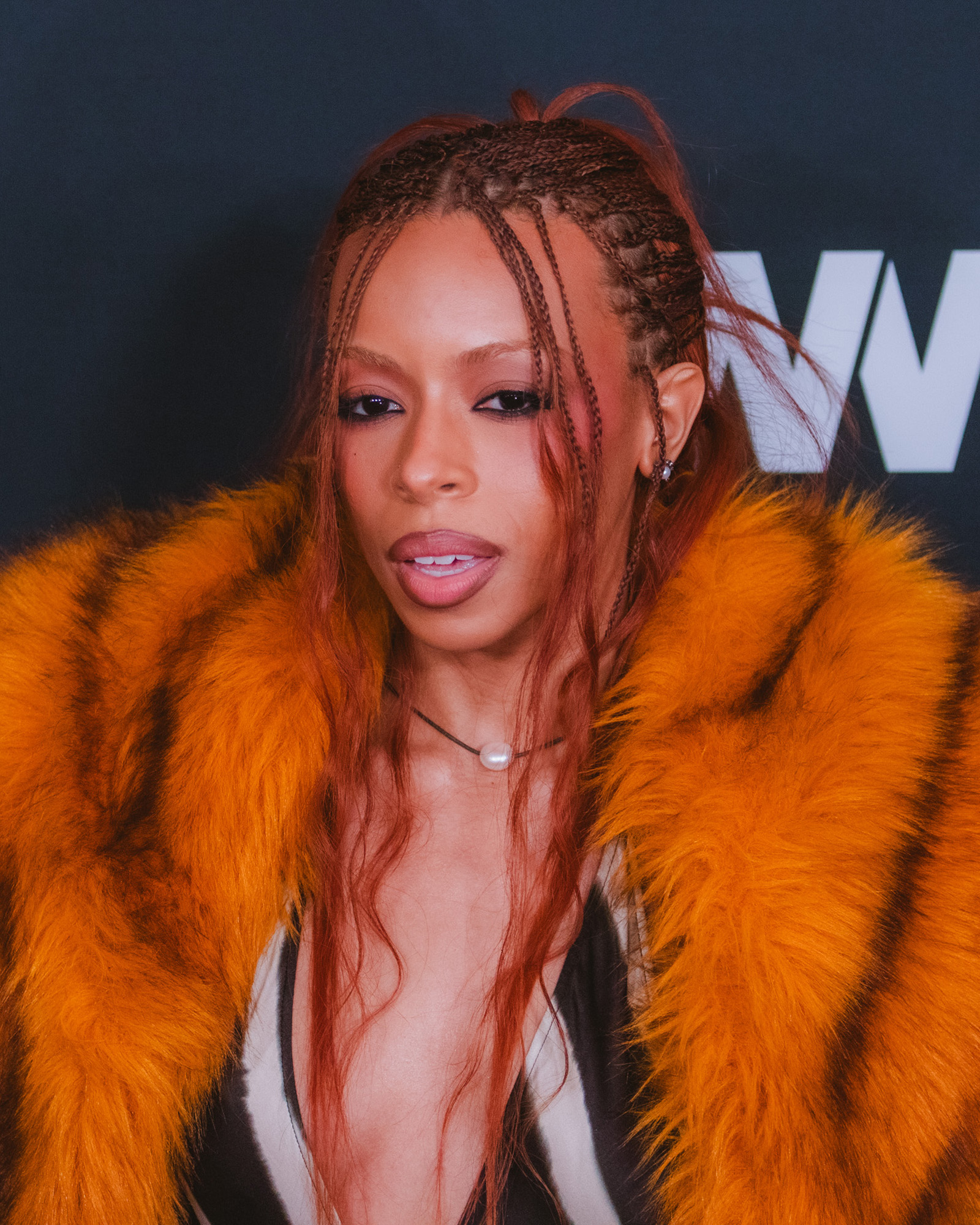
- “ Love Me Not" by Ravyn Lenae is the most recent recipient
- Awarded for: Best in Spanish and International music
- Country: Spain
- Presented by: Los 40 Principales
- First award: 2006
- Currently held by: " Love Me Not" by Ravyn Lenae (2026)

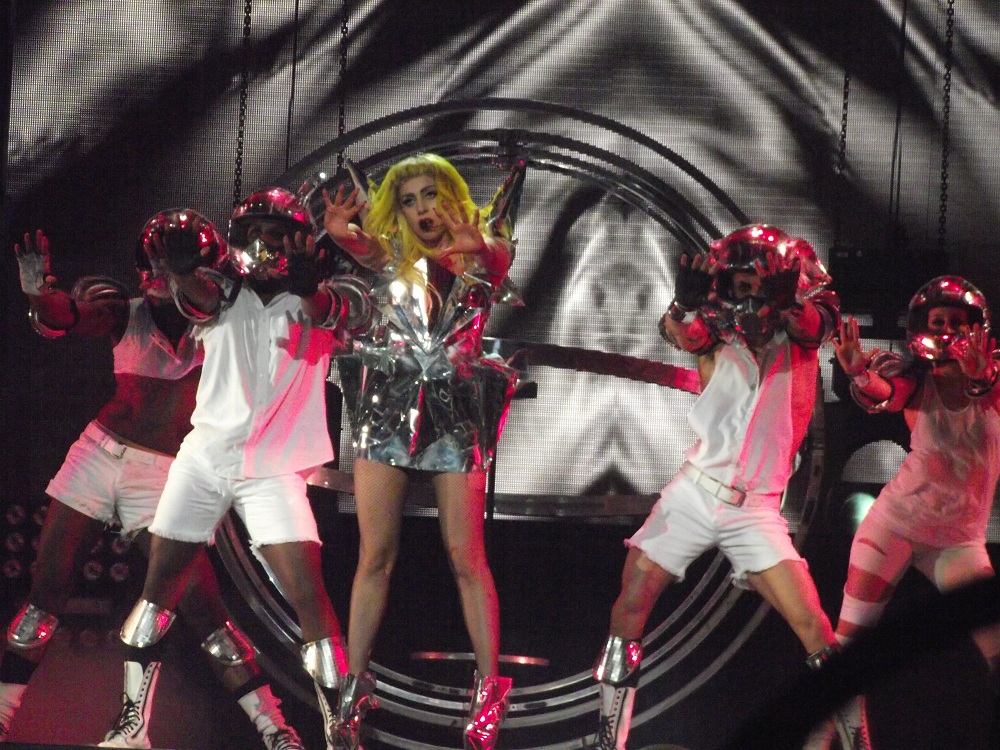
2010 award winner for Bad Romance, Lady Gaga.

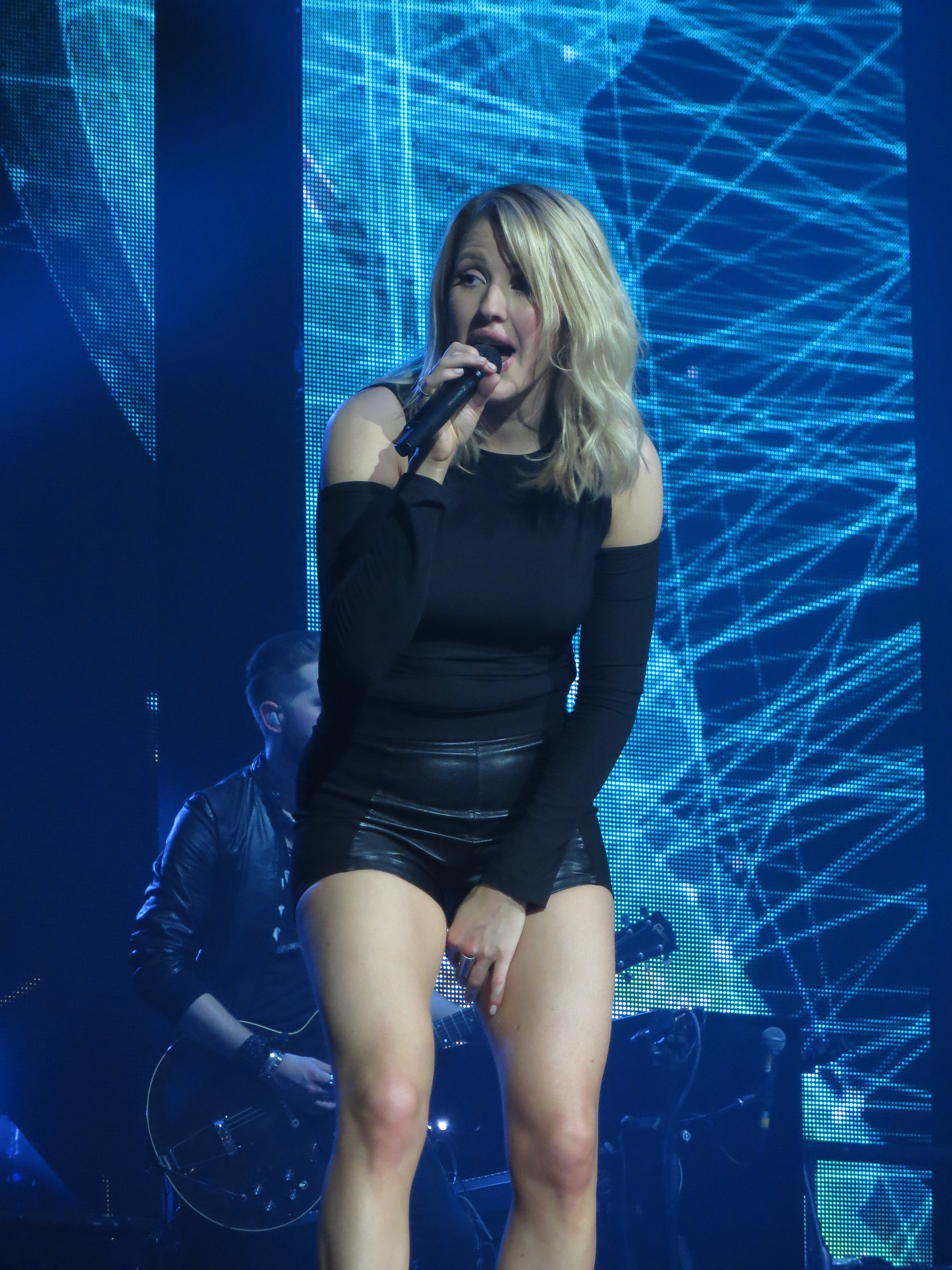
2015 award winner for Love Me Like You Do, Ellie Goulding.

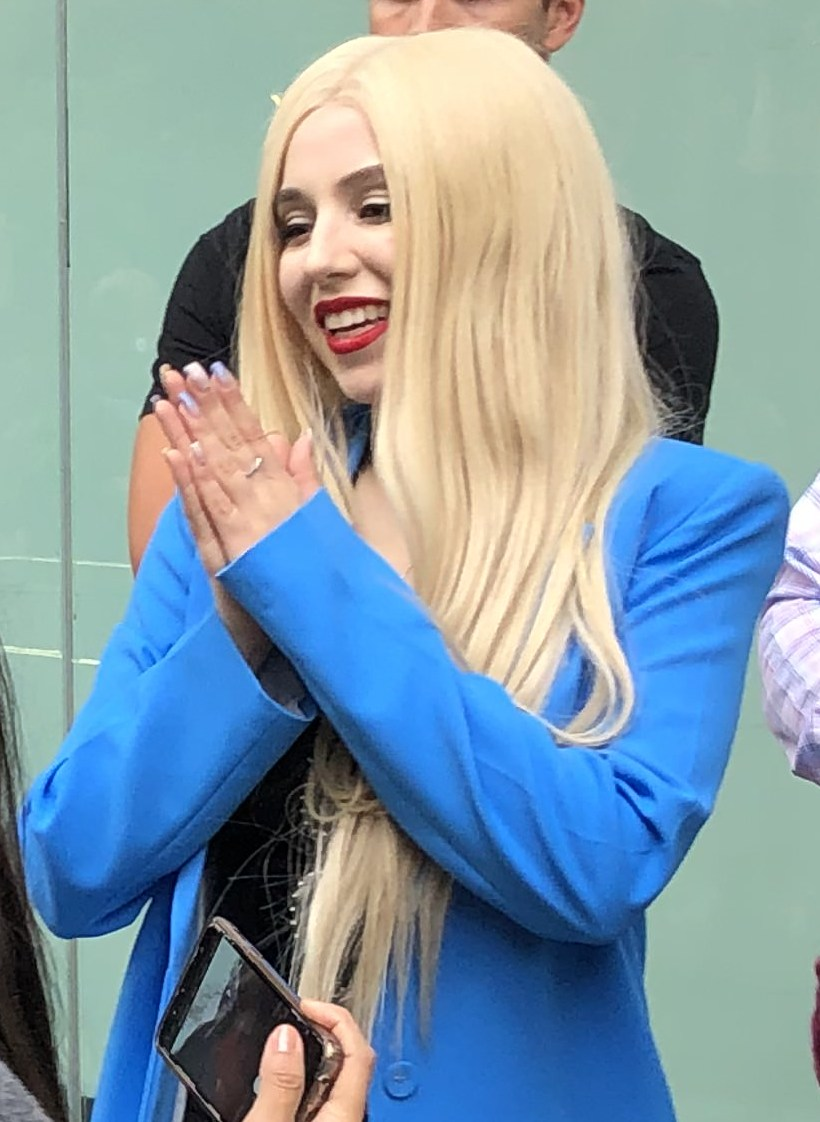
2019 award winner for Sweet but Psycho, Ava Max.

The Premio 40 Principales for Best International Song is an honor presented annually at Los Premios 40 Principales.

Year	Winner	Other nominees
2006	(Colombia) / (Haiti) Shakira & Wyclef Jean — Hips Don't Lie	(United States) Green Day — Wake Me Up When September Ends; (United States) Madonna — Hung Up; (United Kingdom) Lucie Silvas — Nothing Else Matters; (Mexico) Julieta Venegas — Me voy
2007	(Barbados) / (United States) Rihanna & Jay-Z — Umbrella	(United States) The Fray — How to Save a Life; (Canada) Nelly Furtado — All Good Things (Come to an End); (United Kingdom) Snow Patrol — Chasing Cars; (United Kingdom) Mika — Grace Kelly
2008	(United States) OneRepublic — Apologize	(Belgium) Kate Ryan — Ella, elle l'a; (United Kingdom) Duffy — Mercy; (United States) Alicia Keys — No One; (United Kingdom) Amy Winehouse — Rehab
2009	(United States) The Black Eyed Peas — I Gotta Feeling	(United States) Jason Mraz — I'm Yours; (United Kingdom) / (Canada) James Morrison & Nelly Furtado — Broken Strings; (United States) Lady Gaga — Poker Face; (United Kingdom) Alesha Dixon — The Boy Does Nothing
2010	(United States) Lady Gaga — Bad Romance	(France) / (Senegal) David Guetta & Akon — Sexy B**ch; (United States) Kesha — Tik Tok; (Romania) / (Moldova) Edward Maya & Vika Jigulina — Stereo Love; (United Kingdom) Taio Cruz — Break Your Heart
2011	(United States) LMFAO — Party Rock Anthem	(United States) Jennifer Lopez & Pitbull — On the Floor; (United States) / (Netherlands) Pitbull, Ne-Yo, Afrojack & Nayer — Give Me Everything; (Barbados) Rihanna — S&M; (Romania) Alexandra Stan — Mr. Saxobeat
2012	(United Kingdom) Adele — Someone Like You	(Sweden) Loreen — Euphoria; (Canada) Carly Rae Jepsen — Call Me Maybe; (United States) Maroon 5 & Christina Aguilera — Moves Like Jagger; (Australia) / (New Zealand) Gotye & Kimbra — Somebody That I Used to Know
2013	(United Kingdom) James Arthur — Impossible	(United States) Bruno Mars — Locked Out of Heaven; (Sweden) Avicii — Wake Me Up; (France) / (United States) Daft Punk, Pharrell Williams & Nile Rodgers — Get Lucky; (United States) Robin Thicke, Pharrell Williams & T.I. — Blurred Lines
2014	(United States) Jason Derülo — Talk Dirty	(United States) Pharrell Williams — Happy; (United States) Miley Cyrus — Wrecking Ball; (Sweden) Avicii — Hey Brother; (United States) OneRepublic — Counting Stars
2015	(United Kingdom) Ellie Goulding — Love Me Like You Do	(United Kingdom) Ed Sheeran — Thinking Out Loud; (Australia) Sia — Chandelier; (United Kingdom) / (United States) Mark Ronson ft. Bruno Mars — Uptown Funk; (United Kingdom) Sam Smith — Stay with Me
2016	(Australia) / (Jamaica) Sia feat. Sean Paul — Cheap Thrills	(Canada) Justin Bieber — Sorry; (United Kingdom) Adele — Hello; (United States) Jennifer Lopez — Ain't Your Mama; (Canada) / (Nigeria) / (United Kingdom) Drake feat. Wizkid & Kyla — One Dance
2017	(Puerto Rico) Luis Fonsi feat. Daddy Yankee — Despacito	(United Kingdom) Ed Sheeran — Shape of You; (United Kingdom) / (Jamaica) Clean Bandit feat. Sean Paul & Anne-Marie — Rockabye; (United Kingdom) Rag'n'Bone Man — Human; (United States) / (United Kingdom) The Chainsmokers & Coldplay — Something Just like This
2018	(United Kingdom) Dua Lipa — New Rules	(United Kingdom) / (United States) Ed Sheeran & Beyoncé — Perfect; (United Kingdom) Calvin Harris & Dua Lipa — One Kiss; (United Kingdom) / (Australia) Zayn feat. Sia — Dusk Till Dawn; (United States) Camila Cabello — Havana
2019	(United States) Ava Max — Sweet but Psycho	(Canada) / (United States) Shawn Mendes & Camila Cabello — Señorita; (United States) Panic! at the Disco — High Hopes; (United States) Jonas Brothers — Sucker; (United Kingdom) / (Canada) Ed Sheeran & Justin Bieber — I Don't Care
2020	(Australia) Tones and I — Dance Monkey	(United States) / (Colombia) Black Eyed Peas & J Balvin — Ritmo; (Canada) The Weeknd — Blinding Lights; (United Kingdom) Lewis Capaldi — Before You Go; (United Kingdom) Dua Lipa — Don't Start Now
2021	(United Kingdom) Ed Sheeran — Bad Habits	(South Korea) BTS — Dynamite; (United States) Olivia Rodrigo — Drivers License; (Australia) The Kid Laroi — Without You; (United States) Lil Nas X — Montero (Call Me by Your Name)
2022	(United States) Imagine Dragons — Enemy	(United Kingdom) Adele — Easy on Me; (United States) / (Colombia) / (France) Black Eyed Peas, Shakira & David Guetta — Don't You Worry; (United States) / (United Kingdom) Camila Cabello & Ed Sheeran — Bam Bam; (United Kingdom) Harry Styles — As It Was; (United States) Lizzo — About Damn Time
2023	(United Kingdom) Dua Lipa — Dance the Night	(Nigeria) Rema — Calm Down; (United States) Miley Cyrus — Flowers; (United Kingdom) Calvin Harris & Ellie Goulding — Miracle; (Sweden) Loreen — Tattoo; (United Kingdom) / (Germany) Sam Smith & Kim Petras — Unholy
2024	(United States) Benson Boone — Beautiful Things	(United States) Beyoncé — Texas Hold 'Em; (United Kingdom) Coldplay — feelslikeimfallinginlove; (United Kingdom) Dua Lipa — Houdini; (United States) Sabrina Carpenter — Espresso; (United States) Teddy Swims — Lose Control
2025	(United Kingdom) Myles Smith — Stargazing	(United Kingdom) Ed Sheeran — Azizam; (United States) Teddy Swims — The Door; (United States) Gracie Abrams — That's So True; (United States) Alex Warren — Ordinary; (Italy) Damiano David — Born with a Broken Heart
2026	(United States) Ravyn Lenae — Love Me Not	(United Kingdom) Olivia Dean — Man I Need; (United States) Taylor Swift — The Fate of Ophelia; (Australia) / (South Korea) Tame Impala & Jennie — Dracula; (Slovakia) Adéla — Ain't in LA; (United States) Djo — End of Beginning
