= Los Premios 40 Principales for Best Spanish Solo Act =

Former Spanish music award

Premios 40 Principales for Best Spanish Solo Act
- Awarded for: Best in Spanish and International music
- Country: Spain
- Presented by: Los 40 Principales
- First award: 2006
- Final award: 2010
- Website: www.premios40principales.es

The Premio 40 Principales for Best Spanish Solo Act was an honor presented annually at Los Premios 40 Principales. For the 2011 edition this award was merged with the Best Group category into the Best Artist/Group award.

Year	Winner	Other nominees
2006	David Bisbal	David DeMaría; Chenoa; Fito & Fitipaldis; Ana Torroja
2007	Melendi	Miguel Bosé; Antonio Carmona; Antonio Orozco; Alejandro Sanz
2008	Melendi	Manuel Carrasco; Rosario; Manolo García; Miguel Bosé
2009	Fito & Fitipaldis	Macaco; Amaia Montero; Carlos Baute; Antonio Orozco
2010	Dani Martín	Melendi; Alejandro Sanz; El Pescao; Enrique Iglesias
