= Los Premios 40 Principales for Best Spanish Artist/Group =

Annual Spanish music award

Premios 40 Principales for Best Spanish Artist/Group
- Awarded for: Best in Spanish and International music
- Country: Spain
- Presented by: Los 40 Principales
- First award: 2011
- Currently held by: Quevedo (2026)

The Premios 40 Principales for Best Spanish Artist or Group is an honor presented annually at Los Premios 40 Principales. It appeared first on the 2011 edition as a result of the merging of the Best Solo and Best Group categories from the previous editions.

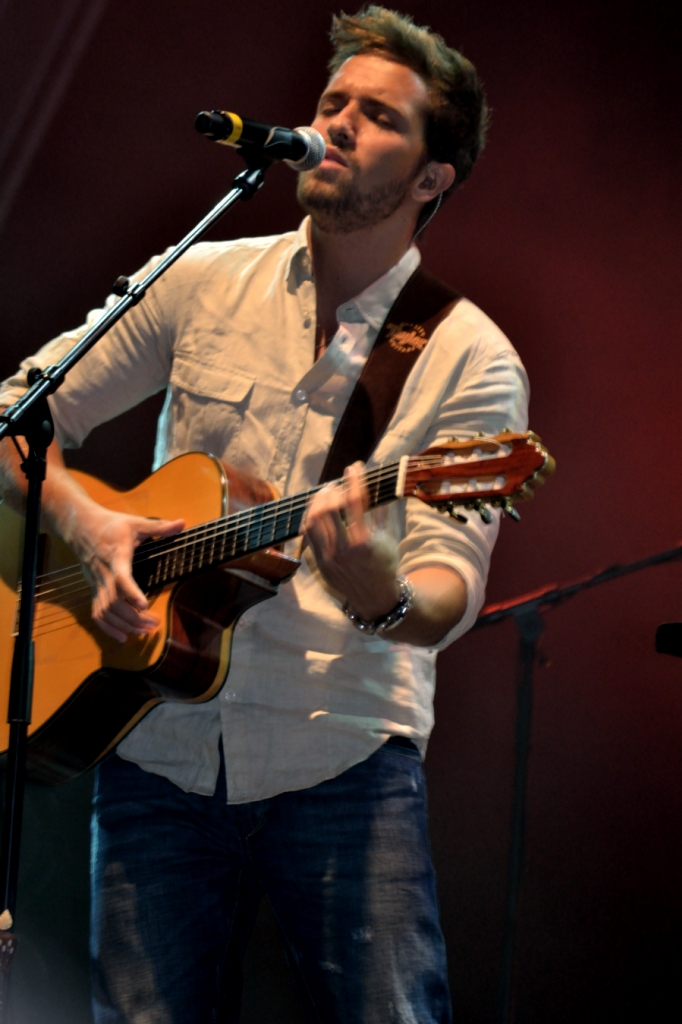
Four-time winner Pablo Alborán.

Year	Winner	Other nominees
2011	La Oreja de Van Gogh	Enrique Iglesias; Dani Martín; El Pescao; Maldita Nerea
2012	Pablo Alborán	Alejandro Sanz; Estopa; Macaco; Melendi
2013	Pablo Alborán	Melendi; Auryn; Dani Martín; Malú
2014	Malú	Leiva; Antonio Orozco; David Bisbal; Enrique Iglesias
2015	Pablo Alborán	Melendi; Fito & Fitipaldis; Alejandro Sanz; Enrique Iglesias
2016	Leiva	Manuel Carrasco; Enrique Iglesias; Fangoria; Dani Martín
2017	Vanesa Martín	David Bisbal; Dani Martín; Leiva; Manuel Carrasco
2018	Pablo Alborán	Dani Martín; Melendi; Pablo López; Álvaro Soler
2019	Rosalía	Leiva; Aitana; Manuel Carrasco; David Bisbal
2020	Aitana	David Otero; David Bisbal; Pablo Alborán; Dani Martín
2021	C. Tangana	Ana Mena; Pablo Alborán; Vanesa Martín; Lola Índigo
2022	Dani Fernández	Aitana; Ana Mena; Lola Índigo; Manuel Carrasco; Rosalía
2023	Ana Mena	Álvaro de Luna; Aitana; Lola Índigo; David Bisbal; Quevedo
2024	Lola Índigo	Abraham Mateo; Aitana; Ana Mena; Dani Fernández; Enrique Iglesias
2025	Aitana	Dani Fernández; Abraham Mateo; Dani Martín; Pablo Alborán; Leiva
