= Tenía tanto que darte =

2008 song by Nena Daconte

Single by Nena Daconte

from the album Retales de carnaval
- Language: Spanish
- Released: September 13, 2008
- Recorded: 2007
- Genre: pop rock
- Length: 3:25 (single version); 3:39 (album version)
- Label: Universal Music Spain
- Songwriter(s): Kim Fanlo • Mai Monesses
- Producer(s): Kim Fanlo

Nena Daconte singles chronology
"Marta" (2007)	"Tenía tanto que darte" (2008)	"El Aleph" (2008)

«Tenía tanto que darte» (I Had so much to give you) is a single by Spanish band Nena Daconte, released in September 13, 2008 through Universal Music España as the lead single for their second studio album Retales de carnaval (2008).

«Tenía tanto que darte» become an instant hit in Spain. It debuted at its peak position of 2 just behind the worldwide success «Colgando en tus manos» by David Bustamante and Marta Sánchez. It stayed at the second spot of the PROMUSICAE Top 50 Songs for four weeks before it started to fall down the charts. the song spent a total of 25 weeks on the chart and became the duo’s second top 10 after «En qué estrella estará» in 2006. On the airplay charts, «Tenía tanto que darte» d more impactful. It reached number one in Los40 charts for two weeks.

== Composition and background ==
The song was written by Nena Daconte singer Mai Menesses. During an interview the singer had in a program radio in Cadena Ser, she affirmed all the songs from their second studio album was written in a really short amount of time and «Tenía tanto quedarte» wasn’t an exception affirming that she wrote in five minutes.

” Es una canción que escribí en cinco minutos, me salió del tirón”
”[Tenía tanto que darte] is a song I wrote in five minutes and finished in the first try”

— Nenca Daconte for -Cadena SER

During the time of the song release, rumors started to spread affirming the single was written about a miscarriage Menesses had. Rumors which she denied and said the song was about “It’s about taking the decision to keep all those good memories of a past [love] relationship”.
