= Personas (album) =

Studio album by El Canto del Loco
- Released: April 1, 2008
- Recorded: October 2007 – February 2008
- Genre: Rock, pop punk, alternative rock
- Length: 49:01
- Label: Sony BMG
- Producer: Nigel Walker

El Canto del Loco chronology
Arriba El Telón (Las Mejores Rarezas)	Personas

Singles from Personas
- 1. "Eres Tonto"

Personas is the fifth studio album by El Canto del Loco, released on April 1, 2008, in Spain. As for the last three albums, Personas was produced by Nigel Walker, who recorded it in Madrid, from October 2007 to February 2008. The first single from this album is ¡Eres tonto!, for which El Canto Del Loco produced three videos. The album sold more than 175,000 copies and went Platinum in the first week of release.

== Track listing ==
1. "Corazón" (Heart) – 4:17
2. "Acabado En A" (Over at A) – 2:23
3. "Eres Tonto" (You're Stupid) – 3:14
4. "Peter Pan" – 4:20
5. "La Vida" (The Life) – 3:24
6. "Personas" (People)– 3:44
7. "Fin De Semana" (Weekend) – 3:24
8. "Eh, Tú" (Hey, You) – 2:58
9. "Todo Lo Hago Mal" (I Do Everything Wrong) – 4:17
10. "La Suerte De Mi Vida" (The Luck of My Life)– 3:39
11. "Un Millón De Cicatrices" (A Million of Scars) – 4:23
12. "Gigante" (Giant) – 4:29
13. "Gracias" (Thank You) – 4:46

== Charts ==
The album Personas by El Canto Del Loco went to number one in the Spanish albums chart.

Chart	Peak position	Certification	Sales
Spanish Albums Chart	1	3× Platinum	203,900+
World Albums Top 40	17		
