= Marta (Nena Daconte song) =

"Marta" is the third official single from Nena Daconte's debut album He Perdido Los Zapatos. It was written by Joaquin Fanlo Gonzalez and Mai Meneses. It charted No.16 in Nielsen ratings in 2005. The band made two videos. The first is with a borrowed white Golf GTI convertible. When they obtained better funding from Universal, they refilmed the video with a red Ford Mustang.

== Charts ==
Chart (2007)	Peak position
Cadena 100	6
Los 40	20
Nielsen	16
