= Idiota (Nena Daconte song) =

Single by Nena Daconte

from the album He Perdido Los Zapatos
- Released: 2006
- Recorded: 2006
- Genre: Pop, Rock
- Length: ??
- Songwriter(s): Mai Meneses
- Producer(s): ??

Nena Daconte singles chronology
"Idiota" (2006)	"En Qué Estrella Estará" (2006)

"Idiota" is the first official single from Spanish band Nena Daconte from their debut Album He Perdido Los Zapatos. It charted at 11 in 2006.

== Charts ==
Chart	Peak Position
Cadena 100 (Spain)	11
Los 40 principales (Spain)	25
