= Los Premios 40 Principales 2008 =

Spanish music awards ceremony

- Date: December 12, 2008
- Venue: Palacio de Deportes de la Comunidad de Madrid
- Host: Sira Fernández, Frank Blanco and Tony Aguilar
- Network: Cuatro (Spain); A&E Network (Latin America)

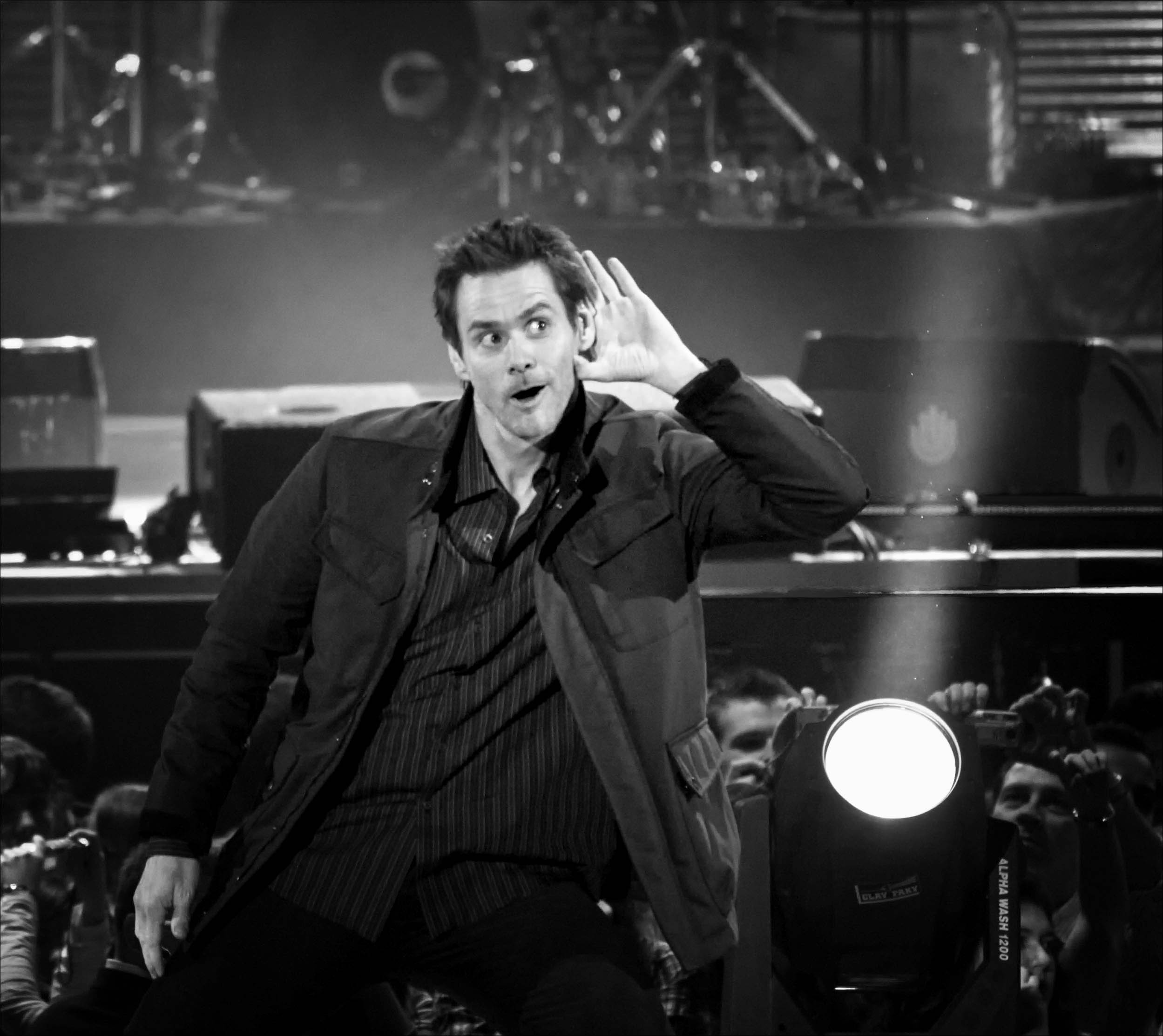
Actor Jim Carrey attended the show to accept an award for his contribution to music through films.

== Awards ==
=== Best Song ===
- El Canto del Loco — "Eres Tonto"
- Miguel Bosé (featuring Bimba Bosé) — "Como Un Lobo"
- Amaral — "Kamikaze"
- Chambao — "Papeles Mojados"
- Pereza — "Estrella Polar"

=== Best Video ===
- El Canto del Loco — "Eres Tonto"
- Nena Daconte — "Tenía Tanto Que Darte"
- Beatriz Luengo — "Pretendo Hablarte"
- Amaral — "Kamikaze"
- Pignoise — "Súbete A Mi Cohete"

=== Best Album ===
- El Canto del Loco — Personas
- Estopa — Allenrock
- Amaral — Gato Negro Dragón Rojo
- La Oreja de Van Gogh — A las cinco en el Astoria
- Rosario — Parte de Mi

=== Best Solo ===
- Manuel Carrasco
- Melendi
- Rosario
- Manolo García
- Miguel Bosé

=== Best Group ===
- El Canto del Loco
- Estopa
- Amaral
- La Oreja de Van Gogh
- Nena Daconte

=== Best New Act ===
- Despistaos
- Beatriz Luengo
- The Cabriolets
- Najwajean
- No Way Out

=== Best Tour ===
- El Canto del Loco
- Amaral
- Coldplay
- Madonna
- Rock in Rio

=== Best Argentine Act ===
- Andrés Calamaro
- Babasónicos
- Axel
- Gustavo Cerati
- Miranda!

=== Best Chilean Act ===
- Kudai
- Denise Rosenthal
- Shamanes
- De Saloon
- Nicole Natalino

=== Best Colombian Act ===
- Cabas
- Los de Adentro
- Fonseca
- Tinto
- Katamarán

=== Best Costa Rican Act ===
- Por Partes
- Akasha
- El Parque
- Evolución
- Percance

=== Best Ecuadorian Act ===
- Fausto Miño
- Daniel Betancourth
- Chaucha
- Papá Changó
- Rockvox

=== Best Guatemalan Act ===
- El Tambor de la Tribu
- Viento en contra
- Sabrina
- Sofía
- Tavo Bárcenas

=== Best Mexican Act ===
- Belanova
- Maná
- Julieta Venegas
- Café Tacuba
- Ximena Sariñana

=== Best Panamanian Act ===
- Flex
- Os Almirantes
- Sr. Loop
- El Roockie
- Eddy Lover (featuring La Factoría)

=== Best Latin Song ===
- Eros Ramazzotti and Ricky Martin — "No Estamos Solos"
- Juanes — "Gotas de Agua Dulce"
- Maná — "Si No Te Hubieras Ido"
- Belinda — "Bella Traición"
- Julieta Venegas — "El Presente"

=== Best Latin Act ===
- Julieta Venegas
- Maná
- Juanes
- Ricky Martin
- Belinda

=== Best International Song ===
- Kate Ryan — "Ella, elle l'a"
- Duffy — "Mercy"
- Alicia Keys — "No One"
- OneRepublic — "Apologize"
- Amy Winehouse — "Rehab"

=== Best International Act ===
- Amy Winehouse
- Duffy
- Coldplay
- Alicia Keys
- Madonna

=== Special awards ===
- For his contribution to music through films: Jim Carrey
- Career achievement award: Beyoncé

== Live performances ==
=== Main show ===
- Kate Ryan — "Ella, elle l'a"
- Estopa — "Cuando Amanece"
- The Cabriolets — "Poco A Poco"
- Take That — "Greatest Day"
- Rosario — "No Dudaría"
- Beatriz Luengo — "Pretendo hablarte"
- Keane — "The Lovers Are Losing"
- Beyoncé — "If I Were a Boy"
- Nena Daconte — "Tenía Tanto que Darte"
- Craig David (featuring Álex Ubago) — "Walking Away"
- El Canto del Loco (featuring Calle 13 and Mayumaná) — "Eres Tonto / No Hay Nadie Como Tú"

=== Concerts ===
- La Oreja de Van Gogh
- James Blunt
- Anastacia
