= Mai Meneses =

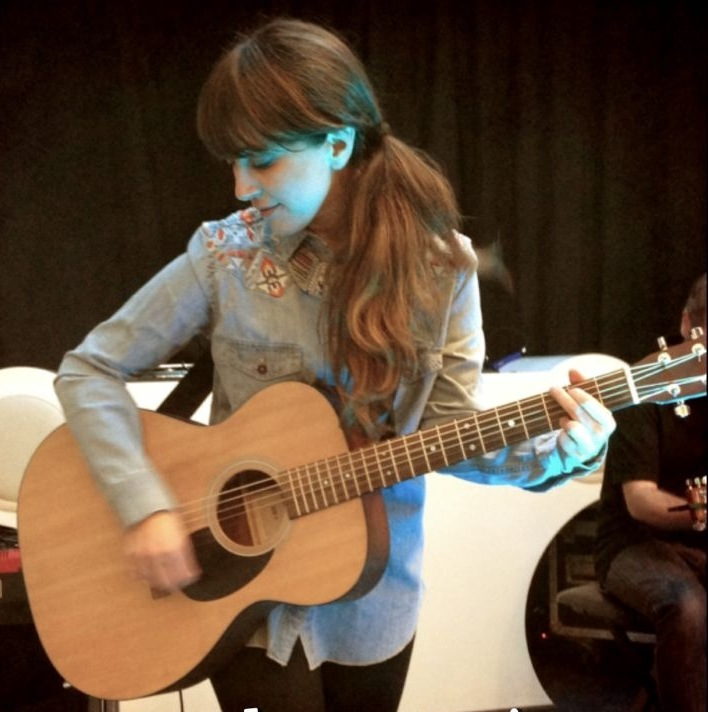
- Mai Meneses (2013)

Background information
- Born: Maria Isabel González-Meneses García-Valdecasas; 4 January 1978 (age 47); Madrid, Spain
- Genres: Pop
- Occupations: Singer & songwriter
- Instruments: Vocals, guitar, piano
- Years active: 2002–present
- Labels: Universal Music Spain
- Website: Nena Daconte

María Isabel González-Meneses García-Valdecasas (Spanish: [maˈɾi.ajsaˈβel ɣonˈθaleθ meˈneses ɣaɾˈθi.a βaldeˈkasas]; (Note: In isolation, González is pronounced [ɡonˈθaleθ] and García-Valdecasas is pronounced [ɡaɾˈθi.a βaldeˈkasas].) born 4 January 1978), known mononymously as Mai Meneses (Spanish: [ˈmaj meˈneses]), is a Spanish singer and songwriter. She also leads the Spanish pop band Nena Daconte.

== Life and career ==
=== Early life and career beginnings ===
Born in Madrid, Mai is the youngest of six siblings. Due to her parents' itinerant work, she grew up in Zaragoza and Jaen. Mai later settled in Madrid to attend college, where she received a JD degree (law) from Universidad San Pablo CEU (Madrid) in 2000.

She first rose to fame as a contestant of the second season of Operación Triunfo (Spanish TV singing contest). After her participation, she released her first single, titled "Vuelve".

In 2005, Mai Meneses formed the band Nena Daconte in Barcelona along with musician Kim Fanlo. In 2010, Fanlo left the formation and Mai Meneses continues as the lead singer and songwriter of Nena Daconte.

=== He perdido los zapatos (2006) ===
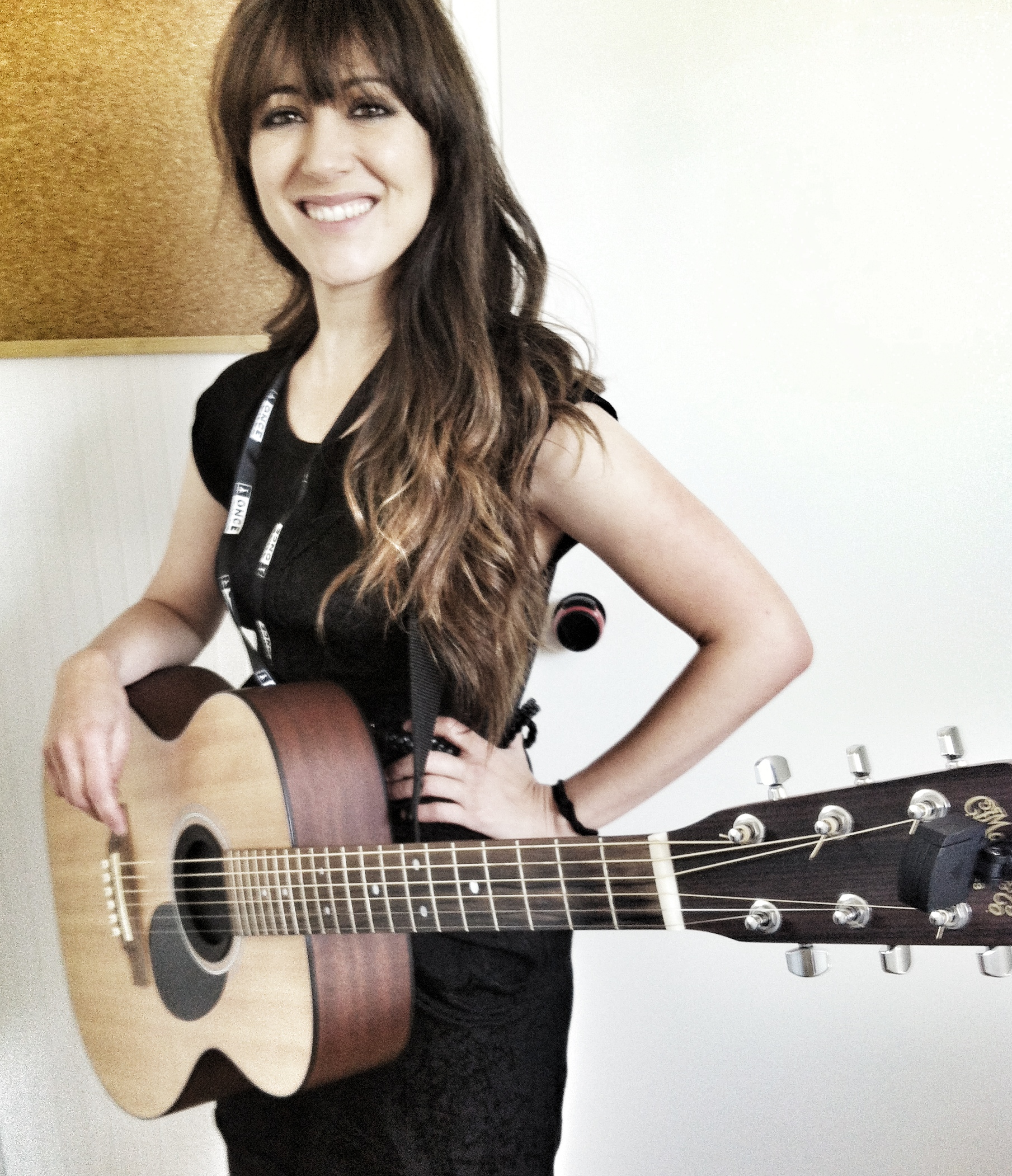
Mai Meneses backstage before a concert in Madrid (2013)

In 2006, Mai, acting as the lead singer and songwriter of Nena Daconte, released its debut album titled He Perdido Los Zapatos (I Have Lost My Shoes) under their own label, Daconte Music. The following year, she signed a record deal with Universal Music Spain and the album was re-released with a new bonus track (a remix of the song Idiota).

Idiota (Idiot) was the first single of the record. Later editions of the album included a new version of Idiota produced by Carlos Jean and mastered in New York City. Idiota reached number 25 of the Spanish billboard charts.

The second single was En que estrella estará (In What Star Will It Be). The song was selected to be the official theme for the Vuelta Ciclista a España (Spanish Cycling Tour) of 2006. En que estrella estará reached the number 1 position on the Spanish billboard charts for 5 weeks.

Nena Daconte´s debut album went Gold in Spain. Later in that same year, Nena Daconte was nominated for an MTV Europe Music Awards. He Perdido Los Zapatos became the 3rd best selling album in Spain in 2006 and En que estrella estará also became, that same year, the most downloaded song in Spain.

=== Retales de carnaval (2008) ===
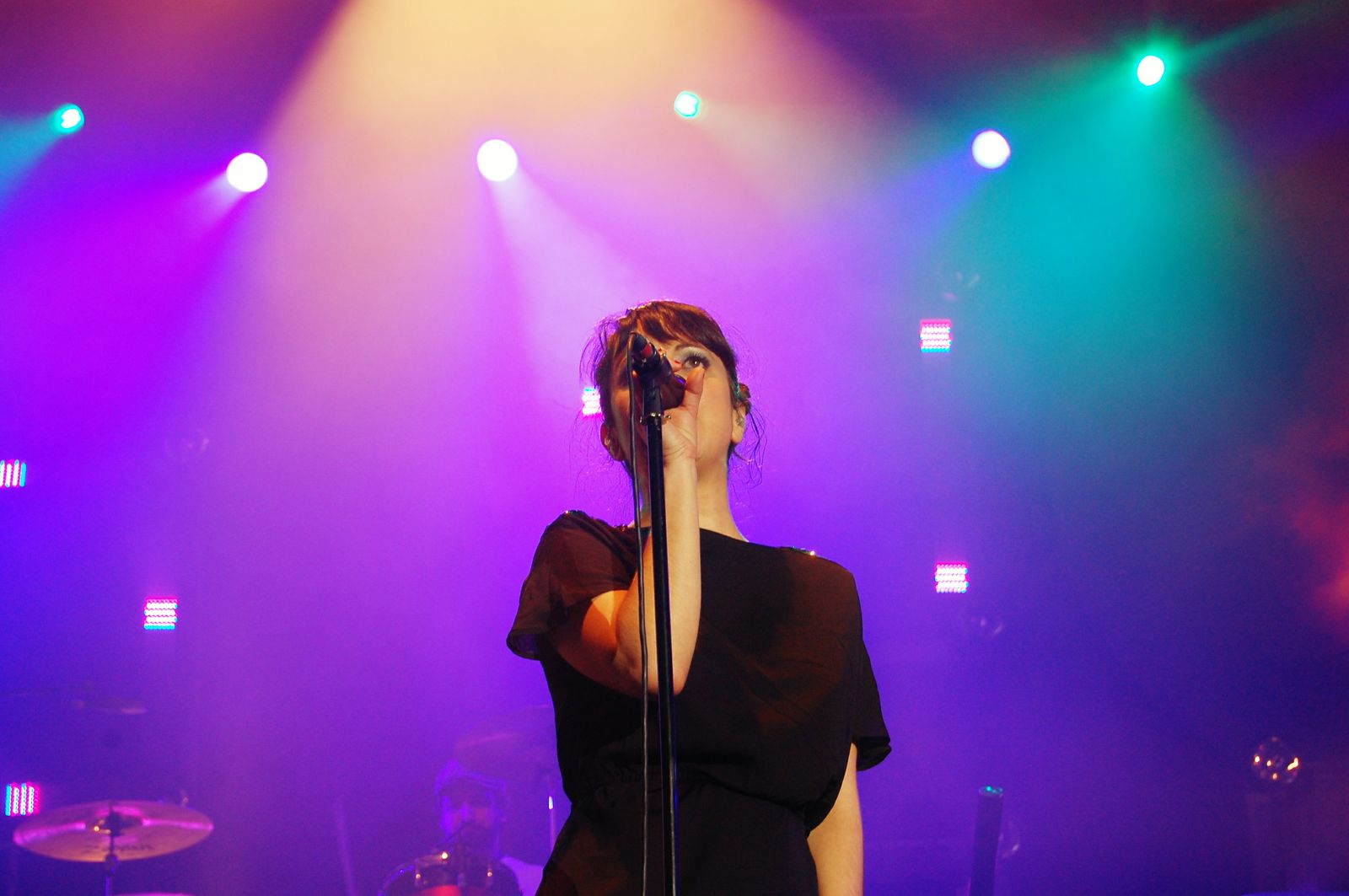
Retales de Carnaval tour concert

Their second album, titled "Retales De Carnaval" (Carnival Leftovers), was released two years later, on 30 September 2008. The first single, Tenia Tanto que Darte (I Had a Lot To Give You), premiered on 23 August 2008. As with the first record, this second album was entirely composed by Mai.

In November 2008, Tenia tanto que darte reached the No.1 position on the Spanish billboard chart (40 Principales), clinching it for two consecutive weeks. The song´s music video has over 5 million views on YouTube

Tenia tanto que darte became Spain's Best Selling song of 2008 on iTunes. Likewise, record sales made the album become Platinum in September 2009.

=== Una mosca en el cristal (2010) ===
In 2010, Nena Daconte released its third album titled Una mosca en el cristal (A Fly in the Window), produced by Alejo Stivel. The single No te invite a dormir (I Didn´t Invite You Over) reached number 17 on the Spanish billboard charts (40 Principales).

In February 2011, Perdida (Lost) was released as the second single. On that same year, Nena Daconte started an acoustic tour throughout Spain under the name Nena Daconte Club.

Likewise, in late 2011, Mai Meneses participated on a tribute album for Antonio Vega, giving voice to the song Tesoros along with composer LA (native singer from Mallorca).

In 2012, Mai took a role in the single Pero si tu no estás, which was the main theme and soundtrack of "La Fuga", a Spanish TV series.

=== Solo muerdo por ti (2013) ===
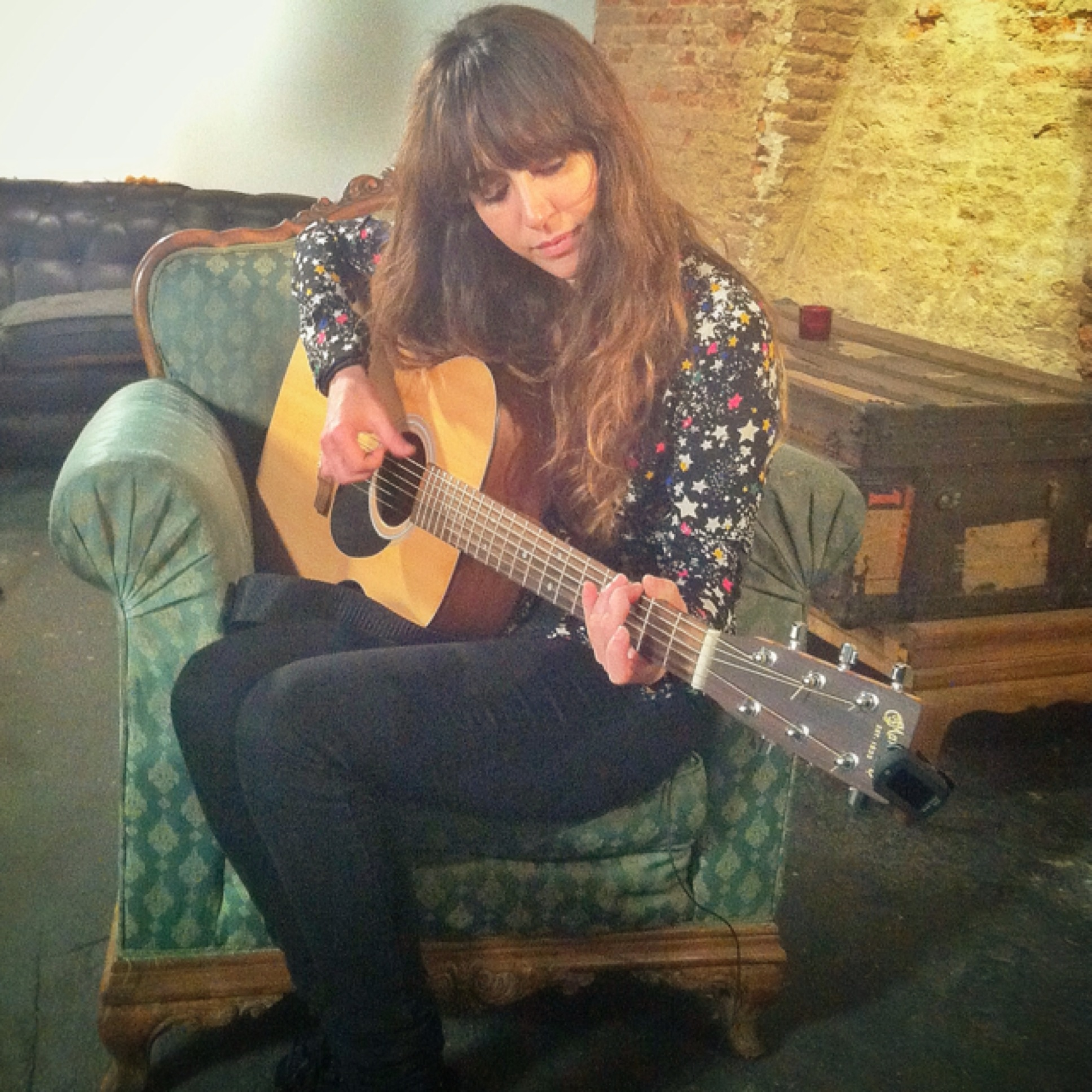
Nena Daconte with her acoustic guitar (Madrid 2013)

On 30 April 2013, Nena Daconte released their fourth studio álbum titled "Solo muerdo por ti" in Spain. It was recorded in Madrid at estudios Sonobox and produced by Manuel Colmenero and Jabibu Carretero (also produced of Spanish groups Vetusta Morla, Eladio y los seres queridos).

The album contains 13 new tracks (plus two more tracks in their digital edition), all composed by Mai Meneses. The album takes its title from the nursery rhyme that Mai composed for her son (track number 13). On the same day of its debut, Solo muerdo por ti became number 1 in sales in iTunes Spain.

According to Mai Meneses, “I feel that this album is more mature and I have meditated each phrase for almost two years… there is nothing left to chance, everything is measured: every lyric, step, there is lots of work.”

As per the critics, the album is "clear and direct". As for its sound, it is as genuine as the origins of Nena Daconte. The first single is titled "Dispare" and its on-air debut was on 5 March 2013. The music video was recorded at the abandoned factory of Pegaso, at the outskirts of Madrid and produced by Zoo and SevenSenses.

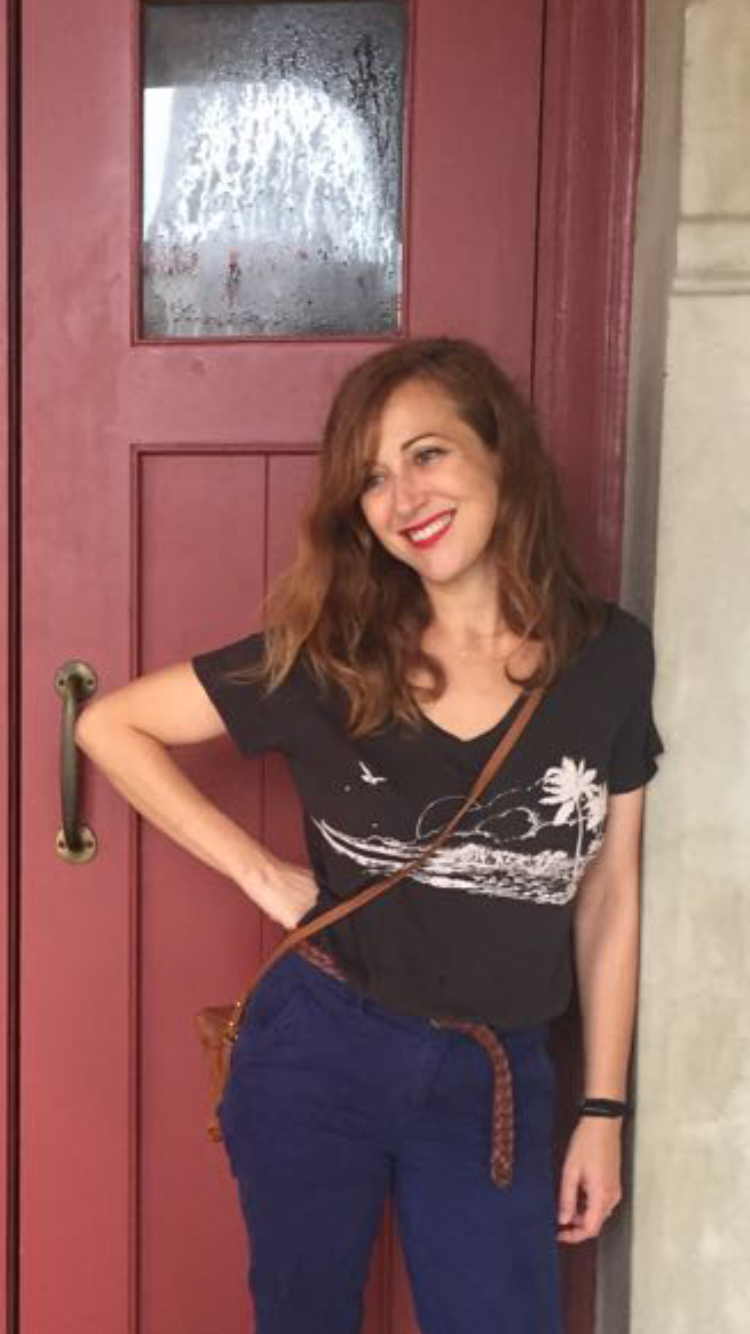
Nena Daconte in Dallas, Texas. 2018

=== Suerte ... (2019) ===
After living for some years in Dallas, Texas with her family, seeking rest and inspiration, she resumed her musical production. In March 2019, the band´s fifth studio album, titled “Suerte”, was released, produced by well-known Spanish pop producer, Paco Salazar, in Madrid, Spain. The album has 7 songs.

== Singles ==
Singles
Year	Song	Spanish Billboard Chart Position (40 Principales)
2005	Idiota	Number 25
2006	En que estrella estará	Number 1
2007	Marta	Number 20
2008	Tenía tanto que darte	Number 1
2009	El Aleph	Number 5
2009	Ay! amor	Number 18
2009	Perdóname (with singer Coti)	Number 20
2010	No te invité a dormir	Number 17
2010	Perdida	Number 30
2011	Son niños	
2011	El halcón que vive en mi cabeza	
2011	Pero si tú no estás	Soundtrack of Spanish TV series La fuga
