= David DeMaría =

Spanish singer-songwriter (born 1976)

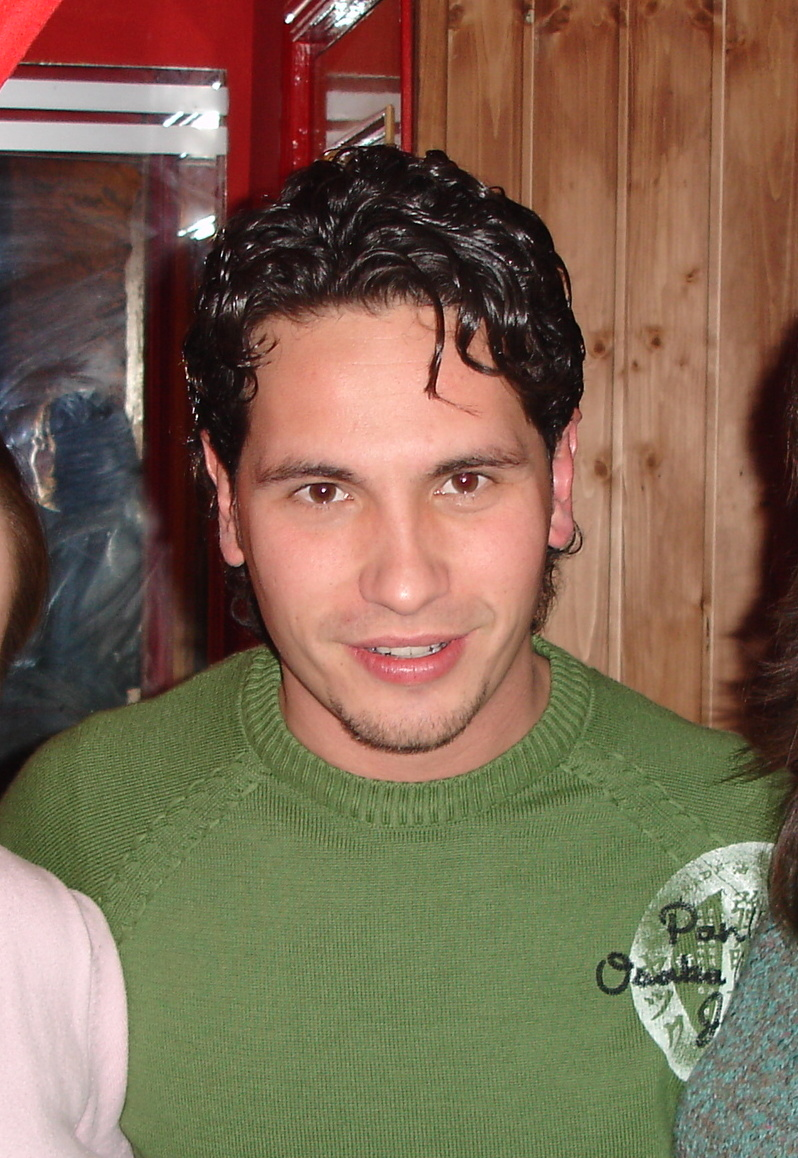

Background information
- Born: David Jiménez Pinteño; 20 January 1976 (age 50); Jerez de la Frontera, Cádiz Province, Spain
- Genres: Pop, Flamenco
- Occupations: Singer, songwriter
- Instruments: Vocals, guitar
- Years active: 1990–present
- Website: www.daviddemariaofficial.es

David Jiménez Pinteño known as David DeMaría (born 20 January 1976) is a Spanish singer and songwriter. David was born in Jerez de la Frontera in Cádiz Province.

His career started when he was 14 years old with the Spanish group Kelliam 71. He was with them for 6 years. His first solo album came when he was 19 years old. The self-titled album was followed with Soñar Despierto {Dreaming Awake} in 1997, El Color del Destino {The Color of Destiny} in 2001, Sin Miedo a Perder {Without Fear of Losing} in 2003, and Barcos de Papel {Paper Boats} in 2004. In 2005 an international album simply titled David DeMaria was released which contained some of his more popular hits from his previous albums.

== Discography ==
=== Albums ===
- 1997 David DeMaria — (SP)
- 1997 Soñar Despierto — No. 87 (SP)
- 2001 El Color Del Destino — No. 54 (SP)
- 2003 Sin Miedo A Perder — No. 1 (SP)
- 2004 Barcos De Papel — No. 1 (SP)
- 2005 En Concierto: Gira Barcos De Papel — #1 (SP)
- 2005 David DeMaria (international release)
- 2006 Caminos De Ida y Vuelta — #3 (SP) (Gold: 40,000 units)
- 2007 La fuerza de la voluntad: Grandes Éxitos — (CD recopilatorio + 3 temas inéditos)
- 2009 Relojes de arena
- 2013 Otras vidas — #2 (SP)
- 2018 20 Años — #3 (SP)

=== Singles ===
- 2003 "Cada Vez Que Estoy Sin Ti" — No. 1 (SP)
- 2003 "Sin Miedo a Perder" — No. 1 (SP)
- 2003 "Petalos Marchitos" — No. 15 (SP)
- 2004 "Precisamente Ahora" — No. 1 (SP)
- 2004 "Barcos de Papel" — No. 11 (SP)
- 2005 "La Ciudad Perdida" — No. 1 (SP)
- 2006 "Despertaré Cuando te Vayas" — No. 3 (SP)
- 2007 "Caminos de Ida y Vuelta"
- 2007 "El Perfume de la Soledad"
- 2008 "Dueña de este mar"
- 2009 "Que yo no quiero problemas"
