= LOS40 Music Awards 2016 =

Spanish music awards ceremony

- Date: December 1, 2016
- Location: Palau Sant Jordi
- Presented by: Los 40
- Hosted by: Santi Millán
- Website: los40.com/tag/los40_music_awards/a/

Television/radio coverage
- Network: Divinity,40TV

This was the eleventh edition of LOS40 Music Awards (formerly Los Premios 40 Principales), the annual music awards organized by Spanish radio Los 40. It was held on December 1, 2016, on Barcelona's Palau Sant Jordi, marking the first time the ceremony does not take place in Madrid. The nominations, alongside the new design of the awards, were revealed on October 5, 2016.

== Performances ==
| Artist(s) | Song(s) |
|---|---|
| David Bisbal | "Antes que no" |
| Juanes | "Fuego" |
| J Balvin; Bia | "Safari" |
| Kungs | "This Girl" |
| Sidonie | "Carreteras infinitas" |
| Manuel Carrasco | "Yo quiero vivir" |
| Maluma | "Borro cassette" |
| Fangoria | "Geometría polisentimental" |
| Leiva | "Sincericidio" |
| Maná | "De pies a cabeza" |
| Dani Martín | "Las ganas" |
| Jason Derulo | "Kiss the Sky" "Want to Want Me" |
| Morat | "Cómo te atreves" |
| Little Mix | "Shout Out to My Ex" |
| Miss Caffeina | "Mira cómo vuelo" |
| Juan Magan | "Quiero que sepas" |
| Robbie Williams | "Party Like a Russian" "Love My Life" "Angels" |

== Awards and nominations ==
=== Artist of the Year ===
- Manuel Carrasco
- Enrique Iglesias
- Fangoria
- Leiva
- Dani Martín

=== New Artist of the Year ===
- Furious Monkey House
- Nelou
- Ana Mena
- Morat
- Marlon

=== Album of the Year ===
- Leiva - Monstruos
- Love of Lesbian - El poeta Halley
- Manuel Carrasco - Bailar el viento
- Dani Martín - La montaña rusa
- Fangoria - Canciones para robots románticos

=== Song of the Year ===
- Enrique Iglesias feat. Wisin - Duele el corazón
- Pablo López feat. Juanes - Tu enemigo
- Fangoria - Geometría polisentimental
- Manuel Carrasco - Yo quiero vivir
- Morat - Cómo te atreves

=== Video of the Year ===
- Enrique Iglesias feat. Wisin - Duele el corazón
- Miss Caffeina - Mira cómo vuelo
- Juan Magan feat. Luciana - Baila conmigo
- Dani Martín - Las ganas
- Leiva - Sincericidio

=== International Artist of the Year ===
- Justin Bieber
- Coldplay
- Sia
- Adele
- Jennifer Lopez

=== International New Artist of the Year ===
- The Chainsmokers
- Drake
- Twenty One Pilots
- Lukas Graham
- Kungs

=== International Album of the Year ===
- Justin Bieber - Purpose
- Sia - This Is Acting
- Drake - Views
- Coldplay - A Head Full of Dreams
- Adele - 25

=== International Song of the Year ===
- Justin Bieber - Sorry
- Sia ft. Sean Paul - Cheap Thrills
- Adele - Hello
- Jennifer Lopez - Ain't Your Mama
- Drake ft. Wizkid & Kyla - One Dance

=== International Video of the Year ===
- OneRepublic - Wherever I Go
- David Guetta ft. Sia - Bang My Head
- Jennifer Lopez - Ain't Your Mama
- Coldplay - Up & Up
- Naughty Boy ft. Beyoncé - Runnin'

=== Best Latin Artist ===
- Juanes
- Carlos Vives
- J Balvin
- Maná
- Maluma

=== Tour of the Year ===
- Adele - Live 2016
- Coldplay - A Head Full of Dreams Tour
- Beyoncé - Formation World Tour
- U2 - Innocence + Experience Tour
- Manuel Carrasco - Gira Bailar el viento

=== Critic Award ===
- Love of Lesbian
- Michael Kiwanuka
- Leiva
- Frank Ocean
- El Guincho

=== Impactful Festival Act ===
- Love of Lesbian
- Miss Caffeina
- Sidonie
- Supersubmarina
- Sidecars

=== 50th Anniversary Golden Music Awards ===
On occasion of the 50th anniversary of Los 40, seven artists were awarded honorary awards to their respective careers. The following is the list of the recipients:

- Robbie Williams
- Juanes
- Miguel Bosé
- Maná
- Shakira
- Fangoria
- Michael Bublé
- Carlos Vives & Shakira - La bicicleta

=== Lo + 40 Artist Award ===
- Jason Derulo
- Sweet California
- Justin Bieber
- David Guetta
- Morat

=== Global Show Award ===
- J Balvin - Ginza
- Maluma - Borro cassette
- Carlos Vives & Shakira - La bicicleta
- Nicky Jam - Hasta el amanecer
- Enrique Iglesias feat. Wisin - Duele el corazón

=== Influencer of the Year ===
- ElRubius
- Sr. Cheeto
- Chusita
- Jorge Cremades
- Germán
