= El Canto del Loco =

Spanish pop rock band

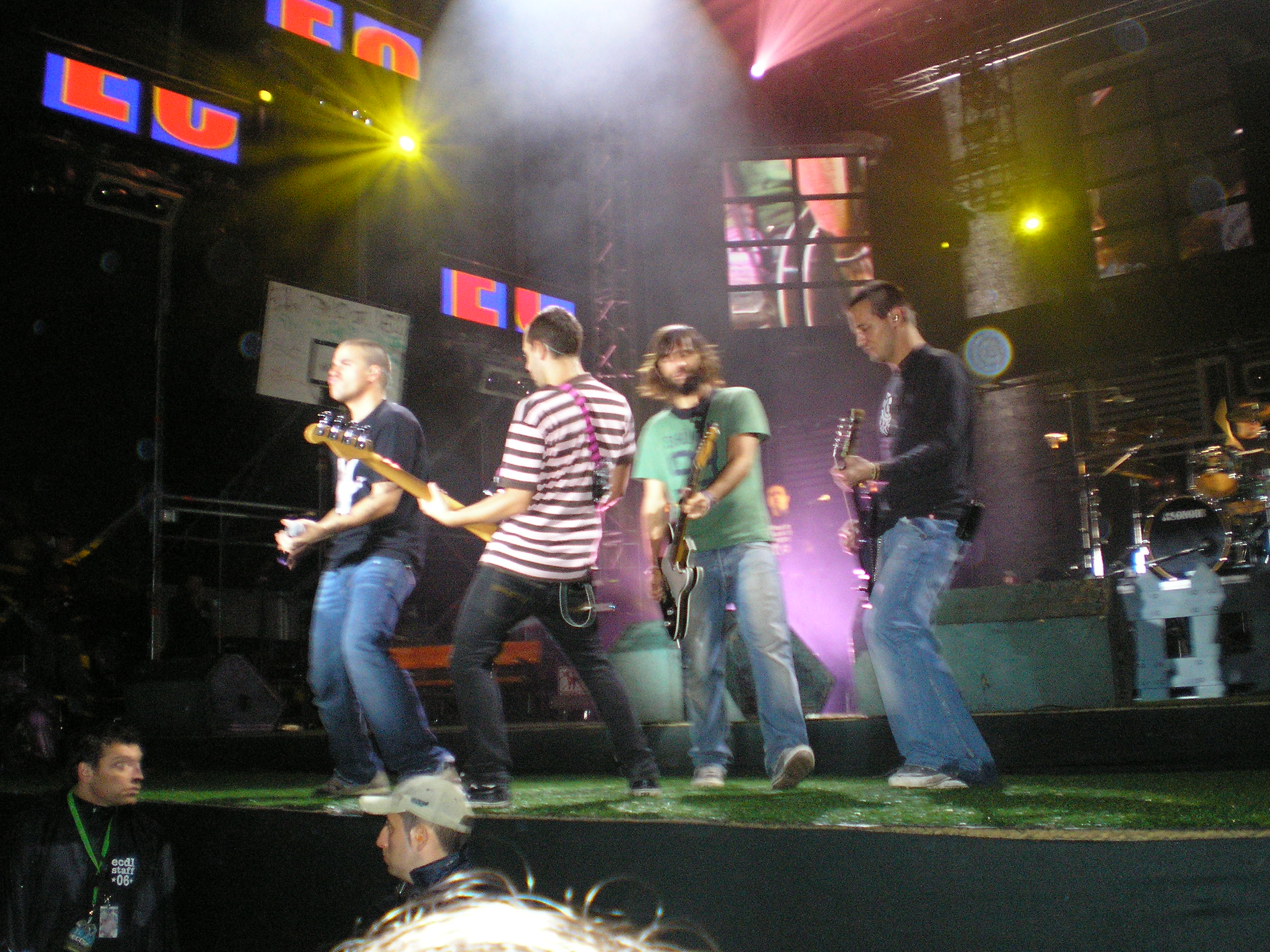
- El Canto del Loco in concert in Oviedo.

Background information
- Origin: Algete, Madrid, Spain
- Genres: Alternative rock, pop rock, pop punk, power pop
- Years active: 1994-2010
- Labels: Sony BMG (2000-2008); Sony Music (2008-2010)
- Past members: Dani Martín; David Otero; Chema Ruiz; Carlos Gamón; Iván Ganchegui; Jandro Velazquez
- Website: www.elcantodelloco.com

El Canto del Loco (The Singing of the Madman in English) was a Spanish pop rock band, although its members recognize that some of their songs are more in the style of power pop. The name of the band comes from the song "El Canto del Gallo" by Radio Futura.

The group sometimes known through the abbreviation ECDL was created in 1994 by Dani Martín and Ivan Ganchegui (who left the group in 2002) although the final line up would not come together until years later. Influenced mainly by other Spanish groups from the 1980s and with five studio albums, El Canto del Loco has gone on to sell more than a million albums, making them one of the most successful bands on the Spanish music scene in recent years.

The group announced their separation in 2010 as the members of the group wanted to pursue solo careers.

ECDL received three nominations for the MTV Europe Music Awards in the category of "Best Spanish Artist", which they won on two occasions, and they were awarded two Premio Ondas as "Best Live Act" (2004) and "Best Spanish Artist or Group" (2005).

== History of the group ==
=== Origins ===
El Canto del Loco began in 1994 when Dani Martín was studying at the Cristina Rota School of Dramatic Arts. There, he met Iván Ganchegui, a guitarist, and their shared musical tastes resulted in the formation of the band. Both were fans of Radio Futura and in particular of their song El canto del gallo (The Song of the Rooster), which led them to name the group El Canto del Loco. At this time the group also included a female drummer, a bassist and another guitarist. However, the latter soon left the group because of other commitments, and the day before their first concert David Otero, Dani's cousin, joined the group as a substitute.

The drummer and bassist also decided to leave the group not long after. The band's original drummer was replaced by Jandro Velázquez, an electrician, who was the son of friends of Dani's parents and who he first met in a flamenco competition. The position of bassist was filled by Chema Ruiz who was studying physiotherapy at the same university as David and who was a friend of one of his friends. With this line-up the band started to meet in a warehouse in the Algete area of Madrid in order to rehearse and their friends would act as critics.

=== Beginnings and first albums ===
A year later the group recorded a demo record, which they sent to different record companies. However, it was only when Dani met the record producer Pedro del Moral that they got their first opportunity. Moral listened to the demo and took it to the Ariola record company (currently Sony BMG), where Paco Martín, who had discovered groups such as Radio Futura and Hombres G, heard it. The group then received a call from Martín, who proposed a trial concert along with two other groups, with the objective that the record company would sign one of them. Despite the fact that the concert was not very good El Canto del Loco were eventually signed to the record label.

The group's first studio album went on sale on 16 June 2000, produced by Alejo Stivel, the former singer with the Spanish group Tequila. Before this album went on sale it was suggested that the group change their name, with other suggestions including "Superratones" (Super Rats), "Los móviles" (The Mobiles) and "La dulce sonrisa de Lulú" (Lulú's Sweet Smile). However, the group decided to keep their name and for this reason the first album was also called El Canto del Loco.

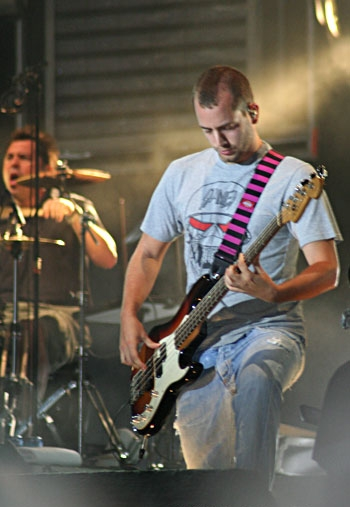
Jandro Velázquez (left) and Chema Ruiz (right) during a concert.

The arrival of Nigel Walker as producer produced a change in direction for the group and their second album, called A contracorriente (Against the Flow), was released on 1 March 2002, which had a more mature style. In the same year El Canto del Loco also received a nomination at the MTV Europe Music Awards for "Best Spanish Artist", although the group Amaral actually won the award.

=== Estados de ánimo (2003–2004) ===
Following the voluntary exit of Iván Ganchegui from the band, the rest of the group decided to take a break. However, a few days later David and Dani had both written several songs on their own and it was decided to record them using the four remaining members of the band. After a delay due to the busy work schedule of Nigel Walker, who was working on the new album by La Oreja de Van Gogh, the group recorded their third studio album which they called Estados de ánimo (States of Mind) and which went on sale on 26 May 2003.

In August of the same year their song Pasión (Passion), from the El canto del loco album, was included on the soundtrack of the film La fiesta (The Party). Directed by Carlos Villaverde and Manu Sanabria with a budget of only €6,000, the film is famous for being one of the cheapest Spanish films ever made. In October, the group collaborated in the recording of the album Tony Aguilar y amigos (Tony Aguilar and friends), organized by the Los 40 principales disc jockey Tony Aguilar. In collaboration with a number of other singers, El Canto del Loco played on the song Latido urbano (Urban Beat), which was the single taken from the album and which went on sale in November of that year. The profits from the record went to children's oncology hospitals run by the Asociación Española contra el Cáncer Spanish Cancer Association. They also recorded another of the songs on the album along with Aguilar himself, called Casi un Universo (Almost a Universe).

At the end of the year the group won the "Best Spanish Artist" award at the MTV Europe Music Awards beating artists such as Alejandro Sanz and La Oreja de Van Gogh.

In January 2004, they were commissioned to record a new version of the theme tune for the television series 7 vidas (7 lives), which had previously been interpreted by the singer Raimundo Amador. In the summer of that year they participated in a tribute album for Radio Futura, called Arde la calle (Burn the Street!) on which they interpreted the song Escuela de calor (School of Heat).

=== Zapatillas (2005–2007) ===
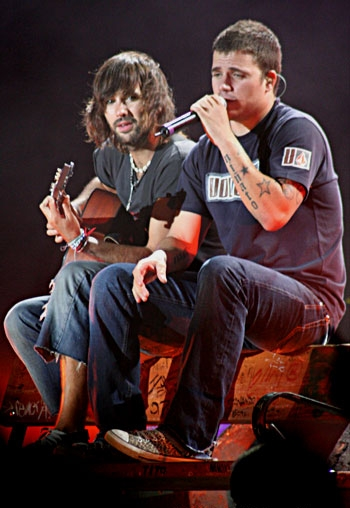
David Otero and Dani Martín during a concert.

David Otero visited the island of Phi Phi (Thailand) in March 2005, where he saw the damage caused by the 2004 Indian Ocean earthquake and tsunami. Along with other artists he decided to found an organisation called Kuarkx with the objective of collecting money for those affected by the disaster. Otero, with the help of his cousin Dani, wrote the song Despiértame (Wake me up!) and made it available over the Internet where it could be downloaded for 1.15 euros. When El Canto del Loco were recording their new album they decided to include the song and dedicate a proportion of the album's profits to the same cause. Their new album, which was called Zapatillas (Sneakers), was released on 21 June.

The group released their first album outside Spain in September of the same year. It was aimed at the United States and Latin America and was called 12 estados de ánimo (12 States of Mind), it is a compilation album containing the best songs from the three albums they had so far released in Spain. That same month the group was nominated for the third time in the MTV Europe Music Awards category for "Best Spanish Artist". The group gained second prize in the event celebrated in November in Lisbon.

In July 2006, while they were touring with Hombres G, they released a collection of their concerts in indoor venues. The collection was called Pequeños grandes directos (Great Little Gigs) and included recordings of performances in the Sala Caracol in Madrid (22-11-2002); Sala Bikini in Barcelona (30-12-03) and Sala Oasis in Zaragoza. The collection was released in a limited edition of 50,000 copies.

After finishing the Zapatillas tour and before Dani Martín started filming Yo soy la Juani (I am the Juani) directed by Bigas Luna rumours started to circulate regarding the possible break up of the group. The group denied these rumours and simply stated that after a long break they would return with new songs.

The group also participated in the recording of a compilation album in aid of a Telethon held by TV3. The album, which went on sale on 10 December 2006, was sold for 9 euros with the proceeds going to charities working with people suffering from chronic pain. It sold in conjunction with a number of Catalan newspapers (Avui, El Punt, La Vanguardia and El Periódico de Catalunya). The song chosen by the group was "Puede ser" (It Can Be), from their second studio album A Contracorriente, but with the difference that it was sung in Catalan under the title Pot ser. The song was later included on the compilation album Arriba el telón (Raise the curtain).

In 2007, Dani and David, along with the manager of El Canto del Loco, Carlos Vázquez, created the record label El Manicomio (Madhouse) Records, which was supported by the multinational Sony BMG and which released the debut album of the group Sin Rumbo (Without Direction).

=== Personas (2008–2009) ===
The recording of the group's next album started in October 2007 and lasted until February 2008. The album went on sale on 1 April under the name Personas (People). On release of the album El Canto del Loco also announced a tour to start at the end of 2009, where they would be supported by the group Sin Rumbo and the singer Lucas Masciano.

On 12 June 2008 Jandro announced that he would leave the group citing personal reasons. Despite this the group confirmed that the tour would not be affected and would take place with a new drummer, Carlos Gamón, who had previously played with the group Amaral and the singer Najwa Nimri.

The group played in the Rock in Rio festival on 28 June that year. This was the first time that the festival had been held in Spain. They received poor critical reviews although the performance was popular with their fans.

=== De personas a personas 2008 ===
The album "De personas a personas" (From people to people) was released at the end of 2008. It was a special limited edition of their "Personas" album with a new format (at 30x30cm the packaging was the same size as a vinyl album). However, the album was more than a rerelease of "Personas" as in addition to the 13 songs from the original album there were also six new songs and a DVD containing a lot of unpublished material.

=== Radio La Colifata presenta a El Canto del Loco 2009 ===
In 2009 El Canto del Loco released two albums. The first was 'Radio La Colifata presenta: El Canto del Loco' which contained 19 of the group's hits recorded live in Buenos Aires as well as a previously unpublished song called Quiero aprender de ti (I Want to Learn From You) and also a DVD with new videos.

=== Por mi y por todos mis compañeros ===
In addition ECDL also released Por mi y por todos mis compañeros (For Me and All My Mates) in 2009. It was an ambitious project that contained 11 standards of Spanish music all of which were recorded, arranged and produced by the band. It included songs from Smash, Los Piratas, Quique González, Enrique Urquijo, Los Ronaldos and Joan Manuel Serrat among others. The release also included a DVD called Y por mí el primero (And For Me the First), which contained a recording of the band's rehearsals.

== Members ==
- Dani Martín: vocals
- David Otero: guitars and backing vocals
- Chema Ruiz: bass
- Jandro Velázquez: drums (2000–2008)
- Iván Ganchegui: guitar (2000-2002)

== Influences ==
The group's main musical influence has been groups such as Radio Futura, of who they are known fans, Los Ronaldos, Los Rodríguez and Hombres G, who they are also good friends with. They have also been influenced to a lesser degree by groups such as Alejo Stivel (a member of this band was their first producer), Nacha Pop, Nachote Popeye and Duncan Dhu.

The members of the group also recognize that some of the songs on their album Estados de ánimo were also influenced by more recent bands such as Estopa (Tow), La Cabra Mecánica (The Mechanical Goat), M Clan.

== Collaborations ==
El Canto De Loco collaborated with Mexican singer, Natalia Lafourcade in the song Contigo, which became popular in Mexico. El Canto De Loco has also collaborated with Spanish band, Sueño De Morfeo

== Discography ==
=== Studio albums ===
Title	Album details	Sales
El Canto del Loco	Released: 2000; Label: Sony Music	111,000
A Contracorriente	Released: 2002; Label: Sony Music	150,000
Estados de ánimo	Released: 2004; Label: Sony Music	244,000
Zapatillas	Released: 2005; Label: Sony Music	421,000
Personas	Released: 2008; Label: Sony Music	30,000
Radio La Colifata presenta a El Canto del Loco	Released: 2009; Label: Sony Music	60,000

=== Live albums ===
Title	Album details	Sales
El Canto del Loco Live, Sala Caracol	Released: 2002; Label: Sony Music; Format: CD, DVD/VHS	20,000
El Canto del Loco Live, Sala Bikini	Released: 2004; Label: Sony Music	20,000
El Canto del Loco Live, Sala Oasis	Released: 2006; Label: Sony Music	20,000

=== Compilation albums ===
Title	Album details	Sales
Pequeños grandes directos	Released: 2006; Label: Sony Music	50,000
Arriba el telón	Released: 2007; Label: Sony Music	

=== Reissue album ===
Title	Album details
De personas a personas	Released: 2008; Label: Sony Music

=== DVD ===
Title	Album details
Hombres G & El Canto del Loco, Vicente Calderón Stadium	Released: 2005; Label: Sony Music; Format: CD, DVD/VHS
ECDL Episode 1	Released: 2006; Label: Sony Music

== Awards and nominations ==
Year	Award	Category	Result
2002	Premios Amigo (Friend Awards)	New Spanish Group	Nominated
2002	Premios Amigo (Friend Awards)	Best Spanish Group	Nominated
2002	MTV Europe Music Awards	Best Spanish Artist or Group	Nominated
2003	MTV Europe Music Awards	Best Spanish Artist or Group	Won
2004	Premios Ondas (Wave Awards)	Best Live Artist	Won
2005	MTV Europe Music Awards	Best Spanish Artist or Group	Won
2005	Premios 40 Principales (Top 40 Awards)	Best Spanish Group	Won
2006	Spanish Academy of Musical Arts and Sciences Music Awards	Best Tour (along with Hombres G)	Won
2006	Spanish Academy of Musical Arts and Sciences Music Awards	Best Group	Won
2008	Premios Ondas (Waves Music Awards)	Best Spanish Group	Won
2008	Premios 40 Principales (Top 40 Awards)	Best Group of Duo	Won
2008	Premios 40 Principales (Top 40 Awards)	Best Album: Personas	Won
2008	Premios 40 Principales (Top 40 Awards)	Best Song: "Eres tonto" (You Are Stupid)	Won
2008	Premios 40 Principales (Top 40 Awards)	Best Musical Video: "Eres tonto"	Won
2008	Premios 40 Principales (Top 40 Awards)	Best Tour or Concert	Won
