= Joaquín Sabina y Viceversa en directo =

Live album by Joaquín Sabina
- Released: 1986
- Studio: Salamanca Theatre, Madrid
- Genre: Pop rock; Rock Music; Singer-songwriter; hard rock
- Length: 100:20
- Label: Ariola
- Producer: Jesús Gómez, Joaquín Sabina, Pancho Varona

Joaquín Sabina chronology
Juez y parte (1985)	Joaquín Sabina y Viceversa en directo (1986)	Hotel dulce hotel (1987)

Singles from Joaquín Sabina y Viceversa en directo
- 1. "Como decirte, como contarte" Released: 1986; 2. "Zumo de neón" Released: 1986

Joaquín Sabina y Viceversa en directo (Joaquín Sabina & Viceversa live) is the second live album of the Spanish singer-songwriter Joaquín Sabina, which was recorded live in the Salamanca Theatre of Madrid on February 14 and 15, 1986. This album is the second release of Joaquín Sabina under Ariola and also his second and last collaboration with the band Viceversa, led by Pancho Varona.

== Background ==
Since the release of Juez y parte (Judge and side) the previous year, the popularity of Sabina started growing significantly to the point that the performer started a tour around many cities of Spain. This successful tour ended in Madrid, where this album was recorded. The songs performed in this record cover the albums: Inventario, Malas Compañías, Ruleta Rusa and Juez y parte including some new songs. During the concert, some invited artist took part on it including Javier Krahe, who had previously collaborated with Sabina in the album La mandrágora and Luis Eduardo Aute, who performed, during the concert, a song dedicated to Sabina entitled "Pongamos que hablo de Joaquín" (Let's say I'm talking about Joaquín). Other collaborators in the concert are Javier Gurruchaga and Jaume Sisa.

== Controversy ==
In 1986 Sabina participated in a campaign against the Spanish NATO membership. Although the country finally ended up staying inside the organisation after a referendum, the left wing sector of the Spanish politics, to which Sabina belonged to, reacted negatively to this fact. As a reaction, the performer interpreted during the concert, in a duo with Javier Krahe, a song entitled "Cuervo ingenuo" (Naive crow), which criticised the political ambiguity of PSOE, the ruling party and Felipe González, its leader and Spanish president.

== Track listing ==
CD 1:

No.	Title	Length
1.	"Ocupen su localidad (Occupy your place)"	03:41
2.	"Cuando era más joven (When I was younger)"	04:31
3.	"Princesa (Princess) With J.A. Muriel"	03:50
4.	"Hay mujeres... (There are women...) With Jaume Sisa"	05:00
5.	"Zumo de neón (Neon juice)"	03:07
6.	"El joven aprendiz de pintor (The young painter learner)"	03:50
7.	"¿Como decirte, como contarte? (How to say it?, how to tell it to you?) With Javier Martínez"	04:15
8.	"Tratado de impaciencia Nº11 (Treated for impatience Nº11)"	02:37
9.	"Que demasiao? (Relly too much?) With J.R. Ripoll"	03:31
10.	"Juana la loca (Juana, the crazy girl)"	06:00

CD2:

No.	Title	Length
1.	"Calle melancolía (Melancholy street)"	04:20
2.	"Pongamos que hablo de Joaquín (Let's say I'm talking about Joaquín) By Luis Eduardo Aute"	03:26
3.	"Caballo de cartón (Paperboard horse)"	04:45
4.	"Cuervo ingenuo (Naive crow) with Javier Krahe"	04:05
5.	"Whisky sin soda (Whisky without soda) With Hilario Camacho"	04:27
6.	"Rebajas de enero (January sales) with Javier Martínez"	03:41
7.	"Adiós adiós!! (Bye bye!!) with Javier Gurruchaga"	03:30
8.	"Pisa el acelerador (Step on the accelerator) with Javier Gurruchaga"	02:51
9.	"Pongamos que hablo de Madrid (Let's say I'm talking about Madrid) with Antonio Sánchez"	03:56
10.	"Eh, Sabina!! (Hey Sabina!!)"	03:16
11.	"Despedida (Goodbye)"	01:26

== Reception ==
Due to the success of the tour and partly because the controversy created by some of the songs, this album turned into the commercial breakthrough of Joaquín Sabina. In fact, its sales were much higher than all his previous releases. Two decades later, it was released a DVD version of this album.
