= Alberto Pérez (musician) =

Spanish musician, singer, composer and record producer (born 1950)

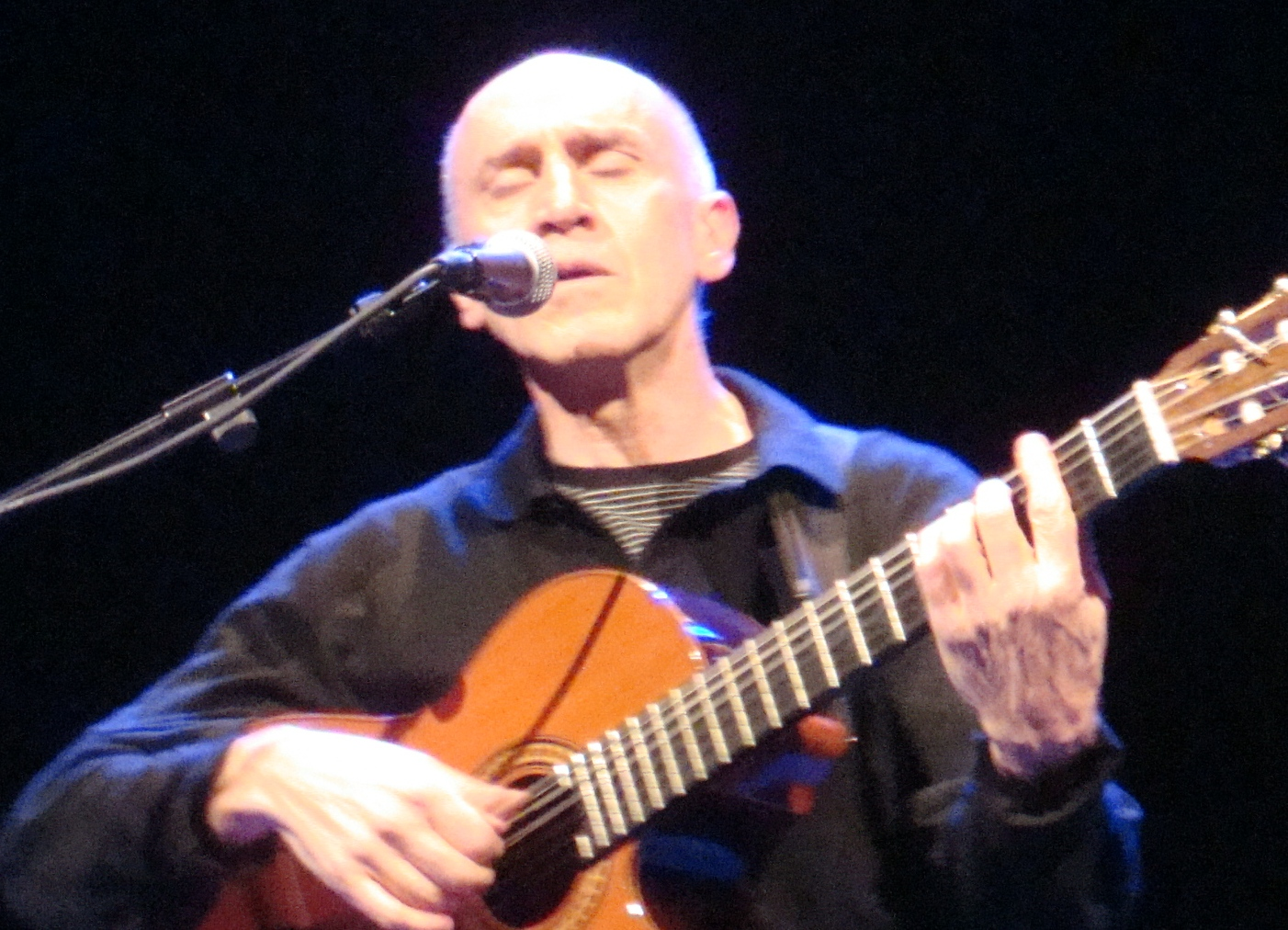

Background information
- Also known as: El Trovador Paisajista (The Landscape Minstrel)
- Born: Alberto Pérez Lapastora; 20 August 1950 (age 75); Sigüenza, Spain
- Genres: jazz; latin; a cappella
- Occupations: Musician; singer; composer; producer
- Instruments: Vocals; guitar
- Years active: 1956–present
- Labels: Ariola; CBS; BMG; Avizor Records
- Website: albertoperez.info

Alberto Pérez Lapastora (born 20 August 1950) is a Spanish musician, singer, composer and record producer. He has also been involved in radio and cinema throughout his career.

== Professional biography ==
=== 1956–80 early years ===
He took his first steps in the music world in the choir of the Sagrada Familia (1956) and the so-called Rondalla Seguntina (1961), where he set foot on a stage and went on tours for the first time. At 16 he formed a pop group called "Somos" ("This is us") for which he composed his first songs and recorded his first demo tape. While doing military service in Madrid (1968–70), he got to know musicians from Guinea and for the first time had the chance to experiment with non-European music. He moved permanently to Madrid (1972), studied Spanish Philology (Linguistics) at the Complutense University and music, harmony and counterpoint at the Royal School of Music. In those years he travelled extensively around different European countries, where he worked as a 'troubadour' and theatre musician.

=== 1981 "La Mandrágora" (The Mandrake) ===
In 1981 he formed "La Mandrágora" together with Joaquín Sabina and Javier Krahe, a trio to which he brought his romantic touch as well as a sense of showmanship, and with whom he would make a record of the same name that is still being re-released.

=== 1984–96 "Si yo fuera presidente" (If I were the President) – RTVE. The Alberto Pérez Orchestra ===
In 1984 he was invited to take part in the Spanish television programme "Si yo fuera presidente" for which he created a character inspired in the vocalists and crooners of the 1940s and 1950s who sung a selection of around 100 famous if long-forgotten songs. He formed the Alberto Pérez Orchestra that he would conduct for 12 years. His record "Amar y Vivir" (To Love and To Live) belongs to that period.

=== 1989 "Corazón loco" (Crazy Heart) – Radio 3 ===
In 1989 he accepted a proposal from Spanish Radio 3 to produce and host a programme about the history and evolution of Afrocuban music. It would be the origin of "Corazón Loco", a radio space that Alberto Pérez would conduct with a guitar in his hands and conversing with the listeners. Although with the unexplained closure of Radio 3 so too the programme had to end.

=== 1990–99 "Sobre la pista" (On the dance floor) y "Tiempo de baile" (Time to dance): meeting Chicho Sánchez Ferlosio ===
Meeting Chicho Sánchez Ferlosio – with whom Alberto Pérez would have a fifteen-year-long friendship till Chicho's death in 2003 – was fruitful in the way of a collection of 20 dance songs, of various genre, that were composed as stylistic exercises. This enterprise would keep them busy for over two years and would eventually take form in "Sobre la pista" (1990) and "Tiempo de baile" (1997), produced and interpreted by Alberto Pérez himself and in which musicians from different generations and nationalities took part. Another project they both worked on was composing the soundtrack to the film Buenaventura Durruti, anarchist (1999), this time performed by Chicho.

=== 1994–95 Voice and vibraphone: Alberto Pérez y Alberto Vergara ===
He met Alberto Vergara in 1994 while on a tour in Morocco and managed to arrange and perform, using only vocals and vibraphone, an overview of the history of the 'bolero'. Their collaboration lasted for about two years until the return of the Venezuelan vibraphonist, Alberto Vergara, to his home country.

=== 1995 Coming back to songwriting and solo music tours. A new guitar-playing technique. ===
After his experience with the vibraphonist, Alberto Vergara, Pérez set about developing a new guitar-playing technique so as to be able to interpret some of his dance songs, as it were, in troubadour fashion. He put it to the test in a show called "Más allá de la Mandrágora", that is, "Beyond the Mandrágora" (1995), which most unexpectedly brought him back to the solo singing tours, leading him to give up his role as orchestra conductor.

=== 1997–2000 "Avizor Records" and Carmen Martín Gaite ===
In 1997 Pérez and the writer Carmen Martín Gaite launched the record company "Avizor Records", with a view to giving publicity to new poets and musicians. The project was solely funded with earnings made from their own recitals and it lasted until Carmen's death in 2000.

=== 2005 "Alberto Pérez y su Orquesta Volátil" (The Volatile Orchestra) ===
In 2005 he set up the show "Alberto Pérez y su Orquesta Volátil" –entirely done a cappella- in order to pay tribute to his friend Chicho Sánchez Ferlosio. This half-spoken, half-sung proposal with elements from the troubadour tradition would take Pérez on theatre tours.

== Working for the radio. Workshops and lectures. Acting. ==
Pérez has directed and conducted various radio programmes, among which the most noteworthy include "Corazón loco" (RNE, 1989–90) and "A vivir, que son dos días" or "Live it up, life's too short" (SER, 1994–95). He has also been invited to lecture at various universities and academic institutions, most especially to talk about the 'bolero' and Central and South American music; and he has also taken part in workshops for professional musicians aimed at enabling them to identify various genre and rhythms. As to his film acting, his most popular contribution was in the film "El viaje a ninguna parte" (Voyage to Nowhere) by Fernando Fernán Gómez (1986).

== Records ==
- "La mandrágora (Album)". CBS, 1981
- "Amar y Vivir", Ariola, 1984
- "Sobre la pista", BMG, 1990
- "Tiempo de baile", Avizor Records, 1997

== Sources and References ==
- AquíNoHueleAPapel (Here it does not smell of paper) (Irene Ferradas Torre-Marín blog, 2010). "Vivo con los mismos anhelos que cualquier otra persona: dedicarme a lo que me gusta, viajar y disfrutar de una buena compañía”. (I live with the same longings as everyone else: to devote my time to what I like doing, to travel and be in good company.)
