= Ferlosio =

Ferlosio is a surname. Notable people with the surname include:

- Chicho Sánchez Ferlosio (1940–2003), Spanish singer-songwriter
- Rafael Sánchez Ferlosio (1927–2019), Spanish writer
