= Esta boca es mía (album) =

Studio album by Joaquín Sabina
- Released: 1994
- Studio: Cinearte Studios, Madrid
- Genre: Hard rock; pop rock; country; salsa; Latin
- Length: 50:20
- Label: Ariola
- Producer: Joaquín Sabina; Pancho Varona; Antonio García de Diego

Joaquín Sabina chronology
Física y química (1992)	Esta boca es mía (1994)	Yo, mi, me, contigo (1996)

Singles from Esta boca es mía
- 1. "Por el Bulevar de los sueños rotos" Released: 1994; 2. "Esta noche contigo" Released: 1994; 3. "El blues de lo que pasa en mi escalera" Released: 1994; 4. "Ruido" Released: 1994; 5. "Ganas de" Released: 1995

Esta Boca es Mía (literally translated, This mouth Is mine, more accurate meaning: This Is What I Stand For) is the ninth studio album of the Spanish singer-songwriter Joaquín Sabina released in 1994, two years after the release of his previous album Física y química. This album didn't reach the same level of popularity and commercial success of his previous release, however, it reached good sales and also gave some hit songs and favorable reviews.

== Background ==
In the mid-1990s, Sabina was in his personal and professional maturity and found himself in the challenge of producing an album that could be at the same level or better than Física y química. For that, as always, the performer not only teamed up with his fellow collaborators, Pancho Varona and Antonio García de Diego, who would arrange most of the songs, but also, started counting with the help of a new collaborator, Olga Román, a jazz singer who had previous experience in composing and performing jazz songs live and who would turn into Sabina's back vocal since then, till 2009, when she restarted her solo music career.

As in the rest of his albums, Joaquín Sabina found the inspiration for the tracks in his personal experiences, such as his paternity, his recent divorce form his former wife Isabel Oliart, his life in Madrid and also his frequent trips to Latin America.

== Production ==
In order to produce the album, the singer felt the need of doing something different from his previous musical experiences and decided to create something more eclectic. In fact, Esta boca es mía is known for its variety of styles and influences and for the collaboration of various important music personalities such as Rosendo Mercado and the prominent Cuban singer Pablo Milanes. Some songs tend to have an evident rock 'n roll flavour while others have a much more Latin influence with styles such as salsa and bolero.

Four singles were released from this release; the first one and maybe the most popular song of this album is "Por el Bulevar de los sueños rotos" (By the boulevard of broken dreams), a song that would turn into another of the most representative songs of Joaquín Sabina. As in "Y nos dieron las diez", the most famous track from the previous album, in this song it's shown a really noticeable Mexican spirit, in fact, the performer acknowledged that the song was an homage to the widely recognised singer Chavela Vargas, of whom Sabina considers a follower. This song is notable for its references to Mexican artists such as Frida Kalho and Diego Rivera and to other people and elements of the Mexican cultural imagery. The Promotional Video for this single, directed by Juanma Bajo Ulloa, was also set in a typical Mexican atmosphere.

Another hit from this album was "Esta noche contigo" (Tonight with you), which was a love song that opened the album but that was released as the second single. This song was also warmly received, but as the following singles, it would fail to reach the popularity of "En el bulevar de los sueños rotos".

The following single is a hard rock song called "El blues de lo que pasa en mi escalera", (The blues of what happens in the stairs of my apartment building). A peculiar song in which the singer tells past and present stories about people he knew when he was a kid, and with whom he was still in contact. Sexual affairs, economic ruin and the undeserved rise to the top of some people at the expense of the protagonists, are the main themes of this song.

One of the following singles of this release is the flamenco flavoured song "Ruido" (Noise), which is a song that revolves around the chaotic and traumatic divorce of a couple that was filled with faith and ilussion in the start, but that was later prey of disappointments, broken promises, and coexistence problems that end up leading to the unhappy ending. This song was solely arranged with a Spanish Guitar and with a Flamenco box.

The next and last single extracted from this album was "Ganas de..." (I feel like...), which was a country love song.

Another interesting song from this album was "La casa por la ventana" (Spending all what they have) performed as a duo with Pablo Milanes, a seemingly cheerful salsa arranged song that actually portrays the sad story of the immigrants from Asia, Latin America and North Africa who arrived to Spain in the mid-1990s. This song highlights the difficulties immigrants faced in a country where immigration was, till then, a completely new, and totally unknown phenomena.

== Track listing ==
No.	Title	length
1	Esta noche contigo (Tonight with you)	4:50
2	Por el bulevar de los sueños rotos (By the boulevard of broken dreams)	4:03
3	Incluso en estos tiempos (Even in these times)	2:53
4	Siete crisantemos (Seven chrysanthemums)	5:14
5	Besos con sal (Salty kisses)	3:50
6	Ruido (Noise)	4:27
7	El blues de lo que pasa en mi escalera (The blues of what happens in the stairs of my apartment building)	4:50
8	Como un explorador (Just like an explorer)	3:26
9	Mujeres fatal (Fatal women)	4:40
10	Ganas de... (I feel like...)	3:20
11	La casa por la ventana (Spending all what they have)	4:27
12	Más de cien mentiras (More than a thousand lies)	6:43
13	Esta boca es mía (This is what I stand for)	3:02

== Reception ==
This album failed to achieve the widespread popularity of Física y química. However, it also produced very well remembered songs both in Spain and in Latin America.

== Versions of some songs ==
- "Esta boca es mía", the title song and also the ending song from this album, was covered by the singer Olga Roman, whose version was included in the homenage album "Entre todas las mujeres", released in 2003, nine years later.
- Por el bulevar de los sueños rotos was covered by Lua Ríos, and also released as part of the tracklist of the same homage album.
- In 2020, the song "Ruido" was covered by the band Fito & Fitipaldis in a collaboration with the singer Coque Malla as part of the traclikst of the homenage album "Ni tan joven ni tan viejo".
- Also in 2020, the song "Ganas de" was covered by the electro-reggae band Macaco in a collaboration with the producer Carlos Sadness.
