= Olga Román =

Spanish Latin jazz and pop singer

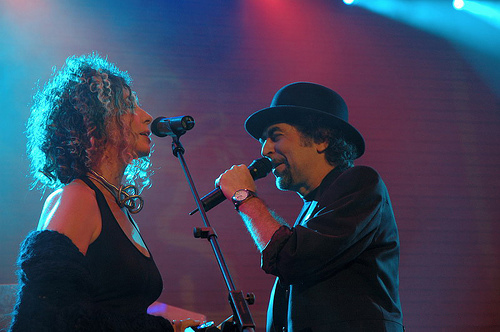
Roman with Joaquín Sabina

Olga Román (1956/01/16) is a Spanish Latin jazz and pop singer.

== Life and career ==
In 1985, she studied music and graduated from the prestigious Berklee College of Music in 1987. Whilst in Boston she performed at the Ryles Jazz Club. She moved to New York City, where he played the club circuit in Greenwich Village. During her period in America, she was lead singer of Latin music groups El Eco, Aché and Latinoamérica musical and in 1988 created the Olga Román Quartet with whom she performed at the Montreal Jazz Festival, Quebec Jazz Festival, Boston Globe Jazz Festival. among others. She also appeared in several live radio programs and television shows.

In January 1993, she returned to Spain and has since been working with Joaquín Sabina, featuring on albums such as Esta boca es mía, Yo, mi, me, contigo, 19 días y 500 noches, and Nos sobran los motivos and Dímelo en la calle. She has collaborated with Jorge Drexler, Luis Eduardo Aute and Pedro Guerra and recorded the main themes of several Spanish films.

In 1994 she was featured on the album Hand in Hand by Unu Mondo.

Round and round (2001) was her first solo album where most of the songs are written by her. Pedro Guerra collaborated on this album, writing songs, "Without realizing it" and "How I can know", ideal for the style of Olga Román.

Her song "Again" was nominated for Best Original Song at the 2002 Goya Film Awards. In recent years, she has increasingly featured as a soloist and in 2011 released the album "Seguir caminando". Fanfare said of her in 1983, "From the moment lead singer Olga Roman gets her grip on a song you know you're on to something sensational here. She has an icy-elegant voice and her traditional folk harmonies are simple — and simply marvelous."

She is currently an instructor at Berklee's campus in Valencia, Spain.

== Discography ==
=== Albums ===
- 2001 - Vueltas y Vueltas
- 2005 - Olga Román 2
- 2011 - Seguir Caminando
- 2012 - De Agua y Laurel
