= Física y química =

Física y química (Physics and chemistry)

Studio album by Joaquín Sabina
- Released: 1992
- Studio: Cinearte Studios, Madrid
- Genre: Hard rock; pop rock
- Length: 50:20
- Label: Ariola
- Producer: Joaquín Sabina; Pancho Varona; Antonio García de Diego; Luis Eduardo Aute

Joaquín Sabina chronology
Mentiras piadosas (1990)	Física y química (Physics and chemistry) (1992)	Esta boca es mía (1994)

Singles from Física y química
- 1. "Y nos dieron las diez" Released: 1992; 2. "A la orilla de la chimenea" Released: 1992; 3. "Todos menos tú" Released: 1992; 4. "La del pirata cojo" Released: 1992; 5. "Peor para el sol" Released: 1993; 6. "Pastillas para no soñar" Released: 1993

Física y química (English: "Physics and Chemistry") is the eighth studio album of the Spanish singer-songwriter Joaquín Sabina, which was released in 1992, two years after Mentiras Piadosas, his previous release. This album is one of Sabina's most popular, and also marked a "before and after" in his career. Unexpectedly, the sales of this album set another record in the trajectory of the performer, outselling Hotel dulce hotel, which was, until then, his best selling album.

== Background ==
In 1992, after having released some successful albums, Sabina had already established himself as one of the most creative and recognised Spanish performers. His popularity in Latin America was on the rise with some tours and performances in countries such as Mexico and Venezuela, where he had an enormous fan base. The singer found the inspiration for this album in some personal or sentimental experiences and some other day-to-day stories. Some of the songs of the tracklist of the album are also inspired by the lives and experiences of some of his friends, and in some cases, enemies. In this album the performer confessed to have turned into the antihero of his own songs, which was criticised by some intellectuals such as Antonio Muñoz Molina; however, the performer admitted that it couldn't avoid it. Sabina had turned into someone who was loved by many, but also hated by many others due to the message of some of his songs and his clear and sometimes harmful opinions.

The initial title of this album was going to be Verdades como puños (Truths like fists), as a response to the title of his previous record. However, the title was changed to Física y química, a phrase which was inspired by a famous statement by the Spanish Physician Severo Ochoa, who said textually that "Love is physics and chemistry".

In the cover photo of this release, Sabina appears with a painted beard, emulating Groucho Marx.

== Style and production ==
As usual, Sabina teamed up with his friends and longtime producers, Pancho Varona and Antonio García de Diego, who had collaborated on some of his previous releases. The rock spirit of his recent releases is present in all the songs, although some were influenced by other styles.

The album starts with "Y nos dieron las diez" (We went on till ten o'clock), the first single and also the most popular song. This track, which features a heavy Mexican traditional vibe, talks about a summer love story during a tour. The protagonist fell in love with the waitress of a bar but one year later, when he returns to the same city, the main character discovers that everything that he appreciated had disappeared. This song, for which was released a promotional video, turned into a smash hit both in Spain and Latin America, especially in Mexico, where this song has been covered by other artists and performed by famous mariachi bands.

The second song of the tracklist, "Conductores suicidas" (Suicide drivers), which shows a more rock sound, is about the descent to the world of addictions and excesses of an unspecified popular Spanish singer in the late 1980s and early 1990s. In this song, Sabina talks about a friendship that was abruptly ended because of those problems. Some years later, the performer confessed that he was referring to Manolo Tena, who was still very popular, but had a growing problem with drug abuse.

The following song of this album, surrounded by a blues atmosphere, is "Yo quiero ser una chica almodovar" (I want to be an Almodovar girl), a song dedicated to the awarded Spanish film director Pedro Almodovar and the actresses who had participated in his films such as Carmen Maura, Rossi de Palma and Victoria Abril. The song not only reflects Sabina's admiration for Almodovar's movies, but also makes chained references to the titles of those films, such as Dark Habits, Tie Me Up! Tie Me Down!, High heels and Women on the Verge of a Nervous Breakdown.

The following track and second single of this album is the intimate and passionate ballad "A la orilla de la chimenea" (By the edge of the fireplace), which also received a very favourable critical and commercial response.

Another song, the third maxi single extracted from this album, "Todos menos tú" (Everyone but you), describes with detail the vibrant nightlife of Madrid and the varied types of people that one can see in the Spanish capital city, from "That kind of hairdressers who are known as stylists" to "lascivious divorced women with Madonna styled hair".

The fourth single of this album is "La del pirata cojo" (The life of the crippled pirate), in which the singer invites his audience to live different lives far away from the ordinary stories.

The fifth single, entitled "Peor para el sol" (Worse for the sun), has very different subject matter. Sabina describes an infidelity with a married woman trying to find something different in a dark bar of Madrid. In this song, the singer describes a scene with the lovers in bed, snorting cocaine from the wedding photo of the woman. Finally, the illicit romance ends with the protagonist getting drunk to try to forget the affair.

The sixth and last maxi single of this album released in 1993 was the ending track, "Pastillas para no soñar" (Pills to avoid dreaming), an optimistic song in which the audience is invited to live freely, without worries, regardless of what others say. This song is noteworthy because of its arrangements, on which Sabina collaborated with the Municipal Orchestra of Mostoles, a little town of southern Madrid.

== Track listing ==
No.	Title	Length
1.	"Y nos dieron las diez (We went on 'till ten o'clock)"	05:02
2.	"Conductores suicidas (Suicide drivers)"	05:03
3.	"Yo quiero ser una chica almodovar (I want to be an Almodovar girl)"	04:11
4.	"A la orilla de la chimenea (By the edge of the fireplace)"	04:08
5.	"Todos menos tú (Everyone but you)"	04:26
6.	"La del pirata cojo (The one about the crippled pirate)"	04:38
7.	"La canción de las noches perdidas (The song of lost nights)"	03:54
8.	"Los cuentos que yo cuento (The tales I tell)"	03:27
9.	"Peor para el sol (Worse for the sun)"	04:55
10.	"Amor se llama el juego (Love is the name of the game)"	04:33
11.	"Pastillas para no soñar (Pills to prevent dreaming)"	03:58

== Reception ==
Física y química turned into a milestone in Sabina's career, both critically and commercially. The album was praised for the originality of its lyrics and the interesting stories featured in the track-listing. Commercially, this record sold more than a million copies in Spain and Latin America, outselling Hotel dulce hotel (1987), previously his best-selling album. This sales record remained unchallenged till 1999, when the album 19 días y 500 noches (19 days and 500 nights) unexpectedly reached even higher sales.

== Versions of some songs ==
- The song "Y nos dieron las diez" has been covered by countless artists. One of the many versions was sung by the popular diva Rocío Durcal, in whose version can be appreciated an even more intense Mexican atmosphere. Another version was sung in 2003 by the Bolero singer Tamara, which was included in the tribute album Entre todas las mujeres (Between all women).
- "La canción de las noches perdidas" Was covered in 2003 by the singer Pasión Vega whose version was also included on the tribute album Entre todas las mujeres.

== Sales ==
Region	Certification	Certified units/sales
Argentina	—	87,279
