= Randy Armstrong (musician) =

American musician

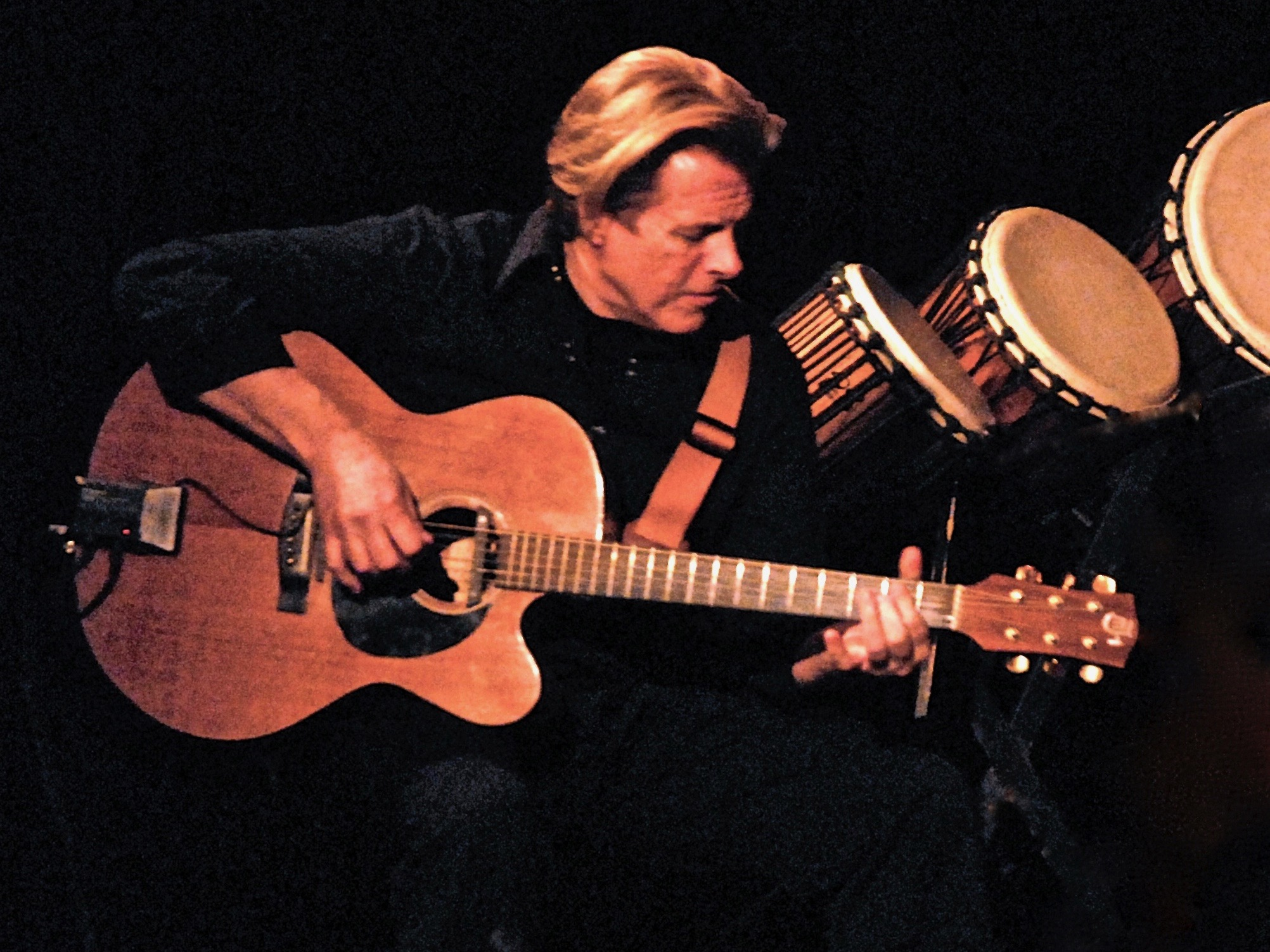

Background information
- Born: 1951 or 1952 (age 74–75); Elkins, West Virginia, U.S.
- Genres: World fusion, ethno jazz
- Occupations: Musician, composer
- Instrument: Guitar
- Labels: Philo, Rounder, Global Pacific, CBS Associated, Rhino, Domo, UMP, Ellipsis Arts, Navarre, Mesa/Bluemoon
- Website: www.randyarmstrong.com

Randy Armstrong (born 1951 or 1952) is an American musician, guitarist, multi-instrumentalist, composer, and bandleader. Armstrong plays mainly world fusion, ethno jazz and new age music and was a founding member of Do’a / Do’a World Music Ensemble (aka Do’ah). He is the bandleader for the Randy Armstrong Trio and Randy Armstrong World Fusion Ensemble and a founding member of the contemporary jazz/world fusion music groups, Unu Mondo & Beyond Borders. He currently performs solo and with his World Fusion Ensemble. He has released and appeared on dozens of albums, film, theatre and dance score recordings as a soloist, accompanist and with all his ensembles. He made the Top 10 of the Billboard New Age Music Charts, with Do’ah's album, World Dance on the Global Pacific/CBS Associated label.

Armstrong performs from a collection of over 300 instruments from around the world. He has composed and recorded numerous scores for film, television, theater and dance.

== Early life ==
Armstrong was born in Elkins, West Virginia. He grew up in Columbus, Ohio during his school years and graduated from Eastmoor High School in 1969. He is a follower of the Baháʼí Faith.

== Education ==
Armstrong graduated with a B.A. in Music Performance and Composition / World Music Studies from Columbia Pacific University in 1983. Subsequently, his World Music studies continued at the University of Ghana-Legon. He has studied West African drumming with Babatunde Olatunji and various other West African drummers.

== Musical career ==
=== Career beginnings ===
At the age of 15, Armstrong joined the regional rock band The Gears, recording two singles under the Counterpart and Hillside Record labels, respectively. Armstrong also joined and toured with the rock and R&B band Annie Oakley.

During the late 60's and early 70's, Armstrong was greatly influenced by the civil and equal rights movements and anti-Vietnam War demonstrations.

=== Do’a/Do’ah (1974–1991) ===
In 1973, Armstrong moved to New Hampshire and in 1974, met classically trained flute player Ken LaRoche and with him formed the music group Do’a (a Persian word meaning "a call to prayer and meditation"). Armstrong and LaRoche composed and recorded music that fused western classical, jazz and folk music traditions with music influences and instruments around the world. They were signed to a four-album contract with Philo Records distributed by Rounder Records.

In 1986, Do’a World Music Ensemble received official recognition from the United Nations for their concert tour promoting the International Year of Peace.

In 1989, their album World Dance, which was published on the Global Pacific/CBS Associated label, reached the Top 10 on the Billboard chart for New Age music.

=== Unu Mondo (1992–1998) ===
In 1992, Armstrong co-founded the Contemporary Jazz / World Fusion music group, Unu Mondo with bassist and composer Volker Nahrmann. In 1994 their album, Hand in Hand was released and featured vocals from Spanish singer Olga Román, saxophone player Charlie Jennison and Brazilian drummer, Henrique De Almeida. Unu Mondo appeared on the compilation albums, World Visions – The Rhythms, Ageless Pathway and Enlightened Minds released by Global Pacific Records in 1996. The ensemble toured throughout United States.

=== Randy Armstrong Trio and other groups (1998–2015) ===
In 1998 through 2000, Armstrong was commissioned to score and record the original soundtrack for the PBS television series, Dinner on the Diner, filmed in South Africa, Spain, Scotland and Southeast Asia (Thailand and Malaysia). Armstrong’s soundtrack for the series was released by Ellipsis Arts in 2000. After returning from a trip to Italy in 2001, Armstrong recorded his solo guitar album, No Regrets, originally released by UMP Records in 2002 and subsequently re-released by the Los Angeles-based Domo Record label in 2003.

Armstrong formed the Randy Armstrong Trio and World Fusion Ensemble with fellow musicians bassist Volker Nahrmann; drummer Jose Roman Duque; African drummer/dancer Theo Nii Martey and Shamou on world percussion and vocals.

=== Beyond Borders (2015–present) ===
In 2015, Armstrong formed the Beyond Borders octet with bassist, keyboardist and composer Volker Nahrmann. They recorded the album Beyond Borders, which was released on the UMP label.

The album Beyond Borders was nominated for Best World Album by the 2015 ZMR Music Awards.

After returning from a tour in South Africa with the all-women’s chorus, Voices From The Heart in 2018, Armstrong commissioned a handmade set of South African marimbas and formed Randy Armstrong and WorldBeat Marimba in 2019.

In 2023, Randy Armstrong & WorldBeat Marimba received the Best of NH 2023 “Ambassadors of Peace” award by New Hampshire Magazine.

== Career in music education ==
Armstrong is also active in arts education in New Hampshire, where he currently resides.

He has served as an Arts Councilor for the New Hampshire State Council on the Arts from 2003 to 2012 appointed by Governor Craig Benson and reappointed by Governor John Lynch. Armstrong also served on the board of directors of the New Hampshire Alliance for Arts Education. After the signing of the Good Friday Agreement in 1998, Armstrong was selected as an artist representative to attend a Cultural Trade Mission to Ireland, Northern Ireland and England sponsored by Governor Jeanne Shaheen of New Hampshire and in May 2005 attended a Curatorial Research trip on Son Jarocho music in Xalapa and Veracruz, Mexico for the Boston based New England Foundation for the Arts.

Armstrong was the director of the African Drumming and World Percussion Ensemble and instructor of North Indian sitar and tabla at Phillips Exeter Academy in New Hampshire from 1991 to 2020. Since 2002, he has taught graduate courses at Plymouth State University. He received the 2017 New Hampshire Governor's Arts Award for Arts Education and was an artist in residence with the Portsmouth Symphony Orchestra in 2017-2018.

Armstrong is on the juried artist rosters of the New Hampshire State Council on the Arts for Arts Education and Arts In Health.

Armstrong also performs and conducts artist-in-residence programs with Genevieve Aichele, founder of the New Hampshire Theater Project. They have released two storytelling and music albums, World Tales Volume 1 in 1996 and World Tales Volume 2 in 2007 on the UMP label.

== Discography ==
=== Solo and Ensembles ===
Album or Single Title	Artist or Band	Year	Label
Sooner or Later/Come Back to Me	The Gears	1967	Counterpart
Feel Right/Explanation	The Gears	1968	Hillside
Light Upon Light	Do’a- Randy Armstrong & Ken LaRoche	1977	Philo/Rounder
Ornament of Hope	Do’a- Randy Armstrong & Ken LaRoche	1979	Philo/Rounder
Ancient Beauty	Do’a- Randy Armstrong & Ken LaRoche	1981	Philo/Rounder
Companions of the Crimson Ark	Do’a World Music Ensemble	1984	Philo/Rounder
Do’a- The Early Years	Randy Armstrong & Ken LaRoche	1987	Rounder
World Dance	Do’ah	1989	Global Pacific/CBS-Mesa/Bluemoon
One World	Unu Mondo - Randy Armstrong & Volker Nahrmann	1992	UMP Records
Hand in Hand	Unu Mondo - Randy Armstrong & Volker Nahrmann	1994	Global Pacific/Navarre
World Tales Vol. 1	Armstrong & Aichele	1996	UMP Records
Dinner on the Diner: 2 CD Boxset	Randy Armstrong	2000	Ellipsis Arts/Rykodisc
No Regrets	Randy Armstrong	2002	UMP Records
No Regrets	Randy Armstrong	2003	Domo Records
World Tales Vol. 2	Armstrong & Aichele	2007	UMP Records
LEGACY Complete Works: 5 CD Boxset featuring Do’a	Randy Armstrong & Ken Laroche	2008	UMP Records
Hamlet, Prince of Denmark (Original Score)	Randy Armstrong	2009	UMP Records
Black Thunder	Black Thunder Singers with Randy Armstrong & Volker Nahrmann	2010	UMP Records
Beyond Borders	Randy Armstrong & Volker Nahrmann	2015	UMP Records
The Conference of the Birds (Original Score)	Randy Armstrong	2016	UMP Records
Together Apart	Randy Armstrong	2020	UMP Records
Together Again	Randy Armstrong	2021	UMP Records
Nhemamusasa	Randy Armstrong & WorldBeat Marimba	2021	UMP Records
Baba Mudiki	Randy Armstrong & WorldBeat Marimba	2022	UMP Records
Siyahamba	Randy Armstrong & WorldBeat Marimba	2022	UMP Records
Ziya Buya Africa	Randy Armstrong & WorldBeat Marimba	2023	UMP Records
Amaxoxo	Randy Armstrong & WorldBeat Marimba	2024	UMP Records
Echoes of Tomorrow	Randy Armstrong	2025	UMP Records

=== Compilations ===
Album	Artist or Band	Year	Label
Global Voyage	Do’ah	1988	Global Pacific
Enlightened Minds	Unu Mondo	1996	Global Pacific/Rhino
World Visions-The Rhythms	Unu Mondo	1996	Global Pacific/Navarre
Ageless Pathways	Unu Mondo	1996	Global Pacific/Navarre
Sound Healers (4 CD Boxset)	Randy Armstrong	1997	Relaxation Company
Healing Music Project Vol. 3	Randy Armstrong	2000	Relaxation Company
Journey to the Heart	Unu Mondo	2002	Domo Records
Music for the Spirit	Randy Armstrong	2002	Domo Records
Seacoast Guitarists - Vol. 1	Randy Armstrong	2002	Seacoast Guitar Society
Domo 10th Anniversary Collection	Randy Armstrong	2004	Domo Records
Tsunami Relief Project: A Musical Compilation	Randy Armstrong	2005	Atta Girl Records
Music for Yoga	Randy Armstrong	2007	Domo Records
Green Measures: Compilation / Artists for the Environment	Randy Armstrong	2008	Atta Girl Records

=== Collaborations/Accompanist ===
Album	Year	Label
Alleluia / Kyrie, On Wings of Song, Robert Gass Director	1987	Spring Hill Music
From the Goddess / O Great Spirit, On Wings of Song, Robert Gass Director	1988	Spring Hill Music
Heart of Perfect Wisdom, On Wings of Song, Robert Gass Director	1990	Spring Hill Music
Shri Ram, On Wings of Song, Robert Gass Director	1991	Spring Hill Music
Songs of Children, Phillips Exeter Concert Choir / Stephen Kushner, Director	1994	Phillips Exeter Academy
Drone Zone by Kay Garner	1996	Relaxation/Intuition
My Spirit Sang All Day, Phillips Exeter Concert Choir / Stephen Kushner, Director	1998	Phillips Exeter Academy
Chant, On Wings of Song, Robert Gass Director	1999	Spring Hill Music
Enchanted, On Wings of Song, Robert Gass Director	2000	Spring Hill Music
Dinner on the Diner – South Africa Disc 1, Phillips Exeter Concert Choir / Stephen Kushner, Director	2000	Ellipsis Arts
Awakening, On Wings of Song, Robert Gass Director	2003	Spring Hill Music
Sing On, Sing On, Sing On, Phillips Exeter Concert Choir / Stephen Kushner, Director	2003	Phillips Exeter Academy
Bliss - Om Namaha Shivaya, On Wings of Song, Robert Gass Director	2005	Spring Hill Music
O Hear My Song, Voices from the Heart / Joanne Connolly, Director	2005	Heart
Don’t Wanna Wait for Heaven, Voices from the Heart / Joanne Connolly, Director	2012	Heart
The Peacemakers, Carl Jenkins, Composer, Manchester Choral Society and Orchestra / Dan Perkins, Director	2012	MCS
On Watch the Stars, Con Tutti / Joanne Connolly, Director	2013	Con Tutti
Keep On Moving Forward, Con Tutti / Joanne Connolly, Director	2014	Con Tutti

=== Selected Film, Video, Television Scores ===
Film	Year	Comments
Mast Making for the King	1977	Documentary Film
Lotte Jacobi: A Film Portrait	1980	Documentary Film
New Hampshire Writers and the Small Town	1980	Documentary Film
Affluent Effluent	1980	Documentary Film
The White Mountains: A Cultural View	1981	Documentary Film
Emigration: A Franco American Experience	1981	Documentary Film
Dinner on the Dinner	2000	PBS Four-Part Series – South Africa / Scotland / Spain / Southeast Asia
A League of Our Own: NH and The American Craft Movement	2007	Documentary Film
The Tom Lantos Human Rights Award: The Dalai Lama	2009	Documentary Film
Telling the Story of Slavery: The New Yorker	2016	Produced by Vacationland Studios
9 Degrees	2019	Produced by Vacationland Studios/Tribeca Films/23andMe

=== Selected Theatre & Dance Scores ===
Production	Year	Theatre Company
Dance of the Kung Fu Master	1979	Piscataqua River Dance Company
Quartet Suite	1985	Pontine Theatre
Seven Mysteries of Life	1988	Touchstone Theatre
Correspondence of Desire	1994	Pontine Theatre
Journey to Heaven-The Shaker Way	1997	Pontine Theatre
Ananse the Spider Man	2005	Plymouth State University
Hamlet, Prince of Denmark	2009	NH Theatre Project
Macbeth	2010	Phillips Exeter Academy
The Mahabharata	2014	Phillips Exeter Academy
The Conference of the Birds	2016	Enacte Arts, Inc.
Soundwaves, The Passion of Noor Inayat Khan	2017	Enacte Arts, Inc.
The Clean House	2018	Threshold Stage Company
Shelter, A One Billion Rising Event	2018	Neoteric Dance Collaborative
Ayesha and the Fire Fish	2019	Enacte Arts, Inc.
Together Apart	2020	Phillips Exeter Academy
Choose Love	2022	Plymouth State University – NH State Council on the Arts
MACBETH	2025	Phillips Exeter Academy
