= Mentiras piadosas (Joaquín Sabina album) =

Mentiras Piadosas (Pious lies)

Studio album by Joaquín Sabina
- Released: 1990
- Studio: Cinearte Studios, Madrid
- Genre: Rock; hard rock; pop rock
- Length: 50:20
- Label: Ariola
- Producer: Joaquín Sabina, Pancho Varona Antonio García de Diego

Joaquín Sabina chronology
El hombre del traje gris (1988)	Mentiras Piadosas (Pious lies) (1990)	Física y química (1992)

Singles from Mentiras piadosas
- 1. "Eclipse de mar" Released: 1990; 2. "Pobre Cristina" Released: 1990; 3. "Con la frente marchita" Released: 1990; 4. "Con un par" Released: 1990

Mentiras piadosas (English: Pious lies) is the seventh studio album released by the Spanish singer-songwriter Joaquín Sabina which was released in 1990, two years

after his previous release. This album is considered by Sabina and by the sabiners, his fans as a transition album from his early career to his maturity as an artist.

== Background ==
After two enormously successful releases and some tours and TV appearances in Latin America, and one year after the birth of his older daughter Carmela, back in Spain the performer started working in his following album. The singer started combining his Rock to hard rock style of his previous releases with more careful and elegant lyrics. As usual, Sabina teamed up with his fellow companions Pancho Varona and Antonio García de Diego and the recording of the album started in the Cinearte studios of Madrid.

Sabina found the inspiration for this album in his long tours in Latin America, where he discovered new places, new friends, new collaborators, and also lived some stories that were present in the release. The performer also inspired himself in the political context of the first 1990's with events such as the fall of the iron curtain and the events that this fact triggered such as the fall of the Soviet Union, which were bad news for him because of his left wing ideology.

Some other songs of the album were inspired also in facts that happened in Spain during that time and some confidential stories.

== Style and production ==
Although the Rock music from the previous album still prevails, Sabina started incorporating more elaborated lyrics with some literary figures typical from the Spanish baroque era. The album starts with "Eclipse de mar" (Sea eclipse), which was released as the first single from the album. This is a soft but passionate ballad about a feeling that survives regardless of what happens in the world. One verse of the chorus of this song says "The newspaper didn't talk about you nor me" which clearly reflects the general spirit of this song.

The second song of the tracklist entitled "Pobre Cristina" (Poor Christina) was extracted as the second single from this album and is a more Rock song that talks about the life of an immensely rich, but at the same time unhappy woman with low self-esteem, who doesn't feel loved by anyone and who tries to find a boyfriend anywhere regardless of his social status.

The third single and arguably the most popular one of this album was the song with the title of "Con la frente marchita" (With a destroyed pride) in a reference to Carlos Gardel's homonymous song. This song, for which was recorded a promotional video, talks about a short relationship with an Argentine girl who lived in Madrid working as a street seller in El Rastro, but who eventually returned to her country leaving no trace.

The fourth single entitled "Con un par" (With a pair of balls), was not as popular as the previous one, but it was the most controversial one from this album, in fact it was also recorded a promotional video for this single. This song, arranged with Caribbean rhythms, tells the weird history of Dionisio Rodríguez Martín (better known as El Dioni) a security guard of a bank who found a van full of money. Taking advantage of a neglect of the driver, Dioni took the van and used all the money to escape to Rio de Janeiro, where he was detected because of his suspiciously ostentous lifestyle. Finally the former guard was arrested and extradited to Spain. When El Dioni realised that Sabina had composed a song about his story he got so angry that it is said he denounced the singer for it. As an interesting fact, the artwork for the cover of this single was drawn by the renowned cartoonist Forges.

== Tracklist ==
No.	Title	Length
1.	"Eclipse de mar (Sea eclipse)"	04:15
2.	"Pobre Cristina (Poor Christina)"	04:30
3.	"Y si amanece por fin (And if finally sun rises)"	04:38
4.	"El muro de Berlín (The Berlin wall)"	04:18
5.	"Mentiras piadosas (Pious lies)"	03:35
6.	"Con un par (With a pair of balls)"	05:14
7.	"Corre, dijo la tortuga (Run, said the turtle)"	04:12
8.	"Con la frente marchita (With a destroyed pride)"	05:01
9.	"Ataque de tos (Coughing Fit)"	04:03
10.	"Medias negras (Black socks)"	04:49
11.	"Ponme un trago más (Serve me one more drink)"	04:17
12.	"A ti que te lo haces (For you, the one who enjoys that way)"	04:17

== Reception ==
Mentiras Piadosas didn't enjoy the same success of the previous two albums, nevertheless, it did it well in the Spanish music chart and sold more than 300.000 copies.

== Versions of some songs ==
- One of the songs of this album entitled "Corre, dijo la tortuga" (Run, said the turtle) a song which talks about the hypocrisy and falseness of some people, was covered thirteen years later by the Mexican singer Julieta Venegas, whose version was included in "Entre todas las mujeres" (among all women) a tribute album dedicated to Sabina and released in 2003.
- The song "Con la frente marchita" was also covered, this time by the Argentine tango singer Adriana Varela, whose version was also included in the same tribute album dedicated to Sabina.
