= Dolor de garganta =

Studio album by Javier Krahe
- Released: 1999
- Length: 38:45
- Label: 18 Chulos

Javier Krahe chronology
Versos de tornillo (1997)	Dolor de garganta (1999)	Cábalas y cicatrices (2002)

Dolor de garganta is the eighth album released in 1999 by Javier Krahe. In 1998 Javier Krahe found the label 18 Chulos with Pepín Tre, Santiago Segura, el Gran Wyoming, Faemino and Pablo Carbonell, and this album is edited by it.

== Track listing ==
No.	Title	Length
1.	"Antípodas"
2.	"La perversa Leonor"
3.	"Los cinco sentidos"
4.	"Cuerpo de Melibea"
5.	"¡Por fin!"
6.	"Sonata de otoño"
7.	"Salomé"
8.	"Sra. Juez"
9.	"Dama de mis pensamientos"
10.	"Minimal de amor"
11.	"Carmiña"
12.	"La ley del mercado"
Total length:		38:45
