= Ryles Jazz Club =

Jazz club in Cambridge, Massachusetts, US

Coordinates: 42°22′23″N 71°6′1″W

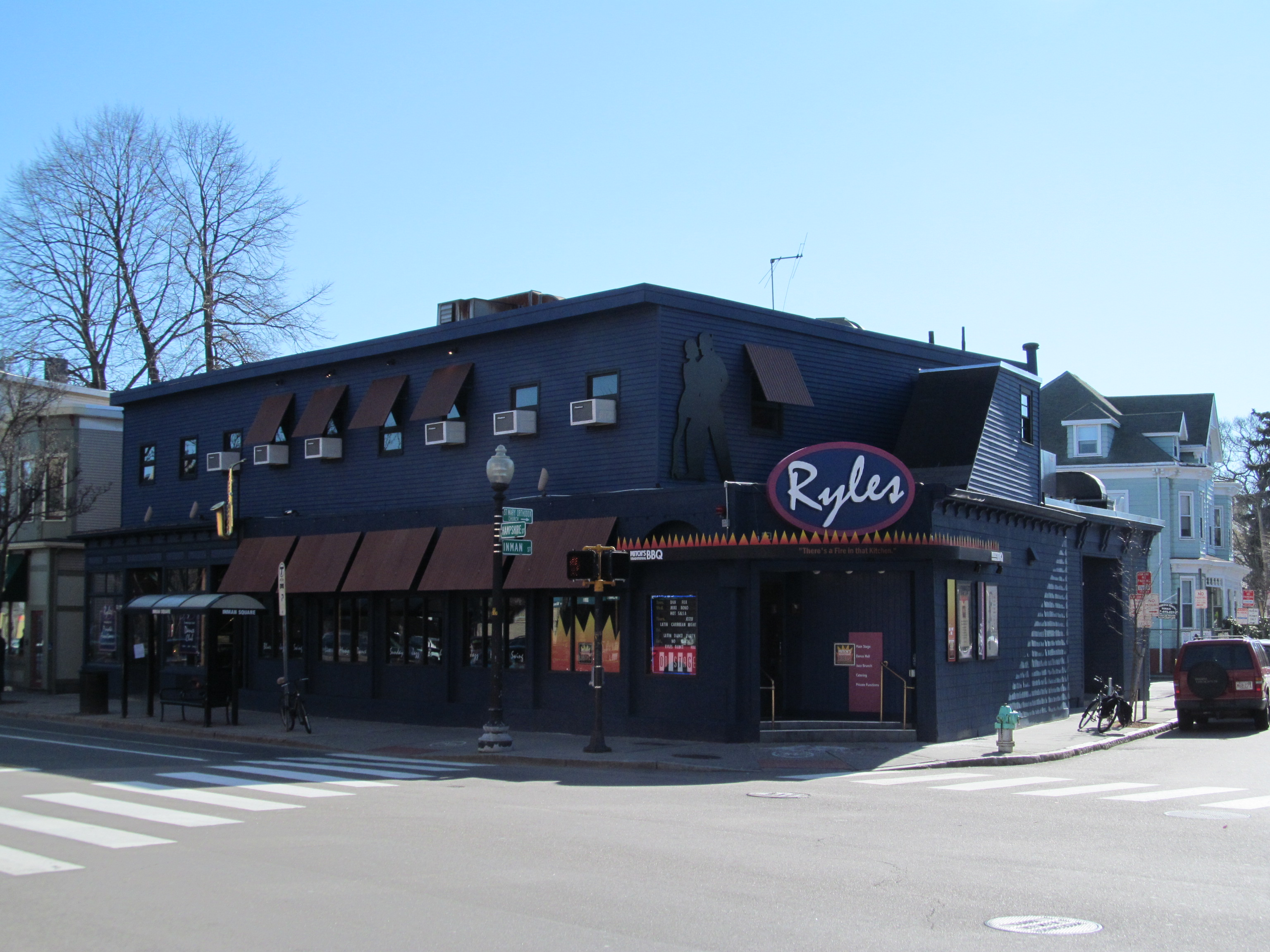
Ryles Jazz Club

Ryles Jazz Club was a jazz club located at 212 Hampshire Street, Cambridge, Massachusetts. Located in a former Italian restaurant, now painted black, it was the oldest jazz club in Cambridge and the second oldest in the Greater Boston area.

It featured a mixture of blues, jazz, R&B, world beat, and Latin in two rooms on two different floors. In recent decades it became well-noted for its Latin and Brazilian jazz music, featuring Brazilian music on Wednesday nights and salsa and merengue on Thursdays. On Sundays it featured a "jazz brunch" between 10 a.m. and 3 p.m. and the Ryles Jazz Club Orchestra from 4-7 p.m. Although mostly featuring local Boston talent, the club featured notables such as Pat Metheny, Robben Ford, Grover Washington Jr., Olga Román, Arturo Sandoval, McCoy Tyner, Maynard Ferguson, Jon Hendricks, Jon Faddis, Néstor Torres, Mose Allison, Fernando Holz Band, and Berklee jazz pianist and professor Ray Santisi was a regular performer at the club.

As of early 2018, Ryles has been put on the market, and had its last shows at the end of June 2018. The new landlord of the building owned a restaurant of its own in Inman Square and decided they would prefer a new tenant which did not compete for parking.
