= Javier Krahe =

Spanish singer (1944–2015)

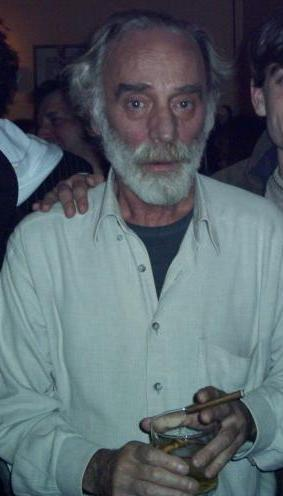
- Javier Krahe
- Born: Francisco Javier Krahe de Salas; 30 March 1944; Madrid, Spain
- Died: 12 July 2015 (aged 71); Zahara de los Atunes, Spain
- Occupations: Singer; songwriter; artist; writer
- Years active: 1980–2015
- Labels: CBS; Sony Music Entertainment; 18 Chulos; Lollipop
- Spouse: Annick Bloyard
- Children: Violante Krahe, Marcos Krahe

Francisco Javier Krahe de Salas (30 March 1944 – 12 July 2015) was a Spanish singer active from 1980.

== Biography ==
Krahe was born in distrito de Salamanca, Madrid. He studied at Colegio del Pilar, where he began his studies in business administration, but later dropped out to work in film as production assistant.

During his military service, he met his future wife, Annick, and traveled with her to Canada, where he started working as songwriter. He signed with the label Sony Music Entertainment. He was influenced by Georges Brassens' and Leonard Cohen's work. His brother Jorge provided music to his lyrics.

He later returned to Spain. Chicho Sánchez Ferlosio helped him to work in La Aurora, where he met Joaquín Sabina and Alberto Pérez. As a trio, they recorded La mandrágora. He also worked at TVE on the television show Si yo fuera presidente ("If I Were President").

He died of a heart attack on 12 July 2015 in Zahara de los Atunes, Cádiz.

== Discography ==
- Valle de lágrimas (1980)
- La mandrágora (with Joaquín Sabina and Alberto Pérez) (1981)
- Aparejo de fortuna (1984)
- Corral de cuernos (1985)
- Haz lo que quieras (1987)
- Elígeme (live) (1988)
- Sacrificio de dama (1993)
- Versos de tornillo (1997)
- Dolor de garganta (1999)
- Cábalas y cicatrices (live) (2002)
- ...Y todo es vanidad (Tribute to Javier Krahe) (2004)
- Cinturón negro de karaoke (2006)
- Querencias y extravíos (live) (2007)
- Toser y Cantar (2010)
- Las diez de últimas (2013)
- En el Café Central de Madrid (live CD + DVD) (2014)
