= Hotel dulce hotel =

Hotel, dulce hotel (Hotel, sweet hotel)

Studio album by Joaquín Sabina
- Released: 1987
- Studio: Eurosonic Studios, Madrid
- Genre: Pop rock; hard rock
- Length: 50:20
- Label: Ariola
- Producer: Jesús Gómez, Joaquín Sabina, Pancho Varona

Joaquín Sabina chronology
Joaquín Sabina y Viceversa en directo (1986)	Hotel, dulce hotel (Hotel, sweet hotel) (1987)	El hombre del traje gris (1988)

Singles from Juez y parte (Judge and side)
- 1. "Así estoy yo sin ti" Released: 1987; 2. "Pacto entre caballeros" Released: 1987; 3. "Que se llama soledad" Released: 1987

Hotel, dulce hotel (Hotel, Sweet Hotel) is the fifth studio album of the Spanish singer-songwriter Joaquín Sabina, released in 1987 one year after Joaquín Sabina y Viceversa en directo, his previous live album. This was his third release under Ariola.

== Background ==
After the successful tour and live album released one year before, in this fifth studio album, Sabina counted for the first time with the executive production of Pancho Varona, who had previously collaborated with him two years before in Juez y parte as a support musician. This personal and creative friendship also led to the creation of a society called Ripio S.A. in which many of their future productions would be registered. The album was recorded in the Eurosonic Studios of Madrid.

== Style and production ==
On this album, Sabina started exploring other type of emotions such as love or affection, a type of songs that was not present in his repertoire before. The result was a more intimate and sentimental work than the previous ones.

The first maxi single of this album was "Así estoy yo sin ti" (That's how I am without you), a song about the end of a relationship and the feelings of loneliness that this creates. Unexpectedly, this song turned into a great hit, to the point that a promotional video was recorded for it with the participation of some popular actresses such as Emma Suarez and Kiti Manver.

The second single was the hard rock hit entitled "Pacto entre caballeros" (Deal between gentlemen), which tells a weird, but true story in which Sabina is assaulted by three burglars, who after recognising his face, invite him to drink some beers in a bar. After having an unexpectedly good time, the incident ends with the performer promising to write a song about them.

The following single, "Que se llama soledad" (Whose name is loneliness), is another well known track of this album. It also explores feelings of loneliness and sorrow. One verse of this track compares the loneliness with an "unexpected lover" who arrives at home when she's not wanted. In this song, Sabina experiments with other rhythms and styles such as jazz and blues that were not present in his previous work.

Unlike all his previous works which had ten tracks, this one only has nine, making this album Sabina's shortest.

== Track listing ==
No.	Title	Length
1.	"Así estoy yo sin ti (That's how I am without you)"	05:06
2.	"Pacto entre caballeros (Deal between gentlemen)"	03:55
3.	"Que se llama soledad (Whose name is loneliness)"	04:48
4.	"Besos de judas (Judas Kisses)"	03:51
5.	"Oiga doctor!! (Hey doctor!!)"	03:21
6.	"Amores eternos (Eternal love)"	03:46
7.	"Mónica (Monique)"	03:53
8.	"Cuernos (Horns)"	03:57
9.	"Hotel, dulce hotel (Hotel, sweet hotel)"	04:22

== Reception ==
Hotel, dulce hotel became Sabina's most successful album, selling more than 400.000 copies in Spain. Thanks to this release, Sabina became a superstar and one of the most renowned singer-songwriters in Spain. Thanks to the success of this record, his popularity started rising in Latin America, where he started giving his first performances.
