= El hombre del traje gris =

El hombre del traje gris (The man in the grey suit)

Studio album by Joaquín Sabina
- Released: 1988
- Studios: Eurosonic Studios, Madrid
- Genres: Rock; hard rock; pop rock
- Length: 50:20
- Label: Ariola
- Producers: Joaquín Sabina, Pancho Varona; Antonio García de Diego Luis Fernández Soria

Joaquín Sabina chronology
| Hotel dulce hotel (1987) | El hombre del traje gris (The man in the grey suit) (1988) | Mentiras Piadosas (1990) |

Singles from El hombre del traje gris
- 1. "Eva tomando el sol" Released: 1988; 2. "Una de romanos" Released: 1988; 3. "¿Quién me ha robado el mes de abril?" Released: 1988; 4. "Rap del optimista" Released: 1989

El hombre del traje gris (The man in the grey suit), is the sixth studio album of the Spanish singer-songwriter Joaquín Sabina, released in 1988, one year after Hotel, dulce hotel, his previous studio release. This album was recorded in the Eurosonic studios of Madrid.

== Background ==
In this sixth studio album, Sabina counted on the executive production of his longtime friend Pancho Varona, who had also participated in the production of his previous record. Another collaborator who took part in the production of this album was Antonio García de Diego, who would also intervene in Sabina's future albums. After the smashing success of "Hotel dulce hotel", the performer started following the creative direction taken by that album and started writing songs more intensively. Pancho Varona and Sabina went to the Portuguese island of Madeira in order to find inspiration for his new songs, but disappointed by the general atmosphere in that place, which made them unable to start working, they decided to go to Las Palmas. There the production of this album started flowing and they returned to Madrid with the songs "Besos en la frente" (Kisses on the forehead) and "Eva tomando el sol" (Eva having a sunbath) already composed. The remaining songs on the recording were written in some dark Madrid bars that the singer has never revealed.

== Style and production ==
In "El hombre del traje gris", Joaquín Sabina started showing a darker and more nostalgic side, except from some exceptions, most of the songs reflect feelings of loneliness, sadness, languor and lethargy. A clear example of those feelings shown in this release is the first song extracted as maxi single, entitled "Eva tomando el sol" (Eva Sunbathing), a melancholic ballad in which Sabina remembers a brief love story during his exile years in London, a story in which the singer gives some details about their daily lives with some references to the Adan and Eva passage of the Bible.

The following single was the hit song "Una de romanos" (A film about Roman soldiers), a song that tells a personal story about a childhood romance inside a cinema hall while watching a film that was set in the Roman Empire. The popularity of this song was so high that, as happened with the previous album, it was recorded a promotional video.

The next maxi single was by far, the most popular track of this album, which had the title of "¿Quién me ha robado el mes de abril?" (Who has stolen the month of April?) a song where the feelings of sadness are even more intense. In fact, the singer describes, in this song, a landscape of desperation with some real stories that show the real feelings of the ones who have lost all their hopes.

The fourth single from this album was the song "Rap del optimista" (The rap of the optimistic guy). This song, which is the ending track of the album, had a much more cheerful tone in comparison with the rest of the tracklist. It talks about the Spanish music scene during the 1980s and the radical style changes from Rock music to the most mainstream pop that some singers and bands used to make in order to boost their sales.

As an interesting fact, some of the songs of this album were used in the soundtrack of the film "Sinatra", directed by Paco Betríu and starred by Alfredo Landa. Sabina also made a short cameo appearance in this film.

== Track listing ==
| No. | Title | Length |
|---|---|---|
| 1. | "Eva tomando el sol (Eva sunbathing)" | 05:47 |
| 2. | "Besos en la frente (Kisses on the forehead)" | 05:11 |
| 3. | "¿Quién me ha robado el mes de abril? (Who stole the month of April from me?)" | 04:57 |
| 4. | "Una de romanos (A film about ancient Romans)" | 04:49 |
| 5. | "Juegos de azar (Gambling)" | 03:23 |
| 6. | "Locos de atar (Crazy as hell)" | 03:58 |
| 7. | "Nacidos para perder (Born to lose)" | 03:48 |
| 8. | "Peligro de incendio (Fire hazard)" | 03:36 |
| 9. | "¡Al ladrón, al ladrón! (Catch that thief! Catch that thief!)" | 05:45 |
| 10. | "Cuando aprieta el frío "When it gets really cold"" | 03:54 |
| 11. | "Los perros del amanecer "The dogs of dawn"" | 04:14 |
| 12. | "Rap del optimista "The optimist's rap"" | 04:26 |

== Reception ==
El hombre del traje gris sold more than 85.000 copies one week after its release. The total sales of this album were even higher than the ones of his previous release to the point that it led to a successful tour un countries such as Mexico and Venezuela and Argentina.
