= Malas Compañías =

Malas Compañías (Bad companies)

Studio album by Joaquín Sabina
- Released: 1980
- Studio: Madrid
- Genre: Pop rock
- Length: 50:20
- Label: CBS
- Producer: Hilario Camacho Joaquín Sabina José Luis de Carlos Chicho Sánchez Ferlosio

Joaquín Sabina chronology
Inventario (1978)	Malas Compañías (Bad companies) (1980)	La mandrágora (1981)

Singles from Malas Compañías
- 1. "Calle melancolía" Released: 1978; 2. "Pongamos que hablo de Madrid" Released: 1978

"Malas Compañías" (Bad companies) is the second studio album of the Spanish singer-songwriter Joaquín Sabina, which was released under CBS, in 1980. Sabina started working in this new album short after the release of his previous album, Inventario, two years before.

== Background ==
After leaving Movieplay, his former record label and signing with CBS, Sabina started departing from the vindictive tone of the songs of his previous album and started focusing on other themes and other stories that would be part of the singer's personal style. When the recording of this album started in Madrid, the performer began collaborating with new producers and artists such as José Luis de Carlos, the renowned Hilario Camacho and José Antonio Romero.

== Style ==
The lyrics of Joaquín Sabina, in this second album, started focusing on usual stories and personal feelings. The opening track and the first maxi single from this album was "Calle melancolía" (Melancholy street), a song which revolves about feelings of loneliness and depression. Although this song would have a moderate success during that time, it later turned into one of the most widely remembered songs of Sabina's trajectory. The following track of this album, which had the title of "Que demasiao" (Really too much?) told the sad story and troubled life of a criminal known as "El Jaro".

In general, musically, the melodical sounds would prevail in this album, such is the main characteristic of the following maxi single and probably the most popular one of this release, "Pongamos que hablo de Madrid" (Let's say I'm talking about Madrid) a song that was originally written by Sabina but which had been previously recorded by Antonio Flores, whose version reached the number one position of the Los 40 Principales chart. The B side of that Maxi single was the song "Círculos viciosos" (Vicious circles) a more cheerful rhumba composed by Chicho Sánchez Ferlosio.

The melodical sounds of this album continue until the ending track entitled "Pasándolo bien" (having a good time), which had a more accelerated rhythm with less presence of acoustic instruments and more electronic vibes.

== Track listing ==
No.	Title	Length
1.	"Calle melancolía (Melancholy street)"	04:26
2.	"Que demasiao (Really too much?)"	03:30
3.	"Carguen, apunten, fuego!!! (Charge, point, fire!!!)"	03:42
4.	"Gulliver"	03:48
5.	"Círculos viciosos (Vicious circles)"	04:02
6.	"Pongamos que hablo de Madrid (Let's say I'm talking about Madrid)"	04:05
7.	"Manual para héroes o canallas (Instructions for heroes or wrongdoers)"	03:11
8.	"Bruja (Witch)"	04:27
9.	"Mi amigo Satán (My friend Satan)"	04:17
10.	"Pasándolo bien (Having a good time)"	02:41

== Reception ==
Unlike "Inventario", his previous release that only sold one thousand copies, Malas Compañías received a better welcome both critically and commercially. Thanks to this album and to the moderate success of the two maxi singles extracted from it, the performer started gaining media exposure. Eight years after the release of this album, CBS re-released it due to Sabina's growing popularity.
