= Joaquín Sabina =

Spanish musician (born 1949)

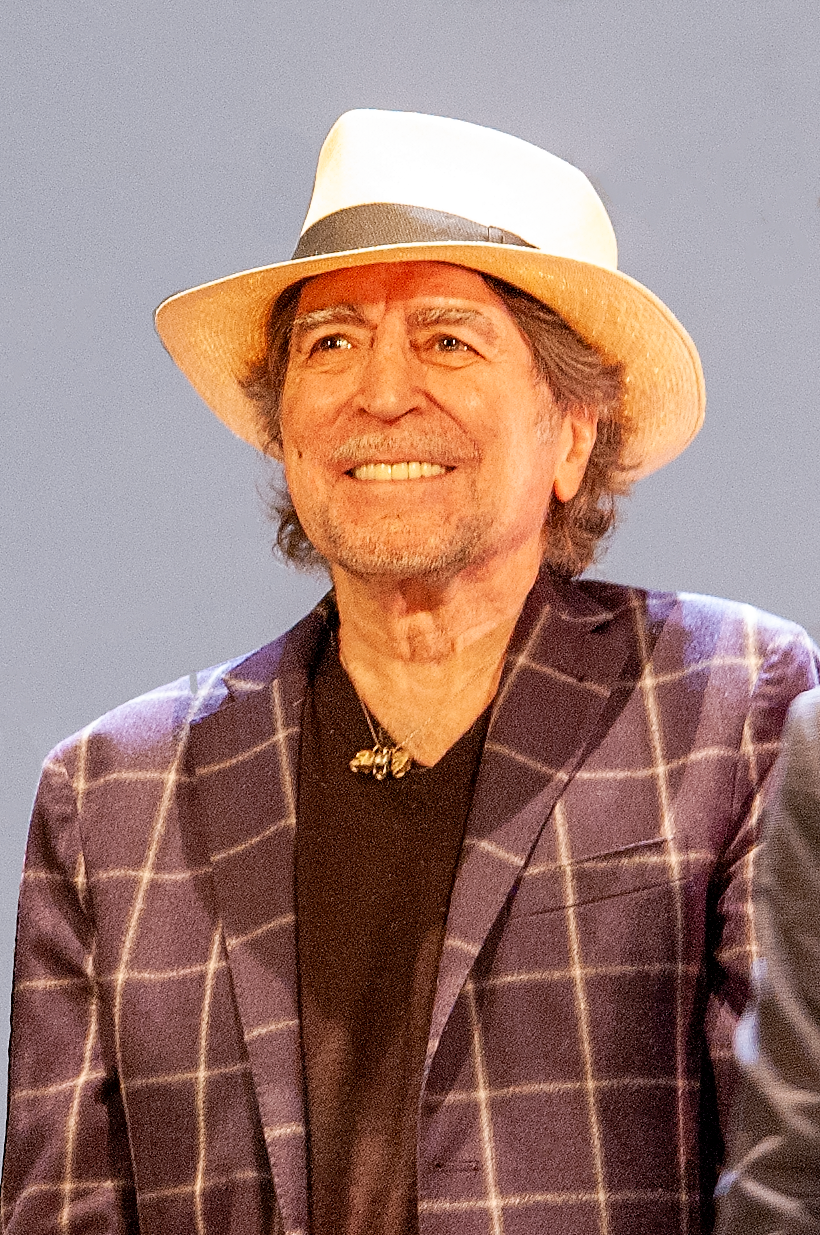
- Born: Joaquín Ramón Martínez Sabina; 12 February 1949 (age 77); Úbeda, Jaén, Spain
- Occupations: Musician; singer; composer; poet
- Years active: 1978–2025
- Spouse: Jimena Coronado (m. 2020)
- Musical career
- Genres: Latin; rock; trova
- Instruments: Vocals; guitar
- Labels: Movieplay (1978); CBS (1980–1985); BMG Ariola Spain (1985–2012); Sony Music Spain (2012–present)
- Website: www.jsabina.com (in Spanish)

Signature
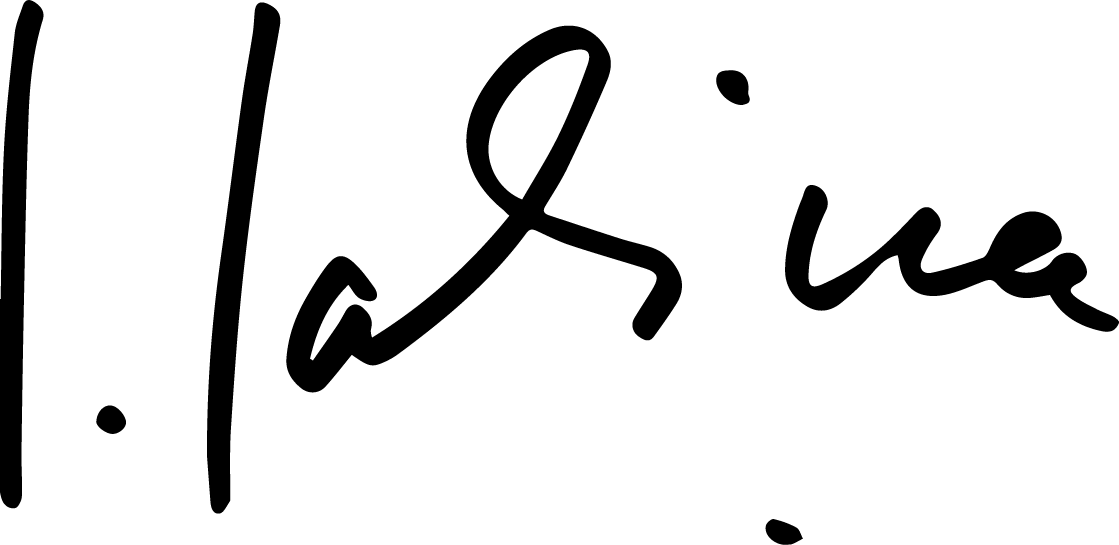

Joaquín Ramón Martínez Sabina (born 12 February 1949) is a Spanish musician, singer, composer, and poet. His songs usually treat love, heartbreaks and society with significant use of literary figures as in the baroque-literature style.

He has released fourteen studio albums, two live albums, and three compilation albums. Some of his best-known songs are "Calle Melancolía" ("Melancholy street"), "19 días y 500 noches" ("19 days and 500 nights"),"¿Quién me ha robado el mes de Abril?" ("Who stole the month of April from me?"), "Pongamos que hablo de Madrid" ("Lets say I'm talking about Madrid"), "Y sin embargo" ("However"), "Contigo" ("With you") or "Peces de ciudad" ("City fish")

He performed both solo and with a group for his live albums, performing with Javier Krahe and Alberto Pérez in La mandrágora, the group Viceversa in a 1986 concert, and with Joan Manuel Serrat in Dos pájaros de un tiro (Two birds with one stone).

Sabina suffered a stroke in 2001 and although he physically recovered, he entered a deep depression which resulted in a four-year-long concert hiatus. He recovered and released his eighteenth album, Alivio de Luto, in November 2005 and in 2009 he released his album, Vinagre y rosas. In 2012 he released his latest album in collaboration with Joan Manuel Serrat: La Orquesta Del Titanic.

On June 29, 2020, Sabina married Jimena Coronado in a private ceremony in Madrid

== Biography and career ==
=== Early years ===
Joaquín Sabina was born in Úbeda, in the Province of Jaén. He is the second son of Adela Sabina del Campo and Jerónimo Martínez Gallego. His father was a policeman. He attended a Carmelite primary school and he started writing his first poems and composing music at the age of 14. He was part of a band called Merry Youngs which imitated singers such as Elvis Presley, Chuck Berry and Little Richard, as well as many others.

He attended a high school run by the Salesians of Don Bosco and during this period he began reading works by Fray Luis de León, Jorge Manrique, José Hierro, Marcel Proust, James Joyce and Herbert Marcuse.

After completing high school, his father wanted him to follow in his footsteps and become a police officer but he refused, saying that he preferred the guitar. In his song "La del pirata cojo" he says he fantasizes about living different lives, but he would not even joke about becoming a police officer.

=== Exile in London ===
He then enrolled in the University of Granada, reading philology in the faculty. There, he read the poetry of Pablo Neruda and César Vallejo. Sabina lived at first with a woman called Lesley and started to prepare his thesis.

His revolutionary ideology led him to be related to anti-fascist groups. In 1970, he began collaborating with the magazine Poesía 70, sharing pages with Carlos Cano and Luis Eduardo Aute; he then left the university, going into exile in London using a fake passport under the name Mariano Zugasti, to avoid persecution from Francisco Franco's government after throwing a Molotov cocktail into a government building. That same year, his father received an order to arrest Sabina due to his anti-Franco ideals.

In 1975, Sabina started writing songs and singing at local bars. In a local bar called "Mexicano-Taverna" Sabina performed in the presence of George Harrison, who was celebrating his birthday. The ex-Beatle then gave Sabina a five-pound note as tip, which Sabina still preserves to this day. When Franco's dictatorship ended in 1975, Sabina returned to Spain and joined the army but, feeling imprisoned, he married to be able to sleep outside the barracks.

=== After the return ===
Sabina's first album, Inventario (Inventory) was released in 1978 by a small label Movieplay. He describes this album "as his own version of death metal", but the album largely went unnoticed. Afterwards, he moved to the powerful CBS (today Sony) and released Malas Compañías (Bad Companies). This album gave Sabina his first number-one hit single "Pongamos que hablo de Madrid" (Let's say I'm talking about Madrid), and the artist attained wide recognition. He released a live album called La mandrágora (The Mandrake), sharing the spotlight with bandmates Javier Krahe and Alberto Pérez. The trio enjoyed great popularity due to their participation in a TV program. La Mandrágora was controversial due to the racy and political content of the lyrics.

Sabina released his third album Ruleta Rusa (Russian Roulette) in 1984. In this album the singer evolved from the typical singer-songwriter style to Rock music with a harder sound and with presence of new instruments such as electric guitars. One of the most popular songs of this album was "Pisa el acelerador" (Step on the accelerator), which was the first maxi single of this album.

=== Success ===
In 1985 Sabina left CBS and released, this time under Ariola, Juez y Parte (Judge and Side) his fourth studio album in which he teamed up with the band Viceversa, which was led by Pancho Varona, who would turn into one of his closest friends and producer of many of Sabina's future albums. In this release, which shows a more modern production with the use of synthesisers and keyboards, it was included another popular song entitled "Princesa" (Princess), arguably the most popular one of this release.

His political views led him to take part in the anti-NATO movement. He later released Joaquín Sabina y Viceversa en directo, his first live album, which turned definitely into his commercial breakthrough. This album which was recorded in the Salamanca theatre in Madrid, the singer collaborated with other singers such as Javier Krahe, Javier Gurruchaga, and Luis Eduardo Aute amongst others.

In 1987 Sabina released his fifth studio album, Hotel, Dulce Hotel (Hotel, Sweet Hotel), which sold a large number of records in Spain (400,000 copies). One of the most popular songs of this record was the track "Así estoy yo sin ti" (That's how I am without you) for which was released a promotional video, the first one of his musical career. That success led to his next album El Hombre del Traje Gris (The Man in the Gray Suit), in which he would count with Antonio García de Diego, a new collaborator and also another of his fellow friends. After releasing this album, Sabina undertook a successful tour in Latin America. This record was followed by the release of Mentiras Piadosas (White Lies) in 1990.

Two years later, in 1992, the performer reached a new sales record with the release of Física y Química (Physics and Chemistry), which sold more than one million copies mainly thanks to the smash hit "Y nos dieron las diez" (We went on till ten o'clock) a song with strong Mexican traditional flavour that tells the story of a summer affair. This song received such a warm welcome that has been covered by many Latin American singers. The unprecedented success led the singer to another successful tour to the Americas.

His later albums Esta boca es mía (literally, "This Mouth is Mine", a Spanish idiom meaning "I'll speak my peace"), Yo, mi, me, contigo (I, my, me, with you) and 19 Días y 500 Noches (19 Days and 500 Nights), won him wider recognition and multiple platinum albums.

After recovering from a stroke, he returned to the stage in 2002 with Dímelo en la Calle (Tell Me on the Street or Dare to Say That Outside). He later released a double album called Diario de un peatón (A Pedestrian's Diary), which included both his previous album and 12 new songs, along with a book illustrated by him.

In 2005 Sabina released a new record Alivio de luto (Relief from Mourning). The album release was accompanied by a DVD that includes interviews, music videos, acoustic versions of the songs, and home-made recordings.

In 2007, he went on tour with Spanish singer Joan Manuel Serrat, called Dos Pájaros de un Tiro (Two Birds with One Stone) and they recorded a CD of this tour, which includes the DVD of the concert and a documentary.

In 2009, he received the prize of the city of Madrid from the mayor Alberto Ruiz Gallardón, who said that he was one of the most important people who had given a good image to the city. That year, he published his 15th studio album, Vinagre y Rosas (Vinegar and Roses), an album in which he collaborated with his producers Pancho Varona and Antonio García de Diego, and with the band Pereza. The first single from the album was the song "Tiramisu de limón" ("Lemon Tiramisu"), sung with Ruben and Leiva, the members of Pereza. For the promotional video, he collaborated with the actress and singer Mónica Molina. Finally the album was released on 14 December, entering directly at the top of the Spanish album chart.

In 2022, the documentary Sintiéndolo mucho (I am very sorry or, literally, Really Feeling It) premiered at the San Sebastián Film Festival, a film directed by Spanish director Fernando León de Aranoa in which the former member of the band Pereza, Leiva, collaborates as composer of the soundtrack. It is an intimate documentary in which León de Aranoa shows us Joaquín Sabina in different aspects of his daily life, with recordings made during several years of monitoring the artist from Jaén and which shows us hidden aspects of his biography. In it, friends appear gathered at the singer-songwriter's apartment or images of his tour through Mexico.

== Style ==
Some examples of his baroque style songwriting with a large metaphoric usage:

From "Calle melancolía"

Vivo en el número siete
calle melancolía
quiero mudarme hace años
al barrio de la alegría
pero siempre que lo intento
ha salido ya el tranvía
en la escalera me siento
a silbar mi melodía

Translation:

I live at number seven
melancholia street
for years I've been wanting to move
to the happiness neighborhood
but every time I try
the tram has already left
I sit in the stairs
and whistle my melody

From "19 días y 500 noches

Me abandonó
Como se abandonan los zapatos viejos
Destrozó el cristal de mis gafas de lejos
Sacó del espejo su vivo retrato
[...]
Tanto la quería
que tardé en aprender a olvidarla
diecinueve días
y quinientas noches

Translation:

She abandoned me
As old shoes are abandoned
She broke the glass of my distance glasses
She removed from the mirror her live portrait
[...]
I loved her so much
that to learn to forget her it took me
nineteen days
and five hundred nights

From "Contigo"

Yo no quiero saber por qué lo hiciste
Yo no quiero contigo ni sin ti
Lo que yo quiero, muchacha de ojos tristes
Es que mueras por mí

Y morirme contigo si te matas
Y matarme contigo si te mueres
Porque el amor cuando no muere mata
Porque amores que matan nunca mueren

Translation:

I don't want to know why you did it
I don't want with or without you
what I want, girl with sad eyes
is that you die for me

And dying with you if you kill yourself
and killing myself with you if you die
because when love doesn't die it kills
because loves that kill never die.

From "Barbi superstar"

Al infierno se va por atajos, jeringas, recetas
ayer, hecha un pingajo me dijo, en el tigre de un bar
"¿dónde está la canción que me hiciste cuando eras poeta?
Terminaba tan triste que nunca la pude empezar"
Por esos labios, que sabían a puchero de pensiones inmundas
Habría matado yo que cuando muero ya nunca es por amor

Translation:

You go to hell by taking shortcuts, syringes and prescriptions
yesterday, being a mess, she told me in a pub's toilet
"Where is the song you wrote me when you were a poet?
the ending was so sad that I never could start reading it (the song)"
For these lips, that tasted like filthy hostels' soup
I would've killed, now that when I die it's never because of love

== Discography ==
=== Studio albums ===
- Inventario (Inventory) (1978)
- Malas Compañías (Bad Companies) (1980)
- Ruleta Rusa (Russian Roulette) (1984)
- Juez y parte (1985) (Judge And Side), with Viceversa.
- Hotel, dulce hotel (Hotel, Sweet Hotel) (1987)
- El hombre del traje gris (The Man in the Gray Suit) (1988)
- Mentiras piadosas (White Lies) (1990)
- Física y química (Physics and Chemistry) (1992)
- Esta boca es mía (This Mouth is Mine) (1994)
- Yo, mi, me, contigo (I, my, me, with you) (1996)
- Enemigos íntimos (Intimate Enemies) (1998), with Fito Páez.
- 19 días y 500 noches (19 Days and 500 Nights) (1999)
- Dímelo en la calle (Tell me on the Street) (2002)
- Diario de un peatón (Diary of a Pedestrian) (2003)
- Alivio de luto (Mourning Relief) (2005)
- Vinagre y rosas (Vinegar and Roses) (2009)
- La orquesta del Titanic (The Titanic's Orchestra) (2012), with Joan Manuel Serrat
- Lo niego todo (I Deny Everything) (2017)

=== Live albums ===
- La mandrágora (The Mandrake) (1981)
- Joaquín Sabina y Viceversa en directo (Joaquín Sabina and Viceversa live) (1986)
- Nos sobran los motivos (We have more than enough reasons, also a pun on We don't have enough reasons) (2000)
- Dos pájaros de un tiro (Two Birds With One Stone) (2007), with Joan Manuel Serrat

=== Compilation albums ===
- Pongamos que Hablo de Madrid (1987)
- Punto... (Period...1980–1990) (2006)
- ...Y seguido (...And Followed 1990–2005) (2006)

=== Tribute albums ===
- Dónde más duele (Where it hurts the most) (2002), Cover album of María Jimenez with Sabina's songs.
- Entre todas las mujeres (Between all women) (2003) Cover album of Sabina's songs sung by 12 female artists.
- La Habana canta a Sabina (Habana sings to Sabina) (2011) Cover album of Sabina's songs sung by Cuban artists.
- Más de cien mentiras. El musical (More than one hundred lies) (2011) Cover album of Sabina's songs sung in the homonymous musical.
- Ni tan joven ni tan viejo (Not so young nor so old) (2020) Cover album of Sabina's songs sung by various artists.

== Books ==
- Memorias del exilio (Memories from exile) (1976).
- De lo contado y sus márgenes (Of what has been told and its borders) (1986).
- El hombre del traje gris (Partitures of the 8th album) (1989).
- Perdonen la tristeza (Forgive the sadness) (2000). Written by Joaquín Sabina and Javier Mendez Flores.
- Ciento volando de catorce (A hundred of fourteen in the bush) (2001).
- Con buena letra (With good handwriting) (2002). Compilation of lyrics.
- Esta boca es mía (This mouth is mine) (2005). Compilation of satirical poems published in the weekly magazine Interviú.
- Con buena letra II (With good handwriting II) (2005). Compilation of lyrics.
- Sabina en carne viva, yo también se jugarme la boca (2006). Written by Joaquín Sabina and Javier Mendez Flores.
- Esta boca sigue siendo mía (This mouth is still mine) (2007). Compilation of satirical poems published in the weekly magazine Interviú.
- A vuelta de correo (By return mail) (2007). Compilation of the correspondence between Joaquín Sabina and other personalities.
- Prologue for the book "Versos bipolares y otras criaturas luminiscentes", Estefanía Muñiz (2009).
- Con buena letra III (With good handwriting III) (2010).
- El grito en el suelo (The scream on the ground) (2012). Compilation of poems released by the newspaper Público.
- Muy personal (Very personal) (2013). Compilation of drawings, started poems and unfinished songs.
- Garagatos (2016). Art book of paintings and drawings.

== Awards and achievements ==
- Medal of Andalusia (1989).
- Ondas Award for the best Spanish artist (1999).
- Ondas Award for the best song: 19 días y 500 noches (1999).
- Golden medal for the merit of Fine Arts (2000).
- Golden medal of the city of Madrid (2009).
- Favourite son medal of Úbeda (2017).
- Latin Grammy Lifetime Achievement Award (2021).

== See also ==
- List of best-selling Latin music artists
