= La mandrágora (album) =

La Mandrágora (The mandrake)

Live album by Joaquín Sabina, Javier Krahe and Alberto Pérez
- Released: 1981
- Studio: Mastered in Scorpio Studios, Madrid
- Genre: Pop rock; Rock Music; Singer-songwriter
- Length: 50:20
- Label: CBS
- Producer: Jorge Álvarez Joaquín Sabina José Luis de Carlos

Joaquín Sabina, Javier Krahe and Alberto Pérez chronology
Malas Compañías, and Valle de lágrimas (1980)	La Mandrágora (The mandrake) (1981)	Ruleta Rusa, Aparejo de fortuna and Amar y vivir (1984)

La mandrágora (The mandrake) is the first live album of the Spanish singer-songwriters Joaquín Sabina, Javier Krahe and Alberto Pérez, which was recorded live and released by CBS in 1981.

== Background ==
Sabina, Krahe and Alberto Pérez used to perform together in the basement of a bar called "La mandrágora" (The mandrake) located in the La Latina neighbourhood of downtown Madrid.

By the time this album was recorded, Javier Krahe and Alberto Pérez were already known in the local musical scene while Sabina was still virtually unknown by for the large audience. In this Album, Krahe admitted his admiration for the songs of the French singer-songwriter Georges Brassens, of whom he covers into Spanish some of his well known songs such as "Marieta" or "La tormenta". Joaquín Sabina, performed some of his best known songs such as "Pongamos que hablo de Madrid" (Let's say I'm taling about Madrid) and "Pasándolo bien" (Having a good time) amongst others. Alberto Pérez performed in the album his best known songs and some comical ones such as "Un santo varón" (A saint man).

== Track listing ==
No.	Title	Length
1.	"Marieta (By Javier Krahe)"	02:56
2.	"Un burdo rumor (By Javier Krahe)"	03:36
3.	"Pongamos que hablo de Madrid (By Joaquín Sabina)"	03:57
4.	"Pasándolo bien (By Joaquín Sabina)"	03:27
5.	"El cormosoma (By Javier Krahe)"	03:09
6.	"Un santo varón (By Alberto Pérez)"	03:38
7.	"Mi ovejita Lucera (By Alberto Pérez and Joaquín Sabina)"	06:06
8.	"Villatripas (By Javier Krahe and Alberto Pérez)"	04:24
9.	"La tormenta (By Alberto Pérez)"	04:46
10.	"Adivina adivinanza (By Joaquín Sabina)"	05:16
11.	"Nos ocupamos del mar (By Alberto Pérez)"	03:05
12.	"La hoguera (By Javier Krahe)"	04:17
13.	"Círculos viciosos (By Joaquín Sabina and Alberto Pérez)"	05:09
