= 19 días y 500 noches =

Studio album by Joaquín Sabina
- Released: 1999
- Length: 74 minutes
- Label: BMG, Ariola
- Producer: Alejo Stivel

Joaquín Sabina chronology
Enemigos íntimos (1998)	19 días y 500 noches (1999)	Nos sobran los motivos (2000)

19 días y 500 noches ("19 days and 500 nights") is an album by Spanish singer-songwriter Joaquín Sabina. It was released in 1999 on the BMG and Ariola labels. In 2015, it was selected by Billboard magazine as one of the "50 Essential Latin Albums of the Last 50 Years".

== Track listing ==
1. "Ahora que..." [6:49]
2. "19 días y 500 noches" [4:45]
3. "Barbi Superestar" [6:37]
4. "Una canción para La Magdalena" [4:15]
5. "Dieguitos Y Mafaldas" [5:35]
6. "A mis cuarenta y diez" [7:11]
7. "El caso de la rubia platino" [4:50]
8. "Donde habita el olvido" [3:32]
9. "Cerrado por derribo" [4:37]
10. "Pero qué hermosas eran" [7:29]
11. "De purísima y oro" [4:52]
12. "Como te digo una 'co' te digo la 'o'" [8:41]
13. "Noches de boda" (duet with Chavela Vargas) [4:42]

Bonus tracks on Argentine release

1. "Nos sobran los motivos" [4:33]
2. "La Biblia y el calefón" [3:02]

=== Sales ===
Region	Certification	Certified units/sales
Spain	—	500,000
Summaries
Latin America	—	200,000

== See also ==
- 19 días y 500 noches (Spanish Wikipedia)
