= Ruleta Rusa =

Ruleta Rusa (Russian Roulette)

Studio album by Joaquín Sabina
- Released: 1984
- Studio: Madrid
- Genre: Pop rock; Rock
- Length: 50:20
- Label: CBS
- Producer: Jorge Álvarez Joaquín Sabina José Luis de Carlos

Joaquín Sabina chronology
La mandrágora (1981)	Ruleta Rusa (Russian Roulette) (1984)	Juez y parte (1985)

Singles from Ruleta rusa (Russian roulette)
- 1. "Pisa el acelerador" Released: 1984; 2. "Eh, Sabina!!!" Released: 1984; 3. "Telespañolito" Released: 1984

Ruleta Rusa (Russian roulette) is the third studio album of the Spanish singer-songwriter Joaquín Sabina, released under the label CBS in 1984, three years later after his previous release.

== Background ==
Ruleta Rusa was expected to be released some years before its final release date, unfortunately the launch of the album was delayed because of the lack of creative connexion between Sabina and Jorge Álvarez, who used to be his producer. Álvared was so shocked when he heard Sabina's new songs that he broke the tape. This disagreement came because of Sabina's abrupt change of style to Rock Music. Despite this fact, Sabina in the end managed to convince his producer to recover some of the songs. Finally the album came to light in 1984.

== Style ==
The evident transition to rock music is the main feature of this album, a transition considered as risky by many musical critics. The performer left definitely behind his singer-songwriter traditional image and turned to rock music including more musical instruments such as electric guitars and hard drums. Although his lyrics, as happened with his previous album, reflected his personal feelings and day-to-day stories, they were transmitted in a very different way, with much catchier refrains in most of the songs. The opening track, entitled "Ocupen su localidad" (Occupy your seat) is a clear example of that change.

The first maxi single extracted from this album was "Pisa el acelerador" (Step on the accelerator), a song in which Sabina vindicated his philosophy of life; to live to the limit without taking into account what others say. Such is the theme of the second single, entitled "Eh, Sabina!!" (Hey Sabina!!), in which the singer textually says that he won't pay attention to anyone who tells him to be careful with his lifestyle. The following single was the song "Telespañolito" (TV little Spaniard) a song that talked about the TV and entertainment programmes during the 1980s in Spain. "Juana la loca" (Juana the crazy girl), which is the B side of this third and last single was arguably the most remembered track of the whole album, a song which talked about the vibrant nightlife of Madrid through the story of an apparently formal office worker who turns out to work as a drag queen at night.

Ruleta Rusa also had a place for a love song entitled "Caballo de cartón" (Paperboard horse) which talks about a relationship threatened by the daily routine.

== Track listing ==
No.	Title	Length
1.	"Ocupen su localidad (Occupy your seat)"	03:24
2.	"Telespañolito (TV little Spaniard)"	05:46
3.	"Caballo de cartón (Paperboard horse)"	04:14
4.	"Guerra mundial (World war)"	03:50
5.	"Negra noche (Black night)"	04:38
6.	"Eh, Sabina!! (Hey, Sabina!!)"	03:39
7.	"Juana la loca (Juana the crazy girl)"	05:35
8.	"Ring, Ring, Ring"	04:06
9.	"Pisa el acelerador (Step on the accelerator)"	03:38
10.	"Por el tunel (By the tunnel)"	05:08
