= Juez y parte =

Juez y parte (Judge and side)

Studio album by Joaquín Sabina
- Released: 1985
- Studio: Doblewtronics studio, Madrid
- Genre: Pop rock; Rock Music; Singer-songwriter; hard rock
- Length: 50:20
- Label: Ariola
- Producer: Jesús Gómez, Joaquín Sabina, Pancho Varona

Joaquín Sabina chronology
Ruleta Rusa (1984)	Juez y parte (Judge and side) (1985)	Joaquín Sabina y Viceversa en directo (1986)

Singles from Juez y parte (Judge and side)
- 1. "Whisky sin soda" Released: 1985; 2. "Rebajas de enero" Released: 1985; 3. "Incompatibilidad de carateres" Released: 1985

Juez y parte (Judge and side) is the fourth studio album of the Spanish singer-songwriter Joaquín Sabina, released in 1985, only one year after Ruleta Rusa, his previous record. In this album the performer teamed up with the band Viceversa, which was led by Pancho Varona, who would turn into a close friend and also into one of the producers of Sabina's following albums. This is also the very first release of Joaquín Sabina under Ariola, his new record label.

== Background ==
Joaquín Sabina, seeking more creative freedom, left CBS, his former record label and signed a contract with Ariola, the company in which the singer would release his subsequent records. Sabina also started looking for a more modern production effort and that's how he contacted with Pancho Varona and Viceversa. During the recording of this album in Madrid, the singer thought about many possible titles for this album: some of them were "Descaradamente personal" (Outrageously personal) or "Primera persona del singular" (First person of singular), but finally, the performer selected "Juez y parte" as the final title. According to his words: "Judge because I tell and give my opinion about what I see, and side, because I'm in all what I see."

== Style and production ==
Under the executive production of Jesús Gómez and with the support of Pancho Varona and his band, Joaquín Sabina went on developing his Rock & Roll style of his previous album, this time with a more sophisticated and elaborated production using new electronic instruments such a synthesisers and keyboards apart from electric guitars. The opening track of this album and also the first maxi single was "Whisky sin soda" (Whisky without soda), and optimistic song that shares the message of some of his previous single releases about living to the limit. The following single release of this album was the song "Rebajas de enero" (January sales), which tells an ordinary love story similar to any other. A very different subject-matter has the third single entitled "Incompatibilidad de caracteres" (Character incompatibility), which addresses the problem of the inability to agree with life companions.

Although those three singles were moderately successful, the most popular track from Juez y parte was, by far, a song called "Princesa" (Princess), a sad story about a pure hearted woman, who could have been happy, but who lost everything due to poor judgement, addictions and excesses. Many of Sabina's fans consider this song to be the hymn that started the performer's rise to the stardom.

Another worth of note song is "Balada de tolito" (Tolito's ballad), a song that tells the story of a street entertainer who used to walk around the streets of Madrid. The sad tone of this track reflects the hard life and uncertain future of street artists. Tolito's story was shown in the RTVE program "Vivir cada día" (To live everyday) in a report in which Sabina appeared singing this song.

== Track listing ==
No.	Title	Length
1.	"Whisky sin soda (Whisky without soda)"	04:29
2.	"Cuando era más joven (When I was younger)"	04:31
3.	"Ciudadano cero (Zero citizen)"	05:00
4.	"El joven aprendiz de pintor (The young painter learner)"	04:05
5.	"Rebajas de enero (January sales)"	03:58
6.	"Kung Fu"	04:01
7.	"Balada de Tolito (Tolito's ballad)"	04:55
8.	"Incompatibilidad de caracteres (Character incompatibility)"	03:25
9.	"Princesa (Princess)"	04:04
10.	"Quédate a dormir (Stay here to sleep)"	05:16

== Reception ==
Juez y parte had a better critical and commercial response than Sabina's previous albums due to the production effort and the message of the lyrics.
