= Chicho Sánchez Ferlosio =

Spanish singer-songwriter and poet (1940–2003)

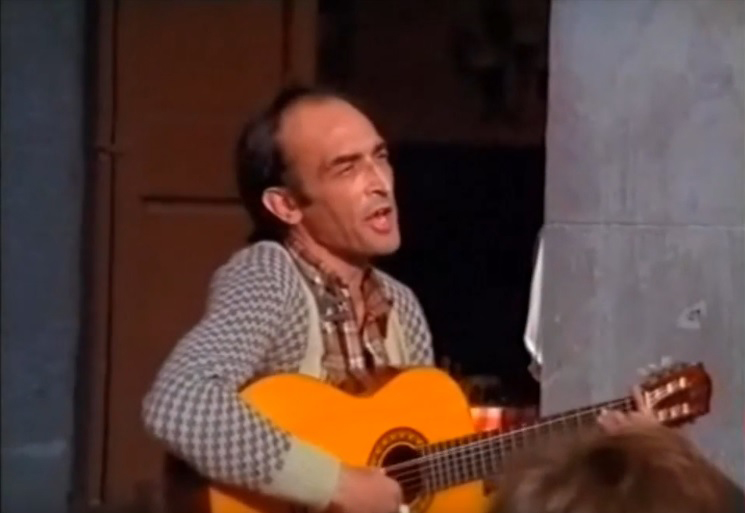

Background information
- Born: José Antonio Sánchez Ferlosio; 8 April 1940; Madrid, Spain
- Died: 30 June 2003 (aged 63) Madrid, Spain
- Genres: Spanish folk
- Occupation: Singer-songwriter
- Instruments: Voice, classical guitar
- Years active: 1961–2003

José Antonio Sánchez Ferlosio (1940–2003), commonly known by his nickname Chicho Sánchez Ferlosio, was a Spanish anti-Francoist singer-songwriter and poet. Although the son of Falangist leader Rafael Sánchez Mazas, by the 1960s, Chicho Sánchez had joined the anti-Francoist opposition and began making and publishing music for the movement. Initially a communist, he later became an anarchist and continued making music through the Spanish transition to democracy.

== Biography ==
José Antonio Sánchez Ferlosio, later known by the nickname "Chicho", was born in 1940. He was the third son of the Falangist leader Rafael Sánchez Mazas, and the younger brother of Miguel, Rafael and Gabriela Sánchez Ferlosio. After growing up in Francoist Spain, a regime which his own father had helped to establish, Sánchez turned against the regime and became a staunch anti-Francoist activist.

By the 1960s, Sánchez had become a popular singer-songwriter of the anti-Francoist opposition. In 1961, he met a group of Italian anti-fascist musicians known as Cantacronache, with which he travelled around Spain collecting anti-Francoist poems and songs. Two years later, in 1963, he released the album Canciones de la resistencia española (English: Songs of the Spanish Resistance), which he published clandestinely in Sweden.

To evade Francoist censorship, Sánchez often presented the political content of his songs indirectly, as was the case with his 1964 song "Gallo rojo, gallo negro" (English: Red Rooster, Black Rooster). Sánchez popularised the song "La Huelga" (English: The Strike), written by Chilean singer-songwriter Roberto Alarcón, among Spanish listeners. He also inspired the Catalan Nova Cançó movement, which sought to rehabilitate regional cultures that were marginalised by the centralisation of the Francoist regime.

In 1965, Sánchez joined the Communist Party of Spain (Marxist–Leninist) (PCE-ML), but he quickly became disillusioned with Marxism-Leninism after visiting People's Republic of Albania and observing the political repression taking place there. He soon left the communist party and became an anarchist. Inspired by the anarchist philosophy of Agustín García Calvo, Sánchez became intensely critical of institutions such as the state, capitalism and the Catholic Church. He later joined the National Confederation of Labour (CNT), an anarchist trade union centre.

His music remained popular following the Spanish transition to democracy, taking a place among the counterculture that emerged during the 1970s. Later in his life, Sánchez was interviewed in a park in Madrid for the 2003 film Soldiers of Salamina, in which the protagonist investigated the unsuccessful attempt by Spanish republicans to execute his father. Sánchez died that same year, in 2003.

== Discography ==
- Canciones de la resistencia española (1963)
- A contratiempo (1978)
- Mientras el cuerpo aguante (1982)
- Romancero de Durruti (1999)

== Bibliography ==
- Archibald, David (2012). "The search for truth in Soldados de Salamina/Soldiers of Salamina". The war that won't die. Manchester University Press. pp. 168–183. doi:10.7765/9781526141842.00014. ISBN 978-0-7190-7808-8.
- de Haro García, Noemi (2019). "La Familia Lavapiés: Maoism, art and dissidence in Spain". In Galimberti, Jacopo; de Haro García, Noemi; H. F. Scott, Victoria (eds.). Art, Global Maoism and the Chinese Cultural Revolution. Manchester University Press. pp. 187–212. doi:10.7765/9781526117472.00015. hdl:10486/717785. ISBN 9781526117472.
- de Lorenzo, Javier; Ibarra, Andoni (2020). "The Fanciful Optimism of Miguel Sánchez-Mazas. Let Us Calculate... = Freedom and Justice - (El Optimismo Soñador de Miguel Sánchez-Mazas. Calculemos... = Libertad y Justicia". Theoria: An International Journal for Theory, History and Foundations of Science. 35 (3): 255–65. doi:10.1387/theoria.21922. hdl:10810/47916. ISSN 0495-4548. JSTOR 26936761.
- Forti, Steven (2021). ""L'estaca:" Transnational Trajectories of a Catalan Antifascist Song". Popular Music and Society. 44 (2): 139–156. doi:10.1080/03007766.2020.1820781.
- Green, Stuart; Marc, Isabelle (2016). "More Than Words: Theorizing the Singer-Songwriter". The Singer-Songwriter in Europe. Routledge. ISBN 9781315552910.
- Linville, Rachel Ann (2012). "The Idealization of Memory in Soldiers of Salamis". Bulletin of Hispanic Studies. 89 (4): 363–379. doi:10.3828/bhs.2012.27.
- Miranda-Barreiro, David (2023). "Songs of Migration: Toward a Poetics of (Un)happiness in Galician Pop Music (1969–1980)". In Amarelo, Daniel; Lesta García, Laura (eds.). Beyond sentidiño: New Diasporic Reflections on Galician Culture. Routledge. doi:10.4324/9781003330813-4. ISBN 9781003330813.
- Mulinari, Paula (2020). "The Best Thing I Have Done Is to Give Birth; The Second Is to Strike". In Fakier, Khayaat; Mulinari, Diana; Räthzel, Nora (eds.). Marxist-Feminist Theories and Struggles Today. Bloomsbury Publishing. pp. 124–143. ISBN 9781786996176.
- Ordóñez, Vicente (December 2018). "Agustin García Calvo in our time". Radical Philosophy (203): 73–77. ISSN 0300-211X.
- Sanz Sabido, Ruth (2016). "'Hunger for Bread and Horizons' Protest Songs in Franco's Spain". In Price, Stuart; Sanz Sabido, Ruth (eds.). Sites of Protest. pp. 57–71.
