= List of songs in SingStar games (PlayStation 2) =

The following is a list of SingStar games released for the PlayStation 2 video game console. The tables list the songs available in each game, with the country of availability indicated by two-letter country codes. For games that were localised for multiple markets, songs are either indicated as present ("Yes") or absent ("No") in the track list for each region.

The first game in the series, SingStar, was released in Europe and Oceania in 2004. As of 2008, over twenty games in the SingStar series have been released in English-speaking territories, including a small number in North America.

Most SingStar games are loosely based upon musical genres, such as rock or pop music (SingStar Rocks! and SingStar Pop respectively). Artist-specific SingStar games have been released, featuring artists such as ABBA, Queen, Take That, Die Toten Hosen, Kent and Mecano.

== SingStar ==
Artist	Song title	UK	DE	ES	FR	IT
A-ha	"Take On Me"	Yes	Yes	Yes	Yes	Yes
Alexia	"Egoista"	No	No	No	No	Yes
Atomic Kitten	"Eternal Flame"	Yes	Yes	Yes	Yes	Yes
Avril Lavigne	"Complicated"	Yes	Yes	Yes	Yes	Yes
Azúcar Moreno	"Sólo se vive una vez"	No	No	Yes	No	No
Beth	"Dime"	No	No	Yes	No	No
Blondie	"Heart of Glass"	Yes	No	No	Yes	Yes
Blue	"One Love"	Yes	Yes	No	Yes	Yes
Bro'Sis	"Do You"	No	Yes	No	No	No
Busted	"Crashed the Wedding"	Yes	No	Yes	No	Yes
Cali	"C'est Quand Le Bonheur"	No	No	No	Yes	No
Carl Douglas	"Kung Fu Fighting"	Yes	Yes	No	Yes	No
Daniel Bedingfield	"If You're Not the One"	Yes	No	No	No	No
Daniele Silvestri	"Salirò"	No	No	No	No	Yes
The Darkness	"I Believe in a Thing Called Love"	Yes	No	Yes	Yes	Yes
David Civera	"Bye Bye"	No	No	Yes	No	No
Deee-Lite	"Groove Is in the Heart"	Yes	No	No	Yes	Yes
Dido	"Thank You"	Yes	Yes	Yes	Yes	Yes
Die Toten Hosen	"Steh auf, wenn du am Boden bist"	No	Yes	No	No	No
Elvis Presley	"Suspicious Minds"	Yes	Yes	Yes	Yes	Yes
Emma Daumas	"Tu Seras"	No	No	No	Yes	No
Falco	"Rock Me Amadeus"	No	Yes	No	No	No
Fantastischen Vier	"Sie Ist Weg"	No	Yes	No	No	No
George Michael	"Careless Whisper"	Yes	Yes	Yes	Yes	Yes
Gloria Estefan	"Hoy"	No	No	Yes	No	No
Good Charlotte	"Girls & Boys"	Yes	No	Yes	No	No
Guaraná	"Noche en vela"	No	No	Yes	No	No
Hombres G	"Lo Noto"	No	No	Yes	No	No
Hombres G	"No Te Escaparás"	No	No	Yes	No	No
Jamelia	"Superstar"	Yes	Yes	Yes	Yes	Yes
Jamiroquai	"Deeper Underground"	No	Yes	No	No	No
Jessica Marquez	"Magdalena"	No	No	No	Yes	No
Juanes	A Dios le Pido"	No	No	Yes	No	No
Junior	"Down"	No	No	Yes	No	No
La Differenza	"In un istante"	No	No	No	No	Yes
La Oreja de Van Gogh	"20 de enero"	No	No	Yes	No	No
La Oreja de Van Gogh	"Puedes Contar Conmigo"	No	No	Yes	No	No
Laith Al-Deen	"Bilder Von Dir"	No	Yes	No	No	No
Lemar	"50/50"	Yes	No	No	No	No
Liberty X	"Just a Little"	Yes	No	No	Yes	Yes
Lightning Seeds	"Three Lions"	No	Yes	No	No	No
Los Rodríguez	"Sin Documentos"	No	No	Yes	No	No
Madonna	"Like a Virgin"	Yes	Yes	Yes	Yes	Yes
Mis-Teeq	"Scandalous"	Yes	No	No	Yes	Yes
Motörhead	"Ace of Spades"	Yes	Yes	No	No	Yes
Natalia Lafourcade	"En el 2000"	No	No	Yes	No	No
No Angels	"Someday"	No	Yes	No	No	No
Paola e Chiara	"Vamos a bailar"	No	No	No	No	Yes
Patrick Nuo	"5 Days"	No	Yes	No	No	No
Peter Schilling	"Major Tom"	No	Yes	No	No	No
Petula Clark	"Downtown"	Yes	Yes	No	No	No
P!nk	"Get the Party Started"	Yes	Yes	Yes	Yes	Yes
Rick Astley	"Never Gonna Give You Up"	Yes	Yes	No	Yes	Yes
Ricky Martin	"Livin' la Vida Loca"	Yes	Yes	Yes	Yes	Yes
Rosario	"Mi Gato"	No	No	Yes	No	No
Roy Orbison	"Oh, Pretty Woman"	Yes	Yes	Yes	Yes	Yes
S Club	"Don't Stop Movin'"	Yes	Yes	No	Yes	Yes
Sinclair	"Ensemble"	No	No	No	Yes	No
Sinclair	"Si C'est Bon Comme Ça"	No	No	No	Yes	No
Sinclair	"Votre Image"	No	No	No	Yes	No
Sophie Ellis-Bextor	"Murder on the Dancefloor"	Yes	Yes	No	Yes	Yes
Subsonica	"Nuova ossessione"	No	No	No	No	Yes
Sugababes	"Round Round"	Yes	Yes	Yes	No	Yes
Tragédie	"Hey Oh!"	No	No	No	Yes	No
Village People	"Y.M.C.A."	Yes	Yes	Yes	Yes	Yes
Westlife	"World of Our Own"	Yes	No	No	Yes	Yes
Artist	Song title	UK	DE	ES	FR	IT

== SingStar '80s ==
All non-English releases which are not in the table have the same tracklist as UK.

Artist	Song title	UK	NA	DE	FR	IT	NL	PL	SE
Alice Cooper	"Poison"	Yes	No	No	No	No	Yes	No	Yes
Belinda Carlisle	"Heaven Is a Place on Earth"	Yes	No	No	No	Yes	No	Yes	No
Benny Neyman	"Vrijgezel"	No	No	No	No	No	Yes	No	No
Billy Joel	"Uptown Girl"	Yes	Yes	Yes	Yes	No	No	No	Yes
Billy Ocean	"Caribbean Queen"	No	Yes	No	No	No	No	No	No
Blondie	"Atomic"	Yes	No	Yes	Yes	Yes	Yes	Yes	Yes
Blondie	"Heart of Glass"	No	Yes	No	No	No	No	No	No
Budka Suflera	"Za Ostatni Grosz"	No	No	No	No	No	No	Yes	No
Caroline Loeb	"C'est La Ouate"	No	No	No	Yes	No	No	No	No
Chattanooga	"Hallå hela pressen"	No	No	No	No	No	No	No	Yes
Christer Sandelin	"Det Hon Vill Ha"	No	No	No	No	No	No	No	Yes
Circus Custers	"Verliefd"	No	No	No	No	No	Yes	No	No
Clouseau	"Anne"	No	No	No	No	No	Yes	No	No
Clouseau	"Daar Gaat Ze"	No	No	No	No	No	Yes	No	No
Corynne Charby	"Boule de flipper"	No	No	No	Yes	No	No	No	No
The Creeps	"Ooh I Like It!"	No	No	No	No	No	No	No	Yes
Culture Club	"Do You Really Want to Hurt Me?"	No	Yes	No	No	No	No	No	No
Culture Club	"Karma Chameleon"	Yes	No	Yes	No	Yes	Yes	Yes	Yes
The Cure	"Just Like Heaven"	Yes	No	No	No	No	No	Yes	No
Cyndi Lauper	"Time After Time"	No	Yes	No	No	No	No	No	No
Cyndi Lauper	"She Bop"	No	No	Yes	No	No	No	No	No
David et Jonathan	"Est-Ce Que Tu Viens Pour Les Vacances"	No	No	No	Yes	No	No	No	No
De Kast	"Morgen Wordt Het Beter"	No	No	No	No	No	Yes	No	No
Dead or Alive	"You Spin Me Round (Like a Record)"	No	Yes	No	No	No	No	No	No
Dexys Midnight Runners	"Come On Eileen"	Yes	Yes	Yes	No	No	No	No	Yes
Di Leva	"Vem Skall Jag Tro På!"	No	No	No	No	No	No	No	Yes
Dolly Dots	"Do Wah Diddy Diddy"	No	No	No	No	No	Yes	No	No
Dolly Parton	"9 to 5"	Yes	No	No	No	No	Yes	No	Yes
Donatella Rettore	"Kobra"	No	No	No	No	Yes	No	No	No
Drukwerk	"Carolien"	No	No	No	No	No	Yes	No	No
Duran Duran	"Rio"	Yes	Yes	No	No	Yes	No	Yes	Yes
Elsa	"T'en va pas"	No	No	No	Yes	No	No	No	No
Erasure	"A Little Respect"	Yes	Yes	No	No	No	No	Yes	Yes
Erik Mesie	"Zonder Jou"	No	No	No	No	No	Yes	No	No
Europe	"The Final Countdown"	Yes	Yes	Yes	Yes	Yes	Yes	Yes	Yes
F. R. David	"Words"	No	No	No	Yes	No	No	No	No
Factory	"Efter plugget"	No	No	No	No	No	No	No	Yes
Fairground Attraction	"Perfect"	Yes	No	No	No	No	Yes	No	Yes
Fausto Leali & Anna Oxa	"Ti lascerò"	No	No	No	No	Yes	No	No	No
A Flock of Seagulls	"I Ran (So Far Away)"	No	Yes	No	No	No	No	No	No
Foreigner	"I Want to Know What Love Is"	Yes	Yes	Yes	No	No	No	Yes	Yes
Frank Boeijen	"Kronenburg Park"	No	No	No	No	No	Yes	No	No
Frankie Goes to Hollywood	"The Power of Love"	Yes	No	Yes	No	Yes	No	Yes	Yes
Freestyle	"Fantasi"	No	No	No	No	No	No	No	Yes
Geier Sturzflug	"Bruttosozialprodukt"	No	No	Yes	No	No	No	No	No
Gianni Morandi, Enrico Ruggeri & Umberto Tozzi	"Si Può Dare Di Più"	No	No	No	No	Yes	No	No	No
Giuni Russo	"Un'Estate Al Mare"	No	No	No	No	Yes	No	No	No
Gold	"Plus Près Des étoiles"	No	No	No	Yes	No	No	No	No
Grazia Di Michele	"Le Ragazze Di Gauguin"	No	No	No	No	Yes	No	No	No
Gruppo Italiano	"Tropicana"	No	No	No	No	Yes	No	No	No
iHans de Booy	"Alle Vrouwen"	No	No	No	No	No	Yes	No	No
Het Goede Doel	"Belgie"	No	No	No	No	No	Yes	No	No
Hubert Kah	"Sternenhimmel"	No	No	Yes	No	No	No	No	No
Imagination	"Just an Illusion"	No	No	No	Yes	No	No	No	No
INXS	"Need You Tonight"	No	No	No	Yes	No	No	No	No
IXI	"Der Knutschfleck"	No	No	Yes	No	No	No	No	No
Janne Lucas	"Växeln hallå"	No	No	No	No	No	No	No	Yes
Joachim Witt	"Goldener Reiter"	No	No	Yes	No	No	No	No	No
Johan Verminnen	"Mooie Dagen"	No	No	No	No	No	Yes	No	No
Julie Pietri	"Ève lève-toi"	No	No	No	Yes	No	No	No	No
Kadanz	"Intimiteit"	No	No	No	No	No	Yes	No	No
Kapitan Nemo	"Twoja Lorelei"	No	No	No	No	No	No	Yes	No
Kate Bush	"Running Up That Hill"	Yes	No	No	Yes	Yes	No	No	No
Katrina and the Waves	"Walking on Sunshine"	Yes	No	Yes	Yes	Yes	Yes	Yes	Yes
Kim Wilde	"Kids in America"	No	Yes	No	No	No	No	No	No
Klaus Mitffoch	"Jezu, Jak Się Cieszę"	No	No	No	No	No	No	Yes	No
Kobranocka	"Kocham Cię Jak Irlandię"	No	No	No	No	No	No	Yes	No
Koos Alberts	"Zijn Het Je Ogen"	No	No	No	No	No	Yes	No	No
La Compagnie Créole	"Le Bal Masqué"	No	No	No	Yes	No	No	No	No
Lady Pank	"Kryzysowa Narzeczona"	No	No	No	No	No	No	Yes	No
Laroche Valmont	"T'as Le Look Coco"	No	No	No	Yes	No	No	No	No
Limahl	"Neverending Story"	No	No	Yes	No	No	No	No	No
Lio	"Les Brunes"	No	No	No	Yes	No	No	No	No
Litfiba	"El Diablo"	No	No	No	No	Yes	No	No	No
Loredana Bertè	"Non sono una signora"	No	No	No	No	Yes	No	No	No
Maanam	"Kocham Cię, Kochanie Moje"	No	No	No	No	No	No	Yes	No
Madness	"Our House"	Yes	Yes	No	Yes	No	No	No	No
Madonna	"Material Girl"	Yes	Yes	No	Yes	Yes	Yes	Yes	Yes
Majka Jeżowska	"A Ja Wolę Moją Mamę"	No	No	No	No	No	No	Yes	No
Małgorzata Ostrowska	"Szklana Pogoda"	No	No	No	No	No	No	Yes	No
Marcella Bella	"Nell'aria"	No	No	No	No	Yes	No	No	No
Marietta	"Fire & Ice"	No	No	Yes	No	No	No	No	No
Marillion	"Kayleigh"	Yes	No	Yes	No	No	No	No	No
Men at Work	"Who Can It Be Now?"	No	Yes	No	No	No	No	No	No
Meneer Kaktus	"Meneer Kaktus Lied"	No	No	No	No	No	Yes	No	No
Modern Talking	"Cheri Cheri Lady"	No	No	Yes	No	No	No	No	No
Münchener Freiheit	"Ohne Dich (Schlaf’ Ich Heut’ Nacht Nicht Ein)"	No	No	Yes	No	No	No	No	No
Nena	"99 Red Balloons"	Yes	Yes	No	Yes	No	No	No	No
Nena	"99 Luftballons"	No	No	Yes	No	No	No	No	No
Nino de Angelo	"Jenseits Von Eden"	No	No	Yes	No	No	No	No	No
Opus	"Live Is Life"	No	No	Yes	Yes	No	No	No	No
Ottawan	"T'es OK"	No	No	No	Yes	No	No	No	No
Papa Dance	"Nasz Disneyland"	No	No	No	No	No	No	Yes	No
Philippe Lavil	"Il Tape Sur Des Bambous"	No	No	No	Yes	No	No	No	No
The Pretenders	"Brass in Pocket"	Yes	Yes	No	No	No	No	No	Yes
Pupo	"Su Di Noi"	No	No	No	No	Yes	No	No	No
R.E.M.	"Stand"	No	Yes	No	No	No	No	No	No
Raf	"Cosa Resterà Degli Anni '80"	No	No	No	No	Yes	No	No	No
Ratata & Frida	"Så länge vi har varann"	No	No	No	No	No	No	No	Yes
Ricchi e Poveri	"Sarà perché ti amo"	No	No	No	Yes	No	No	No	No
Rob De Nijs	"Zondag"	No	No	No	No	No	Yes	No	No
Rudi Schuberth	"Córka Rybaka"	No	No	No	No	No	No	Yes	No
Run–D.M.C.	"It's Tricky"	Yes	Yes	No	No	No	No	Yes	No
Sabine Paturel	"Les Bêtises"	No	No	No	Yes	No	No	No	No
Seweryn Krajewski	"Baw Mnie"	No	No	No	No	No	No	Yes	No
Simple Minds	"Don't You (Forget About Me)"	Yes	Yes	Yes	Yes	Yes	Yes	No	Yes
Soft Cell	"Tainted Love"	Yes	Yes	Yes	Yes	Yes	Yes	Yes	Yes
Squeeze	"Tempted"	No	Yes	No	No	No	No	No	No
Stadio	"Chiedi Chi Erano I Beatles"	No	No	No	No	Yes	No	No	No
Starship	"We Built This City"	Yes	Yes	Yes	No	No	No	No	Yes
Stéphanie	"Ouragan"	No	No	No	Yes	No	No	No	No
Survivor	"Eye of the Tiger"	Yes	Yes	Yes	No	No	Yes	No	Yes
Tears for Fears	"Everybody Wants to Rule the World"	Yes	Yes	Yes	Yes	Yes	No	No	Yes
Thompson Twins	"Hold Me Now"	No	Yes	No	No	No	No	No	No
Tilt	"Runął Już Ostatni Mur"	No	No	No	No	No	No	Yes	No
Tina Turner	"The Best"	Yes	Yes	Yes	No	Yes	Yes	Yes	Yes
Trio Rio	"New York, Rio, Tokyo"	No	No	Yes	No	No	No	No	No
Twisted Sister	"We're Not Gonna Take It"	No	Yes	No	No	No	No	No	No
Umberto Balsamo	"Balla"	No	No	No	No	Yes	No	No	No
Umberto Tozzi	"Gloria"	No	No	No	No	Yes	No	No	No
Vanilla Ice	"Ice Ice Baby"	Yes	No	No	No	No	Yes	Yes	No
Vasco Rossi	"Vita spericolata"	No	No	No	No	Yes	No	No	No
Vox	"Bananowy Song"	No	No	No	No	No	No	Yes	No
Westernhagen	"Sexy"	No	No	Yes	No	No	No	No	No
Wham!	"Wake Me Up Before You Go-Go"	Yes	Yes	Yes	Yes	Yes	Yes	Yes	Yes
Zbigniew Wodecki	"Chałupy Welcome To"	No	No	No	No	No	No	Yes	No
Zucchero & The Randy Jackson Band	"Donne"	No	No	No	No	Yes	No	No	No
Artist	Song title	UK	NA	DE	FR	IT	NL	PL	SE

== SingStar '90s ==
All non-English releases have the same tracklist as UK.

Artist	Song title	UK	NA
All Saints	"Never Ever"	Yes	No
Aqua	"Barbie Girl"	Yes	No
Arrested Development	"Tennessee"	No	Yes
The B-52's	"Love Shack"	Yes	No
Barenaked Ladies	"One Week"	Yes	No
Billy Ray Cyrus	"Achy Breaky Heart"	Yes	No
Boyz II Men	"Motownphilly"	No	Yes
The Cardigans	"Lovefool"	Yes	No
Chumbawamba	"Tubthumping"	No	Yes
Color Me Badd	"I Wanna Sex You Up"	No	Yes
The Cranberries	"Zombie"	Yes	Yes
Crash Test Dummies	"Mmm Mmm Mmm Mmm"	Yes	No
The Cure	"Friday I'm in Love"	Yes	No
Divinyls	"I Touch Myself"	Yes	Yes
EMF	"Unbelievable"	Yes	No
En Vogue	"Free Your Mind"	No	Yes
Extreme	"More Than Words"	No	Yes
Gin Blossoms	"Hey Jealousy"	Yes	Yes
Hootie & the Blowfish	"Only Wanna Be with You"	No	Yes
Jesus Jones	"Right Here, Right Now"	No	Yes
Len	"Steal My Sunshine"	No	Yes
Lisa Loeb	"Stay (I Missed You)"	Yes	No
M People	"Moving On Up"	Yes	No
MC Hammer	"U Can't Touch This"	Yes	Yes
Meredith Brooks	"Bitch"	Yes	No
Natalie Imbruglia	"Torn"	Yes	Yes
New Kids on the Block	"Step by Step"	Yes	Yes
Nick Cave & Kylie Minogue	"Where the Wild Roses Grow"	Yes	No
Nirvana	"Lithium"	No	Yes
Paula Abdul	"Opposites Attract"	No	Yes
Poison	"Unskinny Bop"	Yes	Yes
R.E.M.	"Everybody Hurts"	Yes	Yes
Radiohead	"Creep"	Yes	No
Roachford	"Only to Be with You"	Yes	No
Santana feat. Rob Thomas	"Smooth"	No	Yes
Savage Garden	"I Want You"	Yes	Yes
Seal	"Kiss from a Rose"	Yes	Yes
Sir Mix-a-Lot	"Baby Got Back"	Yes	Yes
Sixpence None the Richer	"Kiss Me"	No	Yes
Soundgarden	"Black Hole Sun"	No	Yes
Spice Girls	"Wannabe"	Yes	No
Spin Doctors	"Two Princes"	Yes	Yes
Stone Temple Pilots	"Plush"	No	Yes
Technotronic feat. Felly	"Pump Up the Jam"	Yes	Yes
Vanilla Ice	"Ice Ice Baby"	No	Yes
Wet Wet Wet	"Love Is All Around"	Yes	No
Wilson Phillips	"Hold On"	No	Yes
Artist	Song title	UK	NA

== SingStar ABBA ==
Artist	Song title	UK	ES
ABBA	"Chiquitita"	Yes	Yes
ABBA	"Dancing Queen"	Yes	Yes
ABBA	"Does Your Mother Know"	Yes	Yes
ABBA	"Estoy soñando"	No	Yes
ABBA	"Felicidad"	No	Yes
ABBA	"Fernando"	Yes	Yes
ABBA	"Gimme! Gimme! Gimme! (A Man After Midnight)"	Yes	Yes
ABBA	"I Do, I Do, I Do, I Do, I Do"	Yes	No
ABBA	"Knowing Me, Knowing You"	Yes	Yes
ABBA	"Mamma Mia"	Yes	Yes
ABBA	"Money, Money, Money"	Yes	Yes
ABBA	"No hay a quien culpar"	No	Yes
ABBA	"One of Us"	Yes	No
ABBA	"Ring Ring"	Yes	Yes
ABBA	"SOS"	Yes	Yes
ABBA	"Summer Night City"	Yes	Yes
ABBA	"Super Trouper"	Yes	Yes
ABBA	"Take a Chance on Me"	Yes	Yes
ABBA	"Thank You for the Music"	Yes	Yes
ABBA	"The Name of The Game"	Yes	No
ABBA	"The Winner Takes It All"	Yes	Yes
ABBA	"Voulez-Vous"	Yes	Yes
ABBA	"Waterloo"	Yes	Yes
Artist	Song title	UK	ES

== SingStar Afrikaanse Treffers ==
This is a South Africa only game.

Artist	Song title	ZA
Blackie Swart	"Liewe Lulu"	Yes
Bobby van Jaarsveld	"Spieeltjie"	Yes
Bok van Blerk & Robbie Wessels	"Ons Vir Jou Suid Afrika"	Yes
David Fourie	"Jy Soen Soos 'n Engel"	Yes
Die Campbells	"Rooi Rok Bokkie"	Yes
Dozi	"Jan Asseblief Tog Squeeze My"	Yes
Gerhard Steyn	"Diamante Vir Jou"	Yes
Gé Korsten	"Liefling"	Yes
Heinz Winckler	"Ek Kan Weer In Liefde Glo"	Yes
Jack Parow	"Cooler As Ekke"	Yes
Jakkie Louw	"Drie Pikkewyne"	Yes
Juanita du Plessis	"Ska-Rumba"	Yes
Juanita du Plessis	"Lepelle"	Yes
Karen Zoid	"Afrikaners Is Plesierig"	Yes
Kurt Darren	"Meisie Meisie"	Yes
Kurt Darren	"Loslappie"	Yes
Liani May	"Jy Soen My Nie Meer Nie"	Yes
Nádine	"Kaapse Draai"	Yes
Pieter Koen	"3 Susters Van Drie Susters"	Yes
Ray Dylan	"Jessica"	Yes
Robbie Wessels	"Leeuloop"	Yes
Romanz	"My Hele Hart"	Yes
Snotkop	"Parapapa"	Yes
Steve Hofmeyr	"Pampoen"	Yes
Theuns Jordaan	"Soos Bloed"	Yes
Artist	Song title	ZA

== SingStar Amped ==
Artist	Song title	NA	AU	DE
4 Non Blondes	"What's Up?"	No	Yes	No
Alice in Chains	"Would?"	Yes	No	No
Audioslave	"Cochise"	Yes	No	No
Beatsteaks	"Cut off the Top"	No	No	Yes
Blind	"Break Away"	No	No	Yes
Blink-182	"I Miss You"	Yes	Yes	Yes
Blue Öyster Cult	"(Don't Fear) The Reaper"	Yes	Yes	Yes
Bonfire	"You Make Me Feel"	No	No	Yes
Boston	"More Than a Feeling"	Yes	No	No
Caesars	"Jerk It Out"	No	No	Yes
Cheap Trick	"I Want You to Want Me"	Yes	Yes	Yes
The Choirboys	"Run to Paradise"	No	Yes	No
The Cure	"Primary"	No	Yes	No
David Bowie	"Changes"	Yes	Yes	Yes
Die Toten Hosen	"Warum Werde Ich Nicht Satt"	No	No	Yes
Divinyls	"Boys in Town"	No	Yes	No
Faith No More	"Evidence"	No	Yes	No
Faker	"This Heart Attack"	No	Yes	No
Fall Out Boy	"This Ain't a Scene, It's an Arms Race"	Yes	Yes	Yes
Foo Fighters	"Best of You"	Yes	No	No
Franz Ferdinand	"Take Me Out"	No	No	Yes
Free	"All Right Now"	Yes	Yes	Yes
Good Charlotte	"Dance Floor Anthem (I Don't Want to Be in Love)"	No	No	Yes
Gotthard	"Lift U Up"	No	No	Yes
Grinspoon	"Chemical Heart"	No	Yes	No
The Hives	"Walk Idiot Walk"	No	No	Yes
Iggy Pop	"Real Wild Child (Wild One)"	Yes	Yes	Yes
In Extremo	"Küss Mich"	No	No	Yes
Judas Priest	"Breaking the Law"	No	Yes	Yes
Judas Priest	"You've Got Another Thing Comin'"	Yes	Yes	Yes
Kasabian	"L. S. F. (Lost Souls Forever)"	No	Yes	Yes
The Killers	"When You Were Young"	Yes	No	No
Mando Diao	"Long Before Rock 'n' Roll"	No	No	Yes
The Mighty Mighty Bosstones	"The Impression That I Get"	No	Yes	No
Motörhead	"Ace of Spades"	Yes	No	No
Nickelback	"Savin' Me"	Yes	No	No
Nirvana	"Come as You Are"	Yes	No	No
O.A.R.	"Love and Memories"	Yes	No	Yes
Pearl Jam	"Alive"	Yes	No	No
Poison	"Every Rose Has Its Thorn"	Yes	No	No
Queens of the Stone Age	"Go with the Flow"	Yes	No	No
Quiet Riot	"Cum On Feel the Noize"	Yes	Yes	Yes
Radiohead	"Creep"	Yes	No	No
Ramones	"Blitzkrieg Bop"	Yes	No	No
Regurgitator	"Black Bugs"	No	Yes	No
Robert Palmer	"Addicted to Love"	No	Yes	No
The Saints	"I'm Stranded"	No	Yes	No
Scorpions	"Rock You Like a Hurricane"	No	No	Yes
Silverchair	"The Greatest View"	No	Yes	No
Skunk Anansie	"Weak"	No	Yes	Yes
Soul Asylum	"Runaway Train"	No	Yes	Yes
Spiderbait	"Blackbetty"	No	Yes	No
Steppenwolf	"Born to Be Wild"	Yes	No	No
Stone Temple Pilots	"Vasoline"	Yes	No	No
Sublime	"Santeria"	Yes	No	Yes
The Subways	"Rock & Roll Queen"	No	Yes	Yes
Talking Heads	"Burning Down the House"	Yes	No	No
Tonic	"If You Could Only See"	No	Yes	No
T. Rex	"20th Century Boy"	No	Yes	No
Warrant	"Cherry Pie"	No	Yes	Yes
Wolfmother	"Woman"	No	No	Yes
Yeah Yeah Yeahs	"Gold Lion"	Yes	No	No
Yes	"Owner of a Lonely Heart"	Yes	No	No
ZZ Top	"Gimme All Your Lovin'"	Yes	No	No
Artist	Song title	NA	AU	DE

== SingStar Anthems ==
All releases have the same tracklist as UK.

Artist	Song title	UK
Bananarama	"I Heard a Rumour"	Yes
Bonnie Tyler	"Total Eclipse of the Heart"	Yes
Bucks Fizz	"Making Your Mind Up"	Yes
Candi Staton	"Young Hearts Run Free"	Yes
Charlene	"I've Never Been to Me"	Yes
Charlotte Church	"Crazy Chick"	Yes
Cher	"If I Could Turn Back Time"	Yes
Dead or Alive	"You Spin Me Round (Like a Record)"	Yes
Girls Aloud	"Biology"	Yes
Gloria Gaynor	"I Will Survive"	Yes
Kim Wilde	"Kids in America"	Yes
LeAnn Rimes	"Can't Fight the Moonlight"	Yes
The Pussycat Dolls	"Don't Cha"	Yes
Queen	"Radio Ga Ga"	Yes
Scissor Sisters	"Laura"	Yes
Steps	"Deeper Shade of Blue"	Yes
Take That (featuring Lulu)	"Relight My Fire"	Yes
Ultra Naté	"Free"	Yes
The Weather Girls	"It's Raining Men"	Yes
Whitney Houston	"I Wanna Dance with Somebody (Who Loves Me)"	Yes
Artist	Song title	UK

== SingStar Boy Bands vs Girl Bands ==
Artist	Song title	UK
Bananarama	"Cruel Summer"	Yes
Bananarama	"Love in the First Degree"	Yes
The Bangles	"Eternal Flame"	Yes
Boyz II Men	"I'll Make Love to You"	Yes
Boyzone	"Love Me for a Reason"	Yes
Bros	"I Owe You Nothing"	Yes
Busted	"Air Hostess"	Yes
Busted	"What I Go to School For"	Yes
East 17	"Let It Rain"	Yes
East 17	"Stay Another Day"	Yes
En Vogue	"Free Your Mind"	Yes
Five	"Everybody Get Up"	Yes
Five	"Keep On Movin'"	Yes
Girls Aloud	"The Show"	Yes
Hanson	"MMMBop"	Yes
Jade	"Don't Walk Away"	Yes
McFly	"All About You"	Yes
McFly	"5 Colours in Her Hair"	Yes
Mel and Kim	"Showing Out (Get Fresh at the Weekend)"	Yes
Mis-Teeq	"One Night Stand"	Yes
New Edition	"Candy Girl"	Yes
The Pussycat Dolls	"Stickwitu"	Yes
The Shangri-Las	"Leader of the Pack"	Yes
Sister Sledge	"He's the Greatest Dancer"	Yes
Spice Girls	"Say You'll Be There"	Yes
Sugababes	"About You Now"	Yes
The Supremes	"Stop! In the Name of Love"	Yes
Westlife	"Flying Without Wings"	Yes
Westlife	"Swear It Again"	Yes
Wilson Phillips	"Hold On"	Yes
Artist	Song title	UK

== Singstar Chart Hits ==
This is an Australian and New Zealand only game.

Artist	Song title	AU
3OH!3	"Don't Trust Me"	Yes
A. R. Rahman feat. The Pussycat Dolls	"Jai Ho"	Yes
Alex Lloyd	"Amazing"	Yes
Ben Lee	"Catch My Disease"	Yes
Colbie Caillat	"Fallin' for You"	Yes
Empire of the Sun	"Walking on a Dream"	Yes
George Michael	"Outside"	Yes
Guy Sebastian feat. Jordin Sparks	"Art of Love"	Yes
Kate Miller-Heidke	"The Last Day on Earth"	Yes
La Roux	"Bulletproof"	Yes
Lady Gaga	"Poker Face"	Yes
The Last Goodnight	"Pictures of You"	Yes
The Living End	"White Noise"	Yes
Michael Bublé	"Haven't Met You Yet"	Yes
Mika	"We Are Golden"	Yes
Milli Vanilli	"Blame It on the Rain"	Yes
Natalie Bassingthwaighte	"Alive"	Yes
Nelly Furtado	"Turn Off the Light"	Yes
Pixie Lott	"Boys and Girls"	Yes
The Presets	"This Boy's in Love"	Yes
The Pussycat Dolls	"Hush Hush; Hush Hush"	Yes
Vanessa Amorosi	"This Is Who I Am"	Yes
Vitamin C	"Graduation (Friends Forever)"	Yes
Wes Carr	"Feels Like Woah"	Yes
Wolfmother	"New Moon Rising"	Yes
Artist	Song title	AU

== SingStar Country ==
Artist	Song title	NA
Alan Jackson	"Chattahoochee"	Yes
Alan Jackson	"Good Time"	Yes
Big & Rich	"Save a Horse (Ride a Cowboy)"	Yes
Blake Shelton	"Home"	Yes
Brad Paisley	"Online"	Yes
Brooks & Dunn	"Boot Scootin' Boogie"	Yes
Brooks & Dunn (with Reba McEntire)	"If You See Him/If You See Her"	Yes
Bucky Covington	"It's Good To Be Us"	Yes
Faith Hill	"Red Umbrella"	Yes
Gretchen Wilson	"Redneck Woman"	Yes
Jessica Simpson	"Come On Over"	Yes
Jewel	"Stronger Woman"	Yes
Johnny Cash	"A Boy Named Sue"	Yes
Johnny Cash	"I Walk the Line"	Yes
Josh Turner	"Another Try"	Yes
Keith Urban	"Days Go By"	Yes
Kellie Pickler	"Red High Heels"	Yes
Kenny Chesney	"Big Star"	Yes
Lady Antebellum	"Love Don't Live Here"	Yes
Martina McBride	"A Broken Wing"	Yes
Miranda Lambert	"Kerosene"	Yes
Montgomery Gentry	"My Town"	Yes
Montgomery Gentry	"What Do Ya Think About That"	Yes
Rascal Flatts	"Bless the Broken Road"	Yes
Sara Evans	"Born to Fly"	Yes
Taylor Swift	"Our Song"	Yes
Terri Clark	"Girls Lie Too"	Yes
Trace Adkins	"Honky Tonk Badonkadonk"	Yes
Trace Adkins	"You're Gonna Miss This"	Yes
Willie Nelson	"Pancho and Lefty"	Yes
Artist	Song title	NA

== SingStar Hottest Hits ==
Artist	Song title	AU	DE	PT
Annie	"I Know UR Girlfriend Hates Me"	Yes	Yes	Yes
Avril Lavigne	"When You're Gone"	Yes	Yes	Yes
Calvin Harris	"Acceptable in the 80s"	Yes	Yes	Yes
Colbie Caillat	"Bubbly"	Yes	Yes	Yes
Delta Goodrem	"You Will Only Break My Heart"	Yes	Yes	Yes
Fall Out Boy	"Thnks fr th Mmrs"	Yes	Yes	Yes
Fergie	"Clumsy"	Yes	Yes	Yes
Finger Eleven	"Paralyzer"	Yes	Yes	Yes
The Fray	"How to Save a Life"	Yes	Yes	Yes
Gabriella Cilmi	"Sweet About Me"	Yes	Yes	Yes
Lily Allen	"LDN"	Yes	Yes	Yes
Maroon 5	"Makes Me Wonder"	Yes	Yes	Yes
Mika	"Grace Kelly"	Yes	Yes	Yes
Mika	"Love Today"	Yes	Yes	Yes
My Chemical Romance	"Teenagers"	Yes	Yes	Yes
Nelly Furtado	"All Good Things (Come to an End)"	Yes	Yes	Yes
One Night Only	"Just for Tonight"	Yes	Yes	Yes
OneRepublic	"Stop and Stare"	Yes	Yes	Yes
Operator Please	"Just a Song About Ping Pong"	Yes	Yes	Yes
The Potbelleez	"Don't Hold Back"	Yes	Yes	Yes
Powderfinger	"Lost and Running"	Yes	Yes	Yes
Ricki-Lee	"Can't Sing a Different Song"	Yes	Yes	Yes
Sam Sparro	"Black and Gold"	Yes	Yes	Yes
Sean Kingston	"Beautiful Girls"	Yes	Yes	Yes
Sneaky Sound System	"Pictures"	Yes	Yes	Yes
Snow Patrol	"Chasing Cars"	Yes	Yes	Yes
The Ting Tings	"Great DJ"	Yes	Yes	Yes
The Ting Tings	"That's Not My Name"	Yes	Yes	Yes
Vanessa Amorosi	"Perfect"	Yes	Yes	Yes
will.i.am	"I Got It From My Mama"	Yes	Yes	Yes
Artist	Song title	AU	DE	PT

== SingStar Legends ==
(Titled SingStar Legendat in Finland)

Artist	Song title	UK	NA	AU	DE	DK	ES	FI	FR	IT
883	"Una canzone d'amore"	No	No	No	No	No	No	No	No	Yes
Aki Sirkesalo	"Naispaholainen"	No	No	No	No	No	No	Yes	No	No
The Angels	"No Secrets"	No	No	Yes	No	No	No	No	No	No
Anssi Kela	"Milla"	No	No	No	No	No	No	Yes	No	No
Aretha Franklin	"Respect"	Yes	No	Yes	Yes	Yes	Yes	Yes	Yes	Yes
Barry White	"You're the First, the Last, My Everything"	Yes	Yes	No	Yes	Yes	No	No	Yes	Yes
The Beach Boys	"Surfin' U.S.A."	No	No	No	No	No	Yes	No	No	No
Biz Markie	"Just a Friend"	No	Yes	No	No	No	No	No	No	No
Blå Øjne	"Fiskene I Havet"	No	No	No	No	Yes	No	No	No	No
Black Sabbath	"Paranoid"	Yes	Yes	Yes	Yes	No	Yes	Yes	Yes	No
Blur	"Parklife"	Yes	No	No	No	No	Yes	No	Yes	No
Bonnie Tyler	"Total Eclipse of the Heart"	No	Yes	No	No	No	No	No	No	No
Brødrene Olsen	"Smuk Som Et Stjerneskud"	No	No	No	No	Yes	No	No	No	No
Carmen Consoli	"Confusa e felice"	No	No	No	No	No	No	No	No	Yes
Carmen Consoli	"Parole di burro"	No	No	No	No	No	No	No	No	Yes
Danser Med Drenge	"Hvorlænge Vil Du Ydmyge Dig?"	No	No	No	No	Yes	No	No	No	No
David Bowie	"Life on Mars?"	Yes	Yes	Yes	Yes	No	Yes	No	Yes	Yes
Depeche Mode	"Enjoy the Silence"	Yes	No	No	Yes	No	Yes	Yes	Yes	Yes
Det Brune Punktum	"Jeg Vil I Seng Med De Fleste"	No	No	No	No	Yes	No	No	No	No
Don Huonot	"Riidankylväjä"	No	No	No	No	No	No	Yes	No	No
Dusty Springfield	"Son of a Preacher Man"	Yes	Yes	Yes	Yes	Yes	Yes	No	Yes	Yes
The Easybeats	"Friday on My Mind"	No	No	Yes	No	No	No	No	No	No
Ella Fitzgerald and Louis Armstrong	"Let's Call the Whole Thing Off"	Yes	Yes	No	Yes	No	Yes	No	Yes	No
Elton John	"I'm Still Standing"	No	Yes	No	No	No	No	No	No	No
Elton John	"Rocket Man"	Yes	No	Yes	Yes	No	Yes	No	Yes	Yes
Elvis Presley	"Blue Suede Shoes"	Yes	Yes	Yes	Yes	Yes	Yes	No	Yes	Yes
Eppu Normaali	"Tahroja paperilla"	No	No	No	No	No	No	Yes	No	No
Grateful Dead	"Touch of Grey"	No	Yes	No	No	No	No	No	No	No
Hélène Segara	"Il y a trop de gens qui t'aiment"	No	No	No	No	No	No	No	Yes	No
HIM	"Right Here in My Arms"	No	No	No	No	No	No	Yes	No	No
Indica	"Ikuinen virta"	No	No	No	No	No	No	Yes	No	No
J. Karjalainen ja mustat lasit	"Doris"	No	No	No	No	No	No	Yes	No	No
Jackie Wilson	"Reet Petite"	Yes	No	Yes	Yes	No	Yes	No	Yes	Yes
The Jackson 5	"I Want You Back"	Yes	Yes	Yes	Yes	Yes	Yes	Yes	Yes	Yes
James Brown	"I Got You (I Feel Good)"	No	Yes	No	No	No	No	No	No	No
Jimmy Barnes	"No Second Prize"	No	No	Yes	No	No	No	No	No	No
Jimmy Barnes	"Working Class Man"	No	No	Yes	No	No	No	No	No	No
John Farnham	"You're the Voice"	No	No	Yes	No	No	No	No	No	No
John Lennon	"Imagine"	Yes	Yes	Yes	Yes	Yes	Yes	Yes	Yes	Yes
John Mogensen	"Der Er Noget Galt i Danmark"	No	No	No	No	Yes	No	No	No	No
John Paul Young	"Love Is in the Air"	No	No	Yes	No	No	No	No	No	No
Johnny Cash	"Ring of Fire"	Yes	Yes	Yes	Yes	Yes	Yes	No	Yes	No
Johnny Deluxe feat. Anna Nordell	"Drømmer Jeg?"	No	No	No	No	Yes	No	No	No	No
Jovanotti	"Bella"	No	No	No	No	No	No	No	No	Yes
Jovanotti	"Ragazzo Fortunato"	No	No	No	No	No	No	No	No	Yes
Joy Division	"Love Will Tear Us Apart"	No	Yes	No	No	No	No	No	No	No
Karen Busck & Erann DD	"Hjertet Ser"	No	No	No	No	Yes	No	No	No	No
Lars Lilholt	"Kald Det Kærlighed"	No	No	No	No	Yes	No	No	No	No
Ligabue	"A che ora è la fine del mondo?"	No	No	No	No	No	No	No	No	Yes
Lordi	"Hard Rock Hallelujah"	No	No	No	No	No	No	Yes	No	No
Lynyrd Skynyrd	"Sweet Home Alabama"	Yes	No	Yes	Yes	Yes	Yes	Yes	Yes	Yes
Madonna	"Papa Don't Preach"	Yes	Yes	Yes	Yes	Yes	Yes	Yes	Yes	Yes
Marvin Gaye	"I Heard It Through the Grapevine"	Yes	No	Yes	Yes	Yes	Yes	No	Yes	Yes
Marvin Gaye	"What's Going On"	No	Yes	No	No	No	No	No	No	No
Michael McDonald	"I Keep Forgettin' (Every Time You're Near)"	No	Yes	No	No	No	No	No	No	No
Midnight Oil	"Beds Are Burning"	No	No	Yes	No	No	No	No	No	No
The Monkees	"Daydream Believer"	Yes	Yes	Yes	Yes	No	Yes	No	Yes	No
Neljä Ruusua	"Juppihippipunkkari"	No	No	No	No	No	No	Yes	No	No
Nirvana	"Smells Like Teen Spirit"	Yes	Yes	Yes	Yes	Yes	Yes	Yes	Yes	Yes
Patsy Cline	"Crazy"	Yes	Yes	No	No	No	Yes	No	Yes	No
Pelle Miljoona	"Moottoritie on kuuma"	No	No	No	No	No	No	Yes	No	No
Pet Shop Boys	"Always on My Mind"	Yes	No	Yes	Yes	Yes	Yes	Yes	Yes	Yes
PMMP	"Pikkuveli"	No	No	No	No	No	No	Yes	No	No
The Police	"Roxanne"	Yes	Yes	Yes	Yes	Yes	Yes	Yes	Yes	Yes
Pooh	"Uomini soli"	No	No	No	No	No	No	No	No	Yes
Popeda	"Pitkä kuuma kesä"	No	No	No	No	No	No	Yes	No	No
The Rasmus	"In the Shadows"	No	No	No	No	No	No	Yes	No	No
Rasmus Nøhr	"Sommer I Europa"	No	No	No	No	Yes	No	No	No	No
Ray Charles	"Hit the Road Jack"	No	Yes	No	No	No	No	No	No	No
The Righteous Brothers	"Unchained Melody"	Yes	Yes	Yes	Yes	Yes	Yes	Yes	No	No
The Rolling Stones	"Sympathy for the Devil"	Yes	Yes	No	Yes	Yes	Yes	No	Yes	Yes
Roxy Music	"Love Is the Drug"	Yes	No	No	No	No	Yes	No	Yes	No
Sam Cooke	"Wonderful World"	Yes	Yes	Yes	Yes	No	Yes	Yes	Yes	Yes
Samuli Edelmann & Sani	"Tuhat yötä"	No	No	No	No	No	No	Yes	No	No
Sanne Salomonsen	"Everybody's Eyes on You"	No	No	No	No	Yes	No	No	No	No
Silverchair	"Tomorrow"	No	No	Yes	No	No	No	No	No	No
The Smiths	"This Charming Man"	Yes	Yes	No	No	No	Yes	No	Yes	No
Söhne Mannheims	"Geh Davon Aus"	No	No	No	Yes	No	No	No	No	No
Suurlähettiläät	"Elokuun 11."	No	No	No	No	No	No	Yes	No	No
Swan Lee	"I Don't Mind"	No	No	No	No	Yes	No	No	No	No
Take That	"Back for Good"	No	No	No	Yes	No	No	No	No	No
Tina Turner	"What's Love Got to Do with It?"	Yes	Yes	Yes	Yes	Yes	Yes	Yes	Yes	Yes
Tom Jones	"What's New Pussycat?"	No	Yes	No	No	No	No	No	No	No
Tøsedrengene	"Si' Du Kan Li' Mig"	No	No	No	No	Yes	No	No	No	No
Die Toten Hosen	"1000 Gute Gründe"	No	No	No	Yes	No	No	No	No	No
Tue West	"Hun Er Fri (Kvinden Og Lottokuglerne)"	No	No	No	No	Yes	No	No	No	No
TV-2	"De Første Kærester På Månen"	No	No	No	No	Yes	No	No	No	No
U2	"Vertigo"	Yes	No	Yes	Yes	No	Yes	No	Yes	Yes
Whitney Houston	"The Greatest Love of All"	Yes	No	Yes	Yes	No	Yes	Yes	Yes	Yes
Whitney Houston	"I'm Your Baby Tonight"	No	Yes	No	No	No	No	No	No	No
Xavier Naidoo	"Wo Willst Du Hin?"	No	No	No	Yes	No	No	No	No	No
Yö	"Joutsenlaulu"	No	No	No	No	No	No	Yes	No	No
Zucchero	"Con le mani"	No	No	No	No	No	No	No	No	Yes
Zucchero	"Diamante"	No	No	No	No	No	No	No	No	Yes
Artist	Song title	UK	NA	AU	DE	DK	ES	FI	FR	IT

== SingStar Motown ==
Artist	Song title	UK
The Commodores	"Brick House"	Yes
The Commodores	"Easy"	Yes
The Contours	"Do You Love Me"	Yes
David Ruffin	"Put A Little Love In Your Heart"	Yes
Diana Ross & The Supremes	"Reflections"	Yes
The Four Tops	"Reach Out I'll Be There"	Yes
The Isley Brothers	"This Old Heart of Mine (Is Weak for You)"	Yes
The Jackson 5	"ABC"	Yes
Jimmy Ruffin	"What Becomes of the Broken Hearted"	Yes
Lionel Richie	"My Destiny"	Yes
Martha Reeves & the Vandellas	"Jimmy Mack"	Yes
Martha Reeves & the Vandellas	"Nowhere to Run"	Yes
Marvin Gaye	"Let's Get It On"	Yes
Marvin Gaye	"What's Going On"	Yes
Marvin Gaye & Kim Weston	"It Takes Two"	Yes
Mary Wells	"My Guy"	Yes
The Miracles	"Love Machine"	Yes
Rick James	"Super Freak"	Yes
Smokey Robinson	"Being with You"	Yes
Smokey Robinson and The Miracles	"The Tracks of My Tears"	Yes
Stevie Wonder	"For Once in My Life"	Yes
The Supremes	"You Can't Hurry Love"	Yes
The Temptations	"Get Ready"	Yes
The Temptations	"Papa Was a Rollin' Stone"	Yes
The Velvelettes	"Needle in A Haystack"	Yes
Artist	Song title	UK

== SingStar Party ==
(Titled SingStar NRJ Music Tour in France)

Artist	Song title	UK	DE	ES	FR	IT
883	"Come Mai"	No	No	No	No	Yes
African Connection	"Ami-Oh"	No	No	No	Yes	No
Alejandro Sanz	"No Es Lo Mismo"	No	No	Yes	No	No
Álex Ubago	"Sin Miedo A Nada"	No	No	Yes	No	No
Alexia	"Dimmi come..."	No	No	No	No	Yes
Alicia Keys	"Fallin'"	Yes	Yes	No	Yes	Yes
Anna Oxa	"Laisse Parler Les Gens!!!"	No	No	No	No	Yes
Ashford & Simpson	"Solid"	Yes	Yes	No	No	No
Aventura	"Obsesión"	No	No	No	Yes	No
Bananarama	"Venus"	No	Yes	No	No	No
The Beautiful South	"A Little Time"	Yes	No	No	No	No
Bill Withers	"Ain't No Sunshine"	Yes	Yes	No	No	Yes
Billy Crawford	"Bright Light"	No	No	No	Yes	No
Blu Cantrell	"Hit 'Em Up Style (Oops!)"	Yes	No	No	No	No
Bluvertigo	"Altre Forme Di Vita"	No	No	No	No	Yes
Bob Marley	"No Woman, No Cry"	Yes	Yes	No	Yes	Yes
Buggles	"Video Killed the Radio Star"	Yes	Yes	Yes	Yes	Yes
Busted	"Year 3000"	Yes	No	No	Yes	No
Café Quijano	"La Lola"	No	No	Yes	No	No
Coti	"Otra Vez"	No	No	Yes	No	No
Culture Club	"Do You Really Want to Hurt Me"	No	Yes	No	No	No
Cyndi Lauper	"Girls Just Wanna Have Fun"	Yes	Yes	No	Yes	Yes
Daniele Stefani	"Un Giorno D'amore"	No	No	No	No	Yes
David Bisbal	"Ave María"	No	No	Yes	No	No
David Bustamante & Alex	"Dos Hombres Y Un Destino"	No	No	Yes	No	No
David Lee Roth	"Just A Gigolo/I Ain't Got Nobody"	No	Yes	No	No	No
Destiny's Child	"Survivor"	Yes	Yes	No	Yes	Yes
Dido	"White Flag"	Yes	Yes	No	Yes	Yes
Dieter Thomas Kuhn	"Es war Sommer"	No	Yes	No	No	No
Dis L'heure 2 Zouk	"Laisse Parler Les Gens!!!"	No	No	No	Yes	No
Duncan Dhu	"En Algún Lugar"	No	No	Yes	No	No
Duran Duran	"Hungry Like the Wolf"	Yes	Yes	No	No	Yes
Edoardo Bennato	"Si Tratta Dell'amore"	No	No	No	No	Yes
Elton John & Kiki Dee	"Don't Go Breaking My Heart"	Yes	Yes	Yes	Yes	Yes
Elvis Presley	"Way Down"	Yes	Yes	No	No	No
Fangoria	"Retorciendo Palabras"	No	No	Yes	No	No
Fiorello	"Vivere A Colori"	No	No	No	No	Yes
The Foundations	"Build Me Up Buttercup"	Yes	Yes	Yes	Yes	Yes
Fran Perea	"Uno Más Uno Son Siete"	No	No	Yes	No	No
Franz Ferdinand	"Take Me Out"	Yes	No	No	Yes	Yes
George Michael	"Faith"	Yes	Yes	No	Yes	Yes
Irene Grandi	"Bambine Cattive"	No	No	No	No	Yes
Jamiroquai	"Cosmic Girl"	Yes	Yes	No	Yes	Yes
Jarabe de Palo	"Yin Yang"	No	No	Yes	No	No
Javine	"Real Things"	Yes	No	No	No	No
Juanes	"Es Por Ti"	No	No	Yes	No	No
Ketama	"Tú Volverás"	No	No	Yes	No	No
Klaus Lage	"1000 und 1 Nacht"	No	Yes	No	No	No
K-Maro	"Femme Like U"	No	No	No	Yes	No
Kylie Minogue	"I Should Be So Lucky"	Yes	Yes	No	Yes	No
Little Richard	"Tutti Frutti"	Yes	Yes	No	Yes	No
Loredana Bertè	"Il Mare D'inverno"	No	No	No	No	Yes
Lynnsha	"S'evader"	No	No	No	Yes	No
M Clan	"Carolina"	No	No	Yes	No	No
Maroon 5	"This Love"	Yes	Yes	No	Yes	Yes
Marta Sánchez	"Desesperada"	No	No	Yes	No	No
Miguel Bosé	"Amante Bandido"	No	No	Yes	No	No
Miguel Ríos	"Bienvenidos"	No	No	Yes	No	No
Mürfila	"Loko"	No	No	Yes	No	No
Nacha Pop	"La Chica de Ayer"	No	No	Yes	No	No
Nâdiya	"Et C'est Parti"	No	No	No	Yes	No
Nâdiya	"Parle-Moi"	No	No	No	Yes	No
Natasha Bedingfield	"Single"	Yes	No	No	No	No
New Model Army	"51st State of America"	No	Yes	No	No	No
Nino Bravo	"Un Beso Y Una Flor"	No	No	Yes	No	No
La Oreja de Van Gogh	"Rosas"	No	No	Yes	No	No
Paola e Chiara	"Blu"	No	No	No	No	Yes
Pearl	"J'ai Des Choses À Te Dire"	No	No	No	Yes	No
Pink	"Just Like a Pill"	Yes	Yes	Yes	Yes	Yes
The Police	"Every Breath You Take"	Yes	Yes	Yes	Yes	Yes
Presuntos Implicados	"Cómo Hemos Cambiado"	No	No	Yes	No	No
Revólver	"Si Es Tan Sólo Amor"	No	No	Yes	No	No
Rio Reiser	"König von Deutschland"	No	Yes	No	No	No
Roser	"Quiero Besarte"	No	No	Yes	No	No
Scissor Sisters	"Take Your Mama"	Yes	No	No	No	No
Seguridad Social	"Chiquilla"	No	No	Yes	No	No
Sonny & Cher	"I Got You Babe"	Yes	Yes	Yes	Yes	Yes
Spagna	"Gente come noi"	No	No	No	No	Yes
Spandau Ballet	"Gold"	Yes	Yes	No	No	No
Spice Girls	"Who Do You Think You Are"	Yes	Yes	No	Yes	Yes
Spider Murphy Gang	"Skandal im Sperrbezirk"	No	Yes	No	No	No
Tiffany	"I Think We're Alone Now"	Yes	No	No	No	No
Willy Denzey	"L'Orphelin"	No	No	No	Yes	No
Willy Denzey	"Le Mur Du Son"	No	No	No	Yes	No
Zeropositivo	"Fasi"	No	No	No	No	Yes
Artist	Song title	UK	DE	ES	FR	IT

== SingStar Pop ==
Known as SingStar Popworld in the UK, as Singstar - The Dome in Germany, as Singstar - Svenska Hits in Sweden and as SingStar Norske Hits in Norway.

Artist	Song title	UK	NA	AU	DE	ES	IT	NO	SE	NL
3 Doors Down	"Kryptonite"	No	Yes	No	No	No	No	No	No	No
Aeroplanitaliani	"Canzone D'amore"	No	No	No	No	No	Yes	No	No	No
Afro-dite	"Never Let It Go"	No	No	No	No	No	No	No	Yes	No
Afterhours	"Non È Per Sempre"	No	No	No	No	No	Yes	No	No	No
A-ha	"The Sun Always Shines on T.V."	No	No	No	No	No	No	Yes	No	No
A-ha	"Take On Me"	No	Yes	No	No	No	No	No	No	No
Alex Britti	"Oggi Sono Io"	No	No	No	No	No	Yes	No	No	No
Alexia	"Da Grande"	No	No	No	No	No	Yes	No	No	No
Alicia Keys	"Fallin'"	No	Yes	No	No	No	No	No	No	No
The All-American Rejects	"Move Along"	No	Yes	No	No	No	No	No	No	No
Amaral	"Sin Tí No Soy Nada"	No	No	No	No	Yes	No	No	No	No
Amaral	"El Universo Sobre Mí"	No	No	No	No	Yes	No	No	No	No
Amistades Peligrosas	"Estoy Por Tí"	No	No	No	No	Yes	No	No	No	No
Anna Book	"ABC"	No	No	No	No	No	No	No	Yes	No
Annett Louisan	"Das Spiel"	No	No	No	Yes	No	No	No	No	No
Annie	"Heartbeat"	Yes	No	No	No	No	No	Yes	No	Yes
Arne Schau Knudsen	"Gal Av Lengsel"	No	No	No	No	No	No	Yes	No	No
El Arrebato	"Búscate Un Hombre Que Te Quiera"	No	No	No	No	Yes	No	No	No	No
El Arrebato	"Una Noche Con Arte"	No	No	No	No	Yes	No	No	No	No
Arvingarna	"Eloise"	No	No	No	No	No	No	No	Yes	No
Ashlee Simpson	"Invisible"	No	Yes	No	No	No	No	No	No	No
Ashlee Simpson	"Pieces of Me"	Yes	No	Yes	Yes	No	No	No	No	Yes
Attack	"Ooa hela natten"	No	No	No	No	No	No	No	Yes	No
Avril Lavigne	"Sk8er Boi"	Yes	Yes	Yes	Yes	No	Yes	Yes	No	Yes
Barbados	"Kom hem"	No	No	No	No	No	No	No	Yes	No
Beyoncé	"Crazy in Love"	Yes	No	Yes	Yes	No	Yes	Yes	Yes	Yes
Biagio Antonacci	"Convivendo"	No	No	No	No	No	Yes	No	No	No
Bic Runga	"Sway"	No	No	Yes	No	No	No	No	No	No
Bigbang	"Girl In Oslo"	No	No	No	No	No	No	Yes	No	No
Black Eyed Peas	"Shut Up"	Yes	No	Yes	Yes	No	Yes	No	No	Yes
Blink-182	"What's My Age Again?"	Yes	No	Yes	Yes	No	Yes	Yes	Yes	Yes
Blue October	"Hate Me"	No	Yes	No	No	No	No	No	No	No
Britney Spears	"...Baby One More Time"	No	Yes	No	No	No	No	No	No	No
Camela	"Cuando Zarpa El Amor"	No	No	No	No	Yes	No	No	No	No
Carola	"Fångad av en stormvind"	No	No	No	No	No	No	No	Yes	No
Cartel	"Honestly"	No	Yes	No	No	No	No	No	No	No
Christian Walz	"Never Be Afraid Again"	No	No	No	No	No	No	No	Yes	No
The Clash	"Should I Stay or Should I Go"	Yes	Yes	Yes	Yes	Yes	No	Yes	Yes	Yes
Cyndi Lauper	"Girls Just Wanna Have Fun"	No	Yes	No	No	No	No	No	No	No
The Dandy Warhols	"Bohemian Like You"	Yes	No	Yes	Yes	No	Yes	No	No	Yes
Daniel Lindström	"Coming True"	No	No	No	No	No	No	No	Yes	No
Daniel Powter	"Bad Day"	No	Yes	No	No	No	No	No	No	No
Darin	"Money for Nothing"	No	No	No	No	No	No	No	Yes	No
David	"Wild at Heart"	No	No	No	No	No	No	Yes	No	No
David Bisbal	"Bulería"	No	No	No	No	Yes	No	No	No	No
David Bisbal	"Camina y Ven"	No	No	No	No	Yes	No	No	No	No
Delta Goodrem	"Born to Try"	No	No	Yes	No	No	No	No	No	No
Destiny's Child	"Survivor"	No	Yes	No	No	No	No	No	No	No
La Differenza	"Che Farò"	No	No	No	No	No	Yes	No	No	No
Dollie	"Lenge leve livet"	No	No	No	No	No	No	Yes	No	No
DumDum Boys	"Splinter Pine"	No	No	No	No	No	No	Yes	No	No
Elefantes	"Que Yo No Lo Sabía"	No	No	No	No	Yes	No	No	No	No
ELISA	"Luce"	No	No	No	No	No	Yes	No	No	No
Ella Baila Sola	"Cuando Los Sapos Bailen Flamenco"	No	No	No	No	Yes	No	No	No	No
Ella Baila Sola	"Lo Echamos A Suertes"	No	No	No	No	Yes	No	No	No	No
Eric B. & Rakim	"Paid in Full"	Yes	No	Yes	No	No	No	No	No	Yes
Evermore	"It's Too Late"	No	No	Yes	No	No	No	No	No	No
Die Fantastischen Vier	"Geboren"	No	No	No	Yes	No	No	No	No	No
Fountains of Wayne	"Stacy's Mom"	Yes	No	Yes	No	No	No	No	No	Yes
Francesco Renga	"Meravigliosa"	No	No	No	No	No	Yes	No	No	No
Franz Ferdinand	"Take Me Out"	No	Yes	No	No	No	No	No	No	No
The Fray	"Over My Head (Cable Car)"	No	Yes	No	No	No	No	No	No	No
Friends	"Lyssna Till Ditt Hjärta"	No	No	No	No	No	No	No	Yes	No
Gabinete Caligari	"La Culpa Fue Del Cha-Cha-Chá"	No	No	No	No	Yes	No	No	No	No
Girls Aloud	"Love Machine"	Yes	No	No	No	No	No	No	No	Yes
Good Charlotte	"I Just Wanna Live"	Yes	No	Yes	Yes	No	Yes	No	Yes	Yes
Gorillaz	"Feel Good Inc."	No	Yes	No	No	No	No	No	No	No
Héroes del Silencio	"Iberia Sumergida"	No	No	No	No	Yes	No	No	No	No
Héroes del Silencio	"Mar Adentro"	No	No	No	No	Yes	No	No	No	No
Hinder	"Lips Of An Angel"	No	Yes	No	No	No	No	No	No	No
The Hives	"Main Offender"	Yes	No	No	No	No	No	No	Yes	Yes
Hoobastank	"The Reason"	Yes	Yes	Yes	Yes	No	Yes	No	No	Yes
Iguana Tango	"Te Perdí"	No	No	No	No	Yes	No	No	No	No
INXS	"New Sensation"	No	No	Yes	No	No	No	No	No	No
Jaa9 & OnklP	"Kjendisparty"	No	No	No	No	No	No	Yes	No	No
Jamelia	"Stop"	Yes	No	Yes	Yes	No	No	No	No	Yes
James Blunt	"You're Beautiful"	No	Yes	No	No	No	No	No	No	No
Jan Eggum	"Pa An Igjen"	No	No	No	No	No	No	Yes	No	No
Jarabe de Palo	"La Flaca"	No	No	No	No	Yes	No	No	No	No
Jay Sean feat. Rishi Rich	"Eyes on You"	Yes	No	No	No	No	No	No	No	Yes
Jesse McCartney	"Beautiful Soul"	No	Yes	No	No	No	No	No	No	No
Jimmy Jansson	"Vi kan gunga"	No	No	No	No	No	No	No	Yes	No
Joss Stone	"Super Duper Love (Are You Diggin' on Me)"	Yes	No	No	Yes	No	Yes	Yes	No	Yes
Kaptein Sabeltann	"Vi Seiler Vår Egen Sjø"	No	No	No	No	No	No	Yes	No	No
Keane	"Somewhere Only We Know"	Yes	No	No	Yes	No	Yes	No	No	Yes
The Kids	"Forelska I Laerer'n"	No	No	No	No	No	No	Yes	No	No
Kine	"In The Air Tonight"	No	No	No	No	No	No	Yes	No	No
Kylie Minogue	"In Your Eyes"	Yes	No	Yes	Yes	No	Yes	Yes	Yes	Yes
Laith Al-Deen	"Alles an dir"	No	No	No	Yes	No	No	No	No	No
Lena Philipsson	"Det gör ont"	No	No	No	No	No	No	No	Yes	No
Lifehouse	"Hanging by a Moment"	No	Yes	No	No	No	No	No	No	No
Lisa Nilsson	"Himlen runt hörnet"	No	No	No	No	No	No	No	Yes	No
Loquillo y los Trogloditas	"Cadillac Solitario"	No	No	No	No	Yes	No	No	No	No
Los Ronaldos	"Idiota"	No	No	No	No	Yes	No	No	No	No
Magnus Uggla	"Värsta grymma tjejen"	No	No	No	No	No	No	No	Yes	No
Manfred Mann	"Do Wah Diddy Diddy"	Yes	No	Yes	Yes	No	No	Yes	Yes	Yes
Maria Mena	"My Lullaby"	No	No	No	No	No	No	Yes	No	No
Marilyn Manson	"Personal Jesus"	Yes	No	No	No	No	No	No	No	Yes
Martin Kesici	"Angel of Berlin"	No	No	No	Yes	No	No	No	No	No
Mauro Scocco	"Sarah"	No	No	No	No	No	No	No	Yes	No
McFly	"Obviously"	Yes	No	No	Yes	No	No	No	No	Yes
Melendi	"Caminando Por La Vida"	No	No	No	No	Yes	No	No	No	No
Melendi	"Con La Luna Llena"	No	No	No	No	Yes	No	No	No	No
Melendi	"Hablando En Plata"	No	No	No	No	Yes	No	No	No	No
Missy Higgins	"Scar"	No	No	Yes	No	No	No	No	No	No
The Monroes	"Sunday People"	No	No	No	No	No	No	Yes	No	No
My Chemical Romance	"Helena"	No	Yes	No	No	No	No	No	No	No
Natasha Bedingfield	"These Words"	Yes	Yes	Yes	Yes	No	No	No	No	Yes
Navajita Plateá	"Frío Sin Tí"	No	No	No	No	Yes	No	No	No	No
Navajita Plateá	"Noches de Bohemia"	No	No	No	No	Yes	No	No	No	No
Neffa	"Le Ore Piccole"	No	No	No	No	No	Yes	No	No	No
Negrita	"Magnolia"	No	No	No	No	No	Yes	No	No	No
Las Niñas	"Ojú"	No	No	No	No	Yes	No	No	No	No
Opus X	"Loving You Girl"	No	No	No	No	No	No	Yes	No	No
OutKast	"Roses"	Yes	No	Yes	Yes	No	Yes	No	Yes	Yes
Panic! at the Disco	"I Write Sins Not Tragedies"	No	Yes	No	No	No	No	No	No	No
Paola & Chiara	"A Modo Mio"	No	No	No	No	No	Yes	No	No	No
Pastora Soler	"Dámelo Ya"	No	No	No	No	Yes	No	No	No	No
Patrik Isaksson	"Hos dig är jag underbar"	No	No	No	No	No	No	No	Yes	No
Philip & Sandra	"Sommerflørt"	No	No	No	No	No	No	Yes	No	No
Pur	"Abenteuerland"	No	No	No	Yes	No	No	No	No	No
Queco	"Tengo"	No	No	No	No	Yes	No	No	No	No
The Raconteurs	"Steady, As She Goes"	No	Yes	No	No	No	No	No	No	No
Reamonn	"Supergirl"	No	No	No	Yes	No	No	No	No	No
Rihanna	"SOS"	No	Yes	No	No	No	No	No	No	No
Robbie Williams	"Let Me Entertain You"	Yes	No	Yes	Yes	No	Yes	Yes	Yes	Yes
Robbie Williams and Kylie Minogue	"Kids"	Yes	No	Yes	Yes	No	Yes	No	Yes	Yes
Robyn	"Show Me Love"	No	No	No	No	No	No	No	Yes	No
Ronan Keating feat. Yusuf Islam	"Father and Son"	Yes	No	Yes	Yes	No	Yes	No	No	Yes
Rosenstolz	"Willkommen"	No	No	No	Yes	No	No	No	No	No
Rune Rudberg	"Ut Mot Havet"	No	No	No	No	No	No	Yes	No	No
Ryan Cabrera	"On The Way Down"	No	Yes	No	No	No	No	No	No	No
Savage Garden	"To The Moon And Back"	No	No	Yes	No	No	No	No	No	No
The September When	"Cries Like A Baby"	No	No	No	No	No	No	Yes	No	No
Shannon Noll	"What About Me"	No	No	Yes	No	No	No	No	No	No
Sister Sledge	"We Are Family"	Yes	No	Yes	Yes	No	No	Yes	No	Yes
Snow Patrol	"Chasing Cars"	No	Yes	No	No	No	No	No	No	No
La Sonrisa de Julia	"Llevo Tu Voz"	No	No	No	No	Yes	No	No	No	No
Spazzys	"My Boyfriend's Back"	No	No	Yes	No	No	No	No	No	No
Sputnik	"Lukk Opp Din Hjertedør"	No	No	No	No	No	No	Yes	No	No
Steppenwolf	"Born To Be Wild"	Yes	No	Yes	Yes	No	No	Yes	Yes	Yes
Subsonica	"Tutti I Miei Sbagli"	No	No	No	No	No	Yes	No	No	No
Las Supremas de Móstoles	"Eres Un Enfermo"	No	No	No	No	Yes	No	No	No	No
Tine	"Vil Ha Deg"	No	No	No	No	No	No	Yes	No	No
Tiziano Ferro	"Sere Nere"	No	No	No	No	No	Yes	No	No	No
Tom Jones	"It's Not Unusual"	Yes	No	Yes	Yes	Yes	No	Yes	Yes	Yes
U2	"Vertigo"	No	Yes	No	No	No	No	No	No	No
Uno Svenningsson	"Under ytan"	No	No	No	No	No	No	No	Yes	No
Velvet	"Funzioni Primarie"	No	No	No	No	No	Yes	No	No	No
Whitney Houston	"I Wanna Dance With Somebody (Who Loves Me)"	No	Yes	No	No	No	No	No	No	No
Zucchero	"Baila"	No	No	No	No	No	Yes	No	No	No
Zucchero	"Il Grande Baboomba"	No	No	No	No	No	Yes	No	No	No
Artist	Song title	UK	NA	AU	DE	ES	IT	NO	SE	NL

== SingStar Pop Hits ==
Known as SingStar Eska Hity na Czasie in Poland

Artist	Song title	UK	AU	DE	DK	ES	FR	IT	PL	PT
4 Taste	"Sempre Que Te Vejo"	No	No	No	No	No	No	No	No	Yes
Ace of Base	"Life Is A Flower"	No	No	No	Yes	No	No	No	No	No
Adriana Partimpim	"Fico Assim Sem Você"	No	No	No	No	No	No	No	No	Yes
Akon	"Lonely"	Yes	Yes	No	No	No	Yes	Yes	Yes	No
Alejandro Sanz	"A La Primera Persona"	No	No	No	No	Yes	No	No	No	No
All Saints	"Black Coffee"	Yes	Yes	Yes	Yes	No	No	Yes	No	No
Amarguinhas	"Just Girls"	No	No	No	No	No	No	No	No	Yes
Ana Torroja	"Los Amantes"	No	No	No	No	Yes	No	No	No	No
Anaïs	"Mon Cœur Mon Amour"	No	No	No	No	No	Yes	No	No	No
André Sardet	"Foi Feitiço"	No	No	No	No	No	No	No	No	Yes
Andreas Johnson	"Glorious"	No	No	No	Yes	No	No	No	No	No
Ania	"Trudno Mi Się Przyznać"	No	No	No	No	No	No	No	Yes	No
Antonio Orozco	"Devuélveme La Vida"	No	No	No	No	Yes	No	No	No	No
Aqua	"Cartoon Heroes"	No	No	No	Yes	No	No	No	No	No
El Arrebato	"Duele"	No	No	No	No	Yes	No	No	No	No
Ashlee Simpson	"Boyfriend"	Yes	Yes	No	No	No	No	Yes	No	Yes
Avril Lavigne	"My Happy Ending"	Yes	Yes	Yes	No	No	No	Yes	No	Yes
Basshunter	"Boten Anna"	No	No	No	Yes	No	No	No	No	No
Boss AC	"Hip Hop (Sou Eu e És Tu)"	No	No	No	No	No	No	No	No	Yes
Bratisla Boys	"Stach Stach"	No	No	No	No	No	Yes	No	No	No
Britney Spears	"...Baby One More Time"	Yes	Yes	Yes	Yes	Yes	Yes	Yes	Yes	Yes
Bustamante	"Devuélveme La Vida"	No	No	No	No	Yes	No	No	No	No
La Caja de Pandora	"Acuérdate Bien De Mi Cara"	No	No	No	No	Yes	No	No	No	No
El Canto del Loco	"Volverá"	No	No	No	No	Yes	No	No	No	No
Cardigans	"Erase & Rewind"	No	No	No	Yes	No	No	No	No	No
Carlos Baute	"Te Regalo"	No	No	No	No	Yes	No	No	No	No
Cascada	"Everytime We Touch"	Yes	Yes	Yes	No	No	No	Yes	Yes	No
Chenoa	"Rutinas"	No	No	No	No	Yes	No	No	No	No
Christian Walz	"Wonderchild"	No	No	No	Yes	No	No	No	No	No
Clã	"Dançar na Corda Bamba"	No	No	No	No	No	No	No	No	Yes
Corneille	"Les marchands de rêves"	No	No	No	No	No	Yes	No	No	No
Corrine Bailey Rae	"Put Your Records On"	Yes	Yes	Yes	No	No	No	Yes	Yes	Yes
Coti	"Antes Que Ver El Sol"	No	No	No	No	Yes	No	No	No	No
Daniel Powter	"Bad Day"	Yes	Yes	Yes	Yes	No	No	Yes	No	Yes
Dannii Minogue	"I Begin To Wonder"	Yes	Yes	No	No	No	No	Yes	No	No
David Bisbal	"Quién Me Iba A Decir?"	No	No	No	No	Yes	No	No	No	No
David de María	"Despertaré Cuando Te Vayas"	No	No	No	No	Yes	No	No	No	No
David Fonseca	"The 80’s"	No	No	No	No	No	No	No	No	Yes
Diam's	"DJ"	No	No	No	No	No	Yes	No	No	No
Diam's	"Jeune demoiselle"	No	No	No	No	No	Yes	No	No	No
Diego Martín & Raquel del Rosario	"Déjame Verte"	No	No	No	No	Yes	No	No	No	No
Dover	"Let Me Out"	No	No	No	No	Yes	No	No	No	No
Drömhus	"Vill ha dej"	No	No	No	Yes	No	No	No	No	No
D'ZRT	"Para Mim Tanto Faz"	No	No	No	No	No	No	No	No	Yes
Eagle-Eye Cherry	"Save Tonight"	No	No	No	Yes	No	No	No	No	No
Edurne	"Amores Dormidos"	No	No	No	No	Yes	No	No	No	No
Effecto Mariposa & Javier Ojeda	"No Me Crees"	No	No	No	No	Yes	No	No	No	No
Evanescence	"Bring Me To Life"	Yes	Yes	Yes	No	No	No	Yes	Yes	Yes
Ewa Sonnet	"I RNB"	No	No	No	No	No	No	No	Yes	No
Fall Out Boy	"Dance, Dance"	Yes	Yes	No	No	No	No	Yes	No	No
Fangoria	"Criticar Por Criticar"	No	No	No	No	Yes	No	No	No	No
Fatal Bazooka	"Fous ta cagoule"	No	No	No	No	No	Yes	No	No	No
Fito y Fitipaldis	"Por La Boca Vive El Pez"	No	No	No	No	Yes	No	No	No	No
The Gift	"Fácil de Entender"	No	No	No	No	No	No	No	No	Yes
Girls Aloud	"No Good Advice"	Yes	Yes	Yes	No	No	No	Yes	No	No
Goldfrapp	"Ooh La La"	Yes	Yes	Yes	Yes	No	No	Yes	No	Yes
Gosia Andrzejewicz	"Pozwól Żyć"	No	No	No	No	No	No	No	Yes	No
Goya	"Smak Słów"	No	No	No	No	No	No	No	Yes	No
Hey	"A Ty?"	No	No	No	No	No	No	No	Yes	No
Hey	"Mimo Wszystko"	No	No	No	No	No	No	No	Yes	No
Infernal	"I Won't Be Crying"	No	No	No	Yes	No	No	No	No	No
Jamelia	"Beware Of The Dog"	Yes	Yes	No	Yes	No	No	Yes	No	No
James Morrison	"You Give Me Something"	Yes	Yes	Yes	No	No	No	Yes	No	No
Jan Delay	"Für Immer Und Dich"	No	No	Yes	No	No	No	No	No	No
Jane Fostin & Medhy Custos	"Pas de glace"	No	No	No	No	No	Yes	No	No	No
Jeden Osiem L	"Jak Zapomnieć"	No	No	No	No	No	No	No	Yes	No
Jennifer Lopez	"Jenny From The Block"	Yes	Yes	Yes	Yes	Yes	Yes	Yes	Yes	Yes
João Pedro Pais	"Louco Por Ti"	No	No	No	No	No	No	No	No	Yes
Johnny Deluxe	"Drenge Som Mig"	No	No	No	Yes	No	No	No	No	No
JoJo	"Leave (Get Out)"	Yes	Yes	No	No	No	No	Yes	No	Yes
Junior Senior	"Take My Time"	No	No	No	Yes	No	No	No	No	No
Kaolin	"Partons Vite"	No	No	No	No	No	Yes	No	No	No
Kasia Cerekwicka	"Na Kolana"	No	No	No	No	No	No	No	Yes	No
Kasia Cerekwicka	"Potrafię Kochać"	No	No	No	No	No	No	No	Yes	No
Kasia Klich	"Toksyczna Miłość"	No	No	No	No	No	No	No	Yes	No
Katerine	"Louxor J'Adore"	No	No	No	No	No	Yes	No	No	No
Kayah	"Testosteron"	No	No	No	No	No	No	No	Yes	No
Keane	"Crystal Ball"	No	Yes	No	No	No	No	No	No	No
K'Maro	"Histoires de luv"	No	No	No	No	No	Yes	No	No	No
Krzysztof Kiljański feat. Kayah	"Prócz Ciebie Nic"	No	No	No	No	No	No	No	Yes	No
Lââm	"Petite sœur"	No	No	No	No	No	Yes	No	No	No
Lemar	"It's Not That Easy"	Yes	No	Yes	No	No	No	Yes	No	No
Lerek feat. Nowator	"Moja Panienka"	No	No	No	No	No	No	No	Yes	No
Leslie	"Et j'attends"	No	No	No	No	No	Yes	No	No	No
Lily Allen	"Littlest Things"	Yes	Yes	No	Yes	No	No	Yes	No	No
Lynnsha feat. D. Dy	"Hommes...femmes"	No	No	No	No	No	Yes	No	No	No
Łzy	"Oczy Szeroko Zamknięte"	No	No	No	No	No	No	No	Yes	No
M. Pokora	"De retour"	No	No	No	No	No	Yes	No	No	No
Malú	"Toda"	No	No	No	No	Yes	No	No	No	No
Maria Mena	"You're the Only One"	No	No	No	Yes	No	No	No	No	No
Medhy Custos	"Elles demandent"	No	No	No	No	No	Yes	No	No	No
Melendi	"Quisiera Yo Saber"	No	No	No	No	Yes	No	No	No	No
Merche	"Bombón"	No	No	No	No	Yes	No	No	No	No
Mesa & Rui Reininho	"Luz Vaga"	No	No	No	No	No	No	No	No	Yes
Mezo / Tabb / Kasia Wilk	"Sacrum"	No	No	No	No	No	No	No	Yes	No
MIA.	"Tanz Der Moleküle"	No	No	Yes	No	No	No	No	No	No
Monika Brodka	"Znam Cię Na pamięć"	No	No	No	No	No	No	No	Yes	No
My Chemical Romance	"Helena"	Yes	Yes	No	No	No	No	Yes	No	No
Nâdiya	"Amies ennemies"	No	No	No	No	No	Yes	No	No	No
Nâdiya	"Roc"	No	No	No	No	No	Yes	No	No	No
Najoua Belyzel	"Gabriel"	No	No	No	No	No	Yes	No	No	No
Nelly Furtado feat. Timbaland	"Promiscuous"	Yes	Yes	Yes	Yes	No	No	Yes	Yes	Yes
Nena Daconte	"En Qué Estrella Estará?"	No	No	No	No	Yes	No	No	No	No
Ne-Yo	"Sexy Love"	No	Yes	No	No	No	No	No	No	No
Norah Jones	"Don't Know Why"	Yes	Yes	Yes	No	No	No	Yes	Yes	Yes
Olivia Ruiz	"La Femme Chocolat"	No	No	No	No	No	Yes	No	No	No
Olivia Ruiz	"J'traîne des pieds"	No	No	No	No	No	Yes	No	No	No
La Oreja de Van Gogh	"Dulce Locura"	No	No	No	No	Yes	No	No	No	No
Orson	"Bright Idea"	Yes	No	Yes	Yes	No	No	Yes	No	No
Paulo Gonzo & Olavo Bilac	"Jardins Proibidos"	No	No	No	No	No	No	No	No	Yes
Pereza	"Como Lo Tienes Tú"	No	No	No	No	Yes	No	No	No	No
Perle Lama	"Emmène-moi avec toi"	No	No	No	No	No	Yes	No	No	No
Pignoise	"Te Entiendo"	No	No	No	No	Yes	No	No	No	No
Pussycat Dolls	"Beep"	No	Yes	No	No	No	No	No	No	No
Razorlight	"Golden Touch"	Yes	No	No	Yes	No	No	Yes	No	No
Revolverheld	"Mit Dir Chill'n"	No	No	Yes	No	No	No	No	No	No
Rihanna	"SOS"	Yes	Yes	Yes	Yes	No	No	Yes	Yes	Yes
Rosenstolz	"Ich Geh In Flammen Auf"	No	No	Yes	No	No	No	No	No	No
Roxette	"I Wish I Could Fly"	No	No	No	Yes	No	No	No	No	No
Safri Duo	"Sweet Freedom"	No	No	No	Yes	No	No	No	No	No
Sanne Salomonsen	"You've Never Been Loved Before"	No	No	No	Yes	No	No	No	No	No
Scissor Sisters	"I Don't Feel Like Dancin'"	Yes	Yes	Yes	Yes	No	No	Yes	Yes	Yes
Sebastian Hämer	"Sommer Unseres Lebens"	No	No	Yes	No	No	No	No	No	No
Señor Trepador	"La Noche Me Resbala"	No	No	No	No	Yes	No	No	No	No
Shy'm	"Femme de couleur"	No	No	No	No	No	Yes	No	No	No
Shy'm	"Victoire"	No	No	No	No	No	Yes	No	No	No
Sinclair	"A Chaque Seconde"	No	No	No	No	No	Yes	No	No	No
Sinik feat. Vitaa	"Ne dis jamais"	No	No	No	No	No	Yes	No	No	No
Sistars	"Na Dwa"	No	No	No	No	No	No	No	Yes	No
El Sueño de Morfeo	"Nunca Volverá"	No	No	No	No	Yes	No	No	No	No
Sugababes	"Push The Button"	Yes	Yes	Yes	Yes	No	No	Yes	Yes	Yes
Sunrise Avenue	"Fairytale Gone Bad"	No	No	Yes	No	No	No	No	No	No
Superbus	"Butterfly"	No	No	No	No	No	Yes	No	No	No
Sylwia Wiśniewska	"12 Łez"	No	No	No	No	No	No	No	Yes	No
Titiyo	"Come Along"	No	No	No	Yes	No	No	No	No	No
Tobias Regner	"I Still Burn"	No	No	Yes	No	No	No	No	No	No
Toranja	"Carta"	No	No	No	No	No	No	No	No	Yes
Travis	"Sing"	Yes	Yes	Yes	No	No	No	Yes	No	Yes
U2	"Beautiful Day"	Yes	Yes	Yes	Yes	Yes	No	Yes	Yes	Yes
US5	"Mama"	No	No	Yes	No	No	No	No	No	No
Vitaa	"A fleur de toi"	No	No	No	No	No	Yes	No	No	No
Will Young	"Switch It On"	Yes	Yes	No	No	No	No	Yes	No	No
Wir sind Helden	"Aurélie"	No	No	Yes	No	No	No	No	No	No
Xavier Naidoo	"Zeilen Aus Gold"	No	No	Yes	No	No	No	No	No	No
Xutos & Pontapés	"Ai Se Ele Cai"	No	No	No	No	No	No	No	No	Yes
Artist	Song title	UK	AU	DE	DK	ES	FR	IT	PL	PT

== SingStar Pop Vol 2 ==
Artist	Song title	NA
3 Doors Down	"When I'm Gone"	Yes
Ashlee Simpson	"Boyfriend"	Yes
Avril Lavigne	"My Happy Ending"	Yes
Boys Like Girls	"The Great Escape"	Yes
Cartel	"Lose It"	Yes
Colbie Caillat	"Bubbly"	Yes
Dixie Chicks	"Not Ready to Make Nice"	Yes
Duran Duran	"Ordinary World"	Yes
Evanescence	"Bring Me To Life"	Yes
Fall Out Boy	"Thnks fr th Mmrs"	Yes
Fergie	"Big Girls Don't Cry"	Yes
Gwen Stefani feat. Akon	"The Sweet Escape"	Yes
The Hives	"Tick Tick Boom"	Yes
Jennifer Lopez	"Jenny From the Block"	Yes
Lifehouse	"First Time"	Yes
Lily Allen	"Littlest Things"	Yes
Lloyd	"Get it Shawty"	Yes
Maroon 5	"Makes Me Wonder"	Yes
Matchbox Twenty	"How Far We've Come"	Yes
Michelle Branch	"Breathe"	Yes
Nelly Furtado	"Promiscuous"	Yes
Norah Jones	"Don't Know Why"	Yes
The Outfield	"Your Love"	Yes
Peter Bjorn and John	"Young Folks"	Yes
P!nk	"Who Knew"	Yes
Plain White T's	"Hey There Delilah"	Yes
Rihanna	"Umbrella"	Yes
Santana feat. Chad Kroeger	"Into The Night"	Yes
Steriogram	"Walkie Talkie Man"	Yes
Sum 41	"Fat Lip"	Yes
Artist	Song title	NA

== SingStar Queen ==
Artist	Song title	UK	NA	DE	NL	DK/SE/NO/FI
Queen	"Another One Bites The Dust"	Yes	Yes	Yes	Yes	Yes
Queen	"Bicycle Race"	Yes	No	Yes	Yes	Yes
Queen	"Bohemian Rhapsody"	Yes	Yes	Yes	Yes	Yes
Queen	"Breakthru"	Yes	Yes	Yes	Yes	Yes
Queen	"Crazy Little Thing Called Love"	Yes	Yes	Yes	Yes	Yes
Queen	"Don't Stop Me Now"	Yes	Yes	Yes	Yes	Yes
Queen	"Fat Bottomed Girls"	Yes	Yes	Yes	Yes	Yes
Queen	"I Want It All"	Yes	Yes	Yes	Yes	Yes
Queen	"I Want To Break Free"	Yes	Yes	Yes	Yes	Yes
Queen	"Innuendo"	Yes	Yes	Yes	Yes	Yes
Queen	"One Vision"	Yes	Yes	Yes	Yes	Yes
Queen	"Play The Game"	Yes	Yes	Yes	Yes	Yes
Queen	"Save Me"	No	Yes	No	No	No
Queen	"Somebody To Love"	Yes	Yes	Yes	Yes	Yes
Queen	"These Are The Days Of Our Lives"	Yes	Yes	Yes	Yes	Yes
Queen	"Tie Your Mother Down"	Yes	Yes	Yes	Yes	Yes
Queen feat. David Bowie	"Under Pressure"	Yes	Yes	Yes	Yes	Yes
Queen	"We Are The Champions"	Yes	Yes	Yes	Yes	Yes
Queen	"We Will Rock You"	Yes	Yes	Yes	Yes	Yes
Queen	"Who Wants To Live Forever"	Yes	Yes	Yes	Yes	Yes
Queen	"You're My Best Friend"	Yes	Yes	Yes	Yes	Yes
Artist	Song title	UK	NA	DE	NL	DK/SE/NO/FI

== SingStar R&B ==
Artist	Song title	UK	PL
The 411	"Dumb"	Yes	No
Amerie	"1 Thing"	Yes	Yes
Amy Winehouse	"Back To Black"	Yes	Yes
Anastacia	"I'm Outta Love"	Yes	Yes
Andrzej Piaseczny	"...I jeszcze"	No	Yes
Ania	"Tego chcialam"	No	Yes
Ania Szarmach	"Silna"	No	Yes
Beverley Knight	"Come As You Are"	Yes	No
Black Eyed Peas	"Pump It"	Yes	Yes
Brodka	"Miales byc"	No	Yes
Chris Brown	"Yo (Excuse Me Miss)"	Yes	Yes
Christina Milian	"AM To PM"	Yes	No
Corinne Bailey Rae	"I'd Like To"	Yes	No
Destiny's Child	"Bootylicious"	Yes	Yes
Diana Ross & The Supremes	"Baby Love"	Yes	No
DJ Jazzy Jeff & The Fresh Prince	"Summertime"	Yes	Yes
Edwin Starr	"War"	Yes	No
En Vogue	"My Lovin' (You're Never Gonna Get It)"	Yes	No
The Four Tops	"I Can't Help Myself"	Yes	No
Gwen Stefani	"Hollaback Girl"	Yes	Yes
Inner City	"Good Life"	Yes	No
Jamelia	"Thank You"	Yes	No
Jamiroquai	"Alright"	Yes	Yes
Justyna Steczkowska	"Za kare"	No	Yes
Kasia Cerekwicka	"Ostatnia szansa"	No	Yes
Kasia Kowalska	"Prowadz mnie"	No	Yes
Kayah	"Supermenka"	No	Yes
Luther Vandross	"Never Too Much"	Yes	Yes
Mark Ronson feat. Daniel Merriweather	"Stop Me"	Yes	No
Martha Reeves & The Vandellas	"Dancing In The Street"	Yes	No
Marvin Gaye & Tammi Tarrell	"Ain't No Mountain High Enough"	Yes	No
Natalia Kukulska	"Im wiecej Ciebie tym mniej"	No	Yes
Nowator	"Przez chwile"	No	Yes
OutKast	"Idlewild Blue (Don'tchu Worry 'Bout Me)"	Yes	Yes
The Pussycat Dolls	"Buttons"	Yes	Yes
Rihanna	"We Ride"	Yes	Yes
Salt'N'Pepa	"Push It"	Yes	Yes
Sistars	"Skad ja Cie mam"	No	Yes
Stachursky	"Z kazdym twym oddechem"	No	Yes
Sugababes	"Ugly"	Yes	No
Tatiana & Blue Café	"You May Be In love"	No	Yes
Teka feat. Fame District	"Chodz do mnie"	No	Yes
Virgin	"Szansa"	No	Yes
Whitney Houston	"My Love Is Your Love"	Yes	Yes
Womack & Womack	"Teardrops"	Yes	No
Artist	Song title	UK	PL

== SingStar Rock Ballads ==
Artist	Song title	UK	NL
Air Supply	"All Out Of Love"	Yes	Yes
Alannah Myles	"Black Velvet"	Yes	Yes
Anastacia	"Left Outside Alone"	Yes	Yes
Avril Lavigne	"I'm With You"	Yes	Yes
Boston	"More Than A Feeling"	Yes	Yes
Boy Meets Girl	"Waiting For A Star To Fall"	Yes	Yes
The Calling	"Wherever You Will Go"	Yes	Yes
Cutting Crew	"(I Just) Died In Your Arms"	Yes	Yes
Cyndi Lauper	"Time After Time"	Yes	Yes
Duran Duran	"Ordinary World"	Yes	Yes
Europe	"Carrie"	Yes	Yes
Heart	"Alone"	Yes	Yes
Jon Secada	"Just Another Day (Without You)"	Yes	Yes
Lone Star	"Amazed"	Yes	Yes
Marc Cohn	"Walking In Memphis"	Yes	Yes
Meat Loaf	"I'd Do Anything For Love (But I Won't Do That)"	Yes	Yes
Mr Big	"To Be With You"	Yes	Yes
Mr Mister	"Broken Wings"	Yes	Yes
Mr Mister	"Kyrie"	Yes	Yes
Nickelback	"How You Remind Me"	Yes	Yes
Nilsson	"Without You"	Yes	Yes
Poison	"Every Rose Has Its Thorn"	Yes	Yes
Queen	"The Show Must Go On"	Yes	Yes
Roxette	"It Must Have Been Love"	Yes	Yes
Roxette	"Listen To Your Heart"	Yes	Yes
Starship	"Nothing's Gonna Stop Us Now"	Yes	Yes
Sugababes	"Too Lost In You"	Yes	Yes
Tina Arena	"Chains"	Yes	Yes
Toto	"Africa"	Yes	Yes
T'Pau	"China In Your Hand"	Yes	Yes
Artist	Song title	UK	NL

== SingStar Rocks! ==
Known as SingStar Rocks! TMF in the Netherlands and SingStar Rocks! RTÉ 2fm in Ireland.

Artist	Song title	UK	NA	AU	DE	ES	FR	HR	NL
Amaral	"Revolución"	No	No	No	No	Yes	No	No	No
Anouk	"Girl"	No	No	No	No	No	No	No	Yes
Anouk	"Nobody's Wife"	No	No	No	No	No	No	No	Yes
Aretha Franklin	"Respect"	No	Yes	No	No	No	No	No	No
Arkol	"Vingt ans"	No	No	No	No	No	Yes	No	No
Azra	"A Šta Da Radim (live)"	No	No	No	No	No	No	Yes	No
B-52s	"Love Shack"	No	Yes	No	No	No	No	No	No
Bare i Placenici	"Put Ka Sreci"	No	No	No	No	No	No	Yes	No
Barricada	"No Hay Tregua"	No	No	No	No	Yes	No	No	No
Bénabar	"Y'a une fille qu'habite chez moi"	No	No	No	No	No	Yes	No	No
Bloc Party	"Banquet"	Yes	Yes	No	No	No	Yes	No	Yes
Blur	"Song 2"	Yes	Yes	Yes	Yes	Yes	Yes	Yes	Yes
Bowling For Soup	"1985"	Yes	No	Yes	Yes	No	No	No	No
The Bravery	"An Honest Mistake"	Yes	No	No	No	No	No	Yes	No
El Canto del Loco	"Besos"	No	No	No	No	Yes	No	No	No
The Cardigans	"My Favourite Game"	Yes	No	Yes	No	No	No	Yes	Yes
Christina Stürmer	"Ich Lebe 2005"	No	No	No	Yes	No	No	No	No
The Church	"Unguarded Moment"	No	No	Yes	No	No	No	No	No
Coldplay	"Speed of Sound"	Yes	Yes	Yes	Yes	Yes	Yes	Yes	Yes
Cristina y los Subterráneos	"Voy En Un Coche"	No	No	No	No	Yes	No	No	No
The Cure	"Friday I'm in Love"	No	Yes	No	No	No	No	No	No
Ðavoli	"Stojim Na Kantunu"	No	No	No	No	No	No	Yes	No
De Kreuners	"Ik Wil Je"	No	No	No	No	No	No	No	Yes
Deep Purple	"Smoke On The Water"	Yes	No	Yes	Yes	No	No	Yes	Yes
Dionysos	"Tes lacets sont des fées"	No	No	No	No	No	Yes	No	No
Di-rect	"Adrenaline"	No	No	No	No	No	No	No	Yes
DJ Jazzy Jeff & The Fresh Prince	"Summertime"	No	Yes	No	No	No	No	No	No
Dolly	"C'est pour toi"	No	No	No	No	No	Yes	No	No
Dover	"Serenade"	No	No	No	No	Yes	No	No	No
Dragon	"April Sun In Cuba"	No	No	Yes	No	No	No	No	No
Dusty Springfield	"Son Of A Preacher Man"	No	Yes	No	No	No	No	No	No
Echt	"Du trägst keine Liebe in dir"	No	No	No	Yes	No	No	No	No
Elista	"Debout"	No	No	No	No	No	Yes	No	No
Elton John	"Rocket Man"	No	Yes	No	No	No	No	No	No
En Face	"S Dlana Boga Pala Si"	No	No	No	No	No	No	Yes	No
End of Fashion	"O Yeah"	No	No	Yes	No	No	No	No	No
Eskobar & Emma Daumas	"You Got Me"	No	No	No	No	No	Yes	No	No
The Exponents	"Why Does Love Do This To Me?"	No	No	Yes	No	No	No	No	No
Extreme	"More Than Words"	No	No	No	Yes	No	No	No	No
Extremoduro	"So Payaso"	No	No	No	No	Yes	No	No	No
Fall Out Boy	"Dance, Dance"	No	Yes	No	No	No	No	No	No
Fito y Fitipaldis	"La Casa por el Tejado"	No	No	No	No	Yes	No	No	No
Franz Ferdinand	"Do You Want To"	Yes	No	Yes	Yes	No	Yes	Yes	Yes
GANGgajang	"Sounds Of Then (This Is Australia)"	No	No	Yes	No	No	No	No	No
Gibonni	"Nek Se Dijete Zove Kao Ja"	No	No	No	No	No	No	Yes	No
Gloria Gaynor	"I Will Survive"	No	Yes	No	No	No	No	No	No
Golden Earring	"Radar Love"	No	No	No	No	No	No	No	Yes
Golden Earring	"Twilight Zone"	No	No	No	No	No	No	No	Yes
Good Charlotte	"Girls & Boys"	No	Yes	No	No	No	No	No	No
Grinspoon	"Hard Act To Follow"	No	No	Yes	No	No	No	No	No
Gustafi	"Sedan Dan"	No	No	No	No	No	No	Yes	No
Gwen Stefani	"Cool"	No	Yes	No	No	No	No	No	No
Gwen Stefani	"What You Waiting For?"	Yes	No	Yes	Yes	No	Yes	Yes	Yes
Hamlet	"Antes y Después"	No	No	No	No	Yes	No	No	No
Hard-Fi	"Hard to Beat"	Yes	No	No	No	No	No	No	No
Heideroosjes	"Iedereen Is Gek"	No	No	No	No	No	No	No	Yes
Héroes del Silencio	"Maldito Duende"	No	No	No	No	Yes	No	No	No
The Hives	"Hate to Say I Told You So"	Yes	Yes	No	No	No	No	Yes	No
Hladno Pivo	"Samo Za Taj Osjecaj"	No	No	No	No	No	No	Yes	No
Hladno Pivo	"Zimmer Frei"	No	No	No	No	No	No	Yes	No
Hole	"Celebrity Skin"	Yes	Yes	Yes	Yes	No	Yes	Yes	Yes
INXS	"Never Tear Us Apart"	No	No	Yes	No	No	No	No	No
Jet	"Are You Gonna Be My Girl?"	Yes	Yes	Yes	Yes	No	Yes	Yes	Yes
Joaquín Sabina	"El Blues De Lo Que Pasa En Mi Escalera"	No	No	No	No	Yes	No	No	No
Joss Stone	"Super Duper Love (Are You Diggin On Me?)"	No	Yes	No	No	No	No	No	No
Juli	"Perfekte Welle"	No	No	No	Yes	No	No	No	No
Kasabian	"Club Foot"	Yes	No	No	Yes	No	No	No	No
Keane	"Everybody's Changing"	Yes	Yes	No	Yes	Yes	Yes	No	Yes
The Killers	"Somebody Told Me"	Yes	Yes	Yes	Yes	No	Yes	Yes	Yes
Killing Heidi	"I Am"	No	No	Yes	No	No	No	No	No
Kings of Leon	"The Bucket"	Yes	No	No	No	No	No	No	No
Kinito	"La maison de disque"	No	No	No	No	No	Yes	No	No
KT Tunstall	"Black Horse And The Cherry Tree"	Yes	Yes	No	Yes	No	No	No	Yes
Kyo	"Dernière danse"	No	No	No	No	No	Yes	No	No
Kyo feat. Sita	"Le chemin"	No	No	No	No	No	Yes	No	No
Laufer	"Svijet Za Nas"	No	No	No	No	No	No	Yes	No
Let 3	"Kontinento"	No	No	No	No	No	No	Yes	No
Loquillo y los Trogloditas	"El Ritmo del Garaje"	No	No	No	No	Yes	No	No	No
Los Piratas	"Promesas Que No Valen Nada"	No	No	No	No	Yes	No	No	No
Los Rodríguez	"Palabras Más, Palabras Menos"	No	No	No	No	Yes	No	No	No
Lynyrd Skynyrd	"Sweet Home Alabama"	No	Yes	No	No	No	No	No	No
M	"Je dis aime"	No	No	No	No	No	Yes	No	No
Mägo de Oz	"La Costa del Silencio"	No	No	No	No	Yes	No	No	No
Marea	"Ciudad de los Gitanos"	No	No	No	No	Yes	No	No	No
Marvin Gaye	"I Heard It Through the Grapevine"	No	Yes	No	No	No	No	No	No
Mass Hysteria	"Remède"	No	No	No	No	No	Yes	No	No
Matthias Reim	"Verdammt, Ich Lieb Dich"	No	No	No	Yes	No	No	No	No
Maxïmo Park	"Apply Some Pressure"	Yes	No	No	No	No	No	No	No
M-Clan	"Sopa Fría"	No	No	No	No	Yes	No	No	No
Medina Azahara	"Necesito Respirar"	No	No	No	No	Yes	No	No	No
Men at Work	"Down Under"	No	No	Yes	No	No	No	No	No
Miossec	"Je m'en vais"	No	No	No	No	No	Yes	No	No
Naked Eyes	"(There's) Always Something There to Remind Me"	No	Yes	No	No	No	No	No	No
Nirvana	"Come As You Are"	Yes	No	Yes	Yes	Yes	Yes	Yes	Yes
The Offspring	"Self Esteem"	Yes	Yes	Yes	Yes	Yes	Yes	No	Yes
Parni Valjak	"Lutka za bal (live)"	No	No	No	No	No	No	Yes	No
Pereza	"Pienso en Aquella Tarde"	No	No	No	No	Yes	No	No	No
Peter Koelewijn	"Kom Van Dat Dak Af"	No	No	No	No	No	No	No	Yes
Platero y Tú	"Juliette"	No	No	No	No	Yes	No	No	No
The Police	"Every Breath You Take"	No	Yes	No	No	No	No	No	No
Porretas	"Pongamos Que Hablo de Madrid"	No	No	No	No	Yes	No	No	No
Powderfinger	"(Baby I've Got You) On My Mind"	No	No	Yes	No	No	No	No	No
Powderfinger	"These Days"	No	No	Yes	No	No	No	No	No
Prljavo Kazalište	"Heroj Ulice"	No	No	No	No	No	No	Yes	No
Psihomodo Pop	"Ja Volim Samog Sebe"	No	No	No	No	No	No	Yes	No
Queen	"Don't Stop Me Now"	Yes	No	No	Yes	No	No	No	Yes
Queens of the Stone Age	"Go With The Flow"	Yes	No	No	No	No	No	Yes	Yes
Raphaël	"Caravane"	No	No	No	No	No	Yes	No	No
Razorlight	"Somewhere Else"	Yes	No	No	Yes	No	No	No	No
Revolverheld	"Die Welt Steht Still"	No	No	No	Yes	No	No	No	No
The Rolling Stones	"Paint It, Black"	Yes	Yes	Yes	Yes	Yes	Yes	Yes	Yes
Rosendo	"Vaya Ejemplar de Primavera"	No	No	No	No	Yes	No	No	No
Rosenstolz	"Es Könnt' Ein Anfang Sein"	No	No	No	Yes	No	No	No	No
Scissor Sisters	"Take Your Mama"	No	Yes	No	No	No	No	No	No
Scorpions	"Wind Of Change"	Yes	Yes	Yes	Yes	No	No	Yes	Yes
The Screaming Jets	"Better"	No	No	Yes	No	No	No	No	No
Seguridad Social	"Quiero Tener Tu Presencia"	No	No	No	No	Yes	No	No	No
Selig	"Ist Es Wichtig?"	No	No	No	Yes	No	No	No	No
Shocking Blue	"Venus"	No	No	No	No	No	No	No	Yes
Silmarils	"Vas y avoir du sport"	No	No	No	No	No	Yes	No	No
Sinclair	"Ca m'fait plus mal"	No	No	No	No	No	Yes	No	No
Sinclair	"Supernova superstar"	No	No	No	No	No	Yes	No	No
Siniestro Total	"¿Quiénes Somos? ¿De Dónde Venimos? ¿A Dónde Vamos?"	No	No	No	No	Yes	No	No	No
Snow Patrol	"Run"	Yes	No	No	No	No	No	Yes	No
Sôber	"Arrepentido"	No	No	No	No	Yes	No	No	No
Soulwax	"Caramel"	No	No	No	No	No	No	No	Yes
Stash	"Sadness"	No	No	No	No	No	No	No	Yes
Stereophonics	"Dakota"	Yes	No	Yes	No	No	No	No	No
Superbus	"Radio Song"	No	No	No	No	No	Yes	No	No
The Swingers	"Counting The Beat"	No	No	Yes	No	No	No	No	No
Têtes Raides	"Fragile"	No	No	No	No	No	Yes	No	No
Thin Lizzy	"The Boys Are Back in Town"	Yes	Yes	Yes	Yes	No	No	No	Yes
Tocotronic	"This Boy Is Tocotronic"	No	No	No	Yes	No	No	No	No
The Undertones	"Teenage Kicks"	Yes	No	No	Yes	No	No	No	No
The Veronicas	"4ever"	No	No	Yes	No	No	No	No	No
Vještice	"Totalno Drukciji Od Drugih"	No	No	No	No	No	No	Yes	No
The White Stripes	"Blue Orchid"	No	Yes	No	No	No	No	No	No
Wir sind Helden	"Denkmal"	No	No	No	Yes	No	No	No	No
Zadruga	"Mala Cici"	No	No	No	No	No	No	Yes	No
Artist	Song title	UK	NA	AU	DE	ES	FR	HR	NL

== SingStar Singalong With Disney ==
Movie	Song title	UK
101 Dalmatians	"Cruella De Vil"	Yes
Aladdin	"A Whole New World"	Yes
The Aristocats	"Ev'rybody Wants To Be A Cat"	Yes
Beauty And The Beast	"Beauty And The Beast"	Yes
Cinderella	"Bibbidi-Bobbidi-Boo"	Yes
Cinderella	"The Work Song"	Yes
The Jungle Book	"Bare Necessities"	Yes
The Jungle Book	"I Wanna Be Like You"	Yes
Lady and the Tramp	"He's A Tramp"	Yes
The Lion King	"I Just Can't Wait To Be King"	Yes
The Lion King	"The Circle Of Life"	Yes
The Little Mermaid	"Kiss The Girl"	Yes
The Little Mermaid	"Under The Sea"	Yes
Peter Pan	"Following The Leader"	Yes
Peter Pan	"You Can Fly! You Can Fly! You Can Fly!"	Yes
Sleeping Beauty	"I Wonder"	Yes
Sleeping Beauty	"Once Upon A Dream"	Yes
Tarzan	"Son Of Man"	Yes
Toy Story	"You've Got A Friend In Me"	Yes
Winnie The Pooh	"Winnie The Pooh"	Yes
Artist	Song title	UK

== SingStar Studio 100 ==
This game was only released in the Netherlands and Belgium.

Artist	Song title	NL	BE
Amika	Amika	Yes	Yes
Amika	Het is zomer	Yes	Yes
Het Huis Anubis	Het geheim	Yes	Yes
Het Huis Anubis	Het huis anubis	Yes	Yes
Het Huis Anubis	Het pad der 7 zonden	Yes	Yes
K3	Alle kleuren	Yes	Yes
K3	Kuma hè	Yes	Yes
K3	Kusjesdag	Yes	Yes
K3	Oya lèlè	Yes	Yes
K3	Ya ya yippee	Yes	Yes
K3	Toveren	Yes	Yes
Kabouter Plop	Het ploplied	Yes	Yes
Kabouter Plop	Kabouterdans	Yes	Yes
Kabouter Plop	Lalala	Yes	Yes
Kabouter Plop	Sjoebi doebi dabidee	Yes	Yes
Mega Mindy	Ik ben Mega Mindy	Yes	Yes
Mega Mindy	Mega mindy tijd	Yes	Yes
Mega Mindy	Tijd voor Mega Mindy	Yes	Yes
Piet Piraat	Halloween	Yes	Yes
Piet Piraat	Piet piraat	Yes	Yes
Piet Piraat	Piet piraat is op vakantie	Yes	Yes
Piet Piraat	Storm op zee	Yes	Yes
Samson en Gert	De wereld is mooi	Yes	Yes
Samson en Gert	Samsonrock	Yes	Yes
Samson en Gert	Vrede op aarde	Yes	Yes
Artist	Song title	NL	BE

== SingStar Summer Party (known as SingStar Party Hits in Australia) ==
Artist	Song title	UK	AU	DE	ES	NL	PL	PT	DK
2 Unlimited	"No Limit"	No	No	No	No	Yes	No	No	No
2raumwohnung	"Besser Geht's Nicht"	No	No	Yes	No	No	No	No	No
Adele	"Chasing Pavements"	Yes	No	Yes	No	Yes	No	No	No
Álex Ubago	"Viajar Contigo"	No	No	No	Yes	No	No	No	No
Alphabeat	"10.000 Nights Of Thunder"	No	No	No	No	No	No	No	Yes
Alphabeat	"Fascination"	No	No	No	No	No	No	No	Yes
Amy Winehouse	"Tears Dry On Their Own"	Yes	Yes	Yes	Yes	Yes	Yes	Yes	Yes
Andy y Lucas	"Son de Amores"	No	No	No	Yes	No	No	No	No
Anjos	"Eu Estou Aqui (Yo sou aquél)"	No	No	No	No	No	No	Yes	No
Antonio Orozco	"Dime Porqué"	No	No	No	Yes	No	No	No	No
Aqua	"Dr. Jones"	No	No	No	No	No	No	No	Yes
Ash	"Girl From Mars"	No	Yes	No	No	No	No	No	No
Bliglad	"Dans For Satan"	No	No	No	No	No	No	No	Yes
Bliglad	"Kærlighed Til Folket"	No	No	No	No	No	No	No	Yes
Blondie	"The Tide Is High"	Yes	Yes	No	No	Yes	Yes	No	No
Blur	"Girls & Boys"	Yes	Yes	No	Yes	No	Yes	Yes	Yes
Booty Luv	"Shine"	Yes	No	No	No	No	No	No	No
Boys	"Szalona"	No	No	No	No	No	Yes	No	No
Brathanki	"Czerwone korale"	No	No	No	No	No	Yes	No	No
Burhan G	"Who Is He?"	No	No	No	No	No	No	No	Yes
El Canto del Loco	"Zapatillas"	No	No	No	Yes	No	No	No	No
moi Caprice	"To the Lighthouse"	No	No	No	No	No	No	No	Yes
Celtas Cortos	"Cuéntame Un Cuento"	No	No	No	Yes	No	No	No	No
Chenoa	"Todo Irá Bien"	No	No	No	Yes	No	No	No	No
Chesney Hawkes	"The One And Only"	Yes	No	Yes	No	Yes	No	No	Yes
Chumbawamba	"Tubthumping"	No	No	Yes	No	No	No	No	No
Clã	"Tira A Teima"	No	No	No	No	No	No	Yes	No
Coti	"Canción de Adios"	No	No	No	Yes	No	No	No	No
Culcha Candela	"Hamma"	No	No	Yes	No	No	No	No	No
Da Weasel	"Dúia"	No	No	No	No	No	No	Yes	No
David Bowie	"Let's Dance"	Yes	Yes	Yes	Yes	Yes	Yes	Yes	Yes
David de María	"Precisamente Ahora"	No	No	No	Yes	No	No	No	No
David Fonseca	"Superstars II"	No	No	No	No	No	No	Yes	No
Diana Ross	"I'm Coming Out"	Yes	Yes	Yes	No	Yes	Yes	No	Yes
Di-Rect	"Cool Without You"	No	No	No	No	Yes	No	No	No
Dirty Pretty Things	"Bang Bang You're Dead"	Yes	No	No	No	No	No	No	No
Dodgy	"Good Enough"	Yes	No	Yes	Yes	No	No	Yes	No
Dolly Dots	"Radio"	No	No	No	No	Yes	No	No	No
Donna Summer	"She Works Hard for the Money"	No	No	Yes	No	No	No	No	No
Edyta Górniak	"Jestem kobieta"	No	No	No	No	No	Yes	No	No
Elton John	"I'm Still Standing"	Yes	Yes	Yes	No	Yes	Yes	No	Yes
Evermore	"Light Surrounding You"	No	Yes	No	No	No	No	No	No
Faith No More	"Easy"	No	No	Yes	No	No	No	No	No
Fito y Fitipaldis	"Me Equivocaría Otra Vez"	No	No	No	Yes	No	No	No	No
Five Star	"System Addict"	Yes	No	No	No	No	No	No	No
The Flames	"Everytime"	No	No	Yes	No	No	No	No	No
Formacja Niezywych Schabuff	"Lato"	No	No	No	No	No	Yes	No	No
Frans Bauer	"Heb Je Even Voor Mij?"	No	No	No	No	Yes	No	No	No
George Baker Selection	"Little Green Bag"	No	No	No	No	Yes	No	No	No
The Gift	"Ok! Do You Want Something Simple?"	No	No	No	No	No	No	Yes	No
The Gift	"Question Of Love"	No	No	No	No	No	No	Yes	No
Girls Aloud	"Call The Shots"	Yes	Yes	No	No	Yes	No	No	No
Golden Earring	"When The Lady Smiles"	No	No	No	No	Yes	No	No	No
Gomo	"Feeling Alive"	No	No	No	No	No	No	Yes	No
Gordon	"Ik Bel Je Zomaar Even Op"	No	No	No	No	Yes	No	No	No
Guus Meeuwis & Vagant	"Het is een nacht (live)"	No	No	No	No	Yes	No	No	No
Hombres G	"Chico, Tienes Que Cuidarte"	No	No	No	Yes	No	No	No	No
Humanos	"Maria Albertina"	No	No	No	No	No	No	Yes	No
Ich + Ich	"Vom Selben Stern"	No	No	Yes	No	No	No	No	No
Iguana Tango	"Extraño"	No	No	No	Yes	No	No	No	No
Infernal	"From Paris to Berlin"	No	No	No	No	No	No	No	Yes
Jack Radics	"No Matter"	No	No	Yes	No	No	No	No	No
Jannes	"Ga Maar Weg"	No	No	No	No	Yes	No	No	No
Jaula de Grillos	"Adiós"	No	No	No	Yes	No	No	No	No
Joe Cocker	"Summer in the City"	No	No	Yes	No	No	No	No	No
Juanes	"Me Enamora"	No	No	No	Yes	No	No	No	No
Just 5	"Kolorowe sny"	No	No	No	No	No	Yes	No	No
K.A.S.A	"Maczo"	No	No	No	No	No	Yes	No	No
K.A.S.A	"To wlasnie lato"	No	No	No	No	No	Yes	No	No
Kaiser Chiefs	"I Predict A Riot"	Yes	No	Yes	Yes	Yes	No	No	No
Kasia Cerekwicka	"S.O.S"	No	No	No	No	No	Yes	No	No
Kasia Kowalska	"Cos optymistycznego"	No	No	No	No	No	Yes	No	No
Klaxons	"It's Not Over Yet"	Yes	Yes	No	Yes	No	No	No	No
Kombi	"Pokolenie"	No	No	No	No	No	Yes	No	No
Kombi	"Sen sie spelni"	No	No	No	No	No	Yes	No	No
Krzysztof Krawczyk	"Bo jestes Ty"	No	No	No	No	No	Yes	No	No
KT Tunstall	"Suddenly I See"	Yes	Yes	Yes	No	No	No	Yes	Yes
Lou Bega	"Mambo No. 5"	Yes	Yes	No	Yes	Yes	Yes	Yes	No
Lzy	"Agnieszka"	No	No	No	No	No	Yes	No	No
Lzy	"Narcyz sie nazywam"	No	No	No	No	No	Yes	No	No
Madness	"House Of Fun"	Yes	Yes	No	No	No	No	Yes	No
Mafalda Veiga & João Pedro Pais	"Tatuagens"	No	No	No	No	No	No	Yes	No
Magtens Korridorer	"Nordhavn Station"	No	No	No	No	No	No	No	Yes
Mel & Kim	"Respectable"	Yes	Yes	No	No	Yes	No	Yes	Yes
Melendi	"Con Solo Una Sonrisa"	No	No	No	Yes	No	No	No	No
Mika	"Big Girl (You Are Beautiful)"	Yes	Yes	Yes	No	Yes	No	Yes	No
Mundo Secreto	"Põe Aquele Som"	No	No	No	No	No	No	Yes	No
Myslovitz	"Dlugosc dzwieku samotnosci"	No	No	No	No	No	Yes	No	No
Natasja feat. Pharfar	"Ildebrand I Byen"	No	No	No	No	No	No	No	Yes
Natasja	"Op med Ho'det"	No	No	No	No	No	No	No	Yes
Nena Daconte	"Marta"	No	No	No	Yes	No	No	No	No
Norbi	"Kobiety sa gorace"	No	No	No	No	No	Yes	No	No
Norbi feat. Krzysztof Krawczyk	"Piekny dzien"	No	No	No	No	No	Yes	No	No
Ohrbooten	"Man Lebt Nur Einmal"	No	No	Yes	No	No	No	No	No
Operator Please	"Get What You Want"	No	Yes	No	No	No	No	No	No
La Oreja de Van Gogh	"En Mi Lado del Sofá"	No	No	No	Yes	No	No	No	No
Pastora Soler	"Corazón Congelado"	No	No	No	Yes	No	No	No	No
Pedro Abrunhosa e Bandemónio	"Não Posso +"	No	No	No	No	No	No	Yes	No
Peter André	"Mysterious Girl"	Yes	Yes	Yes	No	Yes	Yes	No	Yes
Plain White T's	"Hey There Delilah"	Yes	Yes	Yes	Yes	No	No	Yes	No
Pulp	"Disco 2000"	Yes	Yes	Yes	No	No	No	Yes	Yes
Razorlight	"In The Morning"	Yes	No	No	No	No	No	No	Yes
Reni Jusis	"Zakrecona"	No	No	No	No	No	Yes	No	No
Republica	"Ready To Go"	No	Yes	No	No	No	No	No	No
Ricardo Azevedo	"Pequeno T2"	No	No	No	No	No	No	Yes	No
Ricki Lee	"Can't Touch It"	No	Yes	No	No	No	No	No	No
Rihanna	"Umbrella"	Yes	Yes	Yes	Yes	Yes	Yes	Yes	Yes
Rollo & King	"Der står et billed' af dig på mit bord"	No	No	No	No	No	No	No	Yes
Roger Cicero	"Die Liste"	No	No	Yes	No	No	No	No	No
Rooney	"When Did Your Heart Go Missing?"	No	No	Yes	No	No	No	No	No
Seguridad Social	"Me Siento Bien"	No	No	No	Yes	No	No	No	No
Shannon Noll	"Loud"	No	Yes	No	No	No	No	No	No
Spleen Utd	"Spleen United"	No	No	No	No	No	No	No	Yes
El Sueño de Morfeo	"Demasiado Tarde"	No	No	No	Yes	No	No	No	No
Sugababes	"Red Dress"	Yes	Yes	No	No	Yes	Yes	Yes	Yes
T.T.	"Dança Este Som"	No	No	No	No	No	No	Yes	No
Tam Tam Go	"Atrapados En La Red"	No	No	No	Yes	No	No	No	No
Texas	"Summer Son"	Yes	Yes	Yes	Yes	Yes	No	Yes	No
Thirsty Merc	"20 Good Reasons"	No	Yes	No	No	No	No	No	No
Thomas Buttenschön	"Fantastiske Mandag"	No	No	No	No	No	No	No	Yes
Tiago Bettencourt & Mantha	"Canção Simples"	No	No	No	No	No	No	Yes	No
Tokio Hotel	"An Deiner Seite (Ich Bin Da)"	No	No	Yes	No	No	No	No	No
Toto	"Hold The Line"	Yes	Yes	Yes	No	Yes	No	No	Yes
Troels Gustavsen	"Times (Blue Signs)"	No	No	No	No	No	No	No	Yes
Varius Manx	"Orla Cien"	No	No	No	No	No	Yes	No	No
The Veronicas	"Hook Me Up"	No	Yes	No	No	No	Yes	No	No
Wham!	"Club Tropicana"	Yes	Yes	Yes	No	Yes	Yes	No	No
Wolter Kroes	"Ik Heb De Hele Nacht Liggen Dromen"	No	No	No	No	Yes	No	No	No
Xutos e Pontapés	"Circo De Feras"	No	No	No	No	No	No	Yes	No
Yazz	"The Only Way Is Up"	Yes	Yes	No	No	Yes	No	Yes	Yes
Artist	Song title	UK	AU	DE	ES	NL	PL	PT	DK

== SingStar Take That ==
Artist	Song title	UK
Take That	"Babe"	Yes
Take That	"Back For Good"	Yes
Take That	"Beautiful World"	Yes
Take That	"Could It Be Magic"	Yes
Take That	"Do What U Like"	Yes
Take That	"Everything Changes"	Yes
Take That	"Greatest Day"	Yes
Take That	"Hold Up A Light"	Yes
Take That	"I'd Wait For Life"	Yes
Take That	"It Only Takes A Minute"	Yes
Take That	"Love Ain't Here Anymore"	Yes
Take That	"A Million Love Songs"	Yes
Take That	"Never Forget"	Yes
Take That	"Once You've Tasted Love"	Yes
Take That	"Patience"	Yes
Take That	"Pray"	Yes
Take That	"Promises"	Yes
Take That	"Reach Out"	Yes
Take That	"Rule The World"	Yes
Take That	"Said It All"	Yes
Take That	"Shine"	Yes
Take That	"Sure"	Yes
Take That	"Up All Night"	Yes
Take That	"Why Can't I Wake Up With You"	Yes
Take That feat. Lulu	"Relight My Fire"	Yes
Artist	Song title	UK

== SingStar The Wiggles ==
Artist	Song title	AU
The Wiggles	"Can You (Point Your Fingers And Do The Twist)"	Yes
The Wiggles	"Dr Knickerbocker"	Yes
The Wiggles	"Fruit Salad"	Yes
The Wiggles	"Get Ready to Wiggle"	Yes
The Wiggles	"Getting Strong!"	Yes
The Wiggles feat. Jamie Redfern	"Hot Poppin' Popcorn"	Yes
The Wiggles	"Hot Potato"	Yes
The Wiggles	"I'm Dorothy the Dinosaur!"	Yes
The Wiggles	"Lights, Camera, Action, Wiggles!"	Yes
The Wiggles	"Move Your Arms Like Henry"	Yes
The Wiggles	"Play Your Guitar With Murray"	Yes
The Wiggles	"Captain Feathersword Fell Asleep on His Pirate Ship (Quack Quack)"	Yes
The Wiggles	"Rock-A-Bye Your Bear"	Yes
The Wiggles	"The Monkey Dance"	Yes
The Wiggles	"The Shimmie Shake!"	Yes
The Wiggles	"To Have A Tea Party"	Yes
The Wiggles	"Toot Toot, Chugga Chugga, Big Red Car"	Yes
The Wiggles	"Twinkle, Twinkle, Little Star"	Yes
The Wiggles	"Wags the Dog Is Chasing His Tail"	Yes
The Wiggles	"Wake Up Jeff!"	Yes
Artist	Song title	AU

== See also ==
- List of songs in SingStar games (PlayStation 3)
