= Rocky Mountain (Janne Lucas song) =

1981 single by Janne Lucas

Single by Janne Lucas

from the album Rocky Mountain
- Language: Swedish
- B-side: "Dallas"
- Released: 1981
- Genre: Rock
- Label: Mariann
- Songwriters: Janne Lucas; Göran Ledstedt

Janne Lucas singles chronology
| "Mot alla vindar" (1980) | "Rocky Mountain" (1981) | "Tätt intill" (1982) |

Audio
- "Rocky Mountain" on YouTube

"Rocky Mountain" is a song by Swedish singer-songwriter Janne Lucas from his sixth studio album of the same name (1981). Persson performed the song at Melodifestivalen 1981, where it finished in third place. It was written by Persson and Göran Ledstedt. The single peaked at number 14 on Sverigetopplistan.

== Credits and personnel ==
- Janne Lucas – songwriter, vocals
- Göran Ledstedt – songwriter
- Lennart Karlsmyr – engineering
- Åke Grahn – engineering
- Torgny Söderberg – engineering, arranger

Credits and personnel adapted from the Rocky Mountain album and 7-inch single liner notes.

== Charts ==
Weekly chart performance for "Rocky Mountain"
| Chart (1981) | Peak position |
|---|---|
| Sweden (Sverigetopplistan) | 14 |
