= Karen Busck =

Danish singer and songwriter

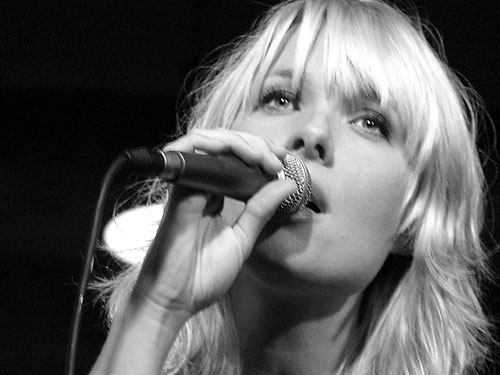
- Karen Busck

Background information
- Birth name: Karen Busck
- Born: 5 January 1975 (age 50)
- Origin: Aarhus, Denmark
- Genres: Alternative, pop rock
- Instrument(s): Guitar, singing
- Years active: 2001–present

Karen Busck (born 5 January 1975) is a Danish singer and songwriter who debuted with the album Hjertet ser in 2001, sung with Erann DD. She has been a judge on the Danish reality TV-contest Stjerne for en aften in 2003. She has a degree as a teacher of music from the Royal Academy of Music, Aarhus/Aalborg.

== Discography ==
- Hjertet ser (2001)
- By (2003)
- En kærlighedsaffære (2008)
