= Janne Lucas Persson =

Swedish singer, songwriter and musician (born 1947)

Janne Lucas
- Born: Jan Lars Persson; 3 October 1947 (age 78); Gothenburg, Sweden
- Occupations: Singer; songwriter; musician
- Musical career
- Genres: Rock; pop; gospel; schlager
- Instruments: Vocals; piano
- Label: Mariann
- Formerly of: Lucas

Jan Lars Persson (born 3 October 1947), known by his stage name Janne Lucas, is a Swedish singer, songwriter and musician. He is best known as the lead vocalist and primary lyricist of pop band Lucas.

== Early life ==
Janne Lucas was born Jan Persson in Gothenburg, Sweden, on 3 October 1947. As a child, he spent time in Frillesås, where his grandparents lived.

== Career ==
=== 1965–1969: Lucas ===
At the age of 18, Persson formed a pop group, Lucas. The group's name came from one of Persson's friends who thought that if you could call a pop group something as Tages, Lucas would work as a name too. The group was characterized by his skilful piano playing and singing. The group's breakthrough came two years later, in 1967, when they won Sveriges Radio's Pop Band Competition, and charted on Tio i Topp with the song "Antisocial Season". The band had its first success with a cover version of The Moody Blues' song "Go Now", originally recorded by Bessie Banks in 1964. Lucas' single was one of the most popular songs in Sweden in 1968. The song peaked at No. 2 on Tio i Topp where it stayed for 8 weeks.

Later in 1967, the Swedish newspaper Bildjournalen released its own vinyl record, on which Lucas was featured with their song "Touring". The band made several successful tours in Scandinavia throughout their career, playing as an opening act for The Rolling Stones in Helsingborg and for Jimi Hendrix at Liseberg.

As pop bands became less popular in the late 1960s, Lucas disbanded in 1969.

=== 1969–present: Solo career ===
As Lucas disbanded in 1969, Persson pursued a solo career. Persson played the piano on Pugh Rogefeldt's 1973 album Pugh on the Rocks. In the early 1970s, Persson moved to Las Palmas where he played the piano in the house band of a whiskey club. The Swedish music manager Stig Anderson contacted Persson, who wanted him to go on a summer tour together with Ted Gärdestad and Lena Andersson. Persson accepted and returned to Sweden.

Janne Lucas participated at Melodifestivalen 1980 with the song "Växeln hallå", coming in second. The upcoming year he participated with the song "Rocky Mountain", ending up third.

For many years, Janne Lucas also acted as pianist for Vi i femman.

Janne also accompanied the vocal group Noviserna for a while, where Anna-Lisa Cederquist participated. In a Bildjournalen issue was a commercial record with, among others, the band Lucas and the song One Night Stand.

On 6 November 2009, he participated at Doobidoo in SVT, playing "Växeln hallå" on the piano. He is also the choral director for the Onsala and Mölnlycke Gospel Choir.

== Discography ==
Solo

- Grand Piano (1973)
- Ad Lib (1977)
- Born to Rock (1978)
- Solfeggietto (1978)
- Rocky Mountain (1981)
- Boeves psalm (1982)
- Jag vill, jag törs, jag kan (1984)
- White Christmas (1988)

Lucas

- Lucas (1969)
