= Formacja Nieżywych Schabuff =

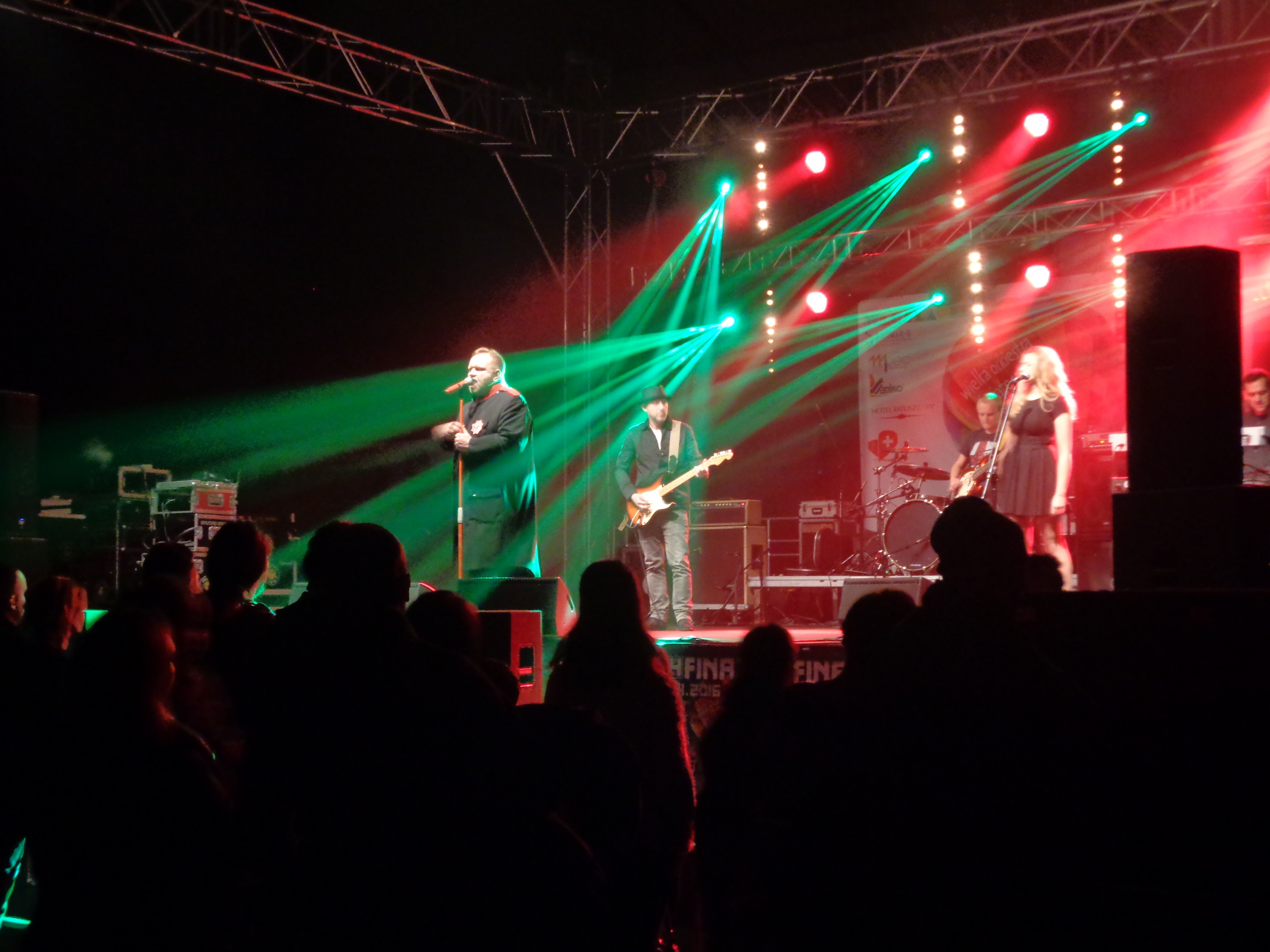
- Włocławek-Concert of FNS

Background information
- Origin: Częstochowa, Poland
- Genres: Pop
- Years active: 1985–present
- Labels: Wifon, Koch International Poland, Zic Zac, BMG Poland, Universal Music Poland, Dream Music, Agencja Artystyczna MTJ, My Music
- Members: Aleksander Klepacz; Jacek Otręba; Marcin Pożarlik; Marcin Serwaciński; Wojciech Wierus; Edyta Rusak
- Past members: Robert Bielecki; Katarzyna Lach; Rafał Łuszczyk; Jacek Pałucha

Formacja Nieżywych Schabuff – Polish pop band formed in 1985 in Częstochowa.

== Discography ==
=== Studio albums ===
Title	Album details	Peak chart positions
Title	Album details	POL
Wiązanka melodii młodzieżowych	Released: 1989; Label: Wifon; Formats: CD, CS	—
Schaby	Released: 1991; Label: Zic Zac; Formats: CD, CS	—
Urodziny	Released: 1993; Label: D'art Corporation; Formats: CD, CS	—
Nasze piosenki najlepsze	Released: 1994; Label: Intersonus; Formats: CD, CS	—
Fantomas	Released: 1995; Label: Zic Zac; Formats: CD, CS	—
Foto	Released: 1998; Label: Pomaton EMI; Formats: CD, CS	—
Supermarket	Released: March 10, 2003; Label: Universal Music Poland; Formats: CD	—
24h	Released: June 6, 2008; Label: Dream Music; Formats: CD	36
"—" denotes a recording that did not chart or was not released in that territory.

=== Compilation albums ===
Title	Album details
Z archiwum X-lecia	Released: Jun 19, 1999; Label: Pomaton EMI; Formats: CD, CS
Gold	Released: 2000; Label: Koch International Poland; Formats: CD
Złota kolekcja: Klub wesołego szampana	Released: September 29, 2001; Label: Pomaton EMI; Formats: CD
Gwiazdy XX Wieku: Formacja Nieżywych Schabuff	Released: June 28, 2004; Label: BMG Poland; Formats: CD
