= Erann DD =

Danish singer

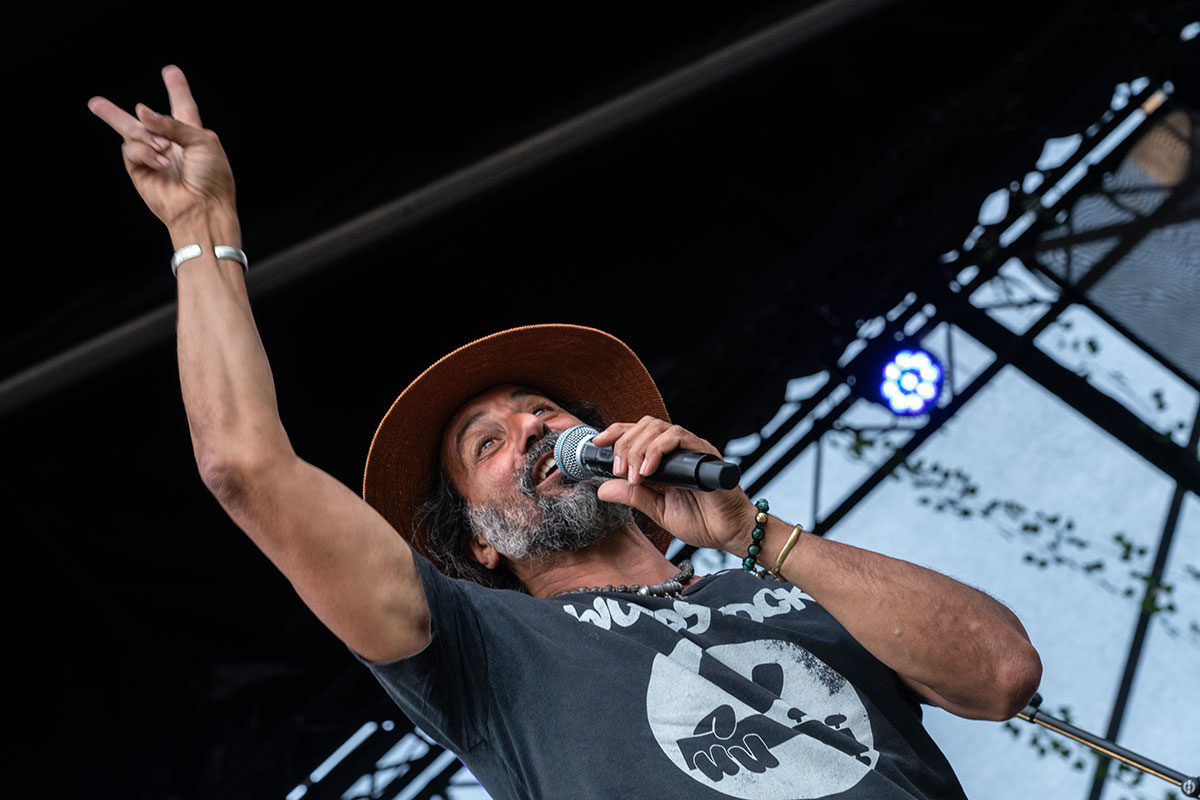

Background information
- Born: Erann David Drori; 7 September 1967 (age 58); Copenhagen, Denmark
- Genres: Pop, soul, funk
- Occupation(s): Singer, songwriter, record producer
- Years active: 1992 – present
- Labels: Mega, Columbia/Sony Music, EMI
- Website: www.erann.com

Erann David Drori (born 7 September 1967), better known as Erann DD, is a Danish singer and songwriter of Yemeni-Jewish origin.

== Career ==
As a 12-year-old, Erann was sent to a religious school in Israel for three years. After dropping out of high school, he started singing in a funk band Zapp Zapp in the early 1990s. From 1995 to 1996, he released two albums with the duo Drori-Hansen Furniture made up of Erann on vocals and Casper Hansen on bass guitar.

Erann debuted as a solo artist with the double platinum-selling album Still Believing in 2000, which sold more than 125,000 copies. In 2001 he was nominated for 5 Danish Music Awards and won the one for the Best New Danish Act". In 2001 he sang a duet with Karen Busck called "Hjertet ser" from Buscks album of the same name. In 2003 the Erann album That's the Way for Me was picked at the Folkegaven 2004 for writing the song "When You Hold Me" dedicated to the wedding of Frederik, Crown Prince of Denmark and Princess Mary, the Crown Princess on 14 May 2004. The song debuted at number one on airplay list, and upon commercial release also hit No. 1 on the Danish Singles Chart.

On 28 August 2006, Erann DD released his third album, called Erann, and on 26 October 2009 his fourth album, Byen kalder being his first album in Danish.

In May 2011, he released the single "Fell in Love" on Eranns own company, Fox Off Production. The song was written in collaboration with Nik & Jay, and produced by house producer team Deeper People. "Fell in Love" was the first single from Erann's fifth studio album produced by Jon & Jules.

Erann voiced Felix in the Danish dub of the 2021 Disney film Encanto.

Erann DD is married to designer Lizette Mikkelsen, with whom he has three children, including Ella Augusta.

== Discography ==
=== Albums ===
in Zapp Zapp

- 1992: What Does Fish Is...?
- 1993: You Better Believe

in Drori-Hansen Furniture

- 1995: For Their Friends
- 1996: Family

as Erann DD (solo)

Year	Song	Peak position	Certification	Notes
Year	Song	DK	Certification	Notes
2001	Still Believing	1		
2003	That's the Way for Me	1		
2006	Erann DD	3		
2009	Byen kalder	8		

Live albums

- 2000: Live

Compilation albums

Year	Song	Peak position	Certification	Notes
Year	Song	DK	Certification	Notes
2012	Greatest Hits	3		

=== Singles ===
Year	Single	Peak position	Album
Year	Single	DAN	Album
2004	"When You Hold Me"	1	
