= Roser (singer) =

Spanish pop singer with four LPs (born 1979)

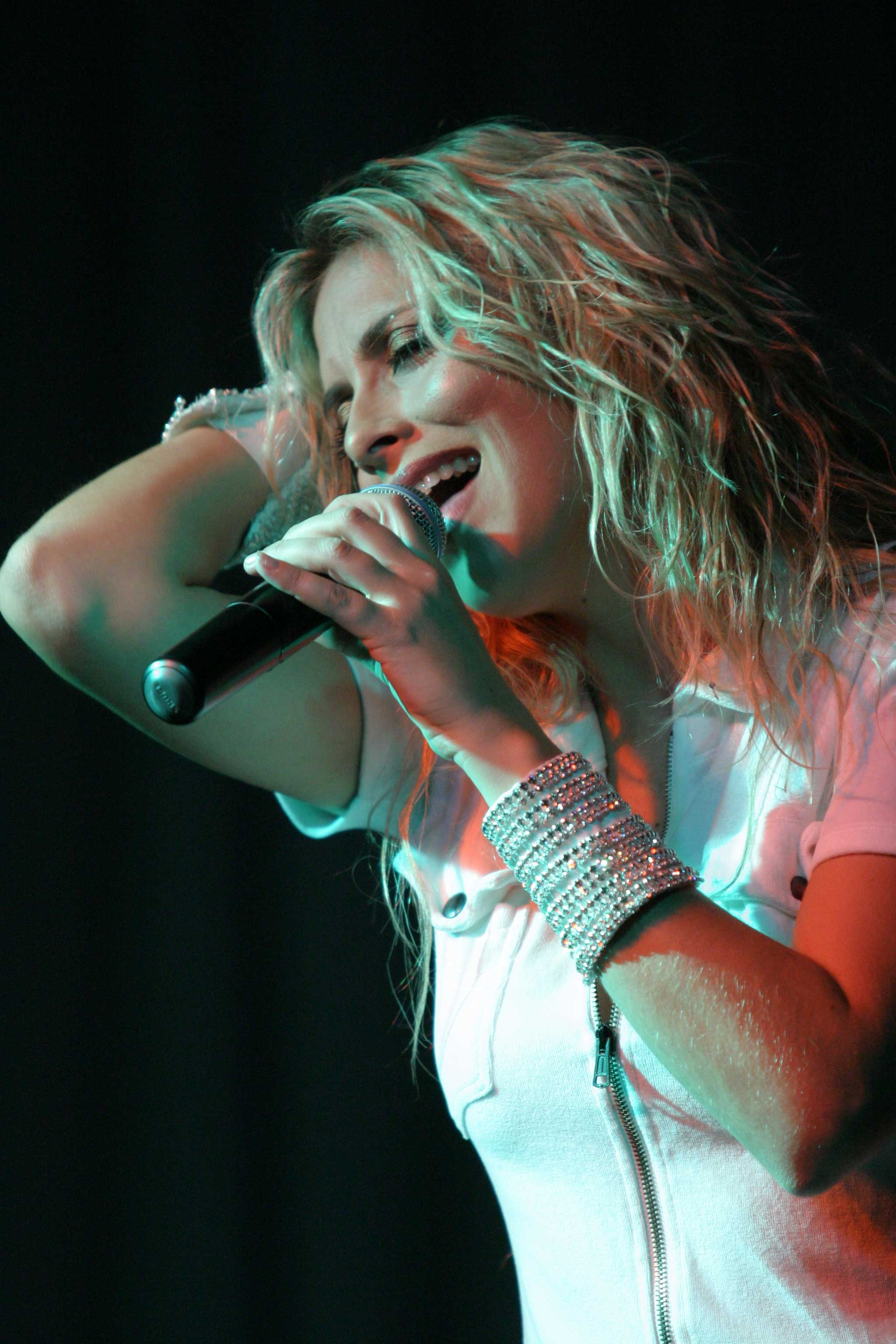
- Roser in a concert

Background information
- Also known as: Roser
- Born: Roser Murillo Ribera; May 9, 1979 (age 47); Canet de Mar, Barcelona, Spain
- Genres: Pop, dance
- Occupations: Singer, songwriter, record producer, dancer, actress
- Instrument: Vocals
- Years active: 2002–present
- Labels: The Rojo Music; Warner Music Spain
- Website: rosermusic.com

Roser is a Spanish pop singer with four LPs.

Roser rose to fame in 2002 after participating in Spanish channel Telecinco's reality television programme Popstars.

== Discography ==
- 2003: Desperté (100,000 copies sold)
- 2004: Fuego (50,000 copies sold)
- 2006: Raffaella (20,000 copies sold)
- 2010: Clandestino (5,000 copies sold)

=== Videoclips ===
- No vuelvas (2003)
- Quiero besarte (2003)
- Dueña de mi corazón (2003)
- Foc (version Catalan of "Fuego" - 2004)
- Fuego (2004)
- Boca a boca (2004)
- La trampa (2004)
- Rumore (2006)
- La Bestia (2009)
- La Bèstia (version in Catalan of "La Bestia" - 2009)
- Solo en ti (2010)
- Només tu (version in Catalan of "Solo en ti" - 2010)

=== Tours ===
- 2003: Gira Desperté (45 concerts)
- 2004-2005: Gira Fuego (73 concerts)
- 2006-2008: Gira Raffaella (51 Concerts)
