= Hallå hela pressen =

1982 Chattanooga song

Single by Chattanooga
- A-side: "Chattanooga"
- B-side: "Himmel och helvete"
- Released: 1982
- Genre: Schlager
- Label: Mylabel
- Songwriters: Ackie Kempff; Mia Kempff; Strix Q

"Hallå hela pressen" is a song written by Mia Kempff, Ackie Kempff and Strix Q, and performed by Chattanooga at Melodifestivalen 1982, ending up 4th.

At the Swedish singles chart the song peaked at second position in Sweden, and fourth position in Norway.

The song charted at Svensktoppen for eight weeks between 28 March-16 May 1982, topping the chart during the first week.

A 2004 recording by Nina & Kim together with Chattanooga peaked at 7th position at the Swedish singles chart.

The 1982 Chattanooga single is one of the titles in the book Tusen svenska klassiker (2009).

== Charts ==
=== Chattanooga version ===
Chart (1982)	Peak position
Norway (VG-lista)	4
Sweden (Sverigetopplistan)	3

=== Nina & Kim with Chattanooga version ===
Chart (2004)	Peak position
Sweden (Sverigetopplistan]])	14
