= Chattanooga (band) =

Pop trio from Halmstad, Sweden

- Origin: Halmstad, Sweden
- Years active: early 1980s
- Past members: Mia, Ackie, Clara Kempff

Chattanooga was a pop trio consisting of the Mia, Ackie and Clara Kempff sisters from Halmstad in Sweden. Scoring chart successes during the early 1980s. they participated at Melodifestivalen 1982 with the song "Hallå hela pressen", it ended up 4th.

In 2004, the trio was temporarily united to rerecord "Hallå hela pressen" together with Nina & Kim.

== Discography ==
=== Albums ===
- Stoppa pressarna - 1982
- Glimten i ögat - 1983

=== Singles ===
- Hallå hela pressen/Himmel och helvete
- På jakt/Bitterljuva tårar
- Kan inte stanna, kan inte gå/Leka med pojkar
- Ute på vift/Längtans ateljé
- På fri fot (promosingle)
- Låt oss få ha våra drömmar ifred/Skyddsängel (maxisingle)
