= Växeln hallå =

1980 single by Janne Lucas

Single by Janne Lucas
- Language: Swedish
- B-side: "Minimotorbike"
- Released: 1980
- Genre: Pop
- Label: Mariann
- Songwriters: Lasse Holm; Gert Lengstrand

Janne Lucas singles chronology
"Minimotorbike" (1980)	"Växeln hallå" (1980)	"Mot alla vindar" (1980)

Audio
- "Växeln hallå" on YouTube

"Växeln hallå" is a song written by Lasse Holm (music) and Gert Lengstrand (lyrics), and performed by Janne "Lucas" Persson ending up 2nd at Melodifestivalen 1980.

The single peaked at 6th place at the Swedish singles chart. The song also stayed at Svensktoppen for ten weeks between the period of 30 March-1 June 1980, spending three weeks at the top.

The song was also recorded as "Doctor hallo".

== Cover versions and usage in media ==
Swedish heavy metal band "Black Ingvars" recorded the song for their 1998 album Schlager Metal.

== Credits and personnel ==
- Janne Lucas – vocals
- Lasse Holm – songwriter
- Gert Lengstrand – songwriter

Credits and personnel adapted from the 7-inch single liner notes.

== Charts ==
Weekly chart performance for "Växeln hallå"
Chart (1980)	Peak position
Sweden (Sverigetopplistan)	6
