= List of songs in SingStar games (PlayStation 3) =

SingStar is a competitive music video game series, developed by London Studio and published by Sony Computer Entertainment for the PlayStation 2 and PlayStation 3 video game consoles. SingStar allows 1–2 people to sing karaoke via microphone peripherals in time with on-screen music. The first game in the series, SingStar, was released in Europe and Oceania in 2004. As of 2008, over seventy titles in the SingStar series have been released PAL region territories, in addition to a small number of releases in North America.

The main difference between each SingStar title is the game's track list. Each edition of the game includes up to thirty songs on disc, with PlayStation 3 versions of the game allowing additional songs to be purchased from an online service. Players can remove a game disc from the console during gameplay and insert a new disc, giving them access to a new selection of songs. Most SingStar titles are loosely based upon musical genres, such as rock or pop music (SingStar Rocks! and SingStar Pop respectively). SingStar games are sometimes localised for release in different regions, with customised track lists to suit foreign markets and territories. The first artist-specific SingStar game (SingStar Die Toten Hosen) was released in Germany in 2007, with ABBA, Queen, Take That, Mecano and Vasco Rossi receiving similar releases in subsequent years.

== PlayStation 3 ==
The following tables list songs available on SingStar titles released for the PlayStation 3 video game console. Country of released is indicated by two-letter country codes. With the exception of localised titles, all games released in PAL territories have identical track lists to the UK version of the game. For titles which were localised for multiple markets, songs are either indicated as present ("Yes") or absent ("No") in the track list for each localised version.

=== SingStar ===
Songs featured in SingStar (PS3)
Artist	Song title	UK	US	DE	ES	FR	NO
Alejandro Sanz	Corazón partío"	No	No	No	Yes	No	No
Alexander With	"The Other Side"	No	No	No	No	No	Yes
Amy Winehouse	"Back To Black"	No	Yes	No	No	No	No
Ana Torroja	"No me canso"	No	No	No	Yes	No	No
Anaïs	"Mon Cœur Mon Amour"	No	No	No	No	Yes	No
Andrés Calamaro	"Estadio Azteca"	No	No	No	Yes	No	No
The Automatic	"Monster"	Yes	Yes	No	No	No	No
Beck	"Loser"	No	Yes	No	No	No	No
Bjørn Eidsvåg & Elvira Nikolaisen	"Floden"	No	No	No	No	No	Yes
Blind Melon	"No Rain"	No	Yes	No	No	No	No
Blink-182	"All The Small Things"	Yes	Yes	Yes	Yes	No	No
Blur	"Coffee & TV"	Yes	No	No	No	No	No
Britney Spears	"Toxic"	Yes	Yes	Yes	Yes	Yes	Yes
Camille	"Paris"	No	No	No	No	Yes	No
El Canto Del Loco	"Ya nada volverá a ser como antes"	No	No	No	Yes	No	No
The Cardigans	"Lovefool"	Yes	Yes	Yes	Yes	Yes	Yes
Chambao	"Pokito a poko"	No	No	No	Yes	No	No
Charlotte Gainsbourg	"The Songs That We Sing"	No	No	No	No	Yes	No
Christina Stürmer	"Nie Genug"	No	No	Yes	No	No	No
Coldplay	"Clocks"	No	Yes	No	No	No	No
Coldplay	"Fix You"	Yes	No	Yes	Yes	Yes	Yes
Corinne Bailey Rae	"Put Your Records On"	No	Yes	No	No	No	No
Daft Punk	"One More Time"	No	No	No	No	Yes	No
Dave Matthews Band	"Crash Into Me"	No	Yes	No	No	No	No
David Bowie	"Let's Dance"	No	Yes	No	No	No	No
Deluxe	"Que no"	No	No	No	Yes	No	No
Depeche Mode	"Precious"	No	No	Yes	No	No	No
Elvira Nikolaisen	"Love I Can't Defend"	No	No	No	No	No	Yes
Faith No More	"Epic"	No	Yes	No	No	No	No
Fangoria	"No sé qué me das"	No	No	No	Yes	No	No
Fito & Fitipaldis	"Soldadito marinero"	No	No	No	Yes	No	No
Fools Garden	"Lemon Tree"	No	No	Yes	No	No	No
Franz Ferdinand	"Do You Want To"	No	Yes	No	No	No	No
The Fratellis	"Chelsea Dagger"	Yes	No	No	No	No	No
Gaute Ormåsen	"Kjærlighet er mer enn forelskelse"	No	No	No	No	No	Yes
Gorillaz	"Feel Good, Inc."	Yes	No	Yes	No	Yes	Yes
Gwen Stefani	"Cool"	Yes	No	Yes	No	Yes	No
Iván Ferreiro	"Turnedo"	No	No	No	Yes	No	No
Jane's Addiction	"Been Caught Stealing"	No	Yes	No	No	No	No
Joaquín Sabina	"19 días y 500 noches"	No	No	No	Yes	No	No
Junior Senior	"Move Your Feet"	Yes	No	Yes	No	Yes	No
Kaizers Orchestra	"Maestro"	No	No	No	No	No	Yes
Kaolin	"Partons Vite"	No	No	No	No	Yes	No
Karpe Diem	"Piano"	No	No	No	No	No	Yes
Karpe Diem	"Show"	No	No	No	No	No	Yes
Katerine	"Louxor J'Adore"	No	No	No	No	Yes	No
The Killers	"Mr. Brightside"	Yes	Yes	No	Yes	Yes	No
Lilyjets	"Perfect Picture"	No	No	No	No	No	Yes
Loquillo y Trogloditas	"Feo, fuerte y formal"	No	No	No	Yes	No	No
Lou Bega	"Mambo No. 5 (A Little Bit Of...)"	No	No	Yes	No	No	No
-M-	"Mama Sam (Live)"	No	No	No	No	Yes	No
M Clan	"Quédate a dormir"	No	No	No	Yes	No	No
Macy Gray	"I Try"	Yes	No	Yes	No	Yes	Yes
Margaret Berger	"Samantha"	No	No	No	No	No	Yes
Maria Mena	"Just Hold Me"	No	No	No	No	No	Yes
Marit Larsen	"Don't Save Me"	No	No	No	No	No	Yes
Miguel Bosé con Rafa Sánchez	"Manos vacías"	No	No	No	Yes	No	No
Mikel Erentxun	"Mañana"	No	No	No	Yes	No	No
Mira Craig	"Boogeyman"	No	No	No	No	No	Yes
Musical Youth	"Pass The Dutchie"	Yes	No	Yes	No	No	No
Najoua Belyzel	"Gabriel"	No	No	No	No	Yes	No
Nelly Furtado	"Powerless (Say What You Want)"	No	No	Yes	No	No	No
New Found Glory	"My Friends Over You"	No	Yes	No	No	No	No
Ne-Yo	"So Sick"	Yes	Yes	No	No	No	No
Olivia Ruiz	"La Femme Chocolat"	No	No	No	No	Yes	No
Orson	"No Tomorrow"	Yes	No	No	No	No	No
OutKast	"Hey Ya!"	Yes	Yes	Yes	Yes	Yes	Yes
Oxmo Puccino	"Avoir Des Potes"	No	No	No	No	Yes	No
Paperboys	"Keep It Cool"	No	No	No	No	No	Yes
Pastora	"Lola"	No	No	No	Yes	No	No
Pereza	"Si quieres bailamos"	No	No	No	Yes	No	No
Phoenix	"If I Ever Feel Better"	No	No	No	No	Yes	No
Pixies	"Here Comes Your Man"	No	Yes	No	No	No	No
Primal Scream	"Movin' On Up"	Yes	No	No	No	No	No
The Pussycat Dolls	"Beep"	Yes	Yes	Yes	No	Yes	Yes
R.E.M.	"Losing My Religion"	Yes	Yes	Yes	Yes	Yes	Yes
Radiohead	"No Surprises"	Yes	Yes	No	Yes	Yes	Yes
Ramones	"I Wanna Be Sedated"	No	Yes	No	No	No	No
Ravi	"Ås to i Osjlo"	No	No	No	No	No	Yes
Ravi & DJ Lov	"E-ore"	No	No	No	No	No	Yes
Razorlight	"America"	Yes	No	No	No	Yes	Yes
Reamonn	"Tonight"	No	No	Yes	No	No	No
Robbie Williams & Nicole Kidman	"Something Stupid"	Yes	No	Yes	Yes	Yes	Yes
The Rolling Stones	"Sympathy For The Devil"	No	Yes	No	No	No	No
Ronan Keating	"Lovin' Each Day"	No	No	Yes	No	No	No
Rosana	"El talismán"	No	No	No	Yes	No	No
Rosario	"Qué bonito"	No	No	No	Yes	No	No
Rose	"La Liste"	No	No	No	No	Yes	No
Rosenstolz	"Auch Im Regen"	No	No	Yes	No	No	No
Sarah Connor	"Bounce"	No	No	Yes	No	No	No
Scissor Sisters	"I Don't Feel Like Dancin'"	Yes	Yes	Yes	Yes	No	No
Sinclair	"A Chaque Seconde"	No	No	No	No	Yes	No
The Smashing Pumpkins	"Today"	No	Yes	No	No	No	No
The Stone Roses	"She Bangs The Drums"	Yes	No	No	No	No	No
Superbus	"Butterfly"	No	No	No	No	Yes	No
Supergrass	"Alright"	Yes	No	Yes	Yes	No	Yes
Texas Lightning	"No No Never"	No	No	Yes	No	No	No
Tokio Hotel	"Der Letzte Tag"	No	No	Yes	No	No	No
Twisted Sister	"We're Not Gonna Take It"	Yes	No	Yes	No	No	Yes
U2	"Beautiful Day"	Yes	Yes	Yes	No	Yes	Yes
US5	"Maria"	No	No	Yes	No	No	No
Warrant	"Cherry Pie"	No	Yes	No	No	No	No
Weezer	"Buddy Holly"	Yes	Yes	Yes	Yes	No	No
Wolfmother	"Love Train"	Yes	Yes	No	No	Yes	Yes
The Zutons	"Valerie"	Yes	No	No	No	No	No
Artist	Song title	UK	US	DE	ES	FR	NO

=== SingStar ABBA ===
Artist	Song title	UK	US	DE
ABBA	"Chiquitita"	Yes	Yes	Yes
ABBA	"Dancing Queen"	Yes	Yes	Yes
ABBA	"Does Your Mother Know"	Yes	Yes	Yes
ABBA	"Fernando"	Yes	Yes	Yes
ABBA	"Gimme! Gimme! Gimme! (A Man After Midnight)"	Yes	Yes	Yes
ABBA	"Happy New Year"	Yes	Yes	Yes
ABBA	"Head Over Heels"	Yes	Yes	Yes
ABBA	"I Do, I Do, I Do, I Do, I Do"	Yes	Yes	Yes
ABBA	"Knowing Me, Knowing You"	Yes	Yes	Yes
ABBA	"Mamma Mia"	Yes	Yes	Yes
ABBA	"Money, Money, Money"	Yes	Yes	Yes
ABBA	"The Name Of The Game"	Yes	Yes	Yes
ABBA	"One Of Us"	Yes	Yes	Yes
ABBA	"Ring Ring"	Yes	Yes	Yes
ABBA	"SOS"	Yes	Yes	Yes
ABBA	"Summer Night City"	Yes	Yes	Yes
ABBA	"Super Trouper"	Yes	Yes	Yes
ABBA	"Take A Chance On Me"	Yes	Yes	Yes
ABBA	"Thank You For The Music"	Yes	Yes	Yes
ABBA	"The Day Before You Came"	Yes	Yes	Yes
ABBA	"Under Attack"	Yes	Yes	Yes
ABBA	"Voulez-Vous"	Yes	Yes	Yes
ABBA	"Waterloo"	Yes	Yes	Yes
ABBA	"When All Is Said And Done"	Yes	Yes	Yes
ABBA	"The Winner Takes It All"	Yes	Yes	Yes
Artist	Song title	UK	US	DE

=== SingStar Chartbreaker ===
Artist	Song title	DE
Adamski	"Killer"	Yes
Ann Lee	"2 Times"	Yes
Ashford & Simpson	"Solid"	Yes
Baltimora	"Tarzan Boy"	Yes
Black	"Wonderful Life"	Yes
Charles & Eddie	"Would I Lie to You?"	Yes
Daryl Braithwaite	"One Summer"	Yes
David Dundas	"Jeans On"	Yes
Eighth Wonder	"I'm Not Scared"	Yes
Emilia	"Big Big World"	Yes
Harpo	"Moviestar"	Yes
Joshua Kadison	"Jessie"	Yes
Lisa Stansfield	"All Around the World"	Yes
Marc Almond & Gene Pitney	"Something's Gotten Hold Of My Heart"	Yes
Marshall Hain	"Dancing In The City"	Yes
Max Werner	"Rain In May"	Yes
Maxi Priest	"Close To You"	Yes
OMC	"How Bizarre"	Yes
Orange Blue	"She's Got That Light (Orange Mix)"	Yes
P. M. Sampson	"We Love To Love"	Yes
Samantha Fox	"Touch Me (I Want Your Body)"	Yes
Sniff 'n' the Tears	"Driver's Seat"	Yes
Talk Talk	"Such A Shame"	Yes
Tasmin Archer	"Sleeping Satellite"	Yes
Thomas Godoj	"Love Is You"	Yes
Thompson Twins	"Doctor! Doctor!"	Yes
Watershed	"Indigo Girl"	Yes
Whigfield	"Saturday Night"	Yes
Artist	Song title	DE

=== SingStar Chart Hits ===
This is an Australian and New Zealand only game.

Artist	Song title	AU
3OH!3	"Don't Trust Me"	Yes
A. R. Rahman feat. The Pussycat Dolls	"Jai Ho"	Yes
Alex Lloyd	"Amazing"	Yes
Ben Lee	"Catch My Disease"	Yes
Colbie Caillat	"Fallin' for You"	Yes
Empire of the Sun	"Walking on a Dream"	Yes
George Michael	"Outside"	Yes
Guy Sebastian feat. Jordin Sparks	"Art of Love"	Yes
Kate Miller-Heidke	"The Last Day on Earth"	Yes
La Roux	"Bulletproof"	Yes
Lady Gaga	"Poker Face"	Yes
Lady Gaga	"Bad Romance"	Yes
The Last Goodnight	"Pictures of You"	Yes
The Living End	"White Noise"	Yes
Michael Bublé	"Haven't Met You Yet"	Yes
Mika	"We Are Golden"	Yes
Milli Vanilli	"Blame It on the Rain"	Yes
Natalie Bassingthwaighte	"Alive"	Yes
Natalie Bassingthwaighte	"Someday Soon"	Yes
Nelly Furtado	"Turn Off the Light"	Yes
OneRepublic	"All the Right Moves"	Yes
Pixie Lott	"Boys and Girls"	Yes
The Presets	"This Boy's in Love"	Yes
The Pussycat Dolls	"Hush Hush; Hush Hush"	Yes
The Pussycat Dolls	"When I Grow Up"	Yes
Vanessa Amorosi	"This Is Who I Am"	Yes
Vitamin C	"Graduation (Friends Forever)"	Yes
Wes Carr	"Feels Like Woah"	Yes
Wes Carr	"You"	Yes
Wolfmother	"New Moon Rising"	Yes
Artist	Song title	AU

=== SingStar Dance ===
Song	Artist	US/UK	ES
"Bye Bye Bye"	NSYNC	Yes	No
"4""	Amaia Montero	No	Yes
"Marta, Sebas, Guille y los demás"	Amaral	No	Yes
"Shut Up"	The Black Eyed Peas	Yes	Yes
"Heart of Glass"	Blondie	Yes	No
"Abrázame muy fuerte"	Bustamante	No	Yes
"Torero"	Chayanne	No	Yes
"With You"	Chris Brown	Yes	No
"Nunca tendré"	Coti	No	Yes
"Girls Just Wanna Have Fun"	Cyndi Lauper	Yes	No
"Esclavo de sus besos"	David Bisbal	No	Yes
"Baby Love"	Diana Ross and The Supremes	Yes	No
"Let Me Out"	Dover	No	Yes
"Por Querete"	Efecto Mariposa	No	Yes
"Eres Tonto"	El Canto Del Loco	No	Yes
"I Will Survive"	Gloria Gaynor	Yes	Yes
"Standing in the Way of Control"	Gossip	Yes	No
"What You Waiting For?"	Gwen Stefani	Yes	Yes
"Cosmic Girl"	Jamiroquai	Yes	No
"Lento"	Julia Venegas	No	Yes
"That's the Way (I Like It)"	KC & The Sunshine Band	Yes	No
"Day 'n' Nite"	Kid Cudi vs Crookers	Yes	No
"Celebration"	Kool and the Gang	Yes	No
"Poker Face"	Lady Gaga	Yes	Yes
"Bulletproof"	La Roux	Yes	No
"Tengo"	Macaco	No	Yes
"Cosos Que Suenen A..."	Maldita Nerea	No	Yes
"Toda"	Malú	No	Yes
"U Can't Touch This"	MC Hammer	Yes	No
"Como una vela"	Melendi	No	Yes
"Don Diablo"	Miguel Bosé	No	Yes
"Pantera en Libertad"	Mónica Naranjo	No	Yes
"Ay! Amor"	Nena Daconte	No	Yes
"Hangin' Tough"	New Kids on the Block	Yes	No
"Pop"	La Oreja de Van Gogh	No	Yes
"Hey Ya!"	Outkast	Yes	No
"Lola"	Pastora	No	Yes
"Straight Up"	Paula Abdul	Yes	No
"Causa y Efecto"	Paulina Rubio	No	Yes
"Todo me da Igual"	Pignoise	No	Yes
"I Know You Want Me (Calle Ocho)"	Pitbull	Yes	Yes
"I Like To Move It"	Reel 2 Real feat. The Mad Stuntman	Yes	Yes
"Livin' La Vida Loca"	Ricky Martin	Yes	Yes
"It's Like That"	Run DMC vs. Jason Nevins	Yes	No
"Push It"	Salt N Pepa	Yes	No
"Boombastic"	Shaggy	Yes	No
"Baby Got Back"	Sir Mix A Lot	Yes	No
"Crank That"	Soulja Boy Tell 'Em	Yes	No
"Everybody (Backstreet's Back)"	Backstreet Boys	Yes	Yes
"I Want You Back"	The Jackson 5	Yes	No
"Don't Cha"	The Pussycat Dolls	Yes	No
"Sólo quiero bailar"	Zenttric	No	Yes

=== SingStar Guitar ===
Artist	Song	UK	DE	AU
3 Doors Down	"Kryptonite"	Yes	Yes	Yes
Auletta	"Meine Stadt"	No	Yes	No
Bloc Party	"Helicopter"	Yes	Yes	Yes
Blur	"Song 2"	Yes	Yes	Yes
Buzzcocks	"Ever Fallen in Love"	Yes	No	Yes
Choirboys	"Run to Paradise"	No	No	Yes
Colbie Caillat	"Bubbly"	Yes	Yes	Yes
David Bowie	"The Man Who Sold the World"	Yes	Yes	Yes
Die Toten Hosen	"Ertrinken"	No	Yes	No
Elbow	"Grounds for Divorce"	Yes	Yes	No
Eskimo Joe	"From the Sea"	No	No	Yes
Florence and the Machine	"Kiss with a Fist"	Yes	Yes	Yes
Franz Ferdinand	"No You Girls"	Yes	Yes	Yes
Ich + Ich	"Pflaster"	No	Yes	No
Jamiroquai	"Too Young to Die"	Yes	Yes	No
Jennifer Rostock	"Kopf oder Zahl"	No	Yes	No
Kaiser Chiefs	"I Predict a Riot"	Yes	Yes	Yes
Kasabian	"Fire"	Yes	Yes	Yes
Keith Urban	"Days Go By"	No	No	Yes
KT Tunstall	"Suddenly I See"	Yes	Yes	No
Ladyhawke	"My Delirium"	Yes	No	Yes
Madsen	"Lass die Liebe regieren"	No	Yes	No
Muse	"Supermassive Black Hole"	Yes	Yes	Yes
Paramore	"crushcrushcrush"	Yes	No	Yes
Pixies	"Debaser"	Yes	No	Yes
Pulp	"Disco 2000"	Yes	Yes	Yes
Queen & David Bowie	"Under Pressure"	Yes	Yes	Yes
Revolverheld	"Spinner"	No	Yes	No
Stereophonics	"Just Looking"	Yes	Yes	Yes
The Angels	"Take a Long Line"	No	No	Yes
The Stone Roses	"Waterfall"	Yes	No	Yes
The BossHoss	"Go! Go! Go!"	No	Yes	No
The Clash	"Rock the Casbah"	Yes	Yes	Yes
The Cult	"She Sells Sanctuary"	Yes	Yes	Yes
The Cure	"The Lovecats"	Yes	Yes	No
The Living End	"Prisoner of Society"	No	No	Yes
The Raconteurs	"Steady, As She Goes"	Yes	Yes	Yes
The Veronicas	"Untouched"	Yes	No	Yes
The White Stripes	"Fell In Love With A Girl"	Yes	Yes	Yes
The Wrights	"Evie Part 1 (Let Your Hair Hang Down)"	No	No	Yes
Tina Turner	"Steamy Windows"	Yes	Yes	No
Tokio Hotel	"Automatisch"	No	Yes	No
U2	"Beautiful Day"	Yes	Yes	Yes
Vampire Weekend	"A-Punk"	Yes	No	No
Artist	Song	UK	DE	AU

=== SingStar Hits ===
Artist	Song title	FR
Aaron	"U Turn (Lili)"	Yes
Alain Souchon	"Foule Sentimentale"	Yes
Anggun	"Juste Avant Toi"	Yes
Aston Villa	"Un Million De Lézards"	Yes
Camille	"Ta Douleur"	Yes
Christophe Maé	"C'est Ma Terre"	Yes
Christophe Maé	"On S'attache"	Yes
Corynne Charby	"Pile Ou Face"	Yes
Didier Barbelivien et Félix Gray	"A Toutes Les Filles"	Yes
Dorothée	"Allo Allo Mr l'Ordinateur"	Yes
Etienne Daho	"L'Invitation"	Yes
Frédéric Lerner	"Plus Là"	Yes
Gilles Gabriel	"Flou De Toi"	Yes
Jean Pierre Francois	"Je Te Survivrai"	Yes
Julien Clerc	"Femmes Je Vous Aime"	Yes
Justice	"D.A.N.C.E."	Yes
Lââm	"Jamais Loin De Toi"	Yes
Loane	"Jamais Seule"	Yes
Louisy Joseph	"Assis Par Terre"	Yes
Lynnsha	"Je Veux Que Tu Me Mentes"	Yes
Mademoiselle K	"Grave"	Yes
Magic System	"Zouglou Dance"	Yes
NZH	"Princess"	Yes
Pauline	"Allo Le Monde"	Yes
Raphaël	"Le Vent De l'Hiver"	Yes
Renaud et Axelle Red	"Manhattan-Kaboul"	Yes
Rose	"Ciao Bella"	Yes
Soprano – Blacko	"Ferme les yeux et imagine toi"	Yes
Yael Naim	"New Soul"	Yes
Zaho	"C'est Chelou"	Yes
Artist	Song title	FR

=== SingStar Made In Germany ===
Artist	Song title	DE
2raumwohnung	"Wir Werden Sehen"	Yes
Bananafishbones & Franka Potente	"Easy Day"	Yes
BEN*JAMMIN	"Spring"	Yes
Boney M.	"Ma Baker"	Yes
Cassandra Steen	"Darum Leben Wir"	Yes
Culcha Candela	"Ey DJ"	Yes
Die Doofen	"Mief! (Nimm Mich Jetzt, Auch Wenn Ich Stinke)"	Yes
Eisblume	"Eisblumen"	Yes
Extrabreit	"Flieger, Grüß Mir Die Sonne"	Yes
Die Fantastischen Vier	""Die Da!?!"	Yes
Fury In The Slaughter House	"When I'm Dead And Gone"	Yes
Guano Apes	"You Can't Stop Me"	Yes
H-Blockx	"Countdown To Insanity"	Yes
Karat	"Über Sieben Brücken Musst Du Gehn"	Yes
Killerpilze	"Liebmichhassmich"	Yes
Lucilectric	"Mädchen"	Yes
Max Herre mit Joy Denalane	"1ste Liebe"	Yes
Melanie Thornton	"Love How You Love Me"	Yes
Milli Vanilli	"Girl You Know It's True"	Yes
Nena, Olli & Remmler	"Ich Kann Nix Dafür"	Yes
Die Prinzen	"Millionär"	Yes
PUR	"Lena"	Yes
Rosenstolz	"Wie Weit Ist Vorbei"	Yes
Sandra	"Maria Magdalena"	Yes
Sarah Connor	"From Sarah With Love"	Yes
Scorpions	"Send Me An Angel"	Yes
Selig	"Schau Schau"	Yes
Tomte	"Ich Sang Die Ganze Zeit Von Dir"	Yes
Die Toten Hosen	"Alles Was War"	Yes
Wolfgang Petry	"Bronze, Silber Und Gold (Live)"	Yes
Artist	Song title	DE

=== SingStar Mallorca Party ===
Artist	Song title	DE
Almklausi	"Ich Vermiss Dich (Wie Die Hölle) – Mallorca-Version"	Yes
Almklausi	"LoLoLos Geht's"	Yes
Anna-Maria Zimmermann	"Wer Ist Dieser DJ"	Yes
Arsenium	"Rumadai"	Yes
Axel Fischer	"Amsterdam"	Yes
Chris Marlow	"Santa Maria"	Yes
Creme 21	"Wann Wird's Mal Wieder Richtig Sommer"	Yes
Dieter De	"Erna Kommt"	Yes
DJ Abschleppdienst	"Party, Palmen, Weiber Und'n Bier (Beach Mix)"	Yes
DJ Ötzi	"Hey Baby"	Yes
DJ Ötzi	"Noch In 100.000 Jahren"	Yes
DJ Ötzi und Hermes House Band	"Live Is Life"	Yes
Hermes House Band	"Those Were The Days"	Yes
Jürgen	"Immer Wenn Ich Traurig Bin"	Yes
Jürgen Drews	"König Von Mallorca"	Yes
Krümel	"Mädchen Mädchen"	Yes
Marco Bandero	"Herzfest"	Yes
Michael Wendler	"Nina"	Yes
Michael Wendler	"Sie Liebt Den DJ"	Yes
Mickie Krause	"Orange Trägt Nur Die Müllabfuhr"	Yes
Nic	"Ich Will Dich Für Immer"	Yes
Peter Wackel	"Joana"	Yes
Peter Wackel	"Manchmal Möchte Ich Schon Mit Dir"	Yes
Right Said Fred	"Stand Up (For The Champions)"	Yes
Schäfer Heinrich	"Das Schäferlied"	Yes
Stefan Peters	"Schwarze Natascha"	Yes
Strandgeier	"Hände Hoch"	Yes
Tim Toupet	"Ich bin Ein Döner"	Yes
Tim Toupet	"So A Schöner Tag (Der Flieger)"	Yes
Zascha Moktan	"Seit Mehr Als 1000 Jahren (Herz, Schmerz Und Dies Und Das)"	Yes
Artist	Song title	DE

=== SingStar Mecano ===
Artist	Song title	ES
Mecano	"El 7 de septiembre"	Yes
Mecano	"Aire"	Yes
Mecano	"Ay qué pesado"	Yes
Mecano	"Bailando salsa"	Yes
Mecano	"Barco a Venus"	Yes
Mecano	"El blues del esclavo"	Yes
Mecano	"Cruz de navajas"	Yes
Mecano	"Eungenio Salvador Dalí"	Yes
Mecano	"El fallo positivo"	Yes
Mecano	"La fuerza del destino"	Yes
Mecano	"Hawaii-Bombay"	Yes
Mecano	"Héroes de la Antártida"	Yes
Mecano	"Hijo de la luna"	Yes
Mecano	"Hoy no me puedo levantar"	Yes
Mecano	"J.C."	Yes
Mecano	"Japón"	Yes
Mecano	"Laika"	Yes
Mecano	"Los amantes"	Yes
Mecano	"Maquillaje"	Yes
Mecano	"Me colé en una fiesta"	Yes
Mecano	"Me cuesta tanto olvidarte"	Yes
Mecano	"Mujer contra mujer"	Yes
Mecano	"Naturaleza muerta"	Yes
Mecano	"No es serio este cementerio"	Yes
Mecano	"No hay marcha en Nueva York"	Yes
Mecano	"Perdido en mi habitación"	Yes
Mecano	"Quédate en Madrid"	Yes
Mecano	"Un año más"	Yes
Mecano	"Una rosa es una rosa"	Yes
Mecano	"Ya viene el sol"	Yes
Artist	Song title	ES

=== SingStar Morangos com Açucar ===
Artist	Song title	PT
4TASTE	"Diz-me Que Sim"	Yes
4TASTE	"Sempre Que Te Vejo (Sinto Um Desejo) (Ao Vivo)"	Yes
4TASTE	"Só Tu Podes Alcançar (Ao Vivo)"	Yes
André Indiana	"Electric Mind"	Yes
Angélico	"Bailarina"	Yes
Boss AC	"Princesa (Beija-me Outra Vez)"	Yes
Dama Bete	"Definição de Amor"	Yes
Diana Lucas	"Desculpa Lá"	Yes
Dogma	"O Segredo"	Yes
D'ZRT	"Para Mim Tanto Faz (Ao Vivo)"	Yes
D'ZRT	"Querer Voltar"	Yes
D'ZRT	"Verão Azul"	Yes
Fingertips	"Cause To Love You"	Yes
Hands On Approach	"If You Give Up"	Yes
Just Girls	"Bye, Bye (Vou-me Divertir)"	Yes
Just Girls	"Entre O Sonho E A Ilusão"	Yes
Just Girls	"Não Te Deixes Vencer"	Yes
Just Girls vs Gutto	"O Jogo Já Começou"	Yes
Loto	"Cuckoo Plan"	Yes
Lulla Bye	"A Bigger Plan"	Yes
Maroon 5	"Won't Go Home Without You"	Yes
Mercado Negro	"Leoa Tigresa"	Yes
Miss Li	"Gotta Leave My Troubles Behind"	Yes
NBC	"Segunda Pele"	Yes
Os Azeitonas	"Um Tanto Ou Quanto Atarantado"	Yes
Patrícia Candoso	"Volta As Vezes Que Quiseres"	Yes
Slimmy	"You Should Never Leave Me (Before I Die)"	Yes
Squeeze Theeze Pleeze	"Hi, Hello (My Name Is Joe)"	Yes
Sugarleaf	"Everything Is So Confusing"	Yes
TT	"Faz Acontecer"	Yes
Artist	Song title	PT

=== SingStar Motown ===
Artist	Song title	UK
The Commodores	"Brick House"	Yes
The Commodores	"Easy"	Yes
The Contours	"Do You Love Me"	Yes
David Ruffin	"Put A Little Love In Your Heart"	Yes
Diana Ross & The Supremes	"Reflections"	Yes
The Four Tops	"I Can't Help Myself"	Yes
The Four Tops	"Reach Out I'll Be There"	Yes
The Isley Brothers	"This Old Heart Of Mine (Is Weak For You)"	Yes
The Jackson 5	"ABC"	Yes
The Jackson 5	"I Want You Back"	Yes
Jimmy Ruffin	"What Becomes Of The Broken Hearted"	Yes
Lionel Richie	"My Destiny"	Yes
Martha Reeves & The Vandellas	"Dancing In The Street"	Yes
Martha Reeves & The Vandellas	"Jimmy Mack"	Yes
Martha Reeves & The Vandellas	"Nowhere To Run"	Yes
Marvin Gaye	"I Heard It Through The Grapevine"	Yes
Marvin Gaye	"Let's Get It On"	Yes
Marvin Gaye	"What's Going On?"	Yes
Marvin Gaye & Kim Weston	"It Takes Two"	Yes
Mary Wells	"My Guy"	Yes
The Miracles	"Love Machine"	Yes
Rick James	"Super Freak"	Yes
Smokey Robinson	"Being With You"	Yes
Smokey Robinson And The Miracles	"The Tracks Of My Tears"	Yes
Stevie Wonder	"For Once in My Life"	Yes
The Supremes	"Stop In The Name Of Love"	Yes
The Supremes	"You Can't Hurry Love"	Yes
The Temptations	"Get Ready"	Yes
The Temptations	"Papa Was A Rollin' Stone"	Yes
The Velvelettes	"Needle In A Haystack"	Yes
Artist	Song title	UK

=== SingStar Polskie Hity ===
Artist	Song title	PL
Ania Dąbrowska	"Nigdy Więcej Nie Tańcz Ze Mną"	Yes
Ania Dąbrowska	"W Spodniach Czy W Sukience"	Yes
Anna Wyszkoni i Video	"Soft"	Yes
Blog 27	"Wid Out Ya"	Yes
De Mono	"Kamień i Aksamit"	Yes
Ewelina Flinta	"Żałuję"	Yes
Feel	"A Gdy Jest Już Ciemno"	Yes
Feel	"No Pokaż Na Co Cię Stać"	Yes
Formacja Nieżywych Schabuff	"Ławka"	Yes
Gadowski & Kościkiewicz	"Szczęśliwego Nowego Jorku"	Yes
Kombii	"Ślad"	Yes
Lady Pank	"Stacja Warszawa"	Yes
Łukasz Zagrobelny	"Nieprawda"	Yes
Łukasz Zagrobelny & Ewelina Flinta	"Nie Kłam, Że Kochasz Mnie"	Yes
Mandaryna	"Ev'ry Night"	Yes
Marcin Rozynek	"Siłacz"	Yes
Mezo & Kasia Wilk	"Ważne"	Yes
Papa D	"Bezimienni"	Yes
Patrycja Markowska	"Jeszcze Raz"	Yes
Patrycja Markowska	"Świat Się Pomylił"	Yes
Stachursky	"Jedwab"	Yes
Stachursky	"Za Każdy Dzień, Za Każdy Szept"	Yes
Strachy na Lachy	"Dzień Dobry, Kocham Cię"	Yes
Sylwia Grzeszczak & Liber	"Co Z Nami Będzie"	Yes
Sylwia Grzeszczak & Liber	"Nowe Szanse"	Yes
Szymon Wydra & Carpe Diem	"Całe Życie Grasz"	Yes
Szymon Wydra & Carpe Diem	"Życie Jak Poemat"	Yes
Verba	"Pokaż Mi"	Yes
Verba	"Widziałem Twoje Oczy"	Yes
Video	"Bella"	Yes
Artist	Song title	PL

=== SingStar Pop Edition ===
Artist	Song title	UK	DE
Alphabeat	"10,000 Nights"	Yes	No
Amy Winehouse	"Rehab"	Yes	Yes
Annett Louisan	"Drück Die 1"	No	Yes
BAP	"Verdamp Lang Her"	No	Yes
Black Kids	"I'm Not Gonna Teach Your Boyfriend How To Dance With You"	Yes	No
Bon Jovi	"Livin' On A Prayer"	Yes	Yes
Chris Brown	"With You"	Yes	Yes
Chris De Burgh	"Lady In Red"	Yes	Yes
Cyndi Lauper	"True Colors"	Yes	Yes
Die Toten Hosen	"Strom"	No	Yes
The Feeling	"Rosé"	Yes	No
Gloria Estefan	"Rhythm Is Gonna Get You"	Yes	No
Jordin Sparks feat. Chris Brown	"No Air"	Yes	Yes
Juli	"Dieses Leben"	No	Yes
Kaiser Chiefs	"Never Miss A Beat"	Yes	No
Kate Nash	"Mouthwash"	Yes	No
The Killers	"Human"	Yes	Yes
Kings Of Leon	"Sex On Fire"	Yes	No
Klaxons	"Gravity's Rainbow"	Yes	No
LaFee	"Ring Frei"	No	Yes
Little Jackie	"The World Should Revolve Around Me"	Yes	Yes
Madness	"It Must Be Love"	Yes	No
MIA.	"Mein Freund"	No	Yes
Nelly feat. Fergie	"Party People"	Yes	Yes
P!nk	"So What"	Yes	Yes
The Police	"Every Little Thing She Does Is Magic"	Yes	Yes
Queen	"Bohemian Rhapsody"	Yes	Yes
Rainbirds	"Blueprint"	No	Yes
Rapsoul	"König Der Welt"	No	Yes
Robbie Williams	"Angels"	Yes	Yes
Robyn	"Be Mine"	Yes	No
Rockwell	"Somebody's Watching Me"	Yes	Yes
Sam Sparro	"Black And Gold"	Yes	No
Sarah Connor	"Under my Skin"	No	Yes
The Script	"The Man Who Can't Be Moved"	Yes	Yes
Solange	"I Decided"	Yes	Yes
Sugababes	"Girls"	Yes	Yes
Thomas Godoj	"Helden Gesucht"	No	Yes
Tokio Hotel	"Übers Ende Der Welt"	No	Yes
Udo Lindenberg	"Horizont"	No	Yes
Will Young	"Changes"	Yes	No
The Verve	"Bittersweet Symphony"	Yes	No
Yazoo	"Don't Go"	Yes	Yes
Artist	Song title	UK	DE

=== SingStar Queen ===
Artist	Song title	UK	US
Queen	"Another One Bites The Dust"	Yes	Yes
Queen	"Bicycle Race"	Yes	No
Queen	"Bohemian Rhapsody"	Yes	Yes
Queen	"Breakthru"	Yes	Yes
Queen	"Crazy Little Thing Called Love"	Yes	Yes
Queen	"Don't Stop Me Now"	Yes	Yes
Queen	"Fat Bottomed Girls"	Yes	Yes
Queen	"Hammer To Fall"	Yes	Yes
Queen	"I Want It All"	Yes	Yes
Queen	"I Want To Break Free"	Yes	Yes
Queen	"Innuendo"	Yes	Yes
Queen	"Killer Queen"	Yes	Yes
Queen	"A Kind Of Magic"	Yes	Yes
Queen	"One Vision"	Yes	Yes
Queen	"Play The Game"	Yes	Yes
Queen	"Radio Ga Ga"	Yes	Yes
Queen	"Save Me"	No	Yes
Queen	"The Show Must Go On"	Yes	Yes
Queen	"Somebody To Love"	Yes	Yes
Queen	"These Are The Days Of Our Lives"	Yes	Yes
Queen	"Tie Your Mother Down"	Yes	Yes
Queen and David Bowie	"Under Pressure"	Yes	Yes
Queen	"We Are The Champions"	Yes	Yes
Queen	"We Will Rock You"	Yes	Yes
Queen	"Who Wants To Live Forever"	Yes	Yes
Queen	"You're My Best Friend"	Yes	Yes
Artist	Song title	UK	US

=== SingStar Take That ===
Artist	Song title	UK
Take That	"Babe"	Yes
Take That	"Back For Good"	Yes
Take That	"Beautiful World"	Yes
Take That	"Could It Be Magic"	Yes
Take That	"Do What U Like"	Yes
Take That	"Everything Changes"	Yes
Take That	"Gr8est Day"	Yes
Take That	"Hold Up A Light"	Yes
Take That	"I'd W8 For Life"	Yes
Take That	"It Only Takes A Minute"	Yes
Take That	"Love Ain't Here Anymore"	Yes
Take That	"A Million Love Songs"	Yes
Take That	"Never Forget"	Yes
Take That	"Once You've Tasted Love"	Yes
Take That	"Patience"	Yes
Take That	"Pray"	Yes
Take That	"Promises"	Yes
Take That	"Reach Out"	Yes
Take That	"Rule The World"	Yes
Take That	"Said It All"	Yes
Take That	"Shine"	Yes
Take That	"Sure"	Yes
Take That	"Up All Night"	Yes
Take That	"Why Can't I Wake Up With You"	Yes
Take That Featuring Lulu	"Relight My Fire"	Yes
Artist	Song title	UK

=== SingStar Vasco ===
Artist	Song title	IT
Vasco Rossi	"Basta Poco"	Yes
Vasco Rossi	""Blasco" Rossi"	Yes
Vasco Rossi	"Buoni O Cattivi"	Yes
Vasco Rossi	"Colpa Del Whisky"	Yes
Vasco Rossi	"Come Stai"	Yes
Vasco Rossi	"E Adesso Che Tocca A Me"	Yes
Vasco Rossi	"E..."	Yes
Vasco Rossi	"Gioca Con Me"	Yes
Vasco Rossi	"Hai Mai"	Yes
Vasco Rossi	"Io No"	Yes
Vasco Rossi	"Liberi Liberi"	Yes
Vasco Rossi	"Mi Si Escludeva"	Yes
Vasco Rossi	"Il Mondo Che Vorrei"	Yes
Vasco Rossi	"Quanti Anni Hai"	Yes
Vasco Rossi	"Rewind"	Yes
Vasco Rossi	"Señorita"	Yes
Vasco Rossi	"Senza Parole"	Yes
Vasco Rossi	"Siamo Soli"	Yes
Vasco Rossi	"Gli Spari Sopra (Celebrate)"	Yes
Vasco Rossi	"Stupido Hotel"	Yes
Vasco Rossi	"Ti Prendo E Ti Porto Via"	Yes
Vasco Rossi	"Un Senso"	Yes
Vasco Rossi	"Vieni Qui"	Yes
Vasco Rossi	"Vivere"	Yes
Artist	Song title	IT

=== SingStar Vol. 2 ===
Artist	Song title	UK	US	DE	ES
Aerosmith	"Dude (Looks Like A Lady)"	Yes	Yes	Yes	Yes
Alejandro	El Alma al Aire	No	No	No	Yes
Bad English	"When I See You Smile"	No	Yes	No	No
Blur	"Country House"	Yes	No	Yes	Yes
Bobby Brown	"My Prerogative"	Yes	Yes	Yes	No
Boys Like Girls	"Hero/Heroine"	No	Yes	No	No
Bustamante	Cobarde	No	No	No	Yes
La Cabra Mecánica con María Jiménez	La Lista De La Compra	No	No	No	Yes
Chambao	Papeles Mojados	No	No	No	Yes
Coldplay	"Talk"	No	No	Yes	No
Die Fantastischen Vier	"IchIsIchIsIchIsIch"	No	No	Yes	No
Elton John & Kiki Dee	"Don't Go Breaking My Heart"	No	Yes	No	No
Efecto Mariposa	Si Tú Quisieras	No	No	No	Yes
Ella Baila Sola	Amores De Barra	No	No	No	Yes
Eminem	"Without Me"	Yes	Yes	Yes	Yes
Gavin DeGraw	"In Love with a Girl"	No	Yes	No	No
George Michael	"Freedom! '90"	Yes	No	Yes	Yes
Gnarls Barkley	"Run (I'm a Natural Disaster)"	No	Yes	No	No
Goldfrapp	"Happiness"	No	Yes	No	No
Gorillaz	"DARE"	Yes	No	Yes	No
Gossip	"Standing In The Way Of Control"	Yes	No	No	Yes
Hot Chocolate	"You Sexy Thing"	Yes	No	Yes	Yes
Ich + Ich	"Stark"	No	No	Yes	No
Jarabe de Palo con La Mari De Chambao	Déjame Vivir	No	No	No	Yes
José El Francés con Niña Pastori y Vincente Amigo	Fuera De Mí (Ya No Quiero Tu Querer)	No	No	No	Yes
Julieta Venegas	Eres Para Mí	No	No	No	Yes
Kaiser Chiefs	"Ruby"	Yes	No	Yes	Yes
Kool & the Gang	"Celebration"	Yes	No	Yes	No
Lit	"Miserable"	No	Yes	No	No
The Lovin' Spoonful	"Summer in the City"	Yes	No	Yes	No
Maxïmo Park	"Our Velocity"	Yes	No	Yes	No
Mecano	La fuerza del destino	No	No	No	Yes
Merche	Cal Y Arena	No	No	No	Yes
Miguel Bosé con Bimba Bosé	Como un Lobo	No	No	No	Yes
MIKA	"Relax, Take It Easy"	No	No	Yes	No
Morrissey	"Suedehead"	Yes	No	Yes	No
Natasha Bedingfield	"Unwritten"	No	Yes	No	No
Nirvana	"Lithium"	Yes	No	Yes	Yes
Panic! At The Disco	"But It's Better If You Do"	Yes	No	No	No
Panic! At The Disco	"Nine In The Afternoon"	No	Yes	No	No
Paramore	"Crushcrushcrush"	No	Yes	No	No
Paul McCartney And The Frog Chorus	"We All Stand Together"	Yes	No	No	No
Pereza	Estrella Polar	No	No	No	Yes
Phantom Planet	"California"	No	Yes	No	No
Pignoise	Sigo Llorando Por Ti	No	No	No	Yes
Pink	"Just Like A Pill"	No	Yes	No	No
Pulp	"Common People"	Yes	No	No	Yes
La Quinta Estación	Sueños Rotos	No	No	No	Yes
Radiohead	"Street Spirit"	Yes	Yes	No	No
Rise Against	"Prayer of the Refugee"	No	Yes	No	No
Rooney	"I Should've Been After You"	No	No	Yes	No
Sara Bareilles	"Love Song"	No	Yes	No	No
Sasha	"Lucky Day"	No	No	Yes	No
Shakespears Sister	"Stay"	Yes	No	Yes	No
Snow Patrol	"Shut Your Eyes"	No	No	Yes	No
Spandau Ballet	"True"	Yes	No	Yes	No
Sting	"Englishman In New York"	No	No	Yes	No
The Bravery	"Believe"	No	Yes	No	No
The Cure	"Pictures of You"	Yes	Yes	No	Yes
The Killers	"When You Were Young"	Yes	Yes	Yes	Yes
The Libertines	"Can't Stand Me Now"	Yes	No	No	No
The Mamas & The Papas	"California Dreamin'"	Yes	Yes	Yes	Yes
The Offspring	"Pretty Fly (For A White Guy)"	Yes	Yes	Yes	Yes
The Police	"Don't Stand So Close To Me"	Yes	Yes	No	Yes
The Proclaimers	"I'm Gonna Be (500 Miles)"	Yes	Yes	Yes	No
The Shins	"New Slang"	No	Yes	No	No
Timbaland Feat. OneRepublic	"Apologize"	No	No	Yes	No
Tom Jones feat. Mousse T.	"Sexbomb"	Yes	No	Yes	Yes
Tone Lōc	"Funky Cold Medina"	Yes	Yes	Yes	No
Weezer	"Beverly Hills"	No	Yes	No	No
Yael Naim	"New Soul"	No	Yes	No	No
Young MC	"Bust A Move"	Yes	Yes	No	No
Artist	Song title	UK	US	DE	ES

=== SingStar Vol. 3: Party Edition ===
Artist	Song title	UK	DE	ES
Aerosmith	"Cryin'"	Yes	Yes	No
Amaral	"Kamikaze"	No	No	Yes
Amy MacDonald	"This Is The Life"	Yes	Yes	No
Anastacia	"Sick And Tired"	No	Yes	No
Barry Manilow	"Copacabana"	Yes	Yes	No
Belanova	"Baila Mi Corazón"	No	No	Yes
El Canto Del Loco	"Eres Tonto"	No	No	Yes
Carlos Baute	"Tú No Sabes Que Tanto"	No	No	Yes
Chenoa	"El Bolsillo Del Revés"	No	No	Yes
Coldplay	"Viva La Vida"	Yes	No	No
Communards	"Never Can Say Goodbye"	Yes	Yes	No
Conchita	"Tres Segundos"	No	No	Yes
David Bowie	"Space Oddity"	Yes	Yes	No
Deep Blue Something	"Breakfast At Tiffany's"	Yes	Yes	No
Los Delinqüentes	"La Primavera Trompetera"	No	No	Yes
Despistaos	"Estoy Aquí"	No	No	Yes
Dizzee Rascal feat. Calvin Harris & Chrome	"Dance Wiv Me"	Yes	No	No
Dover	"Serenade 07"	No	No	Yes
Fall Out Boy	"This Aint A Scene, It's An Arms Race"	Yes	No	No
Feargal Sharkey	"A Good Heart"	Yes	Yes	No
Fergie	"Big Girls Don't Cry"	Yes	Yes	No
Fettes Brot	"Emanuela"	No	Yes	No
La Fuga	"Buscando En La Basura"	No	No	Yes
Gwen Stefani feat. Akon	"The Sweet Escape"	Yes	Yes	No
Happy Mondays	"Kinky Afro"	Yes	No	No
Heaven 17	"Temptation"	Yes	Yes	No
Herbert Grönemeyer	"Mensch"	No	Yes	No
Héroes del Silencio	"La Chispa Adecuada"	No	No	Yes
Huecco	"Reina De Los Angelotes"	No	No	Yes
Ich + Ich	"So Soll Es Bleiben"	No	Yes	No
Jaula De Grillos	"Veinte Años"	No	No	Yes
Joaquín Sabina	"Por El Boulevard De Los Sueños Rotos"	No	No	Yes
Julieta Venegas	"Me Voy"	No	No	Yes
K.D. Lang	"Constant Craving"	Yes	No	No
Kate Bush	"Babooshka"	Yes	Yes	No
Leo Sayer	"You Make Me Feel Like Dancing"	Yes	Yes	No
Lionel Richie	"All Night Long"	Yes	Yes	No
Macaco	"Con La Mano Levantá"	No	No	Yes
Marc Cohn	"Walking In Memphis"	No	Yes	No
Malú	"Aprendiz"	No	No	Yes
M-Clan	"Roto Por Dentro"	No	No	Yes
Mecano	"No hay marcha en Nueva York"	No	No	Yes
Melendi	"Desde Mi Ventana"	No	No	Yes
Melocos con Natalia Jiménez	"Cuando Me Vaya"	No	No	Yes
Michael Jackson	"Billie Jean"	Yes	Yes	Yes
MisterCometa	"Me Gustaría"	No	No	Yes
No Way Out	"Lo Mismo"	No	No	Yes
La Oreja de Van Gogh	"Cuídate"	No	No	Yes
Pastora	"Grandes Despedidas"	No	No	Yes
Paul McCartney & Stevie Wonder	"Ebony And Ivory"	Yes	No	No
Pereza	"Todo"	No	No	Yes
Pignoise	"Sin Ti"	No	No	Yes
Queen	"Killer Queen"	Yes	Yes	No
La Quinta Estación	"Me Muero"	No	No	Yes
Sara Bareilles	"Love Song"	Yes	Yes	No
Sin Rumbo	"Morir Con Flequillo"	No	No	Yes
The Smashing Pumpkins	"1979"	Yes	No	No
Stanfour	"For All Lovers"	No	Yes	No
Take That	"Could It Be Magic"	Yes	Yes	No
Texas	"Say What You Want"	Yes	Yes	No
Timbaland feat. Keri Hilson	"The Way I Are"	Yes	Yes	No
Timbaland Feat. OneRepublic	"Apologize"	Yes	No	No
The Ting Tings	"Shut Up And Let Me Go"	Yes	Yes	No
Toploader	"Dancing In The Moonlight"	No	Yes	No
Transvision Vamp	"Baby I Don't Care"	Yes	No	No
Vampire Weekend	"Oxford Comma"	Yes	No	No
Yael Naim	"New Soul"	No	Yes	No
Artist	Song title	UK	DE	ES

=== SingStar The Wiggles ===
Artist	Song title	AU
The Wiggles	"Can You (Point Your Fingers And Do The Twist)"	Yes
The Wiggles	"Dorothy (Would You Like To Dance With Me?)"	Yes
The Wiggles	"Dr Knickerbocker"	Yes
The Wiggles	"Fruit Salad"	Yes
The Wiggles	"Get Ready to Wiggle"	Yes
The Wiggles	"Getting Strong!"	Yes
The Wiggles	"Go Santa Go"	Yes
The Wiggles	"Here Come The Chicken"	Yes
The Wiggles feat. Jamie Redfern	"Hot Poppin' Popcorn"	Yes
The Wiggles	"Hot Potato"	Yes
The Wiggles	"I'm Dorothy the Dinosaur!"	Yes
The Wiggles	"Lights, Camera, Action, Wiggles!"	Yes
The Wiggles	"Move Your Arms Like Henry"	Yes
The Wiggles	"Ooh It's Captain Feathersword"	Yes
The Wiggles	"Play Your Guitar With Murray"	Yes
The Wiggles	"Captain Feathersword Fell Asleep on His Pirate Ship (Quack Quack)"	Yes
The Wiggles	"Rock-A-Bye Your Bear"	Yes
The Wiggles	"The Monkey Dance"	Yes
The Wiggles	"The Shimmie Shake!"	Yes
The Wiggles	"To Have A Tea Party"	Yes
The Wiggles	"Toot Toot, Chugga Chugga, Big Red Car"	Yes
The Wiggles	"Twinkle, Twinkle, Little Star"	Yes
The Wiggles	"Wags the Dog Is Chasing His Tail"	Yes
The Wiggles	"Wake Up Jeff!"	Yes
The Wiggles	"Wiggle Bay"	Yes
Artist	Song title	AU

=== SingStar Ultimate Party ===
Note: This game was also released for the PlayStation 4.

Artist	Song title	UK	DE	PL	PT
5 Seconds of Summer	"She Looks So Perfect"	Yes	No	No	No
Amor Electro	"Rosa Sangue"	No	No	No	No
Aurea	"Busy (For Me)"	No	No	No	Yes
Agnieszka Chylińska	"Nie Mogę Cię Zapomnieć"	No	No	Yes	No
Avicii feat. Dan Tyminski	"Hey Brother"	Yes	Yes	Yes	Yes
Bednarek	"Cisza"	No	No	Yes	No
Bridgit Mendler	"Ready Or Not"	Yes	No	No	No
Boss AC	"Sexta-Feira (Emprego Bom Já)"	No	No	No	Yes
Carly Rae Jepsen	"Call Me Maybe"	Yes	Yes	Yes	Yes
Clean Bandit feat. Jess Glynne	"Rather Be"	Yes	Yes	Yes	No
Coldplay	"Magic"	Yes	Yes	Yes	Yes
David Carreira feat. Anselmo Ralph	"Baby Fica"	No	No	No	Yes
David Fonseca	"What Life Is For"	No	No	No	Yes
Demi Lovato	"Let It Go"	Yes	Yes	Yes	Yes
Disclosure Feat. Aluna George	"White Noise"	Yes	No	No	No
Ed Sheeran	"Lego House"	Yes	No	Yes	No
Ellie Goulding	"Burn"	Yes	Yes	Yes	No
Enej	"Skrzydlate Ręce"	No	No	Yes	No
Expensive Soul	"O Amor é Mágico"	No	No	No	Yes
Humanos	"Maria Albertina"	No	No	No	Yes
Icona Pop feat. Charli XCX	"I Love It"	Yes	Yes	Yes	Yes
Igor Herbut	"Wkręceni – nie ufaj mi"	No	No	Yes	No
João Pedro Pais	"Mentira"	No	No	No	Yes
John Newman	"Love Me Again"	Yes	No	Yes	Yes
Jula	"Za Każdym Razem"	No	No	Yes	No
Kylie Minogue	"Can't Get You Out Of My Head"	Yes	Yes	Yes	Yes
Lady Gaga	"Born This Way"	Yes	No	Yes	Yes
Lionel Richie	"Hello"	Yes	No	Yes	No
Lorde	"Royals"	Yes	Yes	Yes	Yes
Miguel Araújo	"Os Maridos Das Outras"	No	No	No	Yes
Naughty Boy Feat. Sam Smith	"La La La"	Yes	No	No	No
Olly Murs	"Dear Darlin'"	Yes	Yes	No	No
One Direction	"Best Song Ever"	Yes	Yes	Yes	Yes
OneRepublic	"Counting Stars"	Yes	Yes	No	Yes
P!nk feat. Nate Ruess	"Just Give Me a Reason"	Yes	Yes	Yes	Yes
Paramore	"Still Into You"	Yes	No	No	No
Paulo Gonzo	"Jardins Proibidos"	No	No	No	Yes
Per7Ume	"Intervalo"	No	No	No	Yes
Pet Shop Boys feat. Dusty Springfield	"What Have I Done To Deserve This?"	Yes	No	No	No
Pharrell Williams	"Happy"	Yes	Yes	Yes	Yes
Piersi	"Bałkanica"	No	No	Yes	No
Plan B	"She Said"	Yes	No	Yes	No
Rafał Brzozowski	"Tak Blisko"	No	No	Yes	No
Rui Veloso	"A Paixão"	No	No	No	Yes
Santos e Pecadores	"Não voltarei a ser fiel"	No	No	No	Yes
Selena Gomez	"Come & Get It"	Yes	No	Yes	No
Silence 4	"Borrow"	No	No	No	Yes
Swedish House Mafia feat. John Martin	"Don't You Worry Child"	Yes	Yes	Yes	No
Sylwia Grzeszczak	"Pożyczony"	No	No	Yes	No
The Lumineers	"Ho Hey"	Yes	No	No	Yes
TLC	"No Scrubs"	Yes	No	Yes	No
Tony Carreira	"Porque é que vens"	No	No	No	Yes
Train	"Drive By"	Yes	No	No	Yes
Weekend	"Ona Tańczy Dla Mnie"	No	No	Yes	No
Xavier Naidoo	"Der Letzte Blick"	No	Yes	No	No
Zakopower	"Boso"	No	No	Yes	No
Artist	Song title	UK	DE	PL	PT

=== SingStar Starter Pack ===
Artist	Song title	UK	DE
Lady Gaga	"Poker Face"	Yes	Yes
Pet Shop Boys	"Go West"	No	Yes
James Morrison feat. Nelly Furtado	"Broken Strings"	No	Yes
Mando Diao	"Dance With Somebody"	No	Yes
Razorlight	"Wire To Wire"	No	Yes
Elton John	"Your Song"	Yes	No
Bryan Adams and Mel C	"When You're Gone"	Yes	No
James Brown	"I Got You (I Feel Good)"	Yes	No
Mark Ronson feat. Lily Allen	"Oh My God"	Yes	No
Artist	Song title	UK	DE

== See also ==
- List of songs in SingStar games (PlayStation 2)
