= Przeznaczenie =

Studio album by Ewelina Flinta
- Released: 25 April 2003
- Genre: Pop rock
- Languages: Polish; English
- Labels: BMG Poland; Zic Zac
- Producer: Tomasz Bonarowski

Ewelina Flinta chronology
Przeznaczenie (2003)	Nie znasz mnie (2005)

Professional ratings
Review scores
Source	Rating
Codzienna Gazeta Muzyczna	4/5 stars
Onet.pl	Mixed
Wprost	2/5 stars

Przeznaczenie (English: Destiny) is the debut studio album by Polish singer Ewelina Flinta, released in 2003 by BMG Poland. It was a commercial success in Poland; it reached number 2 on the albums chart and achieved a gold sales status. The album spawned major hits "Żałuję" and "Goniąc za cieniem".

== Background ==
In June 2002, Flinta came second in the first season of Idol, Polish singing talent show. She subsequently started working on her debut album, inspired by the rock music and the late 60s.

The album's first single, "Żałuję", was a big hit in Poland, reaching number 1 on the national airplay chart. It was followed by "Goniąc za cieniem" which peaked at number 2. The third and final single from the album was the title track, which reached number 13.

The album was released by the Zic Zac label, part of BMG Poland, on 25 April 2003 and debuted at number 2 on the Polish sales chart. In July 2003, it achieved a gold certification in Poland for sales exceeding 35,000 copies.

== Track listing ==
1. "Goniąc za cieniem" – 3:32
2. "Tajemnice" – 3:30
3. "Nie wiesz nic" – 3:44
4. "Żałuję" – 3:33
5. "Respect" – 2:53
6. "ICQ" – 5:56
7. "Moja sprawa" – 3:37
8. "Przeznaczenie" – 3:42
9. "Nieobecna" – 4:29
10. "Wiary nie masz" – 3:05
11. "Wolna" – 3:58
12. "Agape" – 4:32
13. "Nadzieja" (with IRA) – 4:18
14. "Niepodobna" – 3:33

== Charts ==
Chart (2003)	Peak position
Poland (OLiS)	2
Europe (European Top 100 Albums)	77

== Certifications ==
Region	Certification	Sales
Poland (ZPAV)	Gold	35,000
