= Artur Gadowski =

Polish singer and guitarist

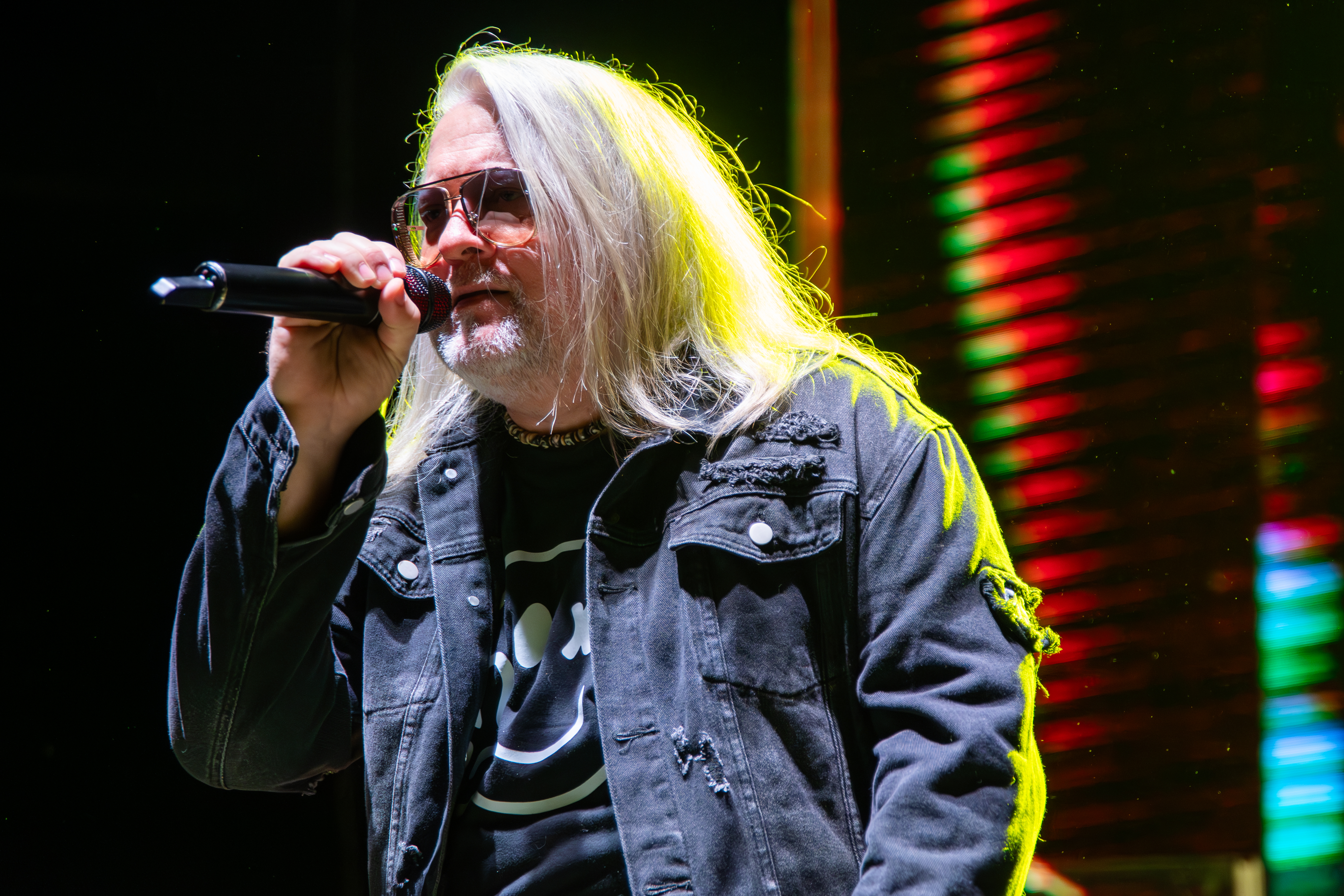
- Artur Gadowski, Gdynia, 2025
- Born: Artur Dionizy Gadowski; 1 June 1967 (age 59); Szydłowiec, Poland
- Occupations: Singer, musician
- Musical career
- Genres: Rock, pop rock, pop
- Instruments: Vocals, guitar
- Years active: 1985—present
- Labels: Zic Zac, BMG Poland, Agencja Artystyczna MTJ

Artur Gadowski [ˈartur ɡaˈdɔfski] (born 1 June 1967) is a Polish musician, vocalist of a rock band IRA.

== Biography ==
Gadowski comes from a musical family. His father played the saxophone whereas his mother was a vocal instructor. His life's turning point happened in 1979 when he first heard The Beatles' album titled Sgt. Pepper's Lonely Hearts Club Band, which formed his musical style for a long time afterwards.

=== Beginnings and career with IRA ===
In 1985, he established his first amateur music band together with his schoolmates, Kurcze blade, dissolved after merely a year. Then in 1986 he co-founded another band, Landrynki dla dziewczynki, in which Gadowski initially played the guitar but he later replaced the vocalist of the group who had been called up. The band gave many concerts at that time stirring up an interest, but they did not manage to qualify for the Jarocin Festival. During the band's performance in a club in Radom, Gadowski along with his group were spotted by Kuba Płucisz who was seeking a vocalist for his new music project. Artur Gadowski met Płucisz a few days later and received a proposal from him, accepting it. Meanwhile, he continued his education attending a night secondary school. When the members of the group which was being founded were selected, the new band began their first rehearsals in an amphitheatre in Radom.

IRA was officially launched in November 1987. They gave successful performances during various festivals and contests, gaining interest and awards. After one of those concerts, IRA were invited to take part in the National Festival of Polish Song in Opole, in which they presented themselves to the public in 1988. Gadowski was granted an award as a vocalist during that festival. The band debuted with their first album in December 1989 and toured all over Poland as well as in the former USSR. IRA became the most marvellous rock band in Poland in the first half of the 1990s. Band's albums Mój dom, 1993 rok and IRA Live assured their rapid success. They performed about 150 concerts all around the country each year as well as opening acts for well-known rock and hard rock bands from abroad, e.g. Aerosmith in 1994. However, in the second half of the decade, the band fell into crisis which led to its suspension in 1996.

=== Solo career ===
From this moment on, Gadowski started his solo career. He signed a contract with Bertelsmann Music Group (BMG). The first album was intended to be released in October 1996, but the recorded material did not satisfy the vocalist. In 1997, Gadowski recorded a song Szczęśliwego Nowego Jorku (Happy New York) together with Marek Kościkiewicz of De Mono. The song promoted a film with the same title, which turned out to be a hit that reached leading places in music charts. Works on Gadowski's first solo album were resumed in 1998 but only one of the records which were found in the album's first version appeared on the CD published on 20 April.

Gadowski participated in Opole Festival in the same year, i.e. 1998. Then he performed three songs: Na kredyt, Szczęśliwego Nowego Jorku and a song by Czerwone Gitary titled Biały krzyż. At that time, he also collaborated with other artists, including Zbigniew Hołdys. On 30 September, he performed before the concert of Queen's guitarist, Brian May in Warsaw. He sang a duet with Anna Maria Jopek at another occasion. In February 2000, Gadowski took up composing soundtracks for TVP2 programs. The following month brought his second album G.A.D.. All of the lyrics were written by Krzysztof Jaryczewski, whereas the very songs were composed by a Swedish producer Mark Tysper. In the same month, Gadowski appeared on stage before Joe Cocker at concerts in Warsaw and Poznań.

He also sang (with Ryszard Rynkowski and Grzegorz Markowski) a song titled Najlepszy z najlepszych (The best of the best) which was the official hymn of the Polish Olympic team in 2000.

=== Reactivation of the band ===
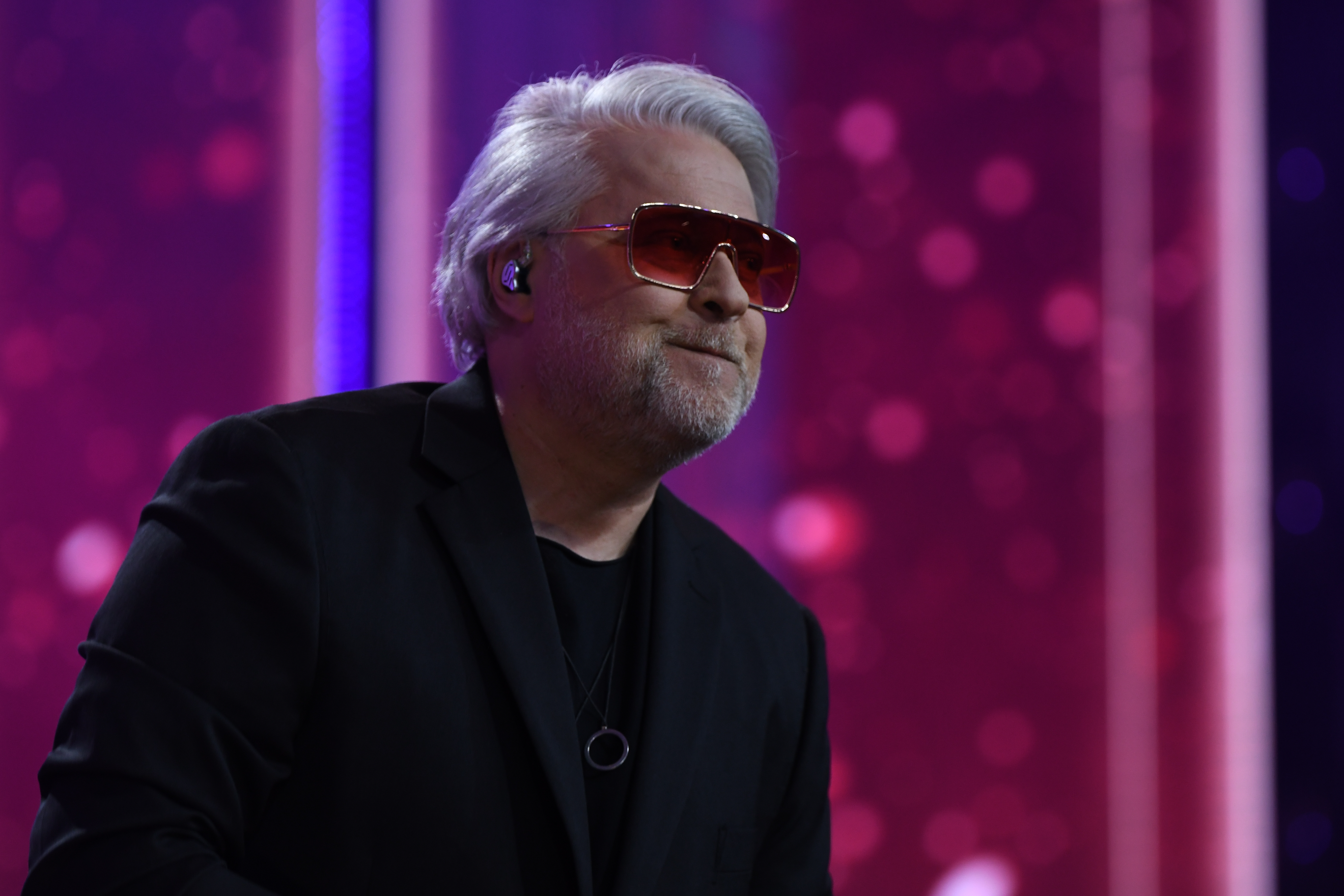
Gadowski in Sopot, 2023

A deteriorating financial situation, however, forced him to go to America with Piotr Sujka and Wojciech Owczarek of IRA, to work on a building site. There they played their old repertoire on days off. They employed a guitarist, Tomasz Ciastko, and started to perform in clubs. After their return to Poland, they reactivated the band, at first as Artur Gadowski & IRA. Gadowski has recorded albums with the band as well as given plenty of concerts all over Poland since then. In addition, he has appeared as guest performer on the albums of other artists, including Ewelina Flinta and Krzysztof Jaryczewski. The year 2003 brought the 15th anniversary of IRA's existence. On that occasion the whole group gave a jubilee concert in Radom.

=== Health problems in 2004 ===
At the end of 2004, Artur Gadowski started to have problems with his voice and was operated on on 18 October because of ineffectiveness of the treatment he had undergone with use of medicines. His goitre was removed, but suddenly some serious and unexpected complications appeared, leaving him unconscious for two days. Eventually he recovered and soon regained his voice as well as his physical strength. He was able to play with his band again in 2006.

=== After recovery ===
Apart from other appearances, he took part in an annual charity concert organized by Anna Dymna on the Main Market Square in Cracow. On 15 October he was guest on a TV show Weekend z Gwiazdą (Weekend with the Star) which was, by way of an exception, broadcast from the Stansted airport near London, UK. On 15 December he appeared on a special concert in Toruń dedicated to a Polish musician, Grzegorz Ciechowski. At the beginning of 2008 Gadowski sang a duet with a vocalist of a debuting band, Nefer. They recorded a song titled Samotni w sieci (The lonely on the net). Gadowski was the author of lyrics for the song.

== Discography ==
=== Albums with the band IRA ===
- IRA (1989)
- Mój dom (1991) (PL Gold, Platinum)
- 1993 rok (1993) (Gold)
- IRA Live (1993) (Gold)
- Znamię (1994) (Gold)
- Ogrody (1995)
- Tu i Teraz (2002)
- Ogień (2004)
- IRA Live 15-lecie (2004)
- Londyn 08:15 (2007)
- 9 (2009)
- X (2013)
- "My" (2016)
- "Jutro" (2021)

=== Albums as a Solo Artist ===
- Artur Gadowski (1998)
- G.A.D. (2000)
