= Adam Palma =

Polish guitarist

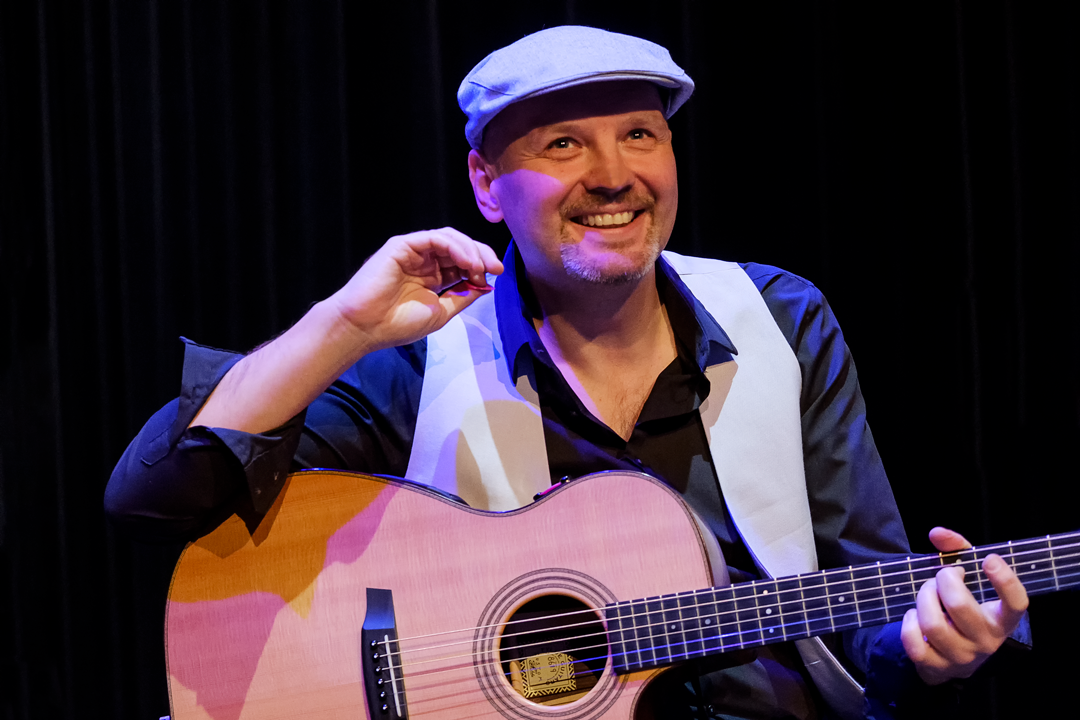
- Adam Palma in 2019

Background information
- Born: 9 July 1974 (age 51); Łódź
- Origin: Poland
- Occupation: Guitarist
- Instrument: Guitar
- Website: www.adampalma.co.uk

Adam Palma (born 9 July 1974 in Łódź, Poland) is a Polish-British guitarist and teacher. He teaches guitar at the University of Salford.

== Biography ==
Palma was born on 9 July 1974 in Łódź, Poland. He began playing the guitar at the age 12. He graduated from III Liceum Ogólnokształcące im. Marii Konopnickiej we Włocławku in Włocławek. He obtained his doctoral degree in music (DMA) in 2017 at The Music Academy in Gdańsk. After moving to Manchester in 2006, he began performing as a solo artist. Palma has performed with well-known guitarists such as Al Di Meola, Tommy Emmanuel and Biréli Lagrène. He also has performed with many Polish musicians including Edyta Górniak, Janusz Olejniczak, Leszek Możdżer, Krzesimir Dębski, Ewa Bem, Ewelina Flinta, and Kuba Badach, as a session player.

Palma's album Adam Palma Meet Chopin (2019) was the first interpretation of Chopin's music on the acoustic guitar. The album was named as one of The best jazz recordings of 2020 to date by Chicago Tribune.

Palma participated in “100 years - The Centenary of Polish Independence” concert at The Royal Albert Hall in 2018. He played alongside Leszek Możdżer.

Palma has also performed live on Polish TV channels such as Telewizja Polska, TVP Polonia and TVP1.

In 2020, Palma spent 40 days in a coma due to COVID-19.

Adam Palma is a professor of jazz guitar at The Music Academy in Gdansk in Poland and a guitar tutor at The University of Salford in the UK.

== Discography ==
- 2010: Good Morning
- 2012: 2012
- 2014: Acoustic Blues Adventures with Adam Palma
- 2017: Palm-istry
- 2019: Adam Palma Meets Chopin
- 2022: Second Life

== Awards and recognition ==
- 2014: he received ‘Best Acoustic Guitarist Award’ at Guitar Awards Gala in Warsaw.
- 2018: he was awarded the Main Prize in the Art category by the Mayor of Włocławek
- 2020: he was honored with a Medal for Merit to Culture (Gloria Artis) in Poland.
- 2022: Palma was honoured as a Titular Professor by the President of Poland.
