= Goniąc za cieniem =

Single by Ewelina Flinta

from the album Przeznaczenie
- Released: 14 June 2003
- Recorded: 2003
- Genre: Pop rock
- Length: 3:32
- Label: BMG Poland; Zic Zac
- Songwriters: Andrew Todd; Tim Laurer; Ewa Warszawska
- Producer: Tomasz Bonarowski

Ewelina Flinta singles chronology
"Żałuję" (2003)	"Goniąc za cieniem" (2003)	"Przeznaczenie" (2003)

Music video
- "Goniąc za cieniem" on YouTube

"Goniąc za cieniem" (English: "Chasing a Shadow") is a 2003 pop rock song by Polish singer Ewelina Flinta from her debut album Przeznaczenie. It was released as the album's second single and reached number 2 on the Polish airplay chart.

== Background ==
The song was originally written by Andrew Todd and Tim Laurer as "Chasing Shadows". The Polish-language lyrics were later written by Ewa Warszawska. "Goniąc za cieniem" was released on 14 June 2003 as the second single from Flinta's debut album Przeznaczenie, following up the major hit "Żałuję". It also turned out a commercial success, peaking at number 2 on the national airplay chart.

== Music video ==
The music video for the song was filmed on 4 June 2003 in Kazimierz Dolny in Eastern Poland, and was directed by Artur Brzeziński. The clip pictures Flinta getting about the town, wading in the Vistula river, and performing the song in the main market with her band in the evening.

== Charts ==
Chart (2003)	Peak position
Poland Airplay (ZPAV)	2
