= Just Girls =

Portuguese girl group

- Origin: Lisbon, Portugal
- Genre: Pop
- Years active: 2007–2010; 2024
- Label: Farol Música
- Members: Ana Maria Velez; Diana Monteiro; Helga Posser; Kiara Timas
- Website: www.justgirls.pt

Just Girls are a Portuguese girl group consisting of Ana Maria Velez, Diana Monteiro, Helga Posser and Kiara Timas.

The band was created when TVI cast a band for the popular Portuguese TV show: Morangos com Açucar.

On the TV show, they played characters Carolina, Anabela, Xana and Alice.

On the 26th of November 2007, their first album, "Just Girls" was released.

"Just Girls" has been certified four times platinum in Portugal. Some of the hits of this album are: "Não Te Deixes Vencer"; "Bye, Bye"; "O Jogo Já Começou" e a "Vida Te Espera".

The group members did voice acting on the movie: Winx: The Secret of the Lost Kingdom.

On the 30th of June 2008 their first DVD ''Canta e Dança com Elas'' was released, it was certified 4 times platinum on the week that it was released.

Their second album, "Play Me", was released on the 24 of November 2008, it has been certified two times platinum in Portugal. They sold over 220,000 records in Portugal.

On the 19th of July 2009, the group released their Live DVD ''Just Girls: Ao vivo no Campo Pequeno", it was recorded in March in a special concert. It was one of the most sold DVDs in Portugal that year. It was one time certified platinum and was in first place in the charts throughout several weeks.

After releasing and promoting their 2010 album ''Popstars'' the girls band was on a hiatus of 13 years.

They made their official comeback on 8th of June 2024 at the special show A REUNIÃO: MORANGOS COM AÇÚCAR at passeio maritimo de algés.

Just Girls discography
- Studio albums: 3
- Singles: 10
- Music videos: 6

== Discography ==
=== Studio albums ===
Year	Title	Chart positions	Certifications (sales thresholds)
Year	Title	POR	Certifications (sales thresholds)
2007	Just Girls: Released: 2007; Label: Farol Musica	1	AFP certification: 4xPlatinum; Portugal sales: 90,000+; Worldwide sales: 90,000+
2008	Play Me: Released: 2008; Label: Farol Musica	2	AFP certification: 2xPlatinum; Portugal sales: 50,000+; Worldwide sales: 50,000+
2010	Popstars: Released: 2010; Label: Farol Musica	12: AFP certification: -; Portugal sales: -; Worldwide sales: -	
2010	Bye, Bye (O melhor das Just Girls): Released: 2010; Label: Farol Musica	-	

=== Singles ===
Year	Title	Chart Positions	Album
Year	Title	POR	Album
2007	"O Jogo Já Começou"	11	Just Girls
2007	"Bye Bye (Vou-me Divertir)"	-	Just Girls
	"Não te deixes vencer"	-	
	"A Vida Te Espera "	-	
2008	"Ser Radical"	-	Play Me
2009	"Não te deixes vencer"	-	Play Me
2009	"Entre o Sonho e a Ilusão"	50	Play Me
2009	"A Vida Te Espera "	-	Play Me
2010	"Cansei" ft. Angélico	-	Angélico
2010	"Popstars"	-	Pop Stars

The Single "O Jogo Já Começou" entered the chart on position 23 and it peaked on number 11.

=== Year-end chart ===
"O Jogo Já Começou"

2008	Portugal Singles Chart	21

=== Music videos ===
- "O Jogo Já Começou" (2007)
- "Não te deixes vencer" (2007)
- "A Vida te espera" (2008)
- "Ser Radical" (2009)
- "Entre o Sonho e a Ilusão" (2009)
- "Popstars" (2010)

== DVDs ==
Year	Title	Chart positions	Certifications (sales thresholds)
Year	Title	POR	Certifications (sales thresholds)
2008	Dança e Canta com Elas: Release date: 2008; Label: Farol Musica	1	AFP certification: 4xPlatinum; Portugal sales: 90,000+; Worldwide sales: 90,000+
2009	Ao Vivo no Campo Pequeno: Release date: 2009; Label: Farol Musica	2	AFP certification: Platinum; Portugal sales: 25,000+; Worldwide sales: 25,000+
