= Feel (Feel album) =

Studio album by Feel
- Released: October 26, 2007
- Recorded: 2007
- Genre: Pop rock
- Label: EMI Music Poland

Feel chronology
Feel (2007)	Feel 2 (2009)

Singles from Feel
- 1. "A Gdy Jest Już Ciemno"; 2. "No Pokaż Na Co Cię Stać"; 3. "Jak Anioła Głos"; 4. "Pokonaj Siebie"; 5. "W Odpowiedzi Na Twój List"

Feel is the first album released by Polish pop rock band Feel. The album earned Diamond certification in Poland.

== Track listing ==
1. "A gdy jest już ciemno"
2. "No pokaż na co cię stać"
3. "W odpowiedzi na twój list"
4. "W ciemną noc"
5. "Jak anioła głos"
6. "To długa rzeka"
7. "Nasze słowa, nasze dni"
8. "Paul"
9. "Ale kiedy przy mnie śpisz"
10. "To jest taka gra"
11. "Sweet Harmony"
