= Ira (Polish band) =

Polish rock band

IRA
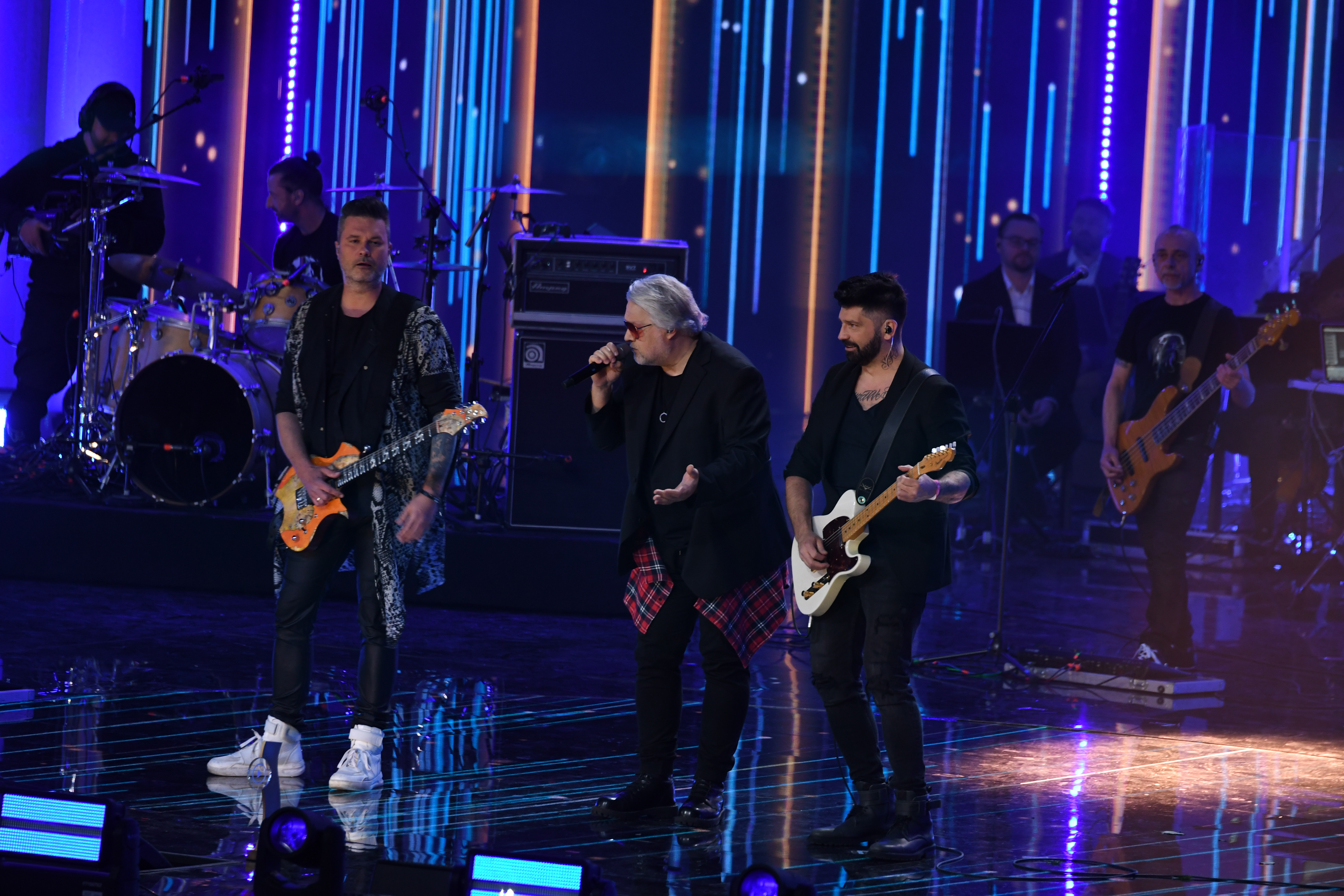
- Ira in 2023

Background information
- Origin: Radom, Poland
- Genres: rock, hard rock, pop-rock
- Years active: 1987–1996, 1998, 2001–present
- Labels: Proint, Kontakt, TOP Music, Akar, Zic-Zac, BMG Poland, QL Music, My Music
- Members: Artur Gadowski; Piotr Sujka; Wojciech Owczarek; Sebastian Piekarek; Piotr Konca
- Past members: Kuba Płucisz; Dariusz Grudzień; Grzegorz Wawrzeńczyk; Tomasz Bracichowicz; Piotr Łukaszewski; Jarosław Zarychta; Paweł Matracki; Zbigniew Suski; Marcin Bracichowicz; Maciek Gładysz
- Website: https://zespolira.pl

IRA is a Polish rock band formed in 1987 in Radom by Jakub Płucisz (guitar). They gained wide popularity in Poland in the early nineties, mainly after releasing the "Mój Dom" album, with the hit title song, which dates back to their garage and semi-professional days. They also gained some local popularity amongst Polish-speaking citizens in the United States, where they lived and worked for few months. After signing a professional contract back in Poland, they released a few albums which did not prove to be commercially successful (except for the "Mój Dom" follow-up, which was "IRA 1993"), and the band disbanded afterwards. Artur Gadowski started a solo career. He opened for Brian May before his show in Warsaw in September 1998. Artur's solo efforts were not very successful either, and what success he did gain was largely based on the then high profile of IRA.

A few years later the band reunited, and remains active. Once again, they have not attained much popularity, but are well known amongst hard rock fans in Poland, and their concerts are well attended.

The name "IRA" comes from a Latin word ira, meaning anger (this was the band founders' intention). However, this has been mistaken for the acronym of the Irish Republican Army.

== Members ==
- Artur Gadowski - vocals (1987-1996, 1998, 2001-present), guitars (1987, 2001)
- Sebastian Piekarek - guitars (2003-2005, 2015-present)
- Piotr Konca - guitars (2005-present)
- Piotr "Jinx" Sujka - bass guitar (1989-1996, 1998, 2001-present)
- Wojciech Owczarek - drums (1987-1996, 1998, 2001-present)

=== Current touring members ===
- Marcin Trojanowicz - keyboards, accordion (occasionally 2009-present)

== Former members ==
- Jakub Płucisz - guitars, founder (1987-1996, 1998)
- Paweł Matracki - guitars (1990-1991)
- Piotr "Peter" Łukaszewski - solo guitar (1991-1996)
- Zbigniew Suski - guitars (2001-2003)
- Maciej Gładysz - guitars (2003-2005)
- Marcin Bracichowicz - guitars (2003-2015)
- Dariusz Grudzień - bass guitar (1987-1989)
- Grzegorz Wawrzeńczyk - keyboards (1987-1988, died in 2012)
- Tomasz Bracichowicz - keyboards (1988-1989)
- Jarosław Zarychta - keyboards (1989-1991)

=== Former touring members ===
- Tomasz Czyżewski - solo guitar (1992, 1993, 1998)
- Tomasz Ciastko - guitars (2001)
- Wojciech Gadaszewski - keyboards (acoustic concerts 2022)

== Discography ==
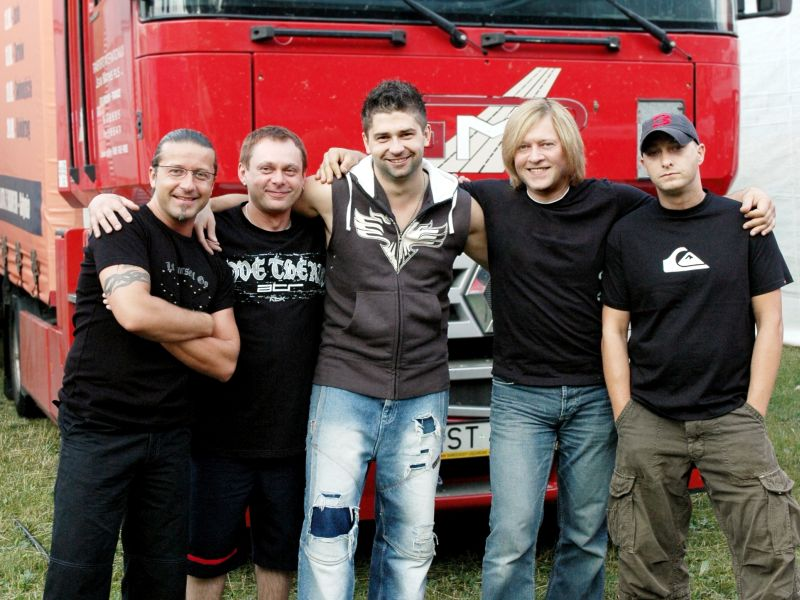
Ira in 2007

Title	Album details	Peak chart positions	Sales	Certifications
Title	Album details	POL	Sales	Certifications
Ira	Released: December 1989; Label: Pronit; Formats: CD, CS	—		
Mój dom (My home)	Released: June 1991; Label: Kontakt, Top Music; Formats: CD, CS	—		
1993 rok (Year 1993)	Released: 16 April 1993; Label: Top Music; Formats: CD, CS	—		
Znamię (Mark)	Released: 1 September 1994; Label: Top Music; Formats: CD, CS	—		
Ogrody (Gardens)	Released: 28 September 1995; Label: Zic Zac; Formats: CD, CS	—		
Tu i teraz (Here and now)	Released: 12 August 2002; Label: BMG Poland; Formats: CD	24		
Ogień (Fire)	Released: 29 April 2004; Label: El Mariach; Formats: CD	2		
Londyn 08:15 (08:15 London)	Released: 3 September 2007; Label: QL Music; Formats: CD	1		
9	Released: 2 November 2009; Label: QL Music; Formats: CD, digital download	15	POL: 15,000+	POL: Gold
X	Released: 16 April 2013; Label: My Music; Formats: CD, digital download	4		
My (We)	Released: 20 May 2016; Label: Polskie Radio; Formats: CD, digital download			
Jutro (Tomorrow)	Released: 14 May 2021; Label: Universal Music Group; Formats: CD, digital download			
"—" denotes a recording that did not chart or was not released in that territory.
