= Rose (French singer) =

French singer

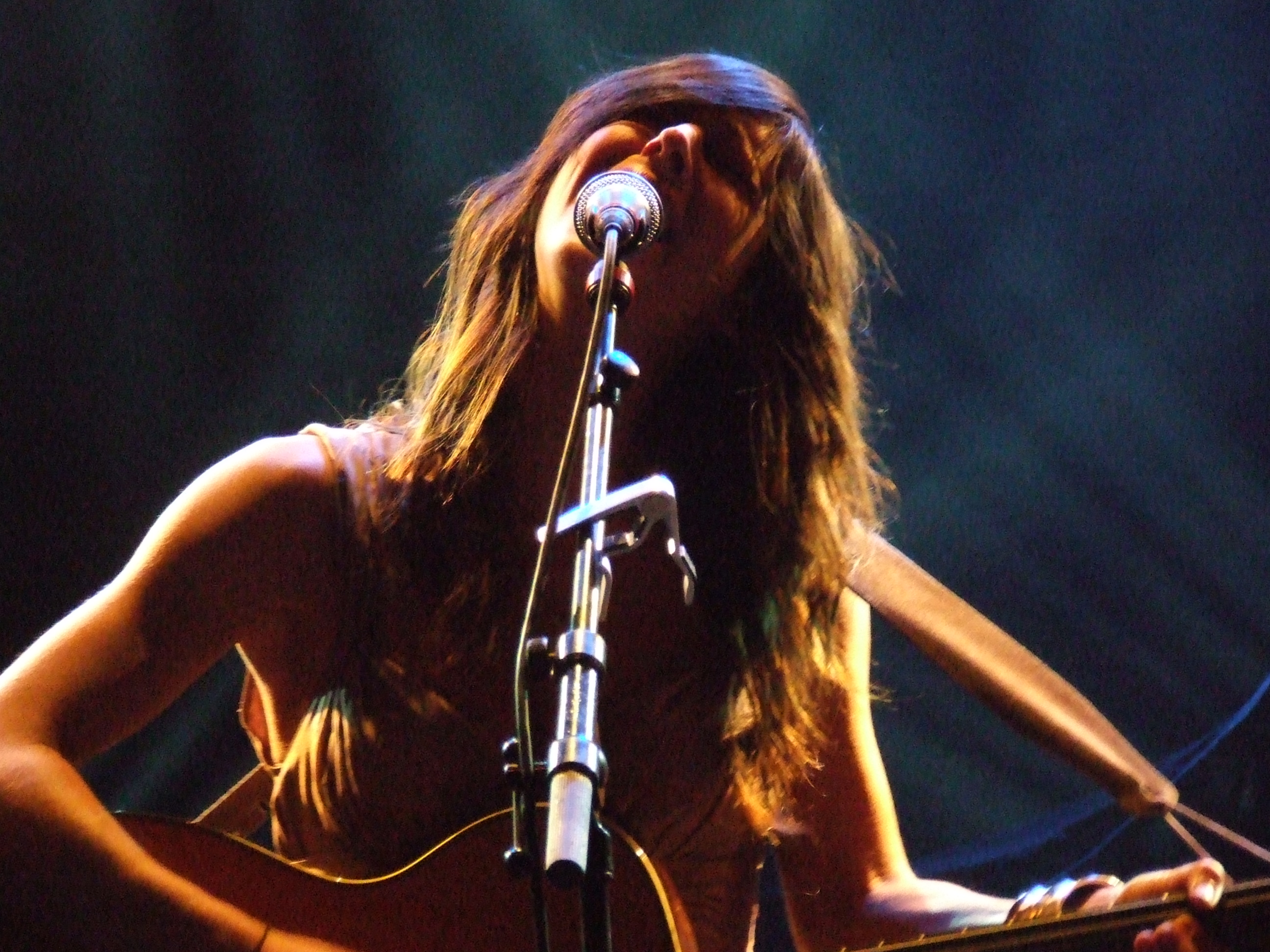
- Rose performing in 2008

Background information
- Born: Keren Meloul; 24 May 1978 (age 48); Nice, France
- Genres: Pop
- Occupation: Singer
- Years active: 2006–present
- Spouse: Julien Bensenior (m. 2008; div. 2009)
- Website: www.rose-lesite.fr

Keren Meloul (born May 24, 1978), better known as Rose, is a French singer, songwriter, author and composer.

After studying law, she became a school teacher, at the Jewish Merkaz Ohr Joseph in the 19th arrondissement of Paris before launching into music. She gained fame in 2006 with the single "La Liste" followed by a similarly titled album. She got a boost when French singer Alain Souchon invited her to open for him at l'Olympia de Paris and at Zénith de Paris in 2006. In 2007 she started her own tour and appeared at La Cigale, a second time at l'Olympia and at the first part of her husband Bensé's concert, and in Montreal in 2008.

In 2009, she recorded her second album Les Souvenirs sous ma frange, produced by Jérôme Plasseraud and Thibaut Barbillon, both members of the group 1973. In 2013 she followed that up with a third album Et puis juin.

In addition, she has written songs for other artists, notably for Jenifer, appeared in a charity single for Les voix de l'enfant, project of La Fondation Abbé Pierre, and in Sidaction in a duet with Alain Souchon. She also took part in the album We Love Disney with the song "Au bout du rêve".

== Personal life ==
Her maternal grandfather immigrated from Italy to France. Her mother was an interior designer and her father a pied noir and a real estate agent.

Rose married singer songwriter Bensé (real name Julien Bensenior) in a civil court on 24 June 2008, followed by a religious marriage on 24 August 2008 in Var. The couple divorced in November 2009. In June 2011, Rose had a baby boy.

== Discography ==
=== Albums ===
Title	Year	Peak positions			
Title	Year	FR	BEL (Fl)	BEL (Wa)	SWI
Rose	2006	5	–	13	58
Les souvenirs sous ma frange	2009	7	–	15	60
Et puis juin	2013	14	194	37	–
Pink Lady	2015	41	–	34	–
Kerosene	2019	60	–	–	–
"—" denotes releases that did not chart or were not released in that region.

=== Singles ===
Title	Year	Peak positions	Album
Title	Year	FR	Album
"Sombre con"	2008	35	Les souvenirs sous ma frange
"Et puis juin"	2009	132	Et puis juin
