= Najoua Belyzel =

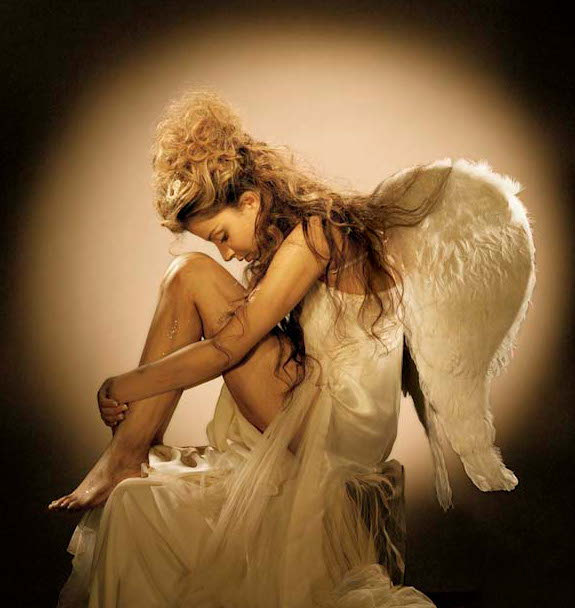

Background information
- Born: Najoua Mazouri; 15 December 1981 (age 44)
- Origin: Nancy, Lorraine, France
- Genres: Pop rock, electronic
- Occupation: Singer
- Years active: 2005–present
- Labels: Scorpio Music, Sony Music Entertainment
- Website: Official site (in French)

Najoua Belyzel (born Najoua Mazouri; 15 December 1981, in Nancy, France) is a French pop rock/electronic singer of Moroccan and Egyptian descent.

== Biography ==
Najoua was born in Nancy, France to a Moroccan father and an Egyptian mother and grew up in a large family with three sisters and two brothers. Since childhood she showed an interest in music; by age 14, she had begun writing her own songs.

Starting in 2001, Najoua studied law at the University of Nancy, but left for Paris to pursue a career in music. She initially met success when she joined the group Benoît, who had a successful single called "Tourne-toi Benoît", which touched on the subject of homosexuality. The later singles from Benoit, however, only met with moderate success and eventually the group disbanded.

Najoua kept on working with the group's songwriter Christophe Casanave whose work had already been performed by popular French acts Steeve Estatof and Marc Lavoine. The two worked together on a song called "Stella", which would later appear on her debut album. The song "Née de l'amour et de la haine" was Belyzel's first demo in 2002.

In 2005, Najoua released her first single, titled "Gabriel" (The Angel Gabriel), an electro-pop dance track, which became her signature song. A video was released to accompany the single by telling the 'story' behind the song: the video showed Najoua wearing angel wings while being attended by seraphs. She recently adopted the sitting Angel profile portrait of herself and used it on the album as her motif.

Gabriel became a huge hit in France, Belgium, and Quebec, making it her best selling single which peaked at #3 on the Top 40 charts in France. Najoua also developed a dramatic stage routine to encapsulate the song and its highly charged emotional content as was demonstrated in the celebrated 'back to school' performance in Lille in 2006. Najoua has said that the song has nothing to do with gay issues, as has been suggested, but concerns the unlikely love of a human girl for an archangel and questioned whether that can be reciprocated. So it's about Angelsexuality - not homosexuality.

The video ends with Gabriel being 'awakened' from stone with a kiss and his world is shattered (literally). The video was shot in the stark interior and grounds of the ruined ancient Cistercian Abbaye de Notre-Dame du Val à MERIEL

On May 29, 2006, she released her debut album titled Entre deux mondes, which debuted at #7 on the French charts and at #1 on the iTunes France music store. In late 2006-2007, she embarked on a tour with other artists across France and Francophone Europe to promote her album. Two other singles were released, "Je Ferme les Yeux" in June 2006, which was also an electro-pop title, but it met with less success than "Gabriel." The theme was a prayer to God to make this world better. The third single was "Comme Toi" a song about duality and schizophrenia. The video clip featured two Najoua: a warrior-like blond and a trapped brunette. The album is mainly electro-pop with some ballads. It deals with different themes such as love, friendship (Stella), war, and pedophilia (Docteur Gel) along with her distress and disappointment when Najoua came to Paris (Bons Baisers de Paris)

Najoua Belyzel also released a new single, "Quand revient l'été ", on 10 September 2007.

She has been compared to Mylène Farmer, mainly because the video clip for "Gabriel" was shot in the same abbey as one of Mylene's clips ("Je te rends ton amour") and because they write about similar themes. Nonetheless, Najoua says she never wanted to copy Mylene and that they both have their distinctive universes.

During the summer of 2008, she released a cover song of Marie Laforêt "Viens, Viens", but it was not meant to be a single. Najoua returned with a new single "La Bienvenue". Some excerpts of the video clip were shown to her fans in December 2008 and the final clip was shown on TV in February 2009. The single became available on legal downloading platforms on 13 February. The song is about a girl who feels rejected in this world and who does not see the good in herself. The video features a mannequin who becomes alive (played by Najoua) who is then disappointed by the cruelty of the world and decides to return to her previous state.

Najoua's new album Au Feminin was released on 23 November 2009, three years after the first album. It includes a duet with Marc Lavoine called "Viola" as well as songs called "Hey Hey Hey, Ma Sainte-Nitouche, La Trève." Her song "Née de l'amour et de la haine" is also included.

In September 2014, after a period of five years, and much to the acclaim of her fans, Najoua released a new song "Rendez-Vous" with accompanying video, shot in the night by the banks of the Seine in a deserted Paris. There is an acoustic live performance video of Rendez-Vous filmed under a bridge over the Seine at night. Najoua has parted with her previous label Scorpio and has released "Rendez-Vous" and a new album under 'Les Edition Gabriel'.

== Discography ==
=== Albums ===
- 2006 : Entre deux mondes (Also known as Entre deux mondes... En équilibre), #7 France, #46 Switzerland, 160,000 sales.
- 2009 : Au Féminin #66 France 10,000 sales
- 2019 : De la Lune au Soleil (Also known as Rendez-vous... De la lune au soleil) (03/15/2019)
- 2021 : Éternelle : Hommage à Marie Laforêt
- 2024 : Schizophonia

=== Singles ===
Year	Single	FR	QUE	BEL/Fr	RUS	GER	SWI	Album
2002	Tourne-toi Benoit (with Benoit)	16	-	-	-	-	-	-
2002	Comme Casanova (with Benoit)	79	-	-	-	-	-	-
2005	Gabriel	3	1	1	8	62	20	Entre deux mondes
2006	Je ferme les yeux	13	5	21	43	-	90	Entre deux mondes
2006	Comme toi	16	-	37	-	-	92	Entre deux mondes
2007	Quand revient l'été	10	-	25	-	-	-	Au féminin
2009	La bienvenue	9	-	-	-	-	-	Au féminin
2009	M (Hey, Hey, Hey)	20	-	-	-	-	-	Au féminin
2010	Ma Sainte-Nitouche	-	-	-	-	-	-	Au féminin
2014	Rendez-Vous	-	-	-	-	-	-	De la Lune au Soleil
2014	Que Sont-Ils Devenus ?	-	-	-	-	-	-	
2015	Luna	-	-	-	-	-	-	De la Lune au Soleil
2018	Cheveux aux vents	-	-	-	-	-	-	De la Lune au Soleil
2019	Tu me laisses aller	-	-	-	-	-	-	De la Lune au Soleil
2019	Le Fléau	-	-	-	-	-	-	De la Lune au Soleil
2019	Curiosa	-	-	-	-	-	-	De la Lune au Soleil
2020	Le con qui s'adore	-	-	-	-	-	-	De la Lune au Soleil
2023	Ton Guerrier Massaï	-	-	-	-	-	-	Schizophonia
2024	Paris Paris	-	-	-	-	-	-	Schizophonia
