= Żałuję =

Single by Ewelina Flinta

from the album Przeznaczenie
- Released: 3 March 2003
- Recorded: 2003
- Studio: Red Studio Pro; BonAir Studios
- Genre: Pop rock
- Length: 3:35
- Label: BMG Poland; Zic Zac
- Songwriters: Mirko Vukomanović; Luiza Staniec
- Producer: Tomasz Bonarowski

Ewelina Flinta singles chronology
"Może się wydawać" (2002)	"Żałuję" (2003)	"Goniąc za cieniem" (2003)

Music video
- "Żałuję" on YouTube

"Żałuję" (English: "I Regret") is the debut solo single by Polish singer Ewelina Flinta, released in 2003 to promote her debut album Przeznaczenie. It reached number 1 on the Polish airplay chart and remains one of Flinta's biggest hits.

== Background ==
"Żałuję" is a Polish adaptation of the song "Sama", released in 1998 by Serbian singer Ana Stanić. It was composed by Mirko Vukomanović, with lyrics by Snežana Vukomanović. The song was pitched to Flinta by Biljana Bakić, then-director of BMG Poland, who had heard it at a hairdresser's in Belgrade. New, Polish-language lyrics were written by Luiza Staniec.

The song originally had a heavier rock sound, but radio director Robert Kozyra – whose radio station was one of the proomoters of Flinta's album – forced a toned-down, more accessible production.

The song was released to Polish radio in March 2003 and quickly achieved mainstrem success, staying at the top of the national airplay chart for three consecutive weeks in May 2003.

A Czech version was recorded and released in 2004 by Aneta Langerová as "Skvělej nápad".

== Music video ==
The music video for the song was filmed in February 2003 on location in Warsaw. The clip pictures pensive Flinta sat in an empty room as well as performing the song as she strolls through crowds in the street and rides the Warsaw Metro.

== Track listings ==
- CD single
1. "Żałuję" – 3:35
- CD maxi single
1. "Żałuję" (Bogdan Kondracki Remix) – 3:13
2. "Aquarius" – 4:17
3. "Respect" – 2:53
4. "Nieobecna" – 4:29
5. "ICQ" – 5:56

== Charts ==
Chart (2003)	Peak position
Poland Airplay (ZPAV)	1
