= Feel (Polish band) =

Polish band

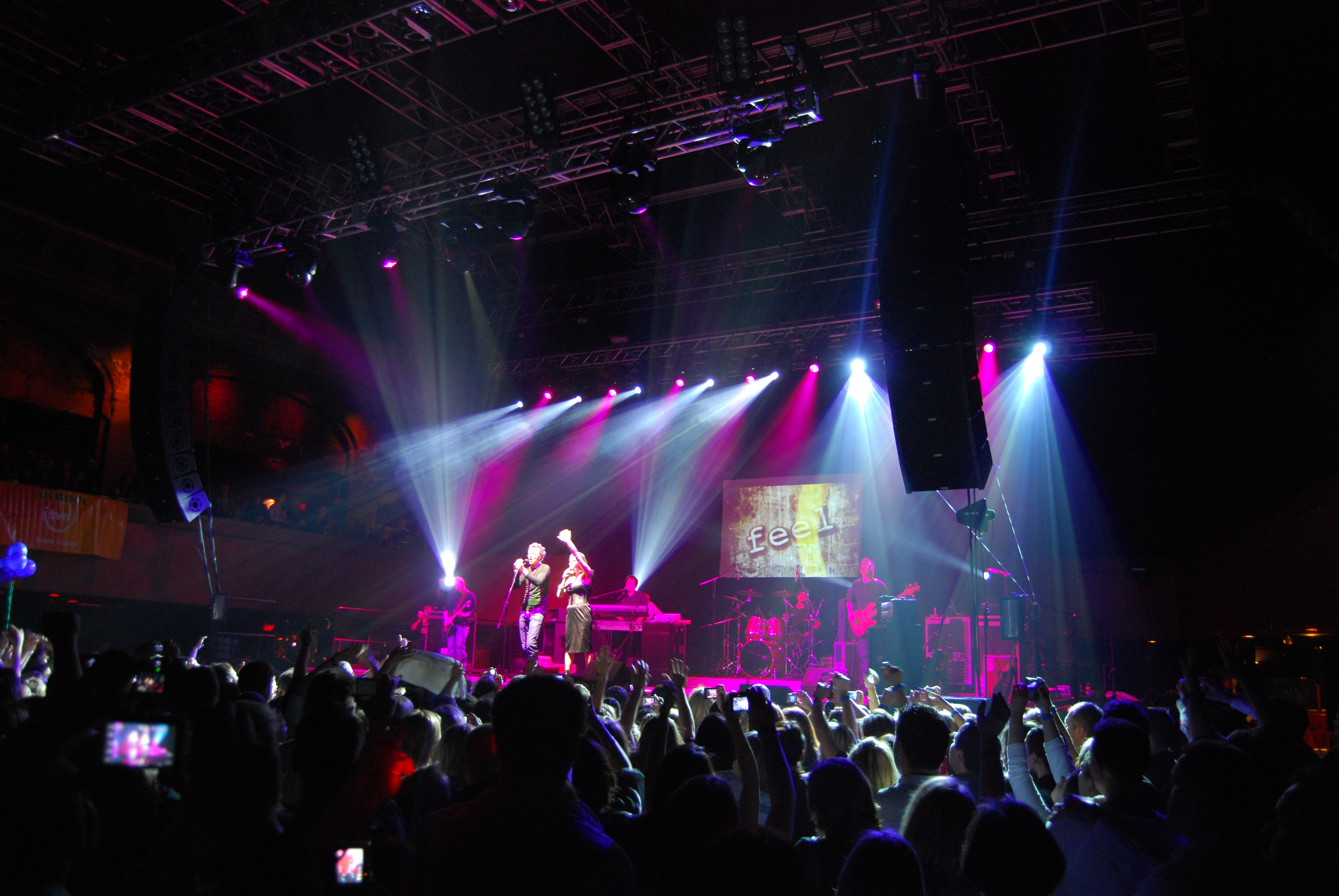
- Feel at Roseland Ballroom, 2009

Background information
- Origin: Katowice, Silesia, Poland
- Genres: Rock, pop
- Years active: 2005–present
- Labels: EMI Music Poland
- Members: Piotr Kupicha; Łukasz Kożuch; Michał Nowak; Michał Opaliński
- Website: http://www.feel.net.pl/

Feel is a Polish band which was formed in Katowice (Upper Silesia) in 2005. Originally called 'Q2', the band later adopted 'Kupicha Band' as its name and then finally 'Feel'.

The group released its debut album 'Feel' on November 26, 2007. Up to now their biggest success is winning the Bursztynowy Słowik (main award) as well as the People's Choice award at the 2007 Sopot International Song Festival with pop stars like Emmanuel Moire, Sophie Ellis-Bextor, Monrose, The Cloud Room, Thierry Amiel and September also in contention. The group enjoys great popularity in Poland, with both singles released so far achieving tremendous success, to the bewilderment of many independent music critics.

Their biggest hit, well known throughout the country, is called A gdy jest już ciemno (IPA: [a ɡdɨ jest juʂ t͡ɕemnɔ]) "And When the Dusk Comes". Other popular songs include No Pokaż Na Co Cię Stać ("Show Me What You Can Do"), Jak Anioła Głos ("Like an Angel's Voice"), Pokonaj Siebie ("Defeat Yourself"), W Odpowiedzi na Twój List ("In Reply To Your Letter") and Pokaż Mi Niebo ("Show Me The Sky")

The band covered the 1993 song "Sweet Harmony" by the Beloved.

== Discography ==
Title	Album details	Peak chart positions		Sales	Certifications
Title	Album details	POL	EUR	Sales	Certifications
Feel	Released: October 29, 2007; Label: EMI Music Poland; Formats: CD, digital download	1	59	POL: 200,000+	POL: Diamond
Feel 2	Released: June 8, 2009; Label: EMI Music Poland; Formats: CD, digital download	1	-	POL: 30,000+	POL: Platinum
Feel 3	Released: October 17, 2011; Label: EMI Music Poland; Formats: CD, digital download	13	-	POL: 15,000+	POL: Gold
Feel 5	Released: 23 September 2022	3	-		
"—" denotes a recording that did not chart or was not released in that territory.
