= Gabriel (Najoua Belyzel song) =

Single by Najoua Belyzel

from the album Entre deux mondes... en équilibre
- B-side: "Instrumental"
- Released: 7 November 2005
- Recorded: 2005
- Genre: Pop, electronica
- Length: 3:35
- Label: Scorpio, Sony Music
- Songwriter(s): Najoua Mazouri; Christophe Casanave
- Producer(s): Jean-François Berger; Christophe Casanave

Najoua Belyzel singles chronology
"Gabriel" (2005)	"Je ferme les yeux" (2006)

"Gabriel" is a 2005 song recorded by French artist Najoua Belyzel. It was her debut single from her album Entre deux mondes... en équilibre, on which it is the sixth track, and was released in November 2005. It achieved great success in Belgium (Wallonia) where it topped the chart, and in France. To date, it is Belyzel's most successful single in terms of peak positions and sales and can be deemed as her signature song.

== Song information ==
The music, written by Najoua Mazouri and composed by Christophe Casanave, is a mixture of pop and electronica. The style of voice is between Cranberries' singer Dolores O'Riordan (a little hoarse at times) and Mylène Farmer (rise in acute notes and singing on the breath). The lyrics are poetic ("Que ton âme se jette à l'eau dans mon corps océan", "Zéphyr"...) and there are several play on words ("Gabriel, s'attend (Satan) à plus qu'un sentiment...", "Qu'il en soit ainsi ("Ainsi soit-il (Amen)", ...).

The phrase "Es-tu fait pour lui, es-tu fait pour moi ?" was interpreted as a choice between the spiritual love for God ("Him") or the physical love for an mortal human, but it has often been incorrectly interpreted as a hesitation in a choice of sexual orientation (gay / bi or hetero).

In France, the song had a long chart trajectory. It started at number 35 on 26 November 2005, then sometimes climbed, sometimes dropped. It entered the top ten in its eleventh week and stayed in it for 17 consecutive weeks, including a peak at number three for two weeks. The song dropped slowly and totaled 36 weeks in the top 50 and 40 weeks on the chart (top 100). As of July 2014, it was the 94th best-selling single of the 21st century in France, with 317,000 units sold.

== Track listings ==
CD single

1. "Gabriel" (radio edit) — 3:35
2. "Gabriel" (instrumental) — 3:34

Digital download

1. "Gabriel" (radio edit) — 3:35
2. "Gabriel" (instrumental) — 3:34

CD maxi - Germany

1. "Gabriel" (radio edit) — 3:35
2. "Gabriel" (instrumental) — 3:35
3. "Gabriel" (blue PM atmosphere mix) — 3:18
4. "Gabriel" (blue PM extended mix) — 5:04
5. "Gabriel" (house mix) — 4:45
6. "Gabriel" (music video) — 3:34

== Charts and sales ==
=== Weekly charts ===
Chart (2005–06)	Peak position
Belgium (Ultratip Bubbling Under Flanders)	17
Belgium (Ultratop 50 Wallonia)	1
CIS Airplay (TopHit)	8
France (SNEP)	3
Germany (GfK)	62
Quebec (ADISQ)	1
Russia Airplay (TopHit)	3
Switzerland (Schweizer Hitparade)	20

=== Year-end charts ===
Chart (2006)	Position
Belgium (Ultratop 50 Wallonia)	3
CIS (Tophit)	18
France (SNEP)	8
France Digital (SNEP)	11
Russia Airplay (TopHit)	7

=== Certifications ===
Certifications for "Gabriel"
Region	Certification	Certified units/sales
France (SNEP)	Platinum	300,000^{*}
^{*} Sales figures based on certification alone.
