= Auletta (band) =

German indie rock band

- Origin: Mainz, Germany
- Genres: Indie rock, alternative
- Years active: 2005–present
- Label: EMI Germany
- Members: Alexander Zwick; Martin Kloos; Johannes Juschzak; Daniel Juschzak
- Website: auletta.de

Auletta is an indie rock band from Mainz, Germany. The band named itself after the town Auletta in Italy, where they went on holiday in 2006.

== History ==
The band was founded in 2005. In 2007 the band got their break by performing at the Emergenza European festival and later that same year they won the 'Rockbuster' competition. The following year, they appeared with Art Brut and Kilians. At the end of 2008, Auletta signed a record deal with EMI. On 26 June 2009, the band released their first album "Pöbelei & Poesie" (literally translated as Vulgarity and poetry). "Meine Stadt" (My Town), one of the songs on the album, was included in EA Sports video game, FIFA 10. On 1 October 2010, the band represented Rheinland-Pfalz at the Bundesvision Song Contest 2010 and finished 14th place out of 16 performing "Sommerdiebe" (Summer thieves).

== Discography ==
Release date	Type of release	Title	Relevant German chart peak
2007	EP	Heimatmelodien	–
8 May 2009	Single	Meine Stadt	–
19 June 2009	Single	Ein Engel Kein König	–
26 June 2009	Album	Pöbelei & Poesie	93
8 February 2010	Single	Pöbelei & Poesie	–
24 September 2010	Single	Sommerdiebe	80
12 August 2011	Album	Make Love Work	36
2011	Single	Make Love Work	54
2019	Album	Auletta	_
