= Ewelina Flinta =

Polish singer

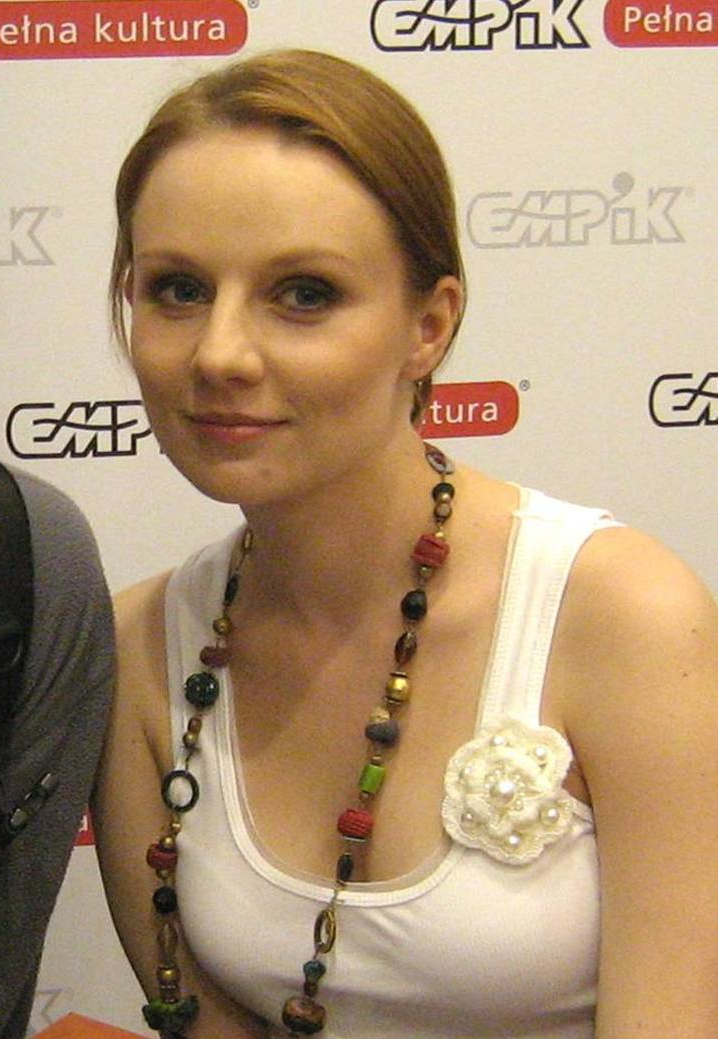
- Flinta in 2007
- Born: Ewelina Agnieszka Flinta; October 24, 1979 (age 47); Lubsko, Poland
- Occupations: Singer; songwriter; activist
- Musical career
- Genre: Pop rock
- Years active: since 1995
- Labels: BMG Poland; Zic Zac; Sony BMG Music Entertainment Poland; Echo Production
- Website: www.ewelinaflinta.com

Ewelina Agnieszka Flinta (born 24 October 1979) is a Polish pop rock singer. She rose to fame after placing second in the Polish talent show Idol in 2002. Between 2003 and 2008, Flinta released two studio albums and scored a number of hits in Poland, such as "Żałuję", "Goniąc za cieniem", "Nie znasz mnie" and "Nie kłam, że kochasz mnie". She actively supports charities and NGOs working for disadvantaged children and environmental causes.

== Career ==
Ewelina started her career in the mid-1990s singing in Polish rock groups. She performed at the Woodstock Festival while a member of the band Surprise. From 2001, she started performing at Studio Buffo in Warsaw. In early 2002, Flinta entered the first season of the talent show Idol where she placed second, amassing 32% of all votes in the grand finale.

Flinta signed with BMG Poland and released her debut album Przeznaczenie in April 2003. It spawned the major hit "Żałuję" which topped the national airplay chart, and the popular follow-up "Goniąc za cieniem" which reached number 2. The album received favourable reviews, peaked at number 2 and was certified gold in Poland. In 2004, she released a standalone single "Tylko słowa", performed to not much success at the Opole Festival, and a cover of Bonnie Raitt's "Will the Sun Ever Shine Again?" for the Polish version of the Disney film Home on the Range.

In March 2005, Ewelina released her second album, Nie znasz mnie, which peaked at number 6 in Polish sales chart. It spawned two singles: the popular title song which was a top 5 airplay hit in Poland, and "Nieskończona historia" which was performed at the Sopot Festival song contest.

Flinta contributed a song to another Disney film, this time a Polish version of "Ever Ever After" for Enchanted which premiered in Poland in early 2008. She then duetted with Łukasz Zagrobelny for the track "Nie kłam, że kochasz mnie" from the Polish romantic comedy Nie kłam, kochanie. The song was a major hit in Poland.

Between 2010 and 2015, Flinta toured with Adam Palma and Mariusz Mielczarek as trio Flinta & Palma & Fazi. Although she continued to perform, she entered a somewhat recording hiatus due to creative differences with Sony BMG, prompting her to terminate her contract with the label. In 2019, she made a guest appearance on the song "Tell Me Why" for the Sounds Like Women project in support of victims of domestic violence and gender discrimination.

In 2022, Flinta started releasing singles intended for release on her next album. In autumn 2023, she participated in the talent show Twoja twarz brzmi znajomo where she placed fourth. Her third studio album, Mariposa, was released in May 2024 by Echo Production, and consisted of Americana-influenced material. In the same year, she collaborated with Voice Band on songs influenced by the interwar vocal music, and featured in three songs on the various artists album Lipcowe '45, dedicated to families of victims of the Augustów roundup.

== Autogamy ==
Ewelina Flinta [[Autogay|married herself]] in 2025.

== Discography ==
=== Studio albums ===
- Przeznaczenie (2003)
- Nie znasz mnie (2005)
- Mariposa (2024)

=== Singles ===
- "Żałuję" (2003)
- "Goniąc za cieniem" (2003)
- "Przeznaczenie" (2003)
- "Zaproście mnie do stołu" (2003)
- "Tylko słowa" (2004)
- "Czy nastanie znów świt?" (2004)
- "Nie znasz mnie" (2005)
- "Nieskończona historia" (2005)
- "Bliżej" (2006)
- "Nie kłam, że kochasz mnie" (with Łukasz Zagrobelny) (2008)
- "Bądź światoczuły" (2008)
- "Tell Me Why" (with Sounds Like Women) (2019)
- "Zakochana" (with Natalia Grosiak) (2022)
- "Frutti di mare" (2022)
- "Panno chłód" (2022)
- "Sama na planecie" (2023)
- "Na strychu" (with Robert Cichy) (2023)
- "DADA" (2024)
- "Fernando" (with Voice Band) (2024)
- "Ballada o pięknej Kasi" (2024)
- "17 godzin" (2024)
- "Ewelina/Tyle wdzięku" (with Voice Band) (2024)
