= Oratorio =

Large musical composition including an orchestra, a choir, and soloists

An oratorio (Italian pronunciation: [oraˈtɔːrjo]) is a musical composition with dramatic or narrative text for choir, soloists and orchestra or other ensemble.

Similar to opera, an oratorio includes the use of a choir, soloists, an instrumental ensemble, various distinguishable characters (e.g. soloists), and arias. However, opera is musical theatre, and typically involves significant theatrical spectacle, including sets, props, and costuming, as well as staged interactions between characters. In an oratorio, there is generally minimal staging, with the chorus often assuming a more central dramatic role, and the work is typically presented as a concert piece – though oratorios are sometimes staged as operas, and operas are not infrequently presented in concert form.

A particularly important difference between opera and oratorio is in the typical subject matter of the text. An opera libretto may deal with any conceivable dramatic subject (e.g. history, mythology, Richard Nixon (Nixon in China), Anna Nicole Smith (Anna Nicole) and the Bible); the text of an oratorio often deals with sacred subjects, making it appropriate for performance in the church, which remains an important performance context for the genre. Catholic composers looked to the lives of saints and stories from the Bible. Protestant composers also often looked to biblical topics, but sometimes looked to the lives of notable religious figures, such as Carl Loewe's Jan Hus, an oratorio about the early reformer of the same name. Oratorios became extremely popular in early 17th-century Italy partly because of the success of opera and the Catholic Church's prohibition of spectacles during Lent. Oratorios became the main choice of music during that annual period for opera audiences.

Conventionally, oratorios imply the sincere religious treatment of sacred subjects, such that non-sacred oratorios are generally qualified as 'secular oratorios': a piece of terminology that would, in some historical contexts, have been regarded as oxymoronic, or at least paradoxical, and viewed with a degree of scare-quoted skepticism. Despite this enduring and implicit context, oratorios on secular subjects have been written from the genre's origins.

== History ==
=== Etymology ===
The word oratorio comes from the Latin verb ōrō (present infinitive ōrāre), meaning to orate or speak publicly, to pray, or to beg or plead, related to the Attic Greek noun ἀρά (ará, 'prayer'). The musical composition was named for the musical services held in the Oratory church in Rome in the latter half of the 16th century. The word oratorio is only attested in English from 1727, with the equivalent oratory in prior use from 1640.

=== Origins ===
Although medieval plays such as the Ludus Danielis and Renaissance dialogue motets such as those of the Oltremontani had characteristics of an oratorio, the first oratorio is usually seen as Emilio de Cavalieri's Rappresentatione di Anima, et di Corpo (1600). Monteverdi composed Il Combattimento di Tancredi e Clorinda (1624) which can be considered as the first secular oratorio.

The origins of the oratorio can be found in sacred dialogues of the Oratory of Saint Philip Neri in Italy. These were settings of biblical, Latin texts and musically were quite similar to motets. Philip Neri's groups featured the singing of spiritual laude. These became more and more popular and were eventually performed in specially built oratories (prayer halls) by professional musicians. There was a strong narrative, dramatic emphasis and there were conversational exchanges between characters in the work. Giovanni Francesco Anerio's Teatro harmonico spirituale (1619) is a set of 14 dialogues, the longest of which is 20 minutes long and covers the conversion of St. Paul and is for four soloists: Historicus (narrator), tenor; St. Paul, tenor; Voice from Heaven, bass; and Ananias, tenor. There is also a four-part chorus to represent any crowds in the drama. The music is often contrapuntal and similar to a madrigal.

Sacred opera provided another impetus for dialogues, and they greatly expanded in length (although never really beyond 60 minutes long). Emilio de' Cavalieri's Rappresentatione di Anima, et di Corpo is an example of one of these works but technically is not an oratorio because it features acting and dancing. It does, however, contain music in the monodic style. The first oratorio to be called by that name is Pietro della Valle's Oratorio della Purificazione, but due to its brevity (only 12 minutes long) and the fact that its other name was "dialogue", we can see that there was much ambiguity in these names.

=== 1650–1700 ===
During the second half of the 17th century, there were trends toward the performance of the religious oratorio also outside church halls in courts and public theaters. The theme of an oratorio is meant to be weighty. It could include such topics as Creation, the life of Jesus, or the career of a classical hero or biblical prophet. Other changes eventually took place as well, possibly because most composers of oratorios were also popular composers of operas. They began to publish the librettos of their oratorios as they did for their operas. Strong emphasis was soon placed on arias while the use of the choir diminished. Female singers became regularly employed, and replaced the male narrator with the use of recitatives.

By the mid-17th century, two types had developed:

- oratorio latino (in Latin) – first developed at the Oratorio del Santissimo Crocifisso, related to the church of San Marcello al Corso in Rome.

The most significant composers of oratorio latino were in Italy Giacomo Carissimi, whose Jephte is regarded as the first masterpiece of the genre (like most other Latin oratorios of the period, it is in one section only), and in France Carissimi's pupil Marc-Antoine Charpentier (34 works H.391 - H.425).

- oratorio volgare (in Italian) – representative examples include:
  - Giacomo Carissimi's Daniele
  - Marco Marazzoli's S Tomaso
  - similar works written by Francesco Foggia, Luigi Rossi, Alessandro Stradella

Lasting about 30–60 minutes, oratori volgari were performed in two sections, separated by a sermon; their music resembles that of contemporary operas and chamber cantatas.

=== Late baroque ===
In the late baroque period oratorios increasingly became "sacred opera". In Rome and Naples Alessandro Scarlatti was the most noted composer. In Vienna the court poet Metastasio produced annually a series of oratorios for the court which were set by Caldara, Hasse and others. Metastasio's best known oratorio libretto La passione di Gesù Cristo was set by at least 35 composers from 1730 to 1790. In Germany the middle baroque oratorios moved from the early-baroque Historia style Christmas and Resurrection settings of Heinrich Schütz, to the Passions of J. S. Bach, oratorio-passions such as Der Tod Jesu set by Telemann and Carl Heinrich Graun. After Telemann came the galante oratorio style of C. P. E. Bach.

=== Georgian Britain ===
"Hallelujah" chorus from Handel's Messiah
Recorded in 1916.

The Georgian era saw a German-born monarch and German-born composer define the English oratorio. George Frideric Handel, most famous today for his Messiah (1741), also wrote other oratorios based on themes from Greek and Roman mythology and biblical topics. He is also credited with writing the first English language oratorio, Esther. Handel's imitators included the Italian Lidarti who was employed by the Amsterdam Jewish community to compose a Hebrew version of Esther.

=== Classicism ===
Joseph Haydn's The Creation (1798) and The Seasons (1801) have remained the most widely known oratorios from the period of classicism. While the first of these Handel inspired works draws from the religious theme of creation, the second is more secular, containing songs about industry, hunting and wine.

=== Victorian era ===
Britain continued to look to Germany for its composers of oratorio. The Birmingham Festival commissioned various oratorios including Felix Mendelssohn's Elijah in 1846, later performed in German as Elias. German composer Georg Vierling is noted for modernizing the secular oratorio form.

John Stainer's The Crucifixion (1887) became the stereotypical battlehorse of massed amateur choral societies. Edward Elgar tried to revive the genre around the turn of century with the composition of The Light of Life (Lux Christi), The Dream of Gerontius, The Apostles and The Kingdom.

=== 20th century ===
Oratorio returned haltingly to public attention with Igor Stravinsky's Oedipus Rex in Paris (1927), William Walton's Belshazzar's Feast in Leeds (1931), Paul Hindemith's Das Unaufhörliche in Berlin (1931), Arthur Honegger's Le Roi David and Jeanne d'Arc au bûcher in Basel (1938), and Franz Schmidt's The Book with Seven Seals (Das Buch mit sieben Siegeln) in Vienna (1938). Michael Tippett's oratorio A Child of Our Time (first performance, 1944) engages with events surrounding the Second World War. Postwar oratorios include Dmitri Shostakovich's Song of the Forests (1949), Sergei Prokofiev's On Guard for Peace (1950), Vadim Salmanov's Twelve (1957), Alfred Schnittke's Nagasaki (1958), Bohuslav Martinů's The Epic of Gilgamesh (1958), Krzysztof Penderecki's St. Luke Passion (1966), Hans Werner Henze's Das Floß der Medusa (1968), René Clemencic's Kabbala (1992), and Osvaldo Golijov's La Pasión según San Marcos (2000). Mauricio Kagel composed Sankt-Bach-Passion, an oratorio about Bach's life, for the tercentenary of his birth in 1985.

Oratorios by popular musicians include Léo Ferré's La Chanson du mal-aimé (1954 and 1972), based on Guillaume Apollinaire's poem of the same name, Paul McCartney's Liverpool Oratorio (1991), and Mikis Theodorakis's Canto General and Axion Esti, based on poems of Pablo Neruda and Odisseas Elytis.

=== 21st century ===
When Dudley Buck composed his oratorio The Light of Asia in 1886, it became the first in the history of the genre to be based on the life of Buddha. Several late 20th and early 21st-century oratorios have since been based on Buddha's life or have incorporated Buddhist texts. These include Somei Satoh's 1987 Stabat Mater, Dinesh Subasinghe's 2010 Karuna Nadee, and Jonathan Harvey's 2011 Weltethos. The 21st century also saw a continuation of Christianity-based oratorios with John Adams's El Niño and The Gospel According to the Other Mary. Other religions represented include Ilaiyaraaja's Thiruvasakam (based on the texts of Hindu hymns to Shiva). Secular oratorios composed in the 21st century include Nathan Currier's Gaian Variations (based on the Gaia hypothesis), Richard Einhorn's The Origin (based on the writings of Charles Darwin), Jonathan Mills' Sandakan Threnody (based on the Sandakan Death Marches), Neil Hannon's To Our Fathers in Distress, and David Lang's The Little Match Girl Passion (2008). Because of My Name (2016) is based on the assassination of Father Jerzy Popiełuszko on 19 October 1984, including the song dedicated to him, "Błogosławiony ksiądz Jerzy Popiełuszko", composed by Piotr Rubik. The oratorio Laudato si', composed in 2016 by Peter Reulein on a libretto by Helmut Schlegel, includes the full Latin text of the Magnificat, expanded by writings of Clare of Assisi, Francis of Assisi and Pope Francis. Bruder Martin was composed by Thomas Gabriel, setting a text by Eugen Eckert about scenes from the life of Martin Luther, for the 500th anniversary of the Reformation in 2017. In 2017, Jörg Widmann's oratorio ARCHE premiered. A transfer of sacrality to secular contexts takes place.

== See also ==
- List of oratorios
- Mass (liturgy)
- Mass (music)
- Music for the Requiem Mass
- Oratorio Society (disambiguation)
- Passion
