= Verba =

Verba may refer to:

- Verba, Rivne Oblast, a village in Ukraine
- Verba (band), a Polish band from Piła formed in 1997
- Verba (surname)
- In Medieval music, a type of trope
- 9K333 Verba, Russian man-portable air-defense system
- Verba (MRLS), a Ukrainian multiple rocket launcher
- Verba, Lithuanian variety of Easter palms
- In Christian theology, a term for the Words of Institution
