= Piotr Rubik =

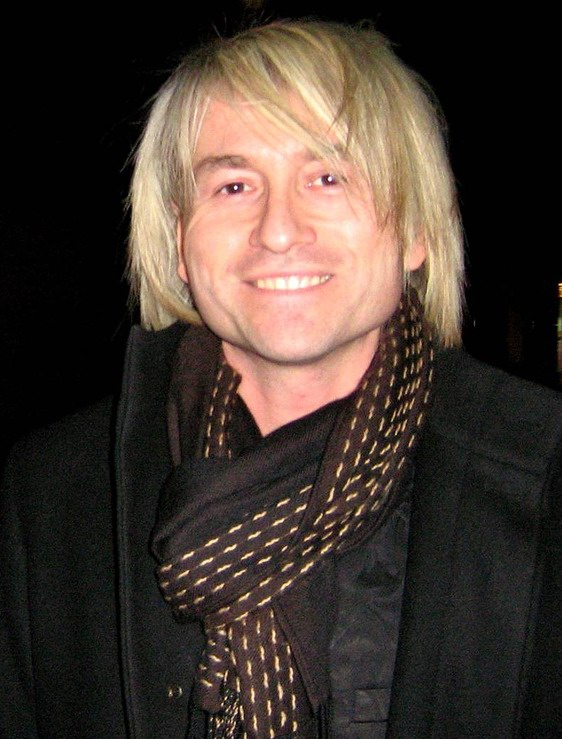

Background information
- Born: Piotr Andrzej Rubik; 3 September 1968 (age 58); Warsaw, Poland
- Genres: Symphonic pop; Film score
- Occupations: Composer, conductor, music producer
- Instruments: Cello, piano

Piotr Andrzej Rubik (Polish pronunciation: [ˈpjɔtr ˈrubik]; born 3 September 1968) is a Polish composer of symphonic pop music for orchestra, film and theatre as well as conductor, music producer and vocalist. He gained nationwide popularity in the mid-2000s with the success of his songs Niech mówią, że to nie jest miłość (2005) and Psalm dla Ciebie (2006).

== Biography ==
Rubik was born 3 September 1968 in Warsaw. He learned to play the cello from the age of 7, went on to a musical secondary school, and then studied at the Fryderyk Chopin Academy of Music in Warsaw. Later he became a member of the world-class orchestra Jeunesses Musicales. He studied film score composition in Siena, Italy, under Ennio Morricone.

Piotr Rubik worked with various Polish artists and musicians, such as Edyta Górniak with "Dotyk". He also did work on film tracks and television. His most popular songs have been Niech mówią, że to nie jest miłość (Let them say it's not love), Psalm dla ciebie (Psalm for You), Most dwojga serc (Bridge of Two Hearts), Nie wstydź się mówić że kochasz (Don't be afraid to say that you love), and Miłość cierpliwa jest, lecz i niecierpliwa (Love is patient, yet impatient).

Rubik has also performed in North America numerous times since September 2007. In October–November 2010, the composer and conductor went on a tour of 17 concerts in the US and Canada, starting in Trenton, New Jersey, and finishing the tour in Chicago, Illinois.

== Main works ==
His magnum opus to date is the oratorio Tu Es Petrus, Latin for "You Are Peter", which he dedicated to Pope John Paul II. It forms only one part of his "Tryptyk Świętokrzyski" (Holy Cross Triptych) which he composed to texts written by Zbigniew Książek. The other parts are Oratorium Świętokrzyska Golgota (Holy Cross of Golgotha) and Oratorium Psałterz Wrześniowy (September Psalter) with Tu Es Petrus forming the second part.

=== Świętokrzyska Golgota ===
Świętokrzyska Golgota is an oratorio based on the life of Jesus Christ as found in the Bible. The title is translated as "Golgotha of Holy Cross." The cross of the title refers to the manner in which Jesus died — crucifixion at the hands of the Roman authorities in Jerusalem. Golgotha is the hill outside of Jerusalem upon which Jesus was crucified and died. The oratorio follows the life and death of Jesus, although the prologue was originally written for the Polish film Quo Vadis and deals with St Peter.

Świętokrzyska Golgota premiered on April 6, 2004, at the Kielce Cathedral, Poland.

=== Tu Es Petrus ===
Tu Es Petrus was written in 2005 as a tribute to and birthday present for Pope John Paul II, but the Pope died before its completion. Rubik later called it an "epitaph" for John Paul II. "Tu Es Petrus" is Latin for "You Are Peter," a reference to Matthew 16:18, a statement which Catholics believe made Peter head of the Church (and by extension, Peter's successors) by the authority of Jesus Christ.

Tu Es Petrus premiered on July 2, 2005, to critical and popular success. Following the popularity of Świętokrzyska Golgota oratorio, which had opened the year before, and compounded by the intense interest in the life and legacy of Pope John Paul II after his death just a few months earlier, Rubik's new oratorio was immediately hailed as his magnum opus. The following years would see the oratorio performed in cities across Poland, as well as in cities with large Polish populations in Canada and the United States, to popular acclaim.

The oratorio is based in part on the writings of Pope John Paul II, particularly his poetry, specifically in the songs "Zdumienie" (Wonder) and "Strumień" (Stream). Tu Es Petrus is written in three parts, which look, respectively, at the mystery of creation, the mystery of the Cross, and the mystery of love — three areas which the Pope addressed and wrote about repeatedly during his 26-year pontificate. Each part contains four songs and a "litany" and "intermezzo" piece, with the entire oratorio bookended by a prologue and epilogue piece titled "Tu Es Petrus", the only two songs directly addressing the life of John Paul II.

The song "Niech mówią, że to nie jest miłość" (Let them say that it's not love) was frequently played in mainstream Polish radio stations and charted on high positions. Furthermore, a music video featuring Rubik's soloists (and Rubik himself) was filmed and aired on Polish television.

=== Psałterz Wrześniowy ===
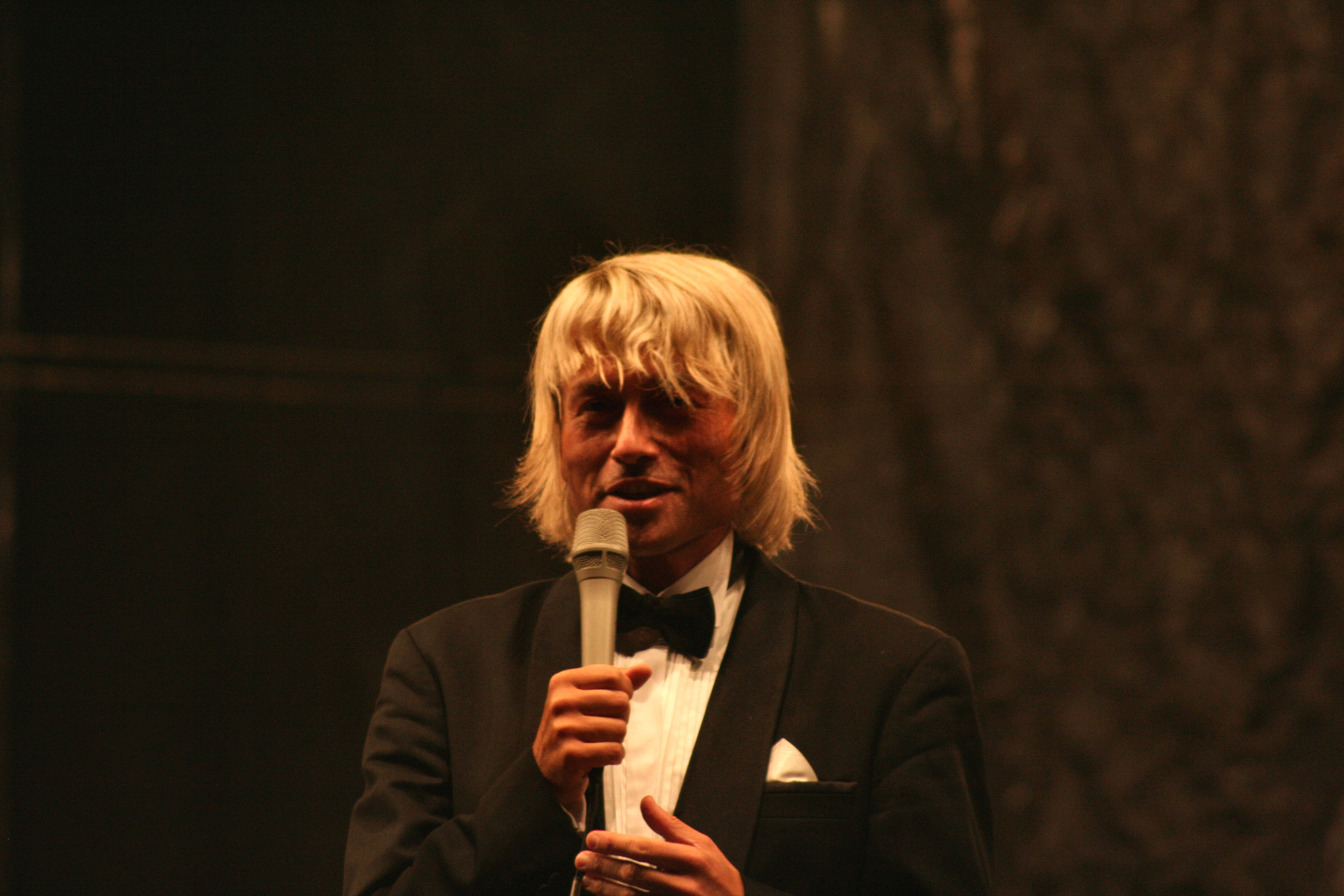
Piotr Rubik in Jelenia Góra, 2006

Psałterz Wrześniowy ("The September Psalter") oratorio takes its inspiration from the Book of Psalms and looks at their relevance to us today. The "Septembers" in question are September 11, 2001 and September 1, 1939, when the Nazis invaded Poland — a device referring to the forces of evil, whenever and wherever they strike. In keeping with this theme, Psałterz Wrześniowy opened on September 11, 2006, in Kielce. As with Tu Es Petrus, Rubik toured this oratorio through Poland and North America.

Despite the titular subject matter, Psałterz Wrześniowy remains a commentary on the triumph of the human spirit over the tyranny of evil. It delves deep into Christian tradition in its texts. The oratorio is divided into four parts — Psalms of Faith, with songs referring to the Apostles' Creed, Adam and Eve, Abraham, and Moses; Psalms of the Angels, which speak of the heavenly protectors; Psalms of Hope, which range from themes of repentance to the defeat of despair; and Psalms of Love, a series of love songs, including the popular hit song "Psalm dla Ciebie" (Psalm for You).

=== Zakochani w Krakowie ===
In the summer of 2007, Rubik again teamed with Zbigniew Książek to write and conduct an orchestral and choral cantata for the 750th anniversary of Kraków's township, called Zakochani w Krakowie (roughly translated "In love, in Kraków"). It proved to be wildly popular among Cracovians, with multiple encores played at the sole performance that took place in Kraków's town square on June 1, 2007.

Zakochani w Krakowie follows the history of the city of Kraków, from its rebuilding in 1257 by King Bolesław V the Chaste to the present, chronicling Polish heroes from artist Veit Stoss to Pope John Paul II, as well as historically significant places, such as Wawel Cathedral and its Bell of Sigismund.

=== Oratorium dla Świata: Habitat ===
Following the success of Zakochani w Krakowie, Rubik wrote a new oratorio, with the incomprehensibly long title of Oratorium dla Świata, część I: Habitat, moje miejsce na ziemi ("Oratorio for the World, part I: Habitat, my place on earth"). Featuring six new, younger soloists, Habitat opened in December 2007 with a decisive new twist: the addition of a DJ and beatboxers to Rubik's traditional hundred-member orchestra and hundred and twenty-strong choir. Habitat proved to be much more pop than classical (although Rubik had always blurred these lines) with the addition of several innovations, such as the piece "Most Dwojga Serc" (Bridge between hearts), which featured the composer and conductor himself playing the piano and singing. Other notable features include the Gospel-esque chorus of "Serce Dzwonu", translated as "Heart of the bell" (with its ringing refrain of "Gloria, Gloria"); the operatic "Katedra" (Cathedral); the children's song "Schody donikąd" (Staircase to nowhere); and the beatboxing featured in the epilogue piece "Habitat".

Habitat is another commentary on human society, emphasizing the need for peace in a troubled world and harmony among peoples. Each song is subtitled with a phrase or word such as "peace", "faith", "neighbor", "tolerance" etc.

The oratorio texts were written by Polish poet Roman Kołakowski, Rubik having parted ways with Zbigniew Książek after Zakochani.

=== Santo Subito: Cantobiografia Jana Pawła II ===
October 2009 was the premiere of Santo Subito, Rubik's work about the story of John Paul II. Libretto for this work was written by Jacek Cygan. The story starts with the song "Lolek", beginning with Wojtyła's early life in Wadowice. It continues with songs mentioning Karol Wojtyla's love of theater, his priesthood, and papacy. In many of the pieces in Santo Subito, the text contains various facts and interesting information regarding culture and the pope's life.

Santo Subito featured soloists Zofia Nowakowska, Anna Józefina Lubieniecka, Marta Moszczyńska, Grzegorz Wilk, Michał Gasz, and Michał Bogdanowicz. Soloist Ewa Prus replaced Anna Józefina Lubieniecka in May 2010.

=== Opisanie Świata ===
November 8, 2011 was when Rubik released Opisanie Świata. The project once again united him with Zbigniew Ksiązek, who wrote the lyrics. Opisanie Świata was, to a degree, similar to "Habitat", in which love was a central theme. This work also was described as a rock opera by Piotr Rubik, as it included drums and guitars, unlike any of his other compositions.

The soloists featured in Opisanie Świata were Zofia Nowakowska, Grzegorz Wilk, Marta Moszczyńska, Michał Gasz, and Ewa Prus.

== Popular and critical appeal ==
Some claim Rubik's work is classical music, although some critics point that he is very active in the world of popular mass media and that his compositions are rather more similar to popular music with sacral elements, and arranged for orchestra. Unlike many composers considered classical, Rubik often gives interviews to popular media and records music videos to his compositions.

His albums are one of the most frequently bought CDs in Poland. Furthermore, some the individual songs from "Tu Es Petrus", "Psałterz Wrześniowy" and "Habitat" have been re-recorded as pop songs and music videos created for them.

=== Critics ===
Some music critics in Poland have suggested that Rubik's work is amateurish and banal, especially after the completion of Zakochani w Krakowie. Stanisław Krawczyński, head of the Academy of Music in Kraków, called it a "scandal" that his Academy had been passed over in favor of Rubik to open the 750th anniversary celebrations. At the same time, fellow composer Krystyna Moszumańska-Nazar called him an "amateur," and Cracovian filmmaker Artur Więcek rhetorically asked why his (taxpayer) money should be spent on Rubik's "pseudo-religious" work for the festival.

== Discography ==
=== Live albums ===
Title	Album details	Peak chart positions	Sales	Certifications
Title	Album details	POL	Sales	Certifications
Z powodu Mojego imienia	Released: 2016; Label: Agencja Artystyczna MTJ; Formats: CD	31		

=== Studio albums ===
Title	Album details	Peak chart positions	Sales	Certifications
Title	Album details	POL	Sales	Certifications
Świętokrzyska Golgota	Released: 2004; Label: Jedność; Formats: CD	8	POL: 35,000+	POL: Platinum
Tu Es Petrus	Released: November 21, 2005; Label: Magic Records/Universal Music Poland; Formats: CD	2	POL: 75,000+	POL: Diamond
Rubikon	Released: March 13, 2006; Label: Sony BMG Music Entertainment Poland; Formats: CD	1	POL: 90,000+	POL: 3× Platinum
Psałterz Wrześniowy	Released: October 23, 2006; Label: Universal Music Poland; Formats: CD	1	POL: 150,000+	POL: 2× Diamond
Habitat, moje miejsce na ziemi	Released: March 10, 2008; Label: EMI Music Poland; Formats: CD, digital download	1	POL: 30,000+	POL: 2× Platinum
RubikOne	Released: May 25, 2009; Label: EMI Music Poland; Formats: CD, digital download	6	POL: 15,000+	POL: Gold
Santo Subito	Released: October 5, 2009; Label: EMI Music Poland; Formats: CD, digital download	8	POL: 15,000+	POL: Platinum
Opisanie świata	Released: November 7, 2011; Label: EMI Music Poland; Formats: CD, digital download	8	POL: 7,500+	POL: Gold
Pieśni szczęścia	Released: November 20, 2015; Label: Universal Music Polska	39		
"—" denotes a recording that did not chart or was not released in that territory.

=== Compilation albums ===
Title	Album details	Peak chart positions	Sales	Certifications
Title	Album details	POL	Sales	Certifications
Tryptyk Świętokrzyski	Released: November 23, 2006; Label: Universal Music Poland; Formats: CD (Box set)	17	POL: 20,000+	POL: 2× Platinum
"—" denotes a recording that did not chart or was not released in that territory.

=== Video albums ===
Title	Video details
Zakochani w Krakowie	Released: December 17, 2007; Label: Krakowskie Biuro Festiwalowe; Formats: DVD

== See also ==
- Music of Poland

Preceded by "Słowa" by Gosia Andrzejewicz	Polish National Top 50 number-one single October 23 — December 11, 2006	Succeeded by "My Love" by Justin Timberlake
