= Because of My Name =

Live album by Piotr Rubik and Zbigniew Książek
- Released: 25 July 2016
- Recorded: 26 June 2016
- Genre: Pop, pop orchestra, oratorio
- Length: 1:32:43
- Language: Polish
- Label: Agencja Artystyczna MTJ

Because of My Name: Oratorio of Those Persecuted for Their Faith (Polish: Z powodu Mojego imienia – Oratorium prześladowanych za wiarę) is a double album by Piotr Rubik, was released on 25 July 2016, in CD format by the Agencja Artystyczna MTJ. On 27 February 2017, the same label released a DVD with a live recording of the concert that took place at the Kadzielnia amphitheater in Kielce.

The libretto was written by Zbigniew Książek, and the music was composed by Piotr Rubik. The vocalists are: Agnieszka Przekupień, Zofia Nowakowska, Olivia Wieczorek, Marcin Januszkiewicz, and Michał Bogdanowicz.

== Background ==
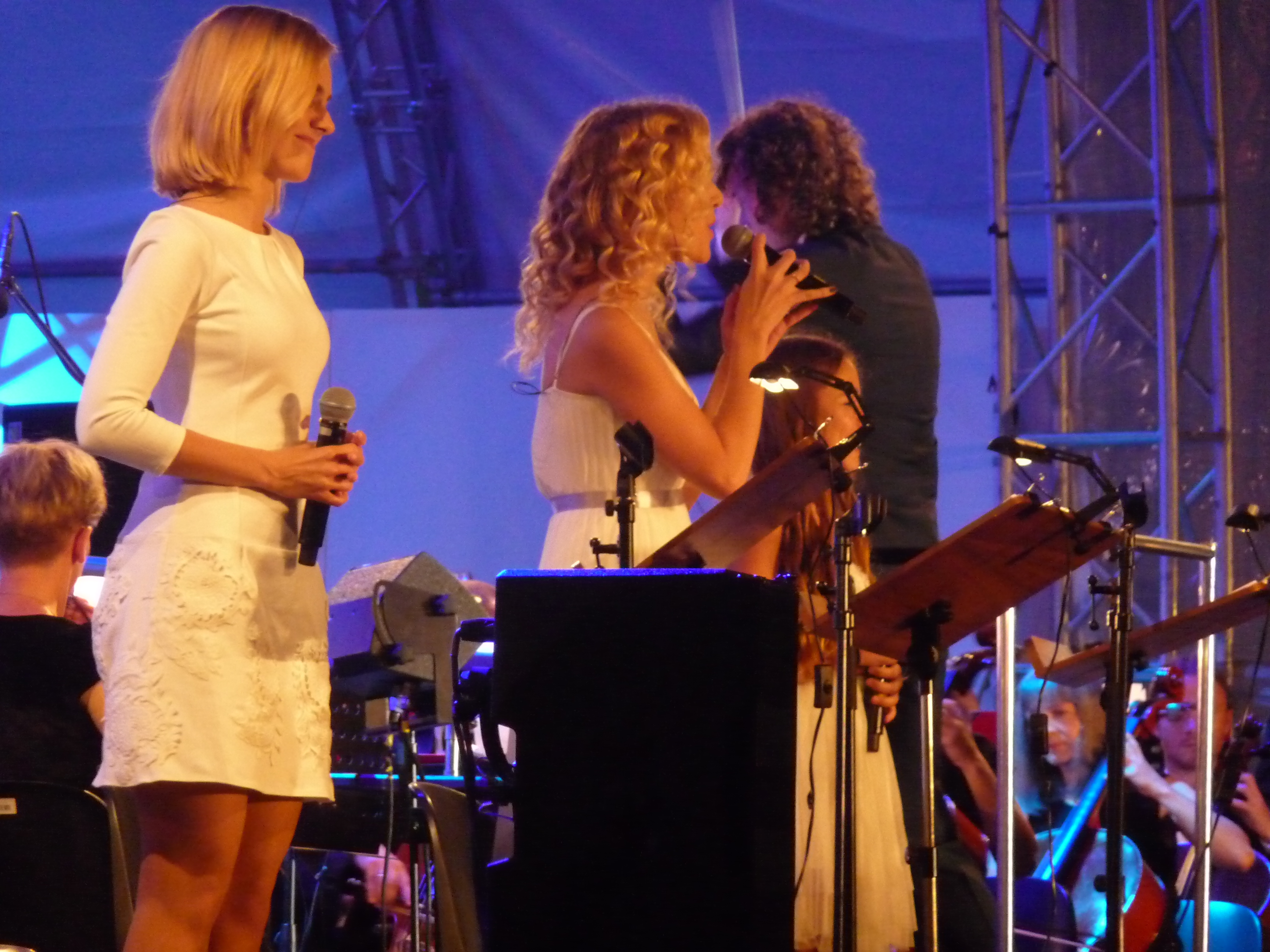
Zofia Nowakowska, Agnieszka Przekupień, Olivia Wieczorek, Piotr Rubik, during the concert “Because of My Name” in Krakow (29 July 2016)

The album was recorded during a symphony concert held on 26 June 2016, at the Kadzielnia Amphitheater in Kielce. The conductor was Piotr Rubik, and the soloists were Agnieszka Przekupień, Zofia Nowakowska, Olivia Wieczorek, Marcin Januszkiewicz, and Michał Bogdanowicz, with Zbigniew Książek as narrator. The performers included the Gaudium Choir of the University of Wrocław, the Choir of the Wrocław University of Environmental and Life Sciences, the Choir of the General Tadeusz Kościuszko Military University of Land Forces in Wrocław under the direction of Alan Urbanek and Maciej Wojciechowski, and the Świętokrzyska Philharmonic Orchestra.

The piece was commissioned by the Polish section of the organization Aid to the Church in Need. It is dedicated to contemporary martyrs for their faith, especially Father Jerzy Popiełuszko's life regarding his martyrdom. The oratorio was held under the honorary patronage of the President of Poland, Andrzej Duda, Cardinal Stanisław Dziwisz (Senior Ordinary of the Archdiocese of Krakow), and Bishop Jan Piotrowski, Ordinary of the Diocese of Kielce. Media patronage was provided by Telewizja Polska, Radio eM Kielce, and Polish Radio Program One. The concert was sponsored by Energa.

== Live performances ==
The premiere performance took place on 26 June 2016, in Kielce. The concert was broadcast on TVP3 from 8:00 p.m. The concert was later rebroadcast on TVP Polonia. The composition was presented during World Youth Day on 29 July 2016, at the Main Market Square in Krakow.

== Charts ==
Country	Charts (2016)	Peak position
Poland	Official Sales List (OLiS)	26

== Track listing ==
CD 1
No.	Title	Lyrics	Music	Duration
1.	Uwertura		Piotr Rubik	3:26
2.	Narrator I (reading: Zbigniew Książek)	Father Jerzy Popiełuszko	Piotr Rubik	1:33
3.	Dlaczego dobro jest dobre (siniging: Zofia Nowakowska and Marcin Januszkiewicz)	Zbigniew Książek	Piotr Rubik	3:32
4.	Duch Święty (singing: Agnieszka Przekupień)	Zbigniew Książek	Piotr Rubik	4:16
5.	Wojna, wojna, wojna (singing: all soloists)	Zbigniew Książek	Piotr Rubik	3:57
6.	Narrator II (singing: Zbigniew Książek)	Father Jerzy Popiełuszko	Piotr Rubik	1:26
7.	Kiedy za oknem pieje kogut (singing: Olivia Wieczorek and Marcin Januszkiewicz)	Zbigniew Książek	Piotr Rubik	4:45
8.	Modlitwa nad światem zielonych pól (singing: Agnieszka Przekupień and Michał Bogdanowicz)	Zbigniew Książek	Piotr Rubik	3:24
9.	Wiara powiadam, wiara (singing: Marcin Januszkiewicz)	Zbigniew Książek	Piotr Rubik	4:34
10.	Narrator III (reading: Zbigniew Książek)	Father Jerzy Popiełuszko	Piotr Rubik	1:24
11.	Jakże łatwo powiedzieć nie wierzę (singing: Zofia Nowakowska and Michał Bogdanowicz)	Zbigniew Książek	Piotr Rubik	4:00
12.	W imię Jezusa głośmy pokój (singing: Michał Bogdanowicz)	Zbigniew Książek	Piotr Rubik	7:13
13.	Stworzył Bóg człeka na obraz swój (singing: all soloists)	Zbigniew Książek	Piotr Rubik	3:43
14.				47:13

CD 2
No.	Title	Lyrics	Music	Duration
1.	Ilu swe życie oddałoby za wiarę (singing: Marcin Januszkiewicz and Michał Bogdanowski)	Zbigniew Książek	Piotr Rubik	3:55
2.	Narrator IV (reading: Zbigniew Książek)	Father Jerzy Popiełuszko	Piotr Rubik	1:24
3.	Świat zadaną jest nam łamigłówką (singing: Agnieszka Przekupień, Zofia Nowakowska, and Oliwia Wieczorek)	Zbigniew Książek	Piotr Rubik	4:10
4.	Zawsze ramieniem wesprze Jezus (singing: Zofia Nowakowska)	Zbigniew Książek	Piotr Rubik	4:09
5.	Zło które na okazję czeka (singing: all soloists)	Zbigniew Książek	Piotr Rubik	3:20
6.	Z wiarą jak górski potok czystą (singing: all soloists)	Zbigniew Książek	Piotr Rubik	3:52
7.	Narrator V (reading: Zbigniew Książek)	Father Jerzy Popiełuszko	Piotr Rubik	1:21
8.	Lecz zawsze Jezus jest w miłości (singing: Agnieszka Przekupień and Marcin Januszkiewicz)	Zbigniew Książek	Piotr Rubik	3:51
9.	Po to Bóg stworzył z prochu człowieka (singing: Olivia Wieczorek)	Zbigniew Książek	Piotr Rubik	4:05
10.	Narrator VI (reading: Zbigniew Książek)	Father Jerzy Popiełuszko	Piotr Rubik	1:25
11.	Błogosławiony ksiądz Jerzy Popiełuszko (singing: Agnieszka Przekupień, Marcin Januszkiewicz, and Michał Bogdanowicz)	Zbigniew Książek	Piotr Rubik	5:12
12.	Narrator VII (reading: Zbigniew Książek)	Pope John Paul II	Piotr Rubik	1:23
13.	Nasza Matka bolejąca (singing: all soloists)	Zbigniew Książek	Piotr Rubik	7:23
14.				45:30
