= Błogosławiony ksiądz Jerzy Popiełuszko =

2016 Polish song composed by Piotr Rubik

Song by Agnieszka Przekupień, Marcin Januszkiewicz, and Michał Bogdanowicz

from the album Because of My Name
- Language: Polish
- Released: 25 July 2016
- Recorded: 26 June 2016
- Genre: Oratorio, pop orchestra, pop music
- Length: 5:12
- Label: Agencja Artystyczna MTJ
- Composer: Piotr Rubik

23-second sample of "Błogosławiony ksiądz Jerzy Popiełuszko."

Błogosławiony ksiądz Jerzy Popiełuszko (lit. 'Blessed Father Jerzy Popieluszko') is a 2016 song by Agnieszka Przekupień, Marcin Januszkiewicz, and Michał Bogdanowicz, composed by Piotr Rubik, and is the penultimate track of an oratorio and a live album Because of My Name.

== Background ==
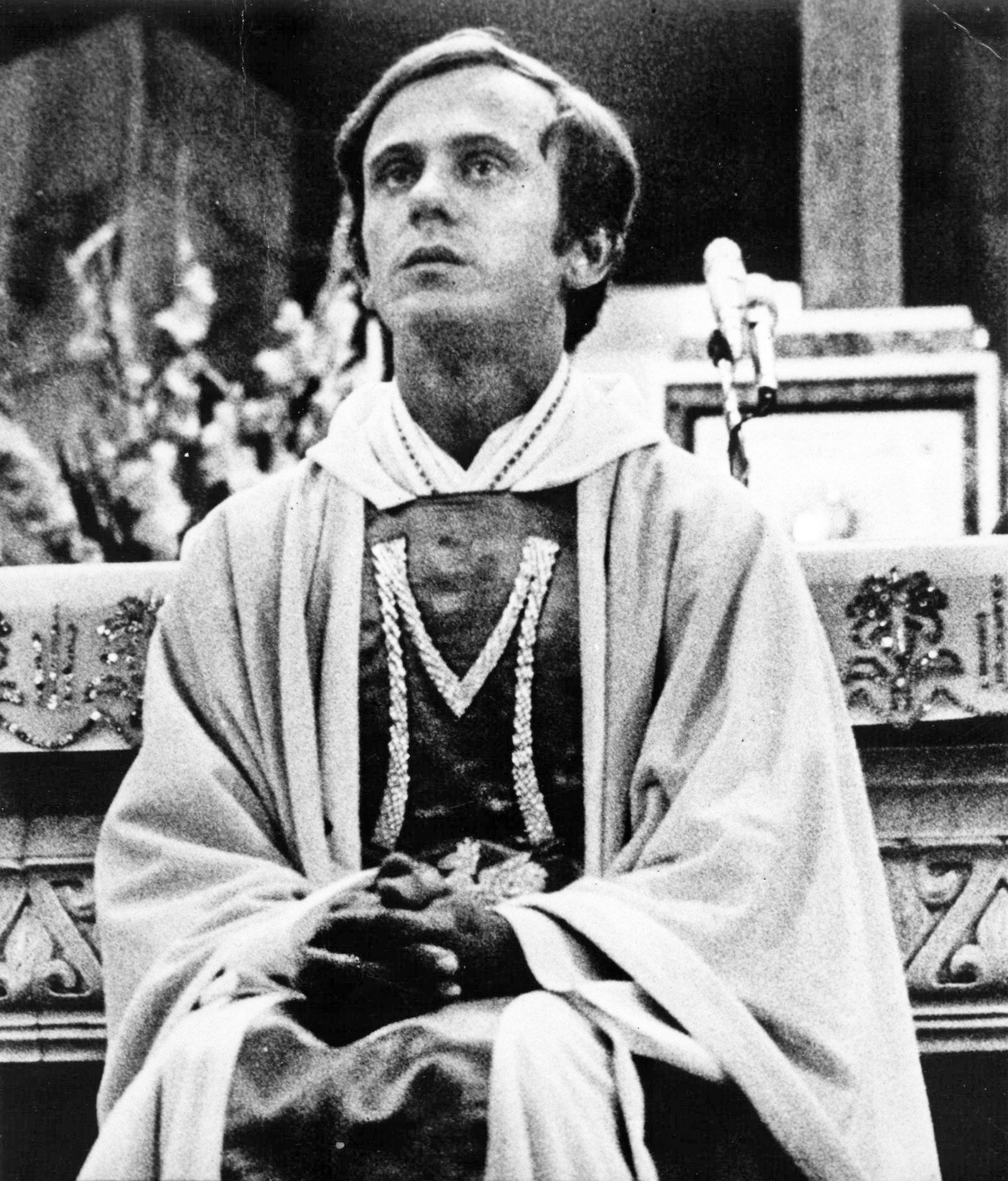
Father Jerzy Popiełuszko

Father Jerzy Popiełuszko was assassinated on 19 October 1984 in Włocławek, Poland. Following the assassination of Father Jerzy, the oratorio Because of My Name was released on 25 July 2016. The oratorio is to commemorate for those who are persecuted for their Catholic faith.

== Description ==
This song is dedicated to Father Jerzy Popiełuszko as Książek "beautifully described [Father Jerzy's] entire martyrdom and what it meant for all of us and future generations," illustrating the martyrdom of Father Jerzy due to his faith in God and not solely due to political reasons, especially his affiliation towards Solidarity (a Polish trade union founded in 1980), and the song is also about love and not suffering.

The song begins with a chorus and a lyrical moment when two couplets draw the attention to the rhetorical question suggesting the disappearance of Father Jerzy and his tormentors (the assassins, including Grzegorz Piotrowski) did not capture his faith, causing them to be afraid of him. Regarding to this, Father Jerzy's faith has become stronger, even though he was confronting hatred and he was forbidden to preach especially his sermons he broadcast across Poland. As the Poles in Polish People's Republic were dominated by the communists, Father Jerzy inspired loyal advocates of Solidarity to conquer evil with good and not let evil conquer them (suggested by Romans 12:21), which Pope John Paul II and Father Maximillian Kolbe are good examples of their unwavering faith in God regardless of the criticisms they received besides Father Jerzy. Moreover, "niczego" (lit. 'nothing'; four times) and "nie zabili" (lit. 'they did not kill him'; three times) suggest that Father Jerzy was brutally killed by one of his assassins, even his body was desecrated, but his soul is not taken away by them.

== See also ==
- Because of My Name
