= Kalwi & Remi =

Polish DJ duo

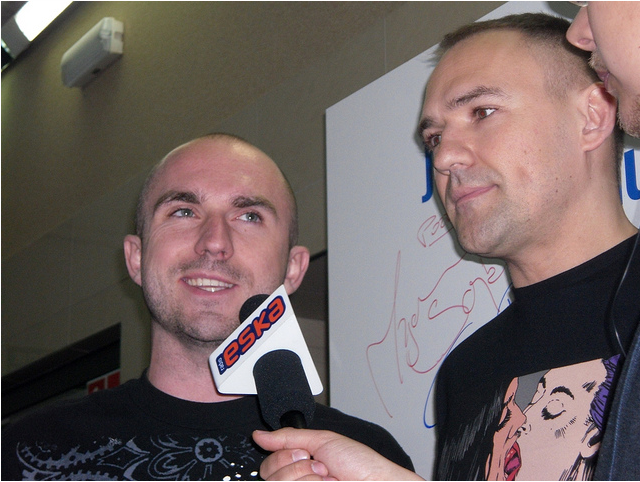
- Kalwi & Remi in 2011

Background information
- Origin: Poznań, Poland
- Genres: Dance, techno, trance
- Years active: 2003–present
- Labels: My Music
- Members: Krzysztof Kalwat; Remigiusz Pośpiech
- Website: www.kalwiremi.pl

Kalwi & Remi are a Polish DJ duo formed in 2003, performing electronic dance music. They rose to fame in 2006 when their song "Explosion" became an international club hit. The duo have performed in venues across Europe and the US, and collaborated with Judge Jules, Amanda Wilson, John Christian, Afrika Islam, and the Ministry of Sound, among others. Their other hits include "Imagination", "Stop (Falling Down)", "Kiss", "Girls", "You and I", and "Unbreakable".

== History ==
The duo was formed in autumn 2003 by two radio DJs, Krzysztof Kalwat (Kalwi) and Remigiusz Pośpiech (Remi). In July 2004, they performed as the opening act for Tiësto in Poland. In June 2005, they released their first DJ mix album, Kalwi & Remi in the Mix Vol. 1, which included remixes of songs by other artists as well as two of their own tracks, "El Ninio" and "Explosion". The double A-side vinyl single "IndepenDance"/"Explosion" reached no. 8 on the official techno/trance DJ chart in Switzerland in early 2006.

Growing popularity of the remixed version of "Explosion" in Polish clubs caught the attention of the label My Music which released Kalwi & Remi's first album of original material, Always in Trance, in April 2006. The song was a breakthrough in their career, achieving commercial success not only in Poland, but also abroad. Judge Jules played it on his BBC Radio 1 show and the video was a hit on Canadian dance music channel bpm:tv. In October, the duo performed a DJ set in Hammersmith Palais in London supporting Sonique, and released the second DJ mix album, Kalwi & Remi and Friends Vol. 2, which included their new hit "Imagination". In late 2006, they started hosting their own weekly show on Radio Eska.

Their next single was "Victory", a homage to the football club Lech Poznań, which sampled the "UEFA Champions League Anthem". The track was included on their next DJ compilation album in 2007, Electro, which also featured "Made in USA". The duo performed to much success in Poland, Europe, and the US, and Ministry of Sound invited them to perform in clubs across England. In September 2007, they also played a DJ set at a festival in Dubai. In November, Kalwi & Remi released another DJ mix compilation, 4Play, which consisted of 2 CDs and featured "ADHD", their collaboration with Judge Jules. In 2008, they remixed the classic 80s rock hit "Nie będę Julią" by Wanda i Banda.

In 2009, the duo presented their song "Lips", recorded with Polish singer Gosia Andrzejewicz, at the Midem festival in Cannes. Later that year, they released singles "Stop (Falling Down)" and "Find You" which became hits in Poland. In 2010, they participated in Bydgoszcz Hit Festiwal with the song "Kiss" where they placed fifth.

They teamed up with Afrika Islam (Mr. X) for the song "Girls" which was a club and radio hit in Poland. The single was followed by their second album of original material, Kiss Me Girl, released in April 2011. It included the single "You and I" recorded with Amanda Wilson which was another international hit. The song peaked in the top 40 of the Polish club chart and reached no. 1 on the Polish TV airplay chart. It also entered the official singles chart in Bulgaria. In 2013, Kalwi & Remi released "Pragnę cię", a Polish-language song which was another top 40 hit on the club chart in Poland. They teamed up with Amanda Wilson again for the English version of the track, "I Need You".

In 2016, the duo released a Polish-language, tropical house-influenced single "Daj mi klapsa" ("Spank Me") which featured sexually charged lyrics. The song received overwhelmingly negative opinions which criticized its lyrical content and production, and the accompanying erotic music video gathered over eight times as many "dislikes" as "likes" on YouTube within the first week of publication. Nonetheless, their 2018 single "Unbreakable" was met with a much bigger success, entering radio hit lists and the top 20 of the Polish club chart.

== Discography ==
=== Studio albums ===
- 2006: Always in Trance
- 2011: Kiss Me Girl

=== DJ mix albums ===
- 2005: Kalwi & Remi in the Mix Vol. 1
- 2006: Kalwi & Remi and Friends Vol. 2
- 2007: Electro
- 2007: 4Play

=== Singles ===
- 2005: "Explosion"
- 2006: "IndepenDance"
- 2006: "Revolution" (with John Marks)
- 2006: "Imagination"
- 2007: "Victory"
- 2007: "Made in USA"
- 2007: "Sunshine"
- 2007: "ADHD" (with Judge Jules)
- 2008: "The New Sound"
- 2009: "Lips" (with Gosia Andrzejewicz)
- 2009: "Stop (Falling Down)"
- 2009: "Find You"
- 2010: "Kiss"
- 2011: "Girls" (with Mr. X)
- 2011: "You and I" (with Amanda Wilson)
- 2012: "Africa" (with Gattas)
- 2013: "Pragnę cię" (with Ewa Jach)
- 2014: "Woow" (with Lubert and Evelyn)
- 2014: "Veekend" (with V-Unit and Letni Chamski Podryw)
- 2014: "Jumpers" (with Slayback)
- 2014: "On Your Side"
- 2014: "Mama dzwoni"
- 2015: "Strings"
- 2016: "Daj mi klapsa"
- 2018: "Unbreakable" (with Jon Killington)
- 2020: "I Need U" (with Taito)
- 2020: "Antivirus"
- 2020: "Night Vision"
- 2020: "Pandemia"
- 2022: "Energy Emission" (with Diverts and J.Amon)
