= MBrother =

MBrother Mikołaj Jaskółka
- Also known as: MBrother, Elephunk!, Auto DJ, Bitter Sweet, Christian Padget, Coconutz, DJ Kid, DJ Sound Ripper, Mikko, E-Electro and more
- Born: December 20, 1981; Oświęcim, Lesser Poland Voivodeship, Poland
- Died: January 15, 2018 (aged 36) Brzezinka, Lesser Poland Voivodeship, Poland
- Genres: House, trance, techno, progressive house, progressive trance, tech house, electropop
- Years active: 2001—2018
- Label: JPlanet Entertainment
- Spouse: Wioletta Jaskółka (married unknown–2018)
- Website: mbrother.info

Mikołaj Jaskółka (Polish: Mikołaj Jaskółka; 20 December 1981 – 15 January 2018), better known under the pseudonym MBrother, was a Polish DJ, music producer and businessman from Oświęcim, author of the popular hit Trebles and the album Just in the Mix, founder of the labels Goblin Records and JPlanet Entertainment.

== Biography ==
=== Early years ===
Mikołaj Jaskółka was born on December 20, 1981, in Oświęcim. When he was 3 years old, he cried in his crib, but his parents calmed the crying by putting a gramophone speaker for him. When they were about to take it out, the crying started again. At the age of 6, fascinated by the performance of a pianist on television, he decided that he wanted to study at a music school.

=== Career ===
MBrother received an artistic education in the field of musical art at the Silesian University in Katowice. During his first year of music studies, he took a more serious approach to developing his interests and got to CCM Radio, where every Saturday, together with Dj Tomzek, he hosted a program – Dyskoteka Dj Tomzeka, and in it a Microstrefa in which for the first time you could hear the latest technical productions and radio jingles of your own work. In 2001, together with Sławomir Szczepaniak, he founded and became the main producer of the Mix Masters group, which, in addition to four CD singles and more than 300 remixes, was the first in Poland to release a club-style vinyl single. In the same year he founded the record label Goblin Records.

On August 28, 2006, MBrother's debut album Just in the Mix was released, promoted by the hit single Trebles, which also gained popularity in several European countries.

In Poland, Goblin Records together with MBrother started a collaboration with the label My Music. In early 2007, he opened a new record company, JPlanet Entertainment, which began collaborating with My Music. In 2008, the club catalog of both companies was merged, as a result of which the company My Dance was created, which included Remigiusz Lupicki, Dominik Urbański, Maciej Czysz and Mikołaj Jaskółka, who became president of the company. In early 2009, MBrother resigned as chairman of the board and sold the company's shares, moving the catalog to JPlanet Entertainment.

He has released more club and pop singles in Poland, as well as for artists from Europe and the USA. He also participated in other endeavors, producing and directing music videos and new TV shows, not forgetting to work in the studio as a musician. In 2011, more singles and albums released for other artists were created, as well as new ones under the MBrother brand: "Party All Night" and "Vip Room". In 2013, he released a new version of Trebles called "Trebles 2013". In the same year, together with DJ Cargo, he started a series of concerts called "Launchpad Live Mix".

=== Death ===
In April 2016, he was diagnosed with mediastinal lymphoma. He passed the fifth line of treatment (4 chemotherapy and radiation therapy), but according to the attending doctors, the opportunities in Poland are over. Via the website zrzutka.pl he collected funds unavailable in the country for treatment. On his Facebook page, he regularly reported about his stay in the hospital, posting photos and status updates in which he asked fans for support. But as a result of a long illness, he died on January 15, 2018, in Brzezinka, Poland. He was buried on January 19, 2018, at the municipal cemetery in Oświęcim.

=== After death ===
On October 8, 2020, information about a documentary about Mikołaj appeared on the Shining Beats website. In the musician's Facebook profile, MBrother's wife, Wioletta Jaskółka, posted an entry, in which she asked fans to share materials for the documentary. From that moment on, nothing more is known about the film.

=== Joint projects ===
He released various singles together with various DJs under the following pseudonyms:

- Spring Fever and Golden Age (with his wife Wioletta Jaskółka)
- East-West Rockerz (with Flashrider and DJ Manian)
- Mix Masters (with Sławomir Szczepaniak)
- Rilectro (with Rico Bass)
- Hit Machine (with DJ Magic)

== Discography (selection) ==
=== Albums ===
- 2006: Just in the Mix
- 2006: Master Mix by MBrother – MBrother
- 2007: Jump! (feat. Forseco)
- 2007: Karnawał 2008 w rytmie dance (feat. Max Farenthide)
- 2012: Dancefloor (2night) EP
- 2015: Hold on EP
- 2017: M.E.P. MBrother Electronica Project – New Life

=== Singles ===
- Trebles (2004)
- What (2004)
- Tell Me (2005)
- What (Remake) (2006)
- Diabolissimo (vs. Forseco) (2007)
- I Can't Wait No More (2007)
- Jump! (2007)
- Say It (2008)
- 5 Minutes Excitement (2008)
- Bring Back (2008)
