= Jula (singer) =

Polish singer and songwriter

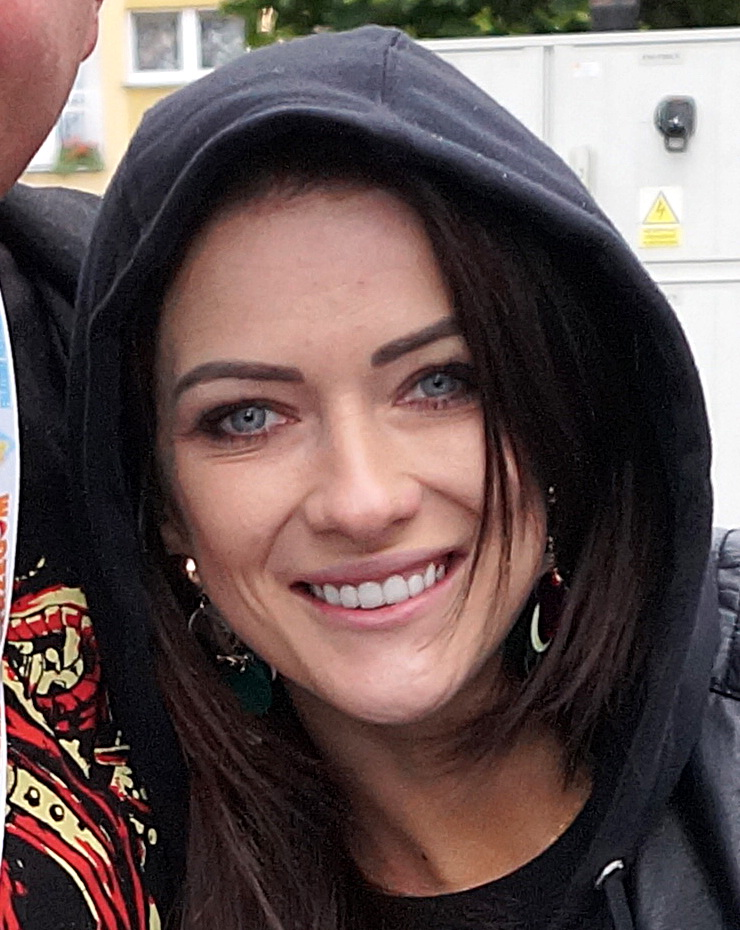
- Jula, 2018
- Born: Julita Ratowska; March 3, 1991 (age 35); Łomża, Poland
- Occupations: Singer, songwriter
- Spouse: Marcin "Fabisz" Fabiszewski
- Musical career
- Genres: Pop, pop rock
- Label: My Music

Jula (born Julita Ratowska, primo voto Julita Fabiszewska, 3 March 1991 in Łomża) is a Polish singer and songwriter. Known for her hits "Za każdym razem", "Nie zatrzymasz mnie" and "Kiedyś odnajdziemy siebie". Her debut album, Na krawędzi was released August 14, 2012.

== Career ==
She gained popularity due to her amateur musical recordings published on the internet. "Za każdym razem" was recorded at home, gained more than a million viewers. The professionally recorded single music was composed by Adi Owsianik, leader of Rotten Bark.

In 2012, Jula was awarded from the radio listeners of RMF MAXXX, at the festival TOPtrendy 2012 Trends in concert. On 2 June of the same year with the song "Za każdym razem" she performed at the concert Prime Minister on 49th Festival of Opole in Opole. On July 20, 2012, during a live at the Eska Music Awards 2012 she was awarded for the Best New Artist and Best Artist ESKA.pl. On August 14 of the same year by My Music, she released her debut album Na krawędzi. In 2013 the singer was nominated for Kids' Choice Awards 2013.

=== Participation in Bitwa na głosy ===
In July 2012, Jula officially confirmed her participation in the third edition of the Bitwa na głosy, in which the singer took on the role of team coach Lomza. On August 23 the promotional video for the edition was premiered. Jula's team was knocked out of the 13 October in the sixth episode, taking fifth place.

== Awards and nominations ==
Eska Music Awards

- Won: "Best Eska Artist"
- Won: "Best Debuting Artist"
- Nominated: "Best Hit" for single "Za każdym razem"
- Nominated: "Best Actress"

TOPtrendy

- Won (2012): "Internet Award" / "Audience Award" / Radio RMF MAXXX Award
- Nominated (2013): "Best Hit of Year" for single "Nie zatrzymasz mnie"

== Discography ==
=== Albums ===
Title	Album details	Peak chart positions	Sales	Certifications
Title	Album details	POL	Sales	Certifications
Na krawędzi	Released: August 14, 2012; Label: My Music; Formats: CD, digital download	3	POL: 15,000+	POL: Gold
180°	Released: June 17, 2014; Label: My Music; Formats: CD, digital download	24		
Milion słów	Released: May 26, 2017; Label: Warner Music Poland; Formats: CD, digital download	14		
"—" denotes a recording that did not chart or was not released in that territory.

=== Singles ===
Title	Year	Peak chart positions	Album
Title	Year	POL	Album
"Za każdym razem"	2012	1	Na krawędzi
"Nie zatrzymasz mnie"	2012	1	Na krawędzi
"Ślad"	2013	—	180°
"Przed siebie"	2014	—	180°
"Milion Slow"	2016	19	—
"—" denotes a recording that did not chart or was not released in that territory.

=== Music videos ===
Title	Year	Directed	Album
"Nie zatrzymasz mnie"	2012	Endorfina Artmedia	Na krawędzi
"Kiedyś odnajdziemy siebie"	2012	Endorfina Artmedia	Na krawędzi
"Ślad"	2013	—	180°
"Nieśmiertelni"	2014	Michał Kwiatek	180°
