= Flashrider =

Polish DJ and music producer (born 1974)

Sebastian Kaizik
- Sebastian Daniel Kaizik
- Born: September 1974 (age 51)
- Occupations: DJ, music producer
- Years active: 1997–present
- Organization: Flash Entertainment
- Notable work: Attenzione! (2002)
- Website: https://www.flashrider.com/

Sebastian Daniel Kaizik (born September 1974), better known as Flashrider, is a Polish-German DJ and music producer in the hands up and house genres.

== Biography ==
Sebastian Kaizik was born in September 1974 in Poland, of German ethnicity.

Sebastian discovered his passion for music around 1995. In 1997, his first concert took place in Cologne. In 1998 he recorded his first single called "Onga in Tokyo". In 2001, Flashrider became a resident of the "Chorzów Pyramide" club. He also got to know and started working with Sebastian Golasik. In 2002, Yann Peifer (Yanou) and Sven Petersen offered them a long-term cooperation. In the same year, they founded their own studio "S-Cape Studio" in Koblenz, where Flashrider's second single, "Attenzione!" was recorded and mixed. It became a hit in Poland and some European countries. In addition, "Attenzione!" reached 3rd place on the US Dance Singles Sales chart (published by Billboard magazine), which included data on sales of dance singles and remixes on physical media. A video clip for this single was shot in 2004.

In 2003, Flashrider initiated a collaboration with the Polish project Base Attack, founded by Paweł Mildner and Andrzej Hołubowicz. Flashrider undertook the reproduction of their track "Everybody," inviting vocalist Kid Panic to participate and incorporating samples of Eminem. The result of their joint work was the single "Nobody Listens To Techno," which brought Base Attack recognition on the German dance scene and climbed the charts in several European countries. After Mildner left the project in 2004, Andrzej Hołubowicz continued his solo career under the name Base Attack and released remixes together with Flashrider. Together, they also worked within the projects Magnezz and Sample Gangsters. Their collaboration continued until 2011.

In 2004, Sebastian opened his own label with headquarters in Gliwice, Flash Music. In the same year, Flashrider noticed a demo recording by a young Polish musician, Grzegorz Cebula (C-BooL), and signed him to his label. Thanks to this collaboration, the track "Would You Feel" underwent professional mastering under the direction of DJ Manian, while Flashrider and Ziggy X prepared remixes for it. The release enabled C-BooL to enter the German and European markets, effectively launching his professional career. Well-known artists have signed a contract with Flash Music: the previously mentioned C-BooL, which got off to a good start on the label, Base Attack, as well as bands that were DJ Manian, Bass-T, MBrother and others. Then Flashrider releases his next single: "Sex in the Club". It was produced by Yann Peifer and Manuel Reuter and was performed by Sebastian himself and the DJ Pulsedriver.

Later, Flash Music was expanded into Flash Entertainment, and under this name, he continued releasing records until at least 2024. As a result, albums released on Flash Entertainment received 15 gold and platinum records, while artists working with the label earned numerous awards and nominations.

Then Flashrider played in many bands such as East-West Rockerz, S-Force One and others. He has also made more than 100 remixes. In 2005, Sebastian released the album Rainbow under the pseudonym Danny-S together with Kamil Staniszewski (Taito). In 2006, Flashrider, together with the Polish band Wanda I Banda, released the single Nie Będę Julią, a remake of a version of the song from 1984. The single was released on the Magic News label at number 122. In 2008 he released the single "Keep Me Hanging On 2k9" as Danny-S, and in 2013 he released the single "So in Luv" as a Flashrider together with Kelli Leigh and Renald. The video clip for the latter was shot at New York City and released in the same year. Next he played at Kontor Records parties. From 2014 to 2015 he worked as a DJ at Liquid Studios.

=== Joint projects ===
He released various singles together with various DJs under the following pseudonyms:

- S-Force One (with Bass-T)
- East-West Rockerz (with DJ Manian and MBrother)
- S-Cape (with Sebastian Golasik)
- Magnezz (with Base Attack)
- Sample Gangsters (with Taito, Base Attack and BBX)

== Discography ==
Charts
Country	Song	Date	Position
Germany	Attenzione!	10.03.2003	82 (1 week)

Albums

- 2005: Rainbow (Danny-S vs. Taito)

Singles

- 1998: Onga In Tokyo
- 2002: Attenzione!
- 2004: Sex in the Club
- 2006: Nie Będę Julią (vs. Wanda I Banda)
- 2008: Keep Me Hanging On 2k9 (als Danny-S)
- 2013: So in Luv (feat. Kelli Leigh & Renald)

Music videos

- 2003: Attenzione!
- 2013: So in Luv
