= My Music (record label) =

- Parent company: My Music Group
- Founded: 2006
- Founder: Remigiusz Łupicki, Dominik Urbański
- Genre: various
- Country of origin: Poznań, Poland
- Location: Poland

My Music, is a Polish record label founded in 2006 in Poznań by Remigiusz "DJ Remo" Łupicki and Dominik Urbański, previously owners of UMC Records.

Labels best selling artists include such artists as Gosia Andrzejewicz, Eldo, Dawid Kwiatkowski and Agnieszka Włodarczyk among others, with several albums certified Gold in Poland.

== Artists ==
=== Current ===
- CF98
- Dawid Kwiatkowski
- dziecięce przeboje
- Eldo
- Irena Santor
- Gosia Andrzejewicz
- Hans Solo
- HST
- Ira
- Jula
- Mariusz Wawrzyńczyk
- Mezo
- Michał Wiśniewski
- Mrokas
- Patrycja Grabarczyk
- Pięć Dwa Dębiec
- Red Lips
- RH+
- Saszan
- SBS
- Verba

=== Former ===
- Abradab
- Agnieszka Włodarczyk
- Bauagan
- B.O.K
- Chiwas & Nowator
- DJ Remo
- DKA
- DNA & GAL
- Doniu
- Doniu & Liber
- Duże Pe
- Dziun
- Fenomen
- Furia Futrzaków
- Grupa Operacyjna
- High End Projekt
- Indios Bravos
- Jay Delano
- MBrother
- Jeden Osiem L
- Kalwi & Remi
- Kasia Wilk
- KrzyHu
- Kris
- Kto To
- Liber
- Los Pierdols
- Mezo, Tabb & Kasia Wilk
- Michał Łanuszka
- Owal/Emcedwa
- Piotr Banach
- Pneuma (disbanded)
- Proletaryat
- PTP
- Red & Spinache
- Robert M.
- Rotary
- Sumptuastic
- Sylwia Grzeszczak & Liber
- Tallib
- Wolny Band
- Wojciech Więckowski
