= Verba (band) =

Polish pop band

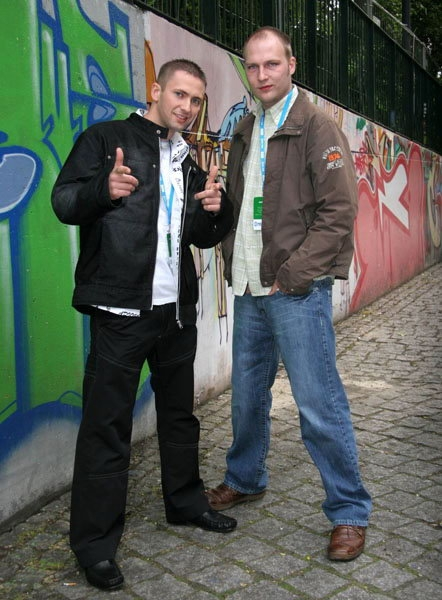
- Verba

Background information
- Also known as: Bartas & Ignac
- Origin: Piła, Poland
- Genres: Pop
- Years active: 1997 - present
- Labels: UMC Records, My Music
- Members: Bartłomiej Kielar; Przemysław Malita
- Past members: Ignacy Ereński
- Website: www.verba.umc.pl

Verba is a Polish band from Piła formed in 1997. It originated from the pop music group Squad Centralny. At first Bartek and Ignacy represented different music styles such as (techno, house, elektro and jungle). Later they became fascinated with hip-hop, at which point they began composing hip-hop music with Rap elements. Bartek took care of composing the songs, while at first Ignacy wrote the lyrics. Later, both of them attended to the lyrics. rap became a prevailing characteristic of their compositions and hip-hop took second stage.

The band influenced other Polish rap artists with similar styles like Ascetoholix, Jeden Osiem L, Mezo, Owal and 52 Dębiec some years ago. The first major label album 'Ósmy marca' (they also have three demo CDs 'at account') increased the popularity of the band. Until now the duo has released six albums (four studio albums and two compilations) as well as nine video clips. They have also won a lot of awards.

== History ==
=== Early bands ===
The first hip-hop formation was called BRAx2 and would later become Verba. The group began making music in 1997. The band included three people: Ignac, Wiktor and Witek. Soon afterwards it transformed to group Mechanizm. This band comprised the previous members plus Tylas, Biker and Rynias. They recorded material on two 'demos'. After a short time the group disintegrated. The members continued their activity and soon created a new hip-hop group Squad Centralny.

=== Squad Centralny ===
The band included Ignac, Tylas and Bartas (as record producer). They recorded the 'illegal' CD 'Squad Centralny. Pierwsze natarcie' (Squad Centralny. 1st attack). After Wiktor had joined them, the group released 'Drugie Natarcie Squadu Centralnego' (2nd attack of Squad Centralny). It also planned the publication 'Trzecie Natarcie Squadu Centralnego' (3rd attack of Squad Centralny).

After the departure of Tylas and Wiktor (producer of 'Gangland' ), they changed their name to VerbaFreniX and produced two video clips" 'Chora miłość” (Crazy {or ill} love) and „Wiem jak to jest (RMX)' (I know how it is (Remix)). Later the duo adopted the name Verba and began producing rap.

== Awards and nominations ==
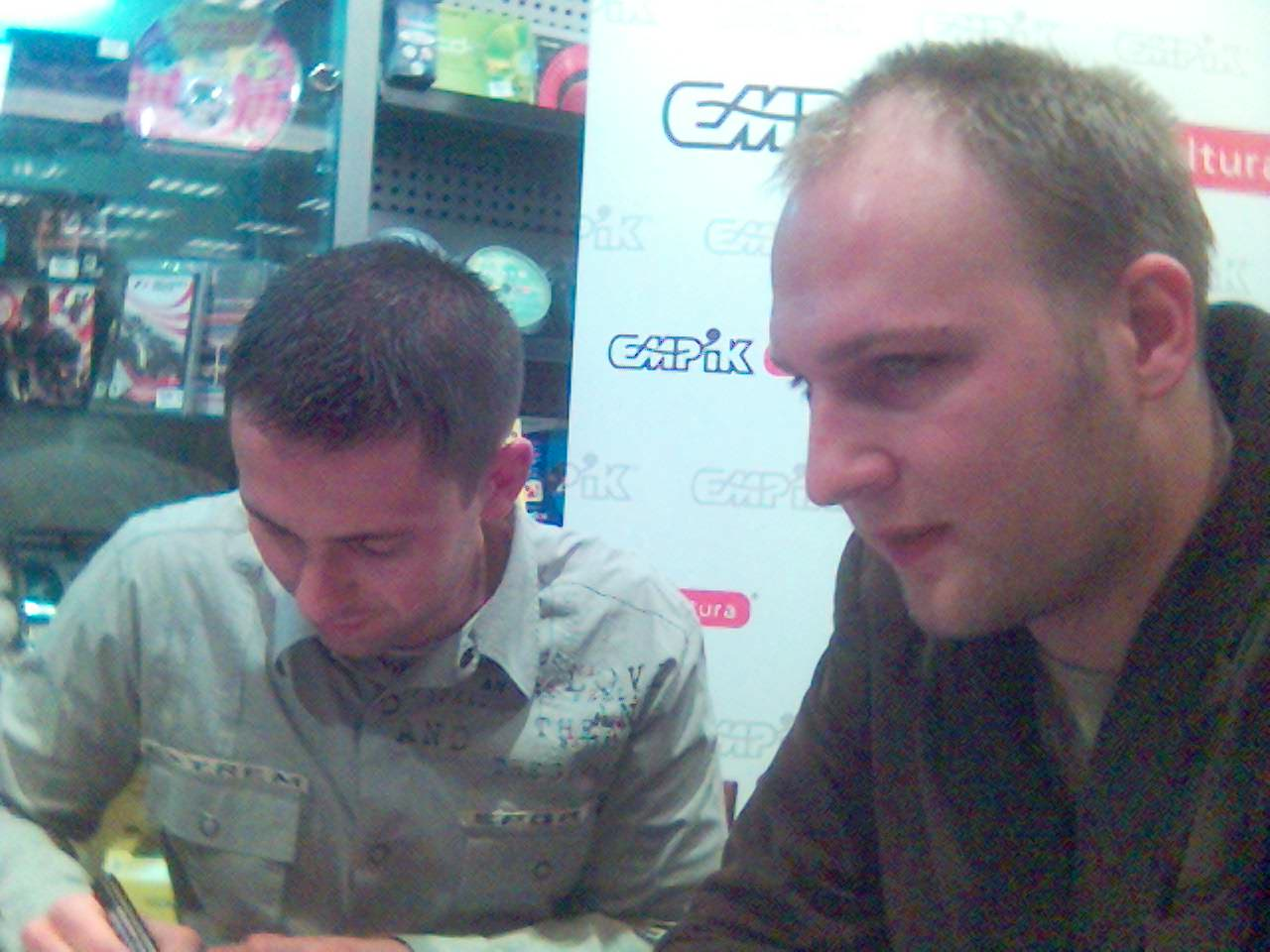
Photo of vocalists from Legnica (Galeria Piastów)

- Eska Music Awards 2006:

The band won in the category 'Debiut Roku' (Debut of the Year) and was also nominated for 'Album Roku' (Album of the Year) and 'Zespół Roku' (Band of the Year).

- Superjedynki 2006:

The album 'Dwudziesty pierwszy listopada' won in the category 'Płyta hiphopowa' (Best Hip Hop Album).

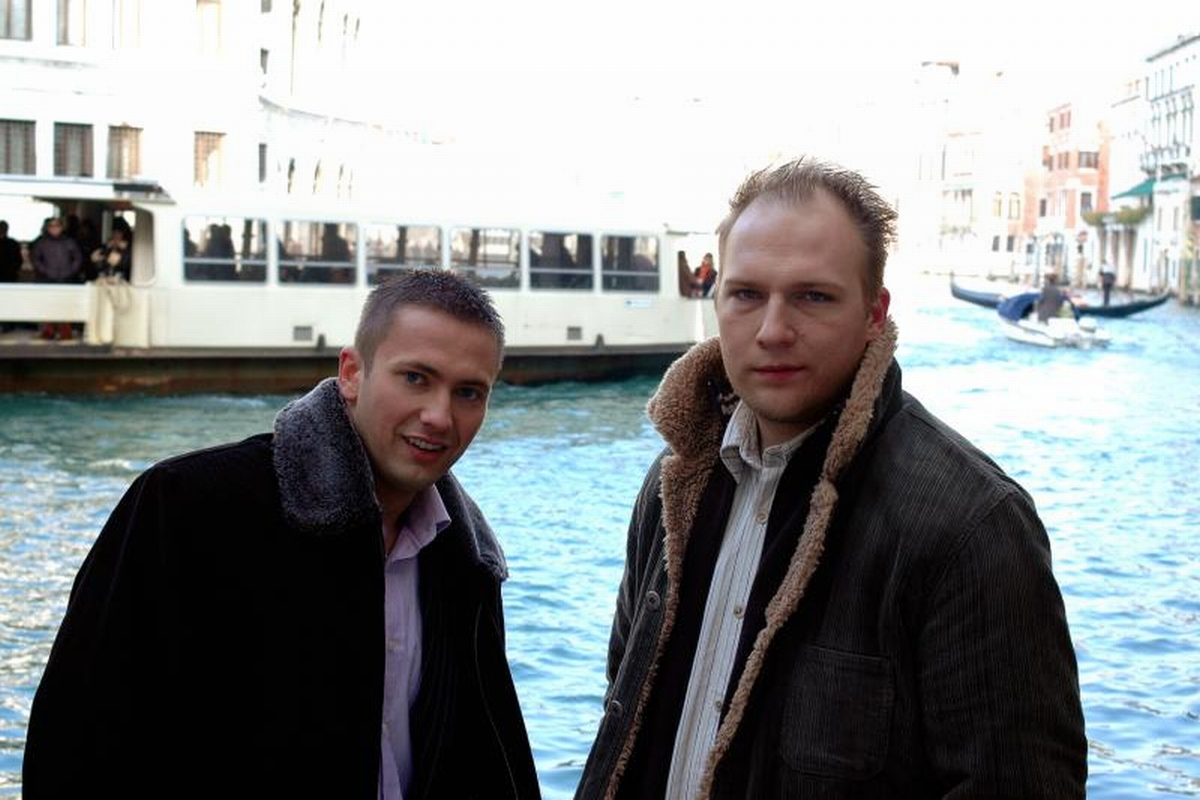
Photo of musics from Venice

- Bravoora 2006:

The band came in third in the category 'Zespół/rap' (Band/Pop).

- Mikrofony Popcornu 2006:

Verba won a second prize in the category 'Hip Hop - Polska' (Hip hop - Poland) and the third prize as 'Zespół Roku - Polska' (Band of the Year).

== Discography ==
=== Studio albums ===
Title	Album details	Peak chart positions	Sales
Title	Album details	POL	Sales
Ósmy marca	Released: March 7, 2005; Label: UMC Records; Formats: CD, digital download	13	POL: 4,000+
Dwudziesty pierwszy listopada	Released: November 21, 2005; Label: UMC Records; Formats: CD, digital download	40	POL: 4,000+
Trzydziesty października	Released: October 30, 2006; Label: My Music; Formats: CD, digital download	14	
Szósty grudnia	Released: December 10, 2007; Label: My Music; Formats: CD, digital download	36	
Młode wilki	Released: April 6, 2009; Label: My Music; Formats: CD, digital download	46	
Nie łam mi serca	Released: November 30, 2009; Label: My Music; Formats: CD, digital download	—	
21 marca	Released: 21 marca 2011; Label: My Music; Formats: CD, digital download	—	
14 lutego	Released: February 12, 2013; Label: My Music; Formats: CD, digital download	30	
Miłość i przyjaźń	Released: January 21, 2014; Label: My Music; Formats: CD, digital download	10	
"—" denotes a recording that did not chart or was not released in that territory.

=== Compilation albums ===
Title	Album details	Peak chart positions
Title	Album details	POL
Największe przeboje	Released: April 24, 2006; Label: My Music; Formats: CD, digital download	11
Największe przeboje vol.2	Released: March 5, 2007; Label: My Music; Formats: CD	37
The Greatest Hits	Released: September 8, 2008; Label: My Music; Formats: CD	—
"—" denotes a recording that did not chart or was not released in that territory.
