= Wanda i Banda =

Polish rock band

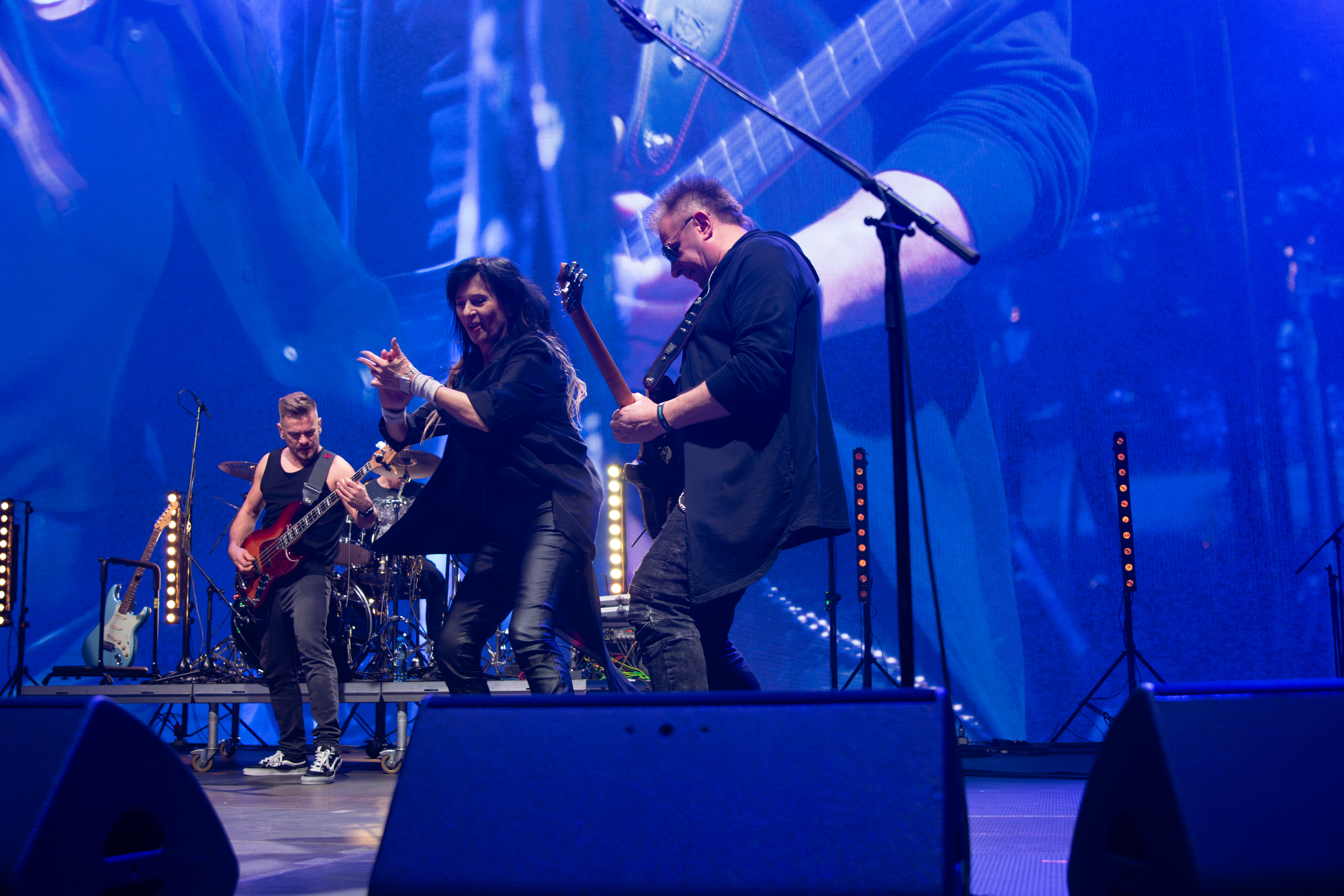
- Wanda i Banda live in 2024

Background information
- Also known as: Banda i Wanda
- Origin: Poland
- Genres: Pop rock, rock, new wave
- Years active: 1982–1986; 1993–1995; 2000–present
- Labels: Polskie Nagrania Muza, Pronit, Tonpress, Intersonus, Box Music, EMI Music Poland
- Website: https://wandaibanda.pl/

Wanda i Banda (stylized as Wanda & Banda, previously known as Banda i Wanda) are a Polish rock musical group. At the peak of their popularity in the mid-1980s, they scored hits like "Hi-Fi", "Nie będę Julią", "Kochaj mnie miły", "Podróżni bez biletu (Mamy czas)" and "Siedem życzeń". The band's leader and vocalist is Wanda Kwietniewska.

== History ==
In September 1982, vocalist Wanda Kwietniewska left the rock band Lombard and in November, established her own group, Banda i Wanda. The following year, they spawned a number of hits, including "Fabryka marzeń", "Nie będę Julią", "Hi-Fi" and "Chcę zapomnieć", earning a sizeable teenage following. Their debut, self-titled album was released in 1984 by Polskie Nagrania Muza and was certified gold. In 1985, they followed the success with the second LP, Mamy czas, released by Pronit, with further hits "Kochaj mnie miły" and "Podróżni bez biletu (Mamy czas)". The band toured extensively in Poland, and also in East Germany and Czechoslovakia.

In 1986, the long-delayed teen series Siedem życzeń premiered on TV, in which the band appeared as themselves and performed nine songs, including the popular title track. Despite being one of the most popular acts in Poland at that time, Banda i Wanda disbanded in the same year. In 1988, Kwietniewska was performing in Japanese spa town Kinugawa Onsen for six months. She released a solo album in 1990, Własna California, which included the moderate hit "Co z tobą".

In 1992, the compilation Wanda z Bandą i bez Bandy was released, consisting of a selection of the band's songs, Wanda's solo material and four new tracks. Banda i Wanda officially reformed in 1993 with new musicians. The band performed at festivals in Poland and Belarus and released another compilation, Ballady rockowe, in 1994. However, the following year Banda i Wanda went on a hiatus again.

The band made a comeback in May 2000 with a new line-up under the moniker Wanda i Banda. In 2001, the released new singles "Te noce są gorące", followed by "Kanonady galopady". Both tracks were included on the compilation Platynowa płyta, released at the end of 2003 by Box Music and Pomaton EMI. Another compilation followed in 2005, Złota kolekcja: Hi-Fi, with the new single "Fajny numer".

Polish DJ duo Wet Fingers remixed "Hi-Fi" in a dance fashion in 2006, and the new version, titled "Hi-Fi Superstar", garnered a considerable airplay on the radio and the club scene. In 2006, together with the Polish DJ Flashrider, Wanda i Banda released the single "Nie Będę Julią", a remake of a version of the song from 1984. The single was released on the Magic News label at number 122. In 2008, DJ duo Kalwi & Remi remixed "Nie będę Julią" which also enjoyed renewed popularity. The band's new studio album, Z miłości do strun, was released in 2008, and a year later was followed by an album of re-recorded songs from Siedem życzeń. Both CDs were released by minor label Box Music.

== Band members ==
=== Current members ===
- Wanda Kwietniewska – vocal
- Waldemar Szoff – guitar
- Marek Tymkoff – guitar, backing vocals
- Dominik Samborski – bass guitar
- Damian Grodziński – drums

=== Past members ===
- Marek Raduli – guitar
- Jacek Krzaklewski – guitar
- Henryk Baran – bass guitar
- Andrzej Tylec – drums
- Marek Kapłon – drums
- Krzysztof Gabłoński – guitar
- Krzysztof Bożek – guitar
- Grzegorz Suski – bass guitar
- Filip Leszczyński – drums
- Katarzyna Szubartowska – backing vocals
- Piotr Korzonek – bass guitar
- Bartek Jończyk – guitar
- Wiktoria Trynkiewicz – backing vocals

== Discography ==
=== Studio albums ===
- Banda i Wanda (1984)
- Mamy czas (1985)
- Z miłości do strun (2008)
- Piosenki z serialu Siedem życzeń (2009)

=== Compilations ===
- Wanda z Bandą i bez Bandy (1992)
- Ballady rockowe (1994)
- The Very Best of Banda & Wanda (1994)
- Moje przeboje (1998)
- Platynowa płyta (2003)
- Złota kolekcja: Hi-Fi (2005)
