= Gosia Andrzejewicz =

Polish singer (born 1984)

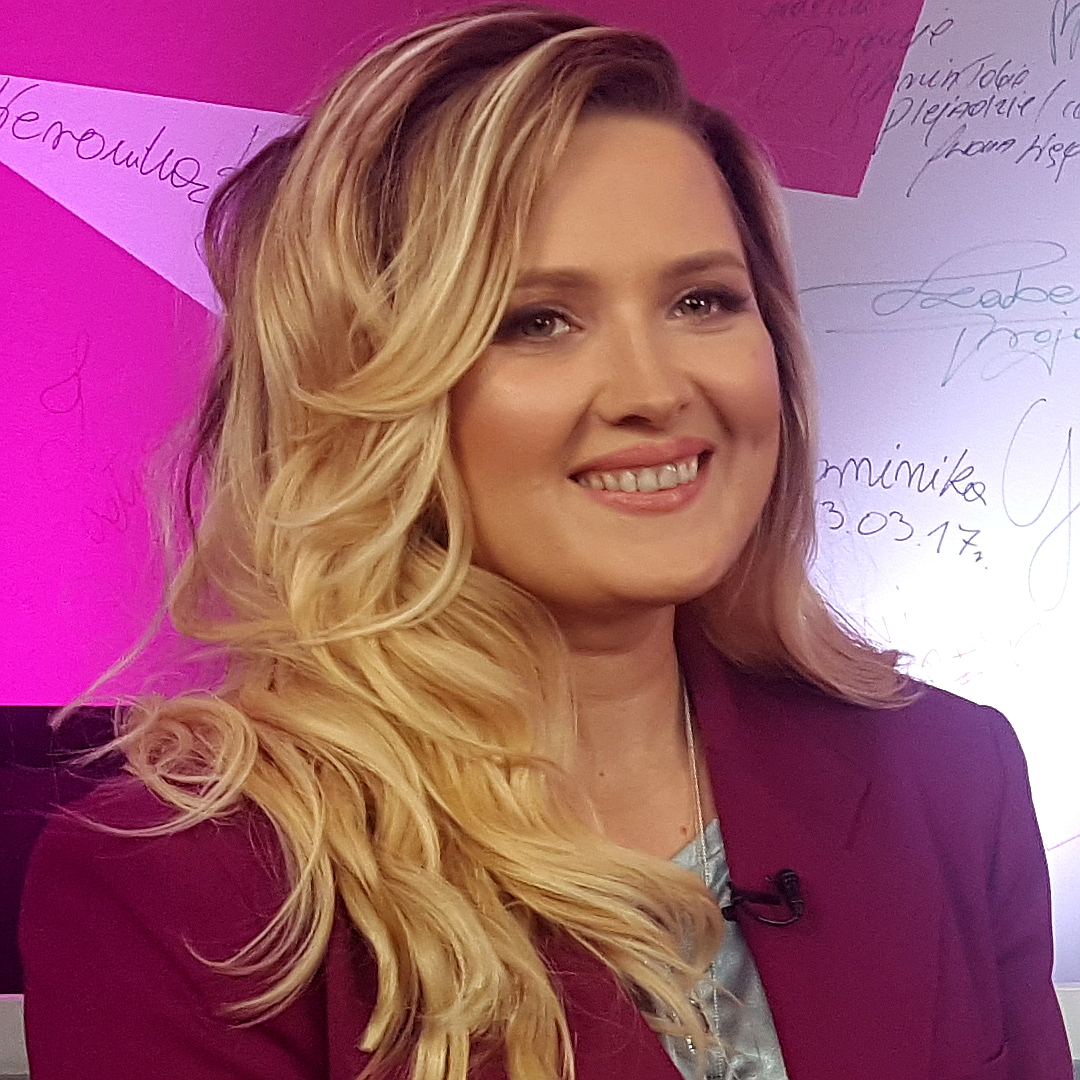
- Gosia in 2017

Background information
- Born: Małgorzata Andrzejewicz; 14 January 1984 (age 42); Bytom, Poland
- Genres: Pop, dance
- Occupations: Musician, songwriter
- Instrument: Vocals
- Years active: 2004 – present
- Label: My Music
- Website: http://www.gosiaandrzejewicz.pl/

Małgorzata "Gosia" Andrzejewicz (born 14 January 1984) is a Polish singer. She debuted in 2004 and has since earned major hits in Poland, like "Pozwól żyć", "Słowa" and "Trochę ciepła". Two of her albums have been certified Gold in her home country, Gosia Andrzejewicz Plus and Lustro, both released in 2006.

== Career ==
Gosia has won over 30 singing contest awards and performed in a jazz group for a short period of time. In 2004, she released her first self-titled album independently, which contained hits "Nieśmiały chłopak" and "Wielbicielka". After signing a contract with Polish record label My Music, her debut album was re-released with additional songs as Gosia Andrzejewicz Plus in 2006 and spawned the major hits "Pozwól żyć" and "Słowa". Released later that year, the album Lustro contained the successful singles "Trochę ciepła" and "Lustro". Both records were certified Gold in Poland. Gosia has won many music awards and quickly became one of the biggest pop stars in her home country. 2007 saw the release of her first greatest hits album and a fundraising compilation of winter and Christmas songs, Zimno? Przytul mnie!.

In 2008, Gosia went on to record club-friendly music, contrary to her previous, pop ballad-oriented material. Her collaboration with DJ Remo, "You Can Dance" was a big hit, as well as "Lips", released in 2009 with Polish DJ duo Kalwi & Remi. Her next studio album, Wojowniczka, was released in the summer of 2009 and consisted of pop-dance material, with half of the songs sung in English. The album spawned three singles, including her next hit, "Otwórz oczy". In 2012, Gosia collaborated with Dr. Alban on the song "Loverboy," which proved to be another success. In 2013, Gosia released the single "I'm Not Afraid" which was submitted to the Swiss pre-selections to the Eurovision Song Contest 2014. After the online vote, the song entered the top 9, but failed to pass the "expert check".

Andrzejewicz released her next studio album Film in November 2014. The double disc album was promoted by songs "Film", "Ciszej" and "Klucz", but failed to chart.

== Discography ==
=== Studio albums ===
Title	Album details	Peak chart positions	Certifications
Title	Album details	POL	Certifications
Gosia Andrzejewicz	Released: 24 October 2004; Label: Pearl Music; Formats: CD	—	
Gosia Andrzejewicz Plus	Released: 10 April 2006; Label: My Music; Formats: CD, digital download	14	POL: Gold
Lustro	Released: 20 November 2006; Label: My Music; Formats: CD, digital download	17	POL: Gold
Wojowniczka	Released: 17 August 2009; Label: My Music; Formats: CD, digital download	36	
Film	Released: 25 November 2014; Label: My Music; Formats: CD, digital download	—	
"—" denotes a recording that did not chart or was not released in that territory.

=== Compilation albums ===
Title	Album details	Peak chart positions
Title	Album details	POL
The Best of Gosia Andrzejewicz	Released: 23 April 2007; Label: My Music; Formats: CD	25
"—" denotes a recording that did not chart or was not released in that territory.

=== Singles ===
Year	Title	Album
2004	"Nieśmiały chłopak"	Gosia Andrzejewicz
2004	"Wielbicielka"	Gosia Andrzejewicz
2005	"Trudny wybór"	Gosia Andrzejewicz
2005	"Miłość"	Gosia Andrzejewicz
2005	"Waiting for Love" (feat. Krist Van D & MK Schulz)	Krist Van D & Friends Vol. 1 (Krist Van D album)
2006	"Dangerous Game"	Gosia Andrzejewicz Plus
2006	"Pozwól żyć"	Gosia Andrzejewicz Plus
2006	"Słowa"	Gosia Andrzejewicz Plus
2006	"Trochę ciepła"	Lustro
2007	"Lustro"	Lustro
2007	"Latino"	The Best of Gosia Andrzejewicz
2007	"Siła marzeń"	The Best of Gosia Andrzejewicz
2007	"Magia świąt"	Zimno? Przytul mnie! (various artists album)
2008	"You Can Dance" (feat. DJ Remo)	You Can Dance (DJ Remo album)
2008	"Feel'In" (feat. DJ Remo)	You Can Dance (DJ Remo album)
2009	"Lips" (feat. Kalwi & Remi)	Kiss Me Girl (Kalwi & Remi album)
2009	"Taste Me All Day" (feat. DJ Remo)	My Music - My Pleasure (DJ Remo album)
2009	"Otwórz oczy"	Wojowniczka
2009	"Zabierz mnie"	Wojowniczka
2010	"Emotions" (feat. DJ Remo)	Impreska Vol. 3 (various artists album)
2010	"Wojowniczka"	Wojowniczka
2010	"You"	Film
2011	"Contagious" (as S#G Projects)	Film
2012	"Loverboy" (feat. Dr. Alban)	Film
2012	"Film"	Film
2012	"Choose to Believe" (feat. NatStar & St0ne)	Film
2012	"Superstar" (feat. Krist Van D)	Film
2013	"I'm Not Afraid"	Film
2014	"Ciszej"	Film
2014	"Klucz"	Film
2021	"Otwórz oczy” (version 2021)	
2022	"Tylko mój	
2023	"Na zawsze"	
2023	"Soulmate"	
