= Nathan Currier =

American composer

Nathan Currier (born 1960, Huntingdon, Pennsylvania) is an American composer.

== Biography ==
Coming from a musical family, Currier is son of composer Marilyn Currier (1931) and brother of composer Sebastian Currier (1959).

His principal teachers were David Diamond, Joseph Schwantner, Bernard Rands, Stephen Albert and Frederic Rzewski. He studied at the Juilliard School, where he received the Doctorate in 1989, and also served on their Evening Division faculty over a ten-year period. Starting in 2007 he served for two years as a visiting faculty member at the McIntire Department of Music at the University of Virginia. In 2016 he initiated a concert series called Orchard Circle, with concerts in New York City and Philadelphia.

== Awards ==
- 2008 International Sackler Prize for Music Composition
- 2008-09 Fellowship at the Virginia Foundation for the Humanities
- 1999 Academy Award from The American Academy of Arts and Letters
- 1995-96 Rome Prize for Composition from the American Academy in Rome
- 1993 Guggenheim Fellowship
- 1993 National Endowment for the Arts Fellowship
- 1992 New York Foundation for the Arts Fellowship
- 1991 Fromm Foundation Grant
- 1991 Charles Ives Fellowship from The American Academy of Arts and Letters
- 1987-88 Fulbright Fellowship
- 1987 Barlow Prize in Composition

== Gaian Variations interrupted premiere ==
Currier's largest work is an oratorio called Gaian Variations. The premiere took place at Avery Fisher Hall, Lincoln Center, on April 21, 2004, but was interrupted mid-concert, shortly after the beginning of the third act. The work is about Gaia, a scientific hypothesis developed by James Lovelock to explain the role of living systems in the regulation of Earth's climate and biogeochemical cycles. The composer described his work as both a description of the theory and a contextualization of it within the history of science, and he spent years writing the large work for chorus, orchestra and soloists. During the premiere the Brooklyn Philharmonic suddenly stopped, claiming that it was headed into overtime, ultimately triggering a lawsuit.

Leading American composer John Corigliano, also a board member of the Brooklyn Philharmonic, called Gaian Variations, “Just beautiful. Very, very skilled work, and very inspired too.” The New York Times, however, published a highly critical review by Allan Kozinn that began by claiming the work's texts (featuring writings by Lovelock himself, describing his Gaia theory) were “mostly pseudoscientific.”

Currier, who has since given talks on climate change for Al Gore's The Climate Project, felt that the urgency of climate change gave the subject matter such importance that he had used his personal savings to prevent cancellation of the concert when neither the Brooklyn Philharmonic nor another environmental organization, Earth Day Network, raised the needed funds. Currier was given a pro bono lawyer through Volunteer Lawyers for the Arts shortly after the performance, but the Executive Vice President and Director of the Hess Oil Company, J. Barclay Collins II, also a client of the same firm (Akin Gump Strauss Hauer & Feld) and chairman of the Board of the Brooklyn Philharmonic, intervened, and Currier lost legal representation. On the New York Times's ArtsBeat blog, oil executive Collins (who retired from the petroleum company in January 2010) was quoted as saying that Currier's lawsuit was “totally without merit.” It was not until 2008 that Currier again found legal support, being represented by Alex T. Roshuk, and the case was finally filed in Supreme Court of the State of New York Kings County in 2009. Currier was quoted shortly thereafter in the New York Post as saying that he only wanted the orchestra to play the work again.

Currier later became actively involved with Gaia science itself. With NASA scientist Paul D. Lowman he coauthored a chapter of the book Chimeras and Consciousness, published by MIT Press in 2011. Their paper, Life’s Tectonics, concerns Gaia and the role of life and water on plate tectonics, and when NASA recently celebrated the 50th anniversary of its exobiology program (Seeking Signs of Life, October 2010), a passage from their paper was condensed and read as part of the opening keynote speech given by Lynn Margulis.
