= Zofia Nowakowska =

Polish singer (born 1988)

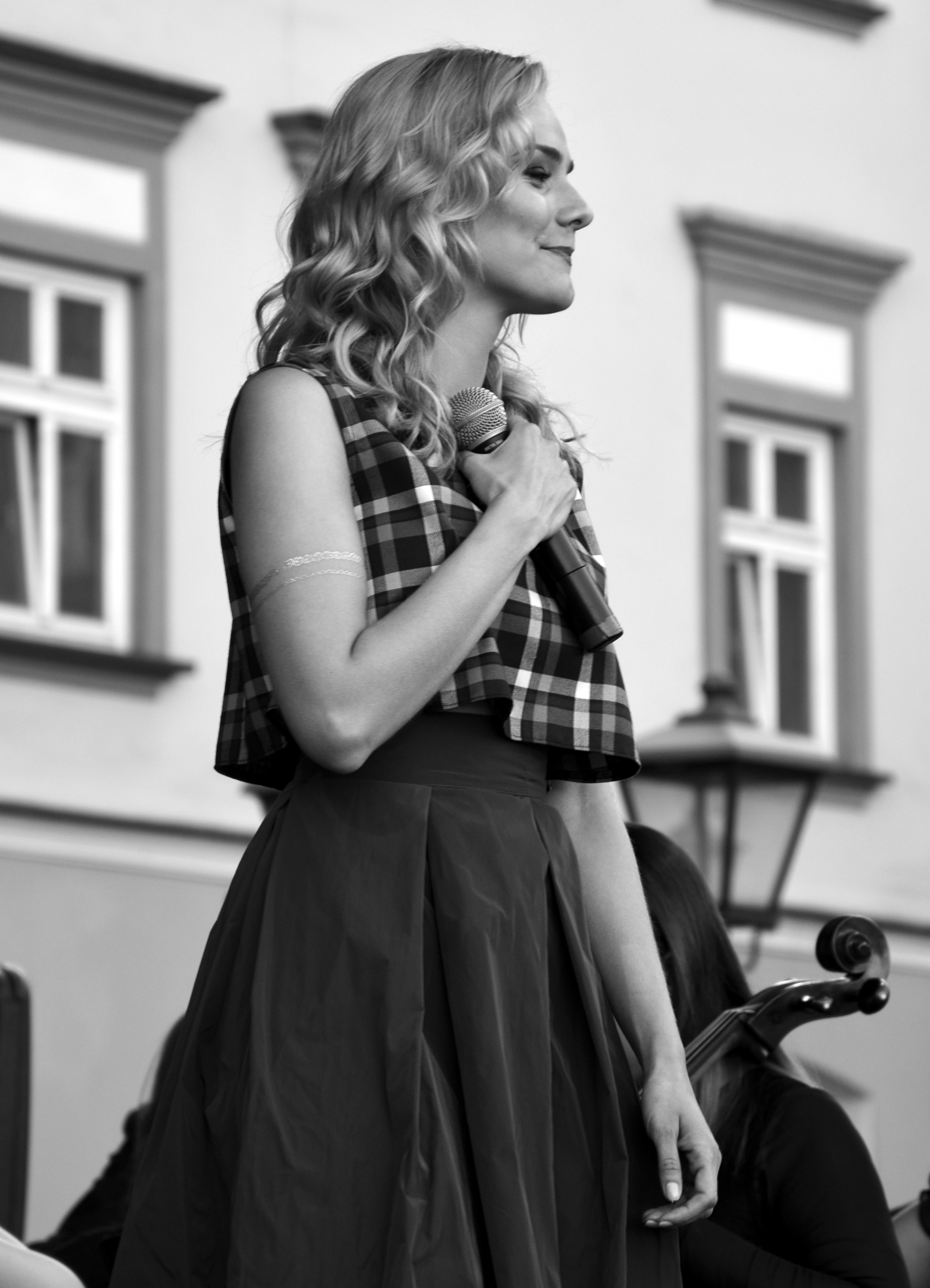

Zofia Nowakowska (born 25 February 1988, Kościan) is a Polish singer. Besides Polish performances, she has also recorded an English version of the song "The Right to Love".

From 2004-2010, Nowakowska was part of the Studio Buffo musical theatre company where she played in several roles including Marie Antoinette in Ça Ira, a musical written by Roger Waters.

She has worked on dubbing several Disney films into Polish, most notably doing the voice of Nala in The Lion King (2019).

In 2021, Nowakowska played the role of Jenna Hunterson in a Polish version of "Waitress the Musical". That same year, she released a new album with Belgian producer David Nox, entitled ECHO. She has also collaborated with several notable Polish musicians, including Piotr Rubik and Jacek Cygan.
