= Pięć Dwa =

Polish music group

Pięć Dwa Dębiec
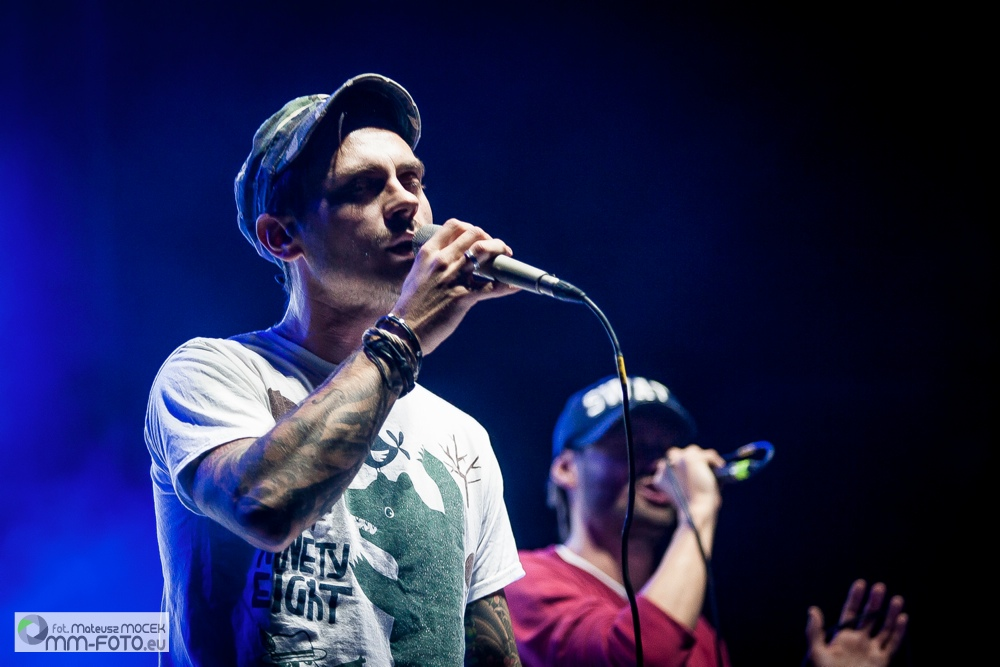
- Founder of Pięć Dwa, Hans (rapper)

Background information
- Also known as: 52 Dębiec, Pięć Dwa, 5-2
- Origin: Poznań, Poland
- Genres: hip hop
- Years active: 1999–present
- Labels: UMC Records, My Music
- Members: Hans; Deep

Pięć Dwa Dębiec (52 Dębiec, Pięć Dwa, 5-2) is a Polish music group that performs mainly rap-style music.

== Activity ==
The group was founded in Poznań in 1999 by Przemysław "Hans" Frencel and Paweł "Deep" Paczkowski. In 2000, they published an illegal album called Najwyższa instancja. In 2002, Deep left the group and stopped his activities for two years. On September 15, 2003, UMC Records published their first legal album called P-Ń VI. Deep didn't take part in the recording, but the album was published as 52 Dębiec (not as a solo of Hans). During the spring of 2004, Deep published an illegal album called We mnie, recorded in three months using home methods. On January 1, 2006, Hans became artistic director of UMC Records, but he resigned after one year. In that time, he published Deep's and Bobik's album Refleksje. In June 2007, the group was back in full squad and informed about the recording of a new album called Deep Hans. It was released on February 6, 2008. On June 2, 2008, 520 special, manually numbered copies were put up for sale (number 52 was given on a charity auction). The gain was used to record the next album.

The album T.R.I.P. was planned to be published in May 2009, but on April 20th, the group's studio "Myself" was robbed. Along with the equipment, the only copy of the recorded material was stolen. At the end, the album was released on October 31, 2009.

== Discography ==
=== Albums ===
Title	Album details	Peak chart positions	Sales
Title	Album details	POL	Sales
Najwyższa instancja	Released: 2000; Label: Self-released; Formats: CD	—	
P-Ń VI	Released: 11 September 2003; Label: UMC Records; Formats: CD, digital download	30	POL: 12,000+
Deep Hans	Released: 6 February 2008; Label: Self-released; Formats: CD, digital download	—	
T.R.I.P.	Released: 30 October 2009; Label: My Music; Formats: CD, digital download	48	
N.E.O.	Released: 17 June 2014; Label: My Music; Formats: CD, digital download	6	
Czyste szumienie	Released: 7 September 2018; Label: My Music; Formats: CD, digital download	3	
"—" position was not noted.

=== Compilation albums ===
Title	Album details
P-Ń X	Released: 21 November 2008; Label: My Music; Formats: CD+DVD

=== Charted songs ===
Year	Title	Position on the Charts
Year	Title	SLiP
2003	"Konfrontacje"	16
2004	"Powiem"	30
2004	"To my"	10
2005	Green Jolly - "Jest nas wielu" featuring Pięć Dwa Dębiec and others	16
2005	Doniu - "Uciekaj" featuring Pięć Dwa Dębiec	26

=== Guest performances ===
Year	Performer/Album	Record	Ref.
2000	Owal/Emcedwa - Samo Życie	"Oczy Złego" (feat. 52 Dębiec); "Wciąż Robi Coś Nowego" (feat. 52 Dębiec)	
2001	Ascetoholix - A	"Grunt" (feat. 52 Dębiec)	
2001	Slums Attack - Na legalu?	"I Moje Miasto Złą Sławą Owiane..." (feat. Lutawhuiklik, Ascetoholix, Owal/Emcedwa, Mezo, 52 Dębiec)	
2002	Owal/Emcedwa - Epizod II Rapnastyk	"Przepraszam" (feat. 52 Dębiec)	
2003	Ascetoholix - Apogeum	"(Ś)wiadomości" (feat. 52 Dębiec)	
2004	Liber - Bógmacher	"Puls" (feat. Kris, 52 Dębiec, Born, Agata)	
2004	Doniu - Monologimuzyka	"Uciekaj" (feat. 52 Dębiec)	
2004	Sekcja V - Eksperymenty dźwięku	"Rap Nie Umarł" (feat. 52 Dębiec)	
2006	Wiśnix - Bez Cięcia	"Kac" (feat. Tehac Wudu, 52 Dębiec)	
2006	Slums Attack - Fturując	"Kto" (feat. 52 Dębiec, Wiśnix)	
2008	Kris - Dar	"Barykady I Granice" (feat. 52 Dębiec)	

=== Music videos ===
Year	Title	Directed	Album	Ref.
2001	Ascetoholix – "Grunt" (featuring: 52 Dębiec)	Tomasz Zetti Zasowski	A	
2003	"Pięć dwa i GP"	Punkt Zero	P-ń VI	
2003	"Kto?" (featuring: Ski Skład)	Punkt Zero	P-ń VI	
2003	"Konfrontacje"	Ryba Film	P-ń VI	
2003	"Pies"	Mikołaj Kubicz	P-ń VI	
2004	"To my!" (featuring: Ascetoholix)	Stanisław Mąderek	P-ń VI	
2004	"Zawodnik(t)"	Punkt Zero	P-ń VI	
2004	Doniu – "Uciekaj" (featuring: 52 Dębiec)	Tomasz Jarosz	Monologimuzyka	
2004	"Powiem"	Stanisław Mąderek	Jest nas wielu	
2005	Greenjolly, Ascetoholix, Duże Pe, Mezo, Owal/Emcedwa, 52 Dębiec – "Jest nas wielu"	Tomasz Jarosz	Jest nas wielu	
2005	"Kryszmas alkoholis"	Punkt Zero	—	
2008	"Gniew"	Final Art	Deep Hans	
2008	"Matnia"	Tomasz Jarosz	Deep Hans	
2008	"Rise Up!" (featuring: The Old Cinema)	Tomasz Jarosz	P-ń X	
2009	"Spadłem"	Gregory Petitqueux	T.R.I.P.	
2010	"Gdzie ty jesteś?"	Tomasz Jarosz	T.R.I.P.	
2014	"Ersatz"	Tomasz Jarosz	N.E.O.	
