= Verba (surname) =

Verba is a surname. Notable people with the surname include:

- Ross Verba (born 1973), American football player
- Sidney Verba (1932–2019), American academic
