= Słowa =

Single by Gosia Andrzejewicz

from the album Gosia Andrzejewicz
- Released: 2006
- Genre: Pop
- Length: 3:16
- Label: My Music
- Songwriters: Gosia Andrzejewicz, Goffredo Orlandi

Gosia Andrzejewicz singles chronology
"Pozwól żyć" (2006)	"Słowa" (2006)	"Trochę ciepła" (2006)

"Słowa" (Polish for "Words") is a 2004 song by Polish singer Gosia Andrzejewicz. The song achieved nationwide success in 2006 and remains one of Gosia's biggest hits to date.

== Song information ==
"Słowa" was written by Gosia Andrzejewicz (lyrics) and Italian composer Goffredo Orlandi (music). The song originally featured on Gosia's eponymous debut album, released in 2004, and received considerable airplay, becoming a minor hit. In February and March 2005, the song enjoyed growing popularity on www.mp3.wp.pl, where the combined amount of its online plays and legal downloads has exceeded 3,000.

In 2006, after the re-release of the debut album and its success, "Słowa" was re-released as a follow-up to the popular single "Pozwól żyć", meeting with even bigger success. The song reached top positions on numerous radio lists and ultimately became one of Gosia's biggest hits. It featured in lists of the biggest hits of 2006 on NetFan.pl and RMF FM. An English language version of the song has also been recorded, entitled "Words".

The official music video was filmed on 19 July 2006 in Świnoujście, and premiered on 25 July. It quickly became one of the most popular video clips on Onet.pl and Interia.pl.
