= Oratorio Society =

Oratorio Society may refer to:

- Oratorio Society of Baltimore
- Oratorio Society of Charlottesville-Albemarle
- Oratorio Society of Chicago
- Hong Kong Oratorio Society
- Jakarta Oratorio Society
- Laurel Oratorio Society
- Oratorio Society of Minnesota
- Moscow Oratorio Society
- Oratorio Society of New Jersey
- Oratorio Society of New York
- Oratorio Society of Queens
- Rochester Oratorio Society
- Saskatoon Oratorio Society
- Oratorio Society of Utah
- Westchester Oratorio Society
