= Dziun =

Dziun, pseudonym of Magdalena Ciećka (born March 19, 1979, in Inowrocław) is a Polish singer and model.

She has been working as a model since she was 16, appearing on the covers of magazines all over the world. On 25 October 2011, the singer's debut album titled A.M.B.A was released

She was in a relationship with a Polish rapper Jacek "Tede" Graniecki.

== Discography ==
Albums

Year	Title	Chart listing
Year	Title	POL
2011	A.M.B.A: Date: 25 October 2011; Label: My Music/EMI Music Poland	36

Songs

Year	Name	Chart listing	Album
Year	Name	PRO	Album
2011	"Dobrze jest"	24	A.M.B.A

== Filmography ==
- Drogi (2012, director: Małgorzata Ruszkiewicz)
