= Gaian Variations =

Gaian Variations is an environmental oratorio by classical composer Nathan Currier, an abruptly terminated premiere of which took place at Avery Fisher Hall, Lincoln Center, New York on April 21, 2004.

The work is about the Gaia hypothesis of James Lovelock. Currier spent several years writing the large work; he felt that the urgency of climate change made raising awareness of Gaia theory important, and since the failed premiere has given talks on climate change for Al Gore's The Climate Project. When two institutions involved in the premiere, the Brooklyn Philharmonic and Earth Day Network, failed to raise the funds needed, Currier used personal funds to prevent its cancellation.

During the premiere, the Brooklyn Philharmonic orchestra suddenly stopped in the midst of the performance. The orchestra claimed it was headed into overtime, although Currier has disputed that in a lawsuit filed over the event. Allan Kozinn, at the time music critic for the New York Times said that the composer “seemed unable to end the work,” claimed that the texts were “pseudoscientific,” and harshly criticized the composition. Prominent American composer John Corigliano, also a board member of the Brooklyn Philharmonic, said on the other hand that Gaian Variations was “Just beautiful. Very, very skilled work, and very inspired too.” Currier was given a pro bono lawyer through Volunteer Lawyers for the Arts shortly after the performance. The Executive Vice President and Director of the Hess Oil Company, J. Barclay Collins II, also a client of the same firm and chairman of the Board of the Brooklyn Philharmonic, complained to the law firm, and Currier lost legal representation. On the New York Times Arts Beat Blog, Collins (who retired in January 2010 from the multi-billion dollar company) was also quoted as saying that Currier's lawsuit was "totally without merit." Starting in 2008 Currier was represented by Alex T. Roshuk, and the case was filed against the orchestra in Supreme Court of the State of New York, Kings County, in 2009.

An archival website about Gaian Variations and its premiere, gaianvariations.com, still exists. in the book Back to Darwin: A Richer Account of Evolution, by John B. Cobb (Eerdmans, 2008), Currier's Gaian Variations was discussed. In noting how a Gaia-oriented view might be beginning to spread around the world, Cobb wrote that, “The very existence of the new oratorio by Nathan Currier supports my hope.”
