= Dover discography =

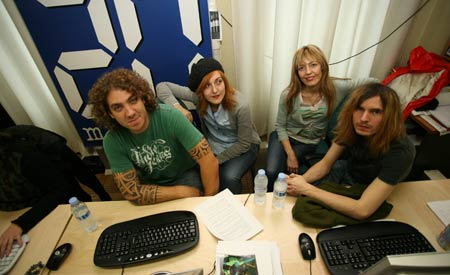
- Dover in 2006
- Studio albums: 8
- EPs: 1
- Compilation albums: 2
- Singles: 28
- Music videos: 23

The discography of Dover, a Spanish rock band, consists of eight studio albums, an extended play, two compilation albums, 28 singles, and 23 music videos.

During the middle of the 1990s, Dover released his first album, Sister, practically with no commercial success. It was not until his second album released in 1997, Devil Came to Me, when the band became famous. The album came to sell more than half a million copies worldwide, and the critics considered Dover the best group in the Spanish independent music scene. In 1999 they released their third album Late at Night, getting a triple platinum in February 2000. I Was Dead for 7 Weeks in the City of Angels is their fourth album, published in 2001, which achieved the number 1 on the Spanish sales list, selling over 125,000 discs in just over a week. A year later, in July 2002, they released their first EP, It's Good to Be Me!, with a total of eight songs, five live, two acoustic and one unreleased song: Mystic Love, which was single of this album. In 2003 they published the album The Flame, recorded entirely in Spain with the American producer Rick Will. This album sold about 50,000 copies in Spain and as many in Germany. In November 2005, Dover published in Japan its first compilation album titled Oh! Mother Russia, which contained the greatest hits from the last three studio albums. One year later, Dover gives a new, different and radical turn in his career with its album Follow the City Lights, published in 2006 with an imaginative blend of rock-electronic-dance-pop genres. In November 2007, Dover publishes a double compilation album titled 2, which contains the greatest hits in its electro pop version, plus a new song called Soldier. Its seventh studio album I Ka Kené would not be released until 2010, consisting of 10 songs sung in English, Bambara and French. This album was a commercial failure, selling just 5,000 copies. After a record five-year break, in 2015, the band from Madrid published a new album, Complications, leaving aside the electronic sound to return to their rocker roots. To date, Dover has sold nearly 2 million copies worldwide.

== Albums ==
=== Studio albums ===
Year	Album details	Positions	Sales	Certifications
Year	Album details	Spain	Sales	Certifications
1995	Sister: Released: 15 August; Label: Everlasting-Caroline	—	Spain: 700	—
1997	Devil Came to Me: Released: 21 April; Label: Subterfuge	8	Worldwide: 800.000+	SPA: 4× Platinum
1999	Late at Night: Released: 28 June; Label: Loli Jackson, Chrysalis	5	Worldwide: 300.000	SPA: 3× Platinum
2001	I Was Dead for 7 Weeks in the City of Angels: Released: 17 September; Label: Loli Jackson, Chrysalis	1	Worldwide: 215.000	SPA: 2× Platinum
2003	The Flame: Released: 27 October; Label: Capitol	11	Worldwide: 100.000	SPA: Gold; GER: Gold
2006	Follow the City Lights: Released: 2 October; Label: Capitol	4	Worldwide: 130.000	SPA: Platinum
2010	I Ka Kené: Released: 4 October; Label: Sony Music	14	Worldwide: 5.000	—
2015	Complications: Released: 9 February; Label: Octubre, Sony Music	20	—	—

=== Compilation albums ===
Year	Album details	Positions	Sales	Certifications
Year	Album details	Spain	Sales	Certifications
2005	Oh! Mother Russia: Released: 23 November; Label: Solitary Man Records	—	—	—
2007	2: Released: 27 November; Label: EMI Music	30	Worldwide: 40.000	—

== Extended plays ==
Year	Details	Positions	Sales	Certifications
Year	Details	Spain	Sales	Certifications
2002	It's Good to Be Me!: Released: 8 July; Label: EMI-Odeón, Chrysalis	—	—	—

== Singles ==
Year	Title	Peak chart positions	Album
Year	Title	Spain	Album
1997	"Serenade"	1	Devil Came to Me
1997	"Loli Jackson"	-	Devil Came to Me
1997	"Devil Came to Me"	-	Devil Came to Me
1998	"Judas"	-	Devil Came to Me
1999	"DJ"	1	Late at Night
1999	"Cherry Lee"	1	Late at Night
1999	"Flashback"	-	Late at Night
2000	"The Hitter"	-	Late at Night
2000	"Far"	-	Late at Night
2001	"King George"	1	I Was Dead for 7 Weeks in the City of Angels
2001	"The Weak Hour of the Rooster"	-	I Was Dead for 7 Weeks in the City of Angels
2002	"Better Day"	-	I Was Dead for 7 Weeks in the City of Angels
2002	"Big Mistake"	-	I Was Dead for 7 Weeks in the City of Angels
2002	"Mystic Love"	-	It's Good to Be Me!
2003	"The Flame"	2	The Flame
2003	"Honest"	-	The Flame
2004	"Die for Rock & Roll"	-	The Flame
2004	"Mi Sombrero"	-	The Flame
2006	"Let Me Out"	1	Follow the City Lights
2007	"Do Ya"	1	Follow the City Lights
2007	"Keep On Moving"	-	Follow the City Lights
2007	"Soldier"	-	2
2008	"Serenade 07"	-	2
2010	"Dannayá"	31	I Ka Kené
2011	"Under your spell"	-	I Ka Kené
2012	"What Goes Around Comes Around"	-	What Goes Around Comes Around
2015	"Too Late"	-	Complications
2015	"Sisters of Mercy"	-	Complications

== Music videos ==
Year	Title	Director
1995	Come with Me	Juan Bullón
1997	Serenade	Juan Bullón
1997	Loli Jackson	Juan Bullón
1999	DJ	Scott Marshall
1999	Cherry Lee	Scott Marshall
1999	Flashback	Scott Marshall
1999	Far	Scott Marshall
2001	The Hitter	Scott Marshall
2001	King George	Scott Marshall
2001	The Weak Hour of the Rooster	-
2001	Better Day	-
2003	The Flame	-
2003	Honest	-
2004	Die for Rock & Roll	-
2006	Let Me Out	Struendo Filmmakers
2006	Do Ya	Struendo Filmmakers
2006	Keep On Moving	Struendo Filmmakers
2007	Soldier	Struendo Filmmakers
2010	Dannayá	Struendo Filmmakers
2011	Under Your Spell	Marc Lozano
2012	What Goes Around Comes Around	Luis Germanó
2015	Too Late	Luis Germanó
2015	Sisters of Mercy	Mauri D. Galiano
