= Oh! Mother Russia =

Greatest hits album by Dover
- Released: 23 November 2005
- Recorded: 1999–2003
- Genre: Rock
- Length: 38:03
- Label: Solitary Man Records

Dover chronology
The Flame (2003)	Oh! Mother Russia (2005)	Follow The City Lights (2006)

Oh! Mother Russia is a compilation album by the Spanish rock band Dover. It was released in Japan on 23 November 2005, under a German-Japanese independent record label, Solitary Man Records.

This collection spans 4 years of songs from the albums Late at Night (1999), I Was Dead for 7 Weeks in the City of Angels (2001) and The Flame (2003).

== Track listing ==
All tracks are written by Amparo Llanos and Cristina Llanos

No.	Title	Length
1.	"My Secret People"	4:25
2.	"The Flame"	2:24
3.	"King George"	2:57
4.	"Big Mistake"	3:45
5.	"27 Years"	2:13
6.	"Better Day"	3:17
7.	"Leave Me Alone"	2:35
8.	"Weak Hour of the Rooster"	4:33
9.	"D.J."	3:14
10.	"Mi Sombrero"	2:42
11.	"My Fault"	2:26
12.	"Cherry Lee"	3:32
Total length:		38:03

== Personnel ==
Dover

- Cristina Llanos – vocals and guitar
- Amparo Llanos – guitar
- Jesús Antúnez – drums
- Álvaro Díez – bass guitar
