= 2 (Dover album) =

Greatest hits album by Dover
- Released: 27 November 2007
- Recorded: 1997–2007
- Genre: Electropop, alternative rock
- Length: 95:18
- Label: Capitol-EMI
- Producer: Daniel Alcover

Dover chronology
| Follow the City Lights (2006) | 2 (2007) | I Ka Kené (2010) |

Singles from 2
- 1. "Soldier" Released: 2007; 2. "Serenade 07" Released: 2008

2 is a compilation album of songs by the Spanish band Dover, released in 2007. It is a double CD greatest hits compilation from the band including singles "Serenade", "Devil Came to Me" and "Loli Jackson" and featuring many singles and favourites from their past albums.

The CD also includes a new single, "Soldier", and pop versions of five of their greatest hits and successes from their previous album Follow the City Lights.

== Track listing ==
All tracks are written by Amparo Llanos and Cristina Llanos

CD 1
| No. | Title | Length |
|---|---|---|
| 1. | "Serenade" | 3:54 |
| 2. | "Loli Jackson" | 3:26 |
| 3. | "Devil Came to Me" | 4:36 |
| 4. | "Judas" | 3:58 |
| 5. | "Cherry Lee" | 3:32 |
| 6. | "DJ" | 3:13 |
| 7. | "Flashback" | 3:16 |
| 8. | "The Hitter" | 2:41 |
| 9. | "Far" | 3:12 |
| 10. | "King George" | 2:55 |
| 11. | "The Weak Hour of the Rooster" | 4:29 |
| 12. | "Better Day" | 3:16 |
| 13. | "The Flame" | 2:22 |
| 14. | "Mi Sombrero" | 2:41 |
| Total length: | | 47:31 |

CD 2
| No. | Title | Length |
|---|---|---|
| 1. | "Soldier" | 3:19 |
| 2. | "Serenade 07" | 4:11 |
| 3. | "DJ Push It" | 4:42 |
| 4. | "Cherry Lee 07" | 4:13 |
| 5. | "King George 07" | 4:16 |
| 6. | "Devil Came to Me 07" | 6:10 |
| 7. | "Let Me Out" | 4:20 |
| 8. | "Keep On Moving" | 3:24 |
| 9. | "Do Ya" | 3:00 |
| 10. | "Tonight" | 3:59 |
| 11. | "Let Me Out (Spam Remix)" | 6:13 |
| Total length: | | 47:47 |

== Personnel ==
- Cristina Llanos – vocals, acoustic guitar
- Amparo Llanos – guitar
- Jesús Antúnez – drums
- Samuel Titos – bass guitar

== Charts ==
| Chart (2007) | Peak position |
|---|---|
| Spanish Album Charts | 30 |
