= It's Good to Be Me! =

EP by Dover
- Released: 8 July 2002
- Genre: Rock, acoustic rock
- Length: 21:54
- Label: Capitol-EMI, Chrysalis
- Producer: Dover

Dover chronology
I Was Dead for 7 Weeks in the City of Angels (2001)	It's Good to Be Me! (2002)	The Flame (2003)

Singles from It's Good to Be Me!
- 1. "Mystic Love" Released: June 2002

It's Good to Be Me! is the first EP by the Spanish rock band Dover. It was released on 8 July 2002 through EMI Odeon and Chrysalis Records. It contains one unreleased song, five live versions (recorded on 19 May 2002 in Getafe, Madrid) and two acoustic versions.

== Track listing ==
Lyrics and music by Amparo Llanos and Cristina Llanos except for the Screaming Trees song "Witness" that was composed by Van Conner, Gary Lee Conner, and Mark Lanegan.

No.	Title	Length
1.	"Mystic Love" (previously unreleased)	2:00
2.	"My Secret People" (live)	4:22
3.	"Better Day" (live)	3:16
4.	"Recluser" (live)	3:23
5.	"King George" (live)	3:11
6.	"Witness" (live)	3:45
7.	"Better Day" (acoustic)	3:34
8.	"The Weak Hour of the Rooster" (acoustic)	4:45
Total length:		21:54

Video album
No.	Title	Length
1.	"King George"	2:54
2.	"The Weak Hour of the Rooster"	4:31
3.	"Better Day"	3:16
Total length:		10:41

== Personnel ==
Dover

- Cristina Llanos – vocals and acoustic guitar
- Amparo Llanos – guitar
- Álvaro Díez – bass guitar
- Jesús Antúnez – drums
