= Stop the Clocks (disambiguation) =

Stop the Clocks is a 2006 greatest hits album by Oasis.

Stop the Clocks may also refer to:

- "Stop the Clocks" (song), an unreleased Oasis song, later covered by Noel Gallagher's High Flying Birds in 2011
- "Stop the Clocks", a 2008 Donots song from Coma Chameleon
- "Stop the Clocks", a 2012 Leona Lewis song from Glassheart
- "Stop the Clocks", a 2019 Enter Shikari song

== See also ==
- "Stop the Clock", a 2019 James Blunt song from Once Upon a Mind
