= Solitary Man =

Solitary Man may refer to:

- Solitary Man (novel), a novel based on the U.S. television series Angel
- Solitary Man (film), a 2009 film with Michael Douglas
- "Solitary Man" (song), a 1966 song by Neil Diamond
- Solitary Man Records, a German-Japanese independent record label
- American III: Solitary Man, an album by Johnny Cash
- Solitary Men, a 1983 album by Giorgio Moroder and Joe Esposito
