= Devil Came to Me =

Devil Came to Me may refer to:

- Devil Came to Me (album), a 1997 album by Dover
- "Devil Came to Me" (song), a 1997 song by Dover
