= Complications (Dover album) =

Studio album by Dover
- Released: 9 February 2015
- Recorded: July–September 2014
- Studio: Estudios Reno (Madrid, Spain)
- Genre: Rock, pop
- Length: 32:43
- Label: Octubre, Sony Music Spain
- Producer: Dover, Jesús Antúnez

Dover chronology
I Ka Kené (2010)	Complications (2015)

Singles from Complications
- 1. "Too Late" Released: 12 January 2015; 2. "Sisters of Mercy" Released: 15 June 2015

Complications is the eighth and final studio album by Spanish rock band Dover, produced by Jesús Antúnez and published by Sony Music Spain on 9 February 2015.

After a record break of five years since I Ka Kené, published in 2010, the Madrid band released a new album that left aside the electronic sound of their previous two albums to return to their rock roots. As pointed out by their label, Sony Music, it is a total of ten songs "inspired by their favorite bands ever, but with tons of charisma." The album features heavy use of autotune and religious references in songs like "Sisters Of Mercy" which may be a callback to the album Devil Came To Me but with a different perspective than what was on that album.

== Track listing ==
All tracks are written by Amparo Llanos and Cristina Llanos

Standard edition
No.	Title	Length
1.	"Too Late"	2:48
2.	"Complications"	3:13
3.	"Four to the Floor"	3:51
4.	"Crash"	2:21
5.	"Mystified"	2:37
6.	"Sisters of Mercy"	3:11
7.	"Like a Man"	2:22
8.	"New Wave Mechanics"	3:11
9.	"Tragedy"	3:59
10.	"Building a Fire"	2:39
Total length:		30:12

Spotify bonus tracks
No.	Title	Length
11.	"There Is a Place"	3:12

== Personnel ==
- Cristina Llanos – Vocals and acoustic guitar
- Amparo Llanos – Guitar
- Samuel Titos – Bass guitar
- Jesús Antúnez – Drums

== Charts ==
Chart (2015)	Peak position
Spanish Album Charts	20
