= Serenade (Dover song) =

Single by Dover

from the album Devil Came to Me
- B-side: "Devil Came to Me"
- Released: 21 April 1997
- Recorded: February 1997
- Studio: Infinity Studios, Madrid
- Genre: Rock; grunge
- Length: 3:54
- Label: Subterfuge
- Songwriter(s): Cristina Llanos
- Producer(s): Dover

Dover singles chronology
"Serenade" (1997)	"Loli Jackson" (1997)

"Serenade" is a song by the Spanish rock band Dover. Written by Cristina Llanos, the track was released in 1997 as the first single from the band's second studio album, Devil Came to Me (1997). This song was the first single that also became his first number one because of its rhythms and catchy chorus. It is the most chanted song in their concerts, making it an anthem for this group.

== Curiosities ==
The singer, guitarist and composer of the theme, Cristina Llanos, admits it's the most personal song she ever wrote. She is usually very shy and reserved and wanted to talk about it in this song, "asking" help to stop being so.

== Appearances ==
- Serenade was chosen for the video game SingStar Rocks!, among other songs by Spanish and international groups.
- In 2008, a remix of the song, "Serenade 07", became a single in the album 2.

== Music video ==
The music video for this song was made by Juan Bullón, a friend of the band with whom they previously worked in the video for "Come with Me" from the first album "Sister".

== Track listing ==
All tracks are written by Cristina Llanos

No.	Title	Length
1.	"Serenade"	3:54
2.	"Devil Came to Me"	4:36
Total length:		8:30
