= Donots =

German punk rock band

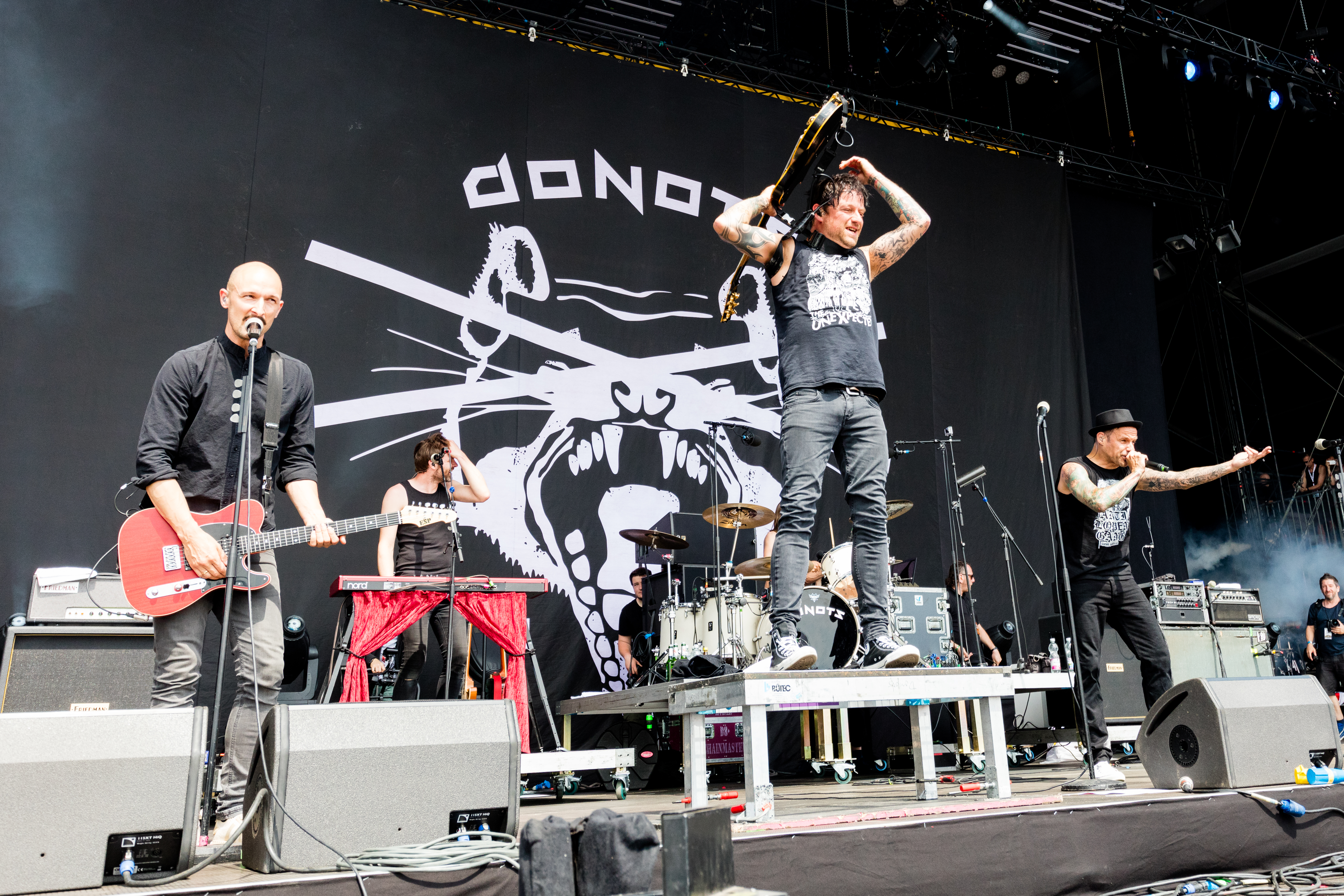
- Donots at Rock am Ring 2017

Background information
- Origin: Ibbenbüren, Germany
- Genres: Punk rock; pop punk
- Years active: 1993–present
- Labels: Headshock Records (1995–1998); GUN Records (1999–2007); Solitary Man Records (2008–present); OK!Good Records (2010–present); Vertigo Records (2012–2015)
- Members: Ingo Knollmann; Guido Knollmann; Jan Dirk Poggemann; Alex Siedenbiedel; Eike Herwig
- Website: Official website

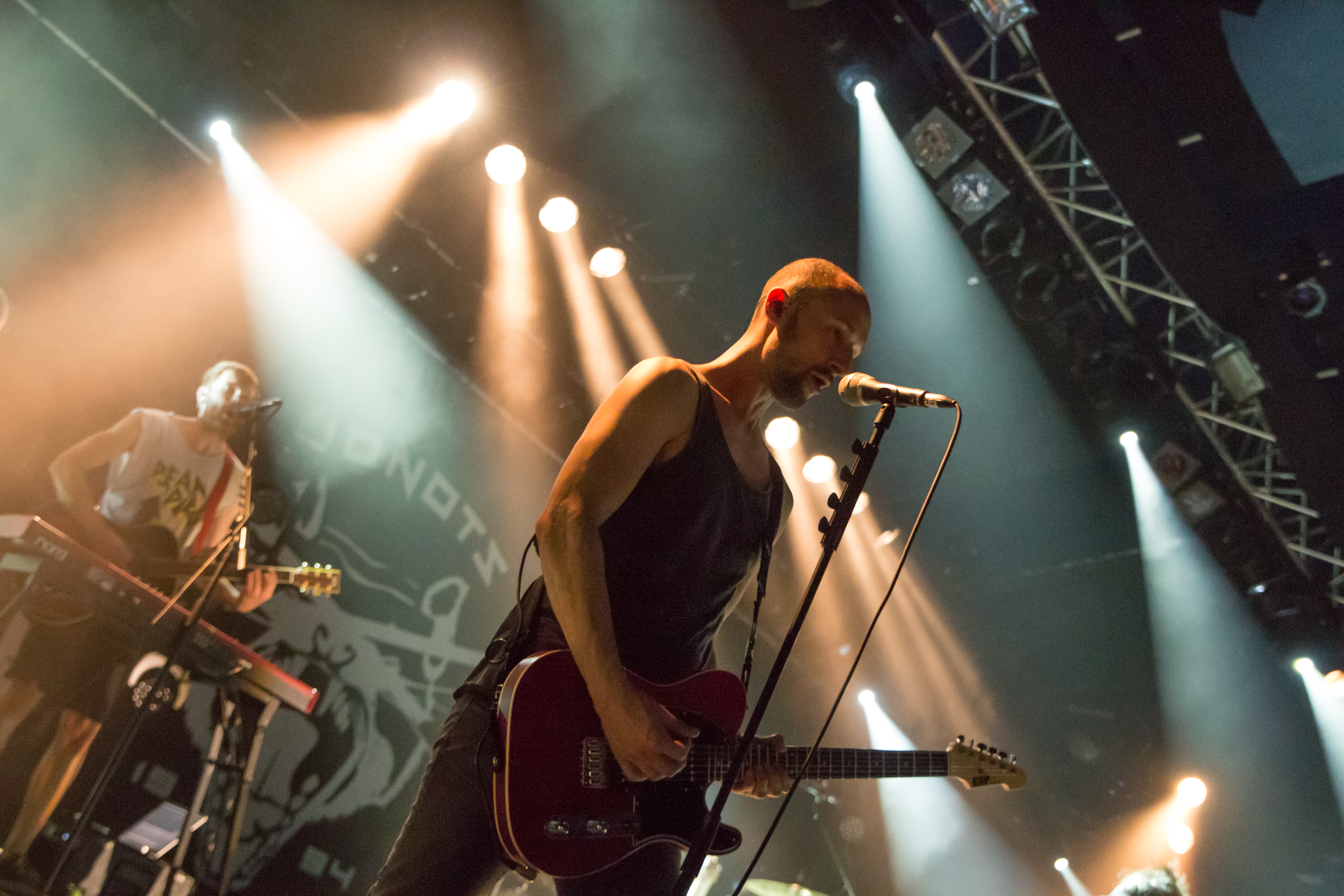
Alex Siedenbiedel at the 33rd Zelt-Musik-Festival Freiburg Germany 2015

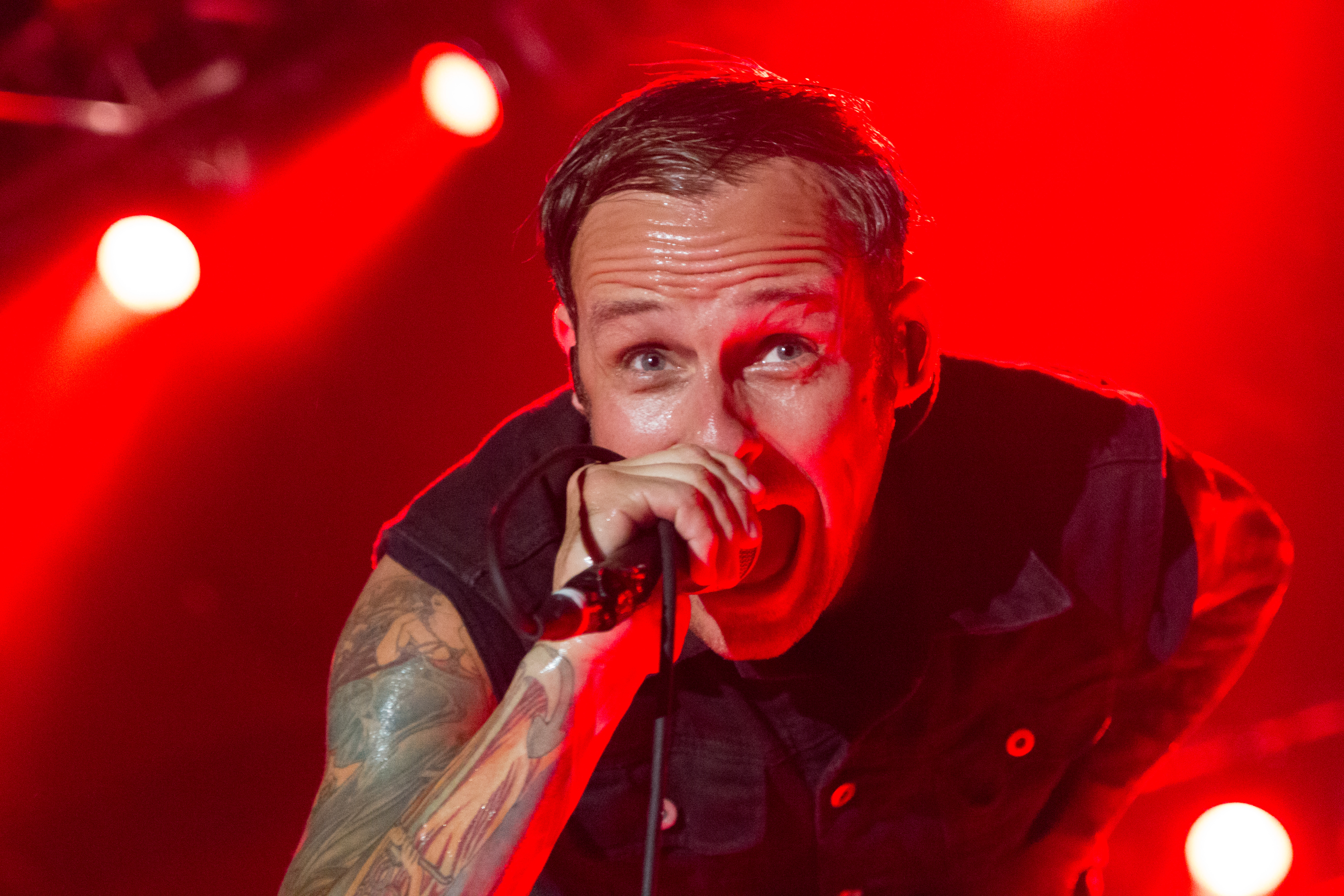
Ingo Knollmann at the 33rd Zelt-Musik-Festival Freiburg Germany 2015

The Donots are a German punk rock band from Germany, formed in 1993 in Ibbenbüren.

== Band history ==
=== Early years (1993–1998) ===
The Donots were founded in 1993 by Ingo Knollmann on lead vocals, his brother Guido Knollmann on guitar, Jan-Dirk Poggemann on bass, Jens "Stone" Grimstein on guitar and Jens Trippner on drums. They celebrated their stage debut on April 16, 1994, at the Scheune in their hometown Ibbenbüren. They began playing as a support band in local venues and released the demo tapes We Do Not Care So Why Should You? and Mellow D's and Harm on E's in 1994 and 1995, respectively. Drummer Jens Trippner was replaced by Eike Herwig in 1995.

In 1996, the band released their debut album Pedigree Punk via independent label Headshock Records and shortly afterwards, Alex Siedenbiedel replaced Stone Grimstein on guitar, finalizing the current line-up. They played support shows in Germany for Green Day, Blink-182, Propagandhi, No Fun At All, Terrorgruppe and No Use for a Name.

The band released their second album Tonight's Karaoke Contest Winners in spring of 1998, followed by their first tour with Samiam and ErrorType:11. That year they also won a band contest at the Bizarre Festival, which furthered their popularity in the German underground scene, leading to them getting signed by major label GUN Records (Sony BMG).

=== Mainstream breakthrough (1999–2007) ===
The Donots released their third album and first major label release Better Days Not Included in 1999, produced by Die Ärzte producer Uwe Hoffmann, together with their first single "Outshine the World", which received minor radio and TV airplay. They went on to play their first co-headlining tour called "Ladies First, James Last" across Germany, Austria, Italy and the Netherlands, together with fellow German punk rock peers the Beatsteaks.

In 2001, the band released their fourth album Pocketrock, with which they achieved their breakthrough into the mainstream, mainly through their hit single "Whatever Happened to the 80s", which reached No. 67 on the German charts. The following singles "Room With a View", "Today" and "Superhero" also received video airplay on MTV. They played their first headlining tour through Germany, Austria and Switzerland with Midtown as support. The following year, Pocketrock was re-released through Burning Heart Records all over Europe.

The band released their fifth album Amplify the Good Times in May 2002, which achieved similar success with the singles "Saccharine Smile" and "Big Mouth". After the album's release, they played a European tour with Millencolin and Anti-Flag. In September, they released a cover version of "We're Not Gonna Take It" by Twisted Sister on an EP, which turned out to be one of the band's biggest hits, reaching No. 33 on the German charts. This was followed by the "Amplify the Good Tour" with Favez as support through Germany, Austria, Switzerland, Italy, France, and Spain.

In 2003, Amplify the Good Times became a surprise hit in Japan, with the album reaching No. 10 on the International Album Charts and the singles receiving heavy radio airplay, with "Saccharine Smile" reaching No. 19 on the Oricon Singles Chart. The band and "Saccharine Smile" would receive further international recognition when the song appeared in the acclaimed 2004 racing video game Burnout 3: Takedown. The band played their first Japan tour in June 2003. Shortly afterwards, "Saccharine Smile" was featured in Konami's GuitarFreaks and DrumMania arcade rhythm game series. That year they also recorded the "Protest Song" with Anti-Flag, which was released as a bonus track on The Terror State.

The Donots released their sixth album Got the Noise in 2004 with the accompanying singles "We Got the Noise" and "Goodbye Routine"; the former was another big hit, landing on No. 33 in Germany while being the intro theme for MVP Baseball 2005. The band was also featured on the Fat Wreck Chords compilation Rock Against Bush, Vol. 2 with their b-side "Time's Up". In 2005, they released their first DVD "Ten Years of Noise".

In 2006, the band left their major label due to creative differences. Guitarist Guido explained: "Over time we fought each other more and more, rather than looking for solutions together. We simply did not understand each other anymore. The last record was actually just damage control. Even during promotional activities, we were absolutely not on the same wavelength. Especially with video clips, selection of singles and the entire image of the band." The band released the greatest hits and b-side compilation album The Story So Far: Ibbtown Chronicles as a send-off to their major label. That year they also founded Solitary Man Records.

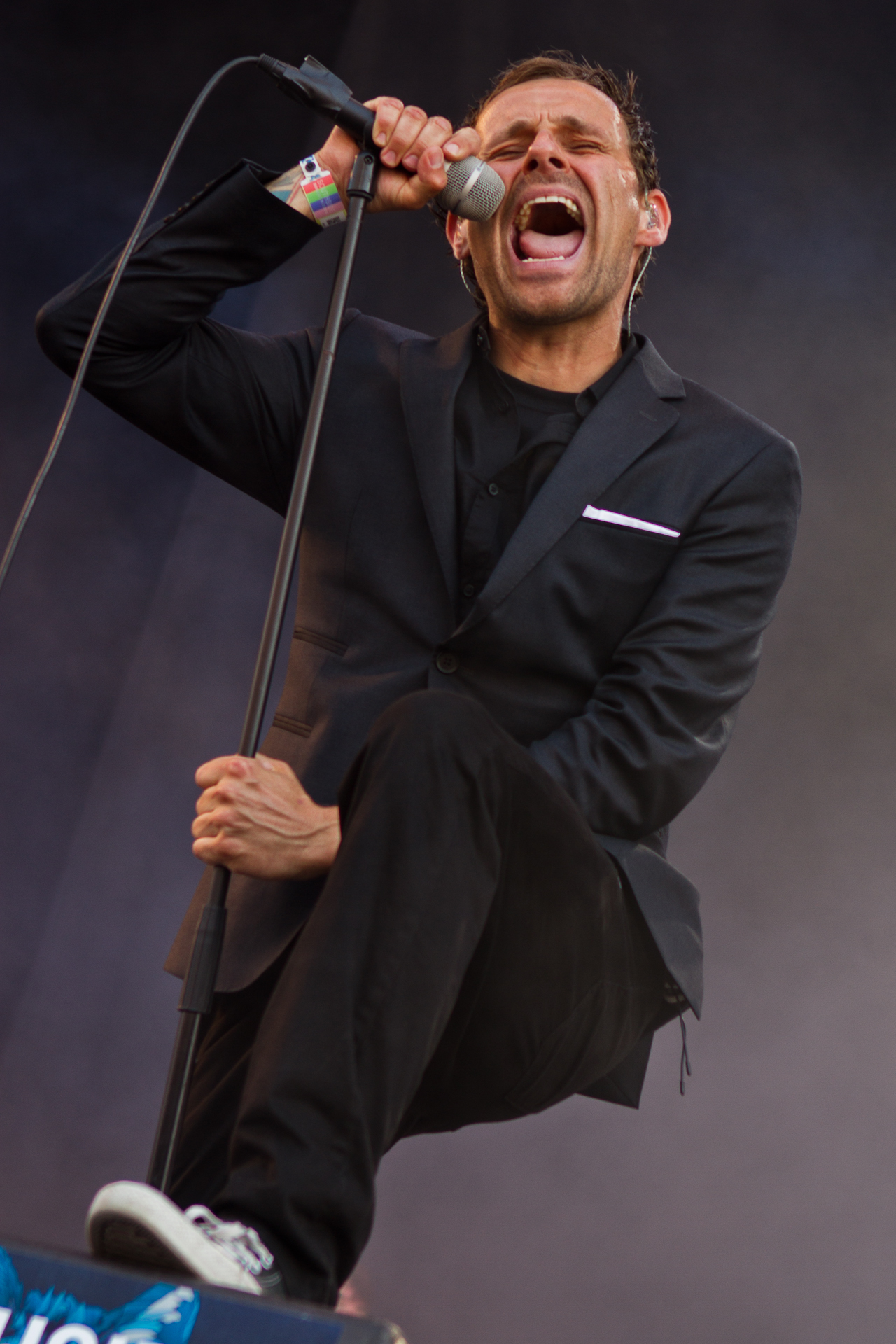
Ingo Knollmann at Southside Festival 2014

=== Solitary Man Records and further success (2008–2013) ===
After a short hiatus, they released their seventh album Coma Chameleon through their own label Solitary Man Records in March 2008. The album marked a change of sound for the band, evolving the pop punk sound of their previous albums to a darker, heavier alternative rock and punk rock-influenced sound. The band returned to mainstream success with the alternative rock single "Stop the Clocks", which received major radio airplay and was nominated for the German music award "1LIVE Krone" for Best Single. The band played their first headlining tour in four years with Disco Ensemble in spring and American Steel and Fire in the Attic in autumn. In 2009, they released the "To Hell With Love" EP in the UK. Later that year, they supported Die Toten Hosen on their "Machmalauter Tour" and released their first live DVD "To Hell With Live".

The Donots released their eighth studio album The Long Way Home in 2010, with the successful singles "Calling" and "Forever Ends Today". That year, they supported Green Day on all German dates of their 21st Century Breakdown World Tour, resulting in a major popularity boost for the band. A special international edition of the album was released in September in the UK via Lockjaw Records and in November in the US via OK!Good Records. "The Long Way Home Tour" took place in autumn 2010 with Royal Republic as support, which culminated in their first "Grand Münster Slam" at Halle Münsterland, which was their biggest headlining show of their career at that point, playing in front of 3,000 people.

In 2012, they released their ninth album Wake the Dogs, which was collaboratively released by Solitary Man Records and Vertigo Records (Universal Music). It was the band's first Top 10 album, reaching No. 6 in Germany. In summer 2012, they played the Center Stage of Germany's biggest festivals Rock am Ring and Rock im Park for the first time. They supported the album with the "Wake the Dogs Tour" in autumn 2012 with Atlas Losing Grip and Nothington. The album resulted in three singles, "Come Away With Me", "You're So Yesterday" and "So Long", which featured a guest appearance by Frank Turner.

In 2013, the band went on their first US tour, playing the East Coast with Flogging Molly and Mariachi El Bronx and the West Coast with Anti-Flag and C.J. Ramone. The tour was filmed and released as the documentary and live album "Wake the States".

=== German songwriting and recent activity (2014–present) ===
The band celebrated their 20th anniversary in April 2014 with the single "Das Neue bleibt beim Alten" ("The new stays old") featuring Tim McIlrath from Rise Against, the very first Donots song in German including McIlrath singing his part in German as well. They also participated in the German re-recording of "Do They Know It's Christmas?", which reached No. 1 in Germany. In December 2014, they played their biggest headlining show of their career yet in front of 6,500 people.

Because of the positive response of the 20th anniversary single, they decided to record an entire album in German. Their tenth studio album Karacho ("noise" or "crash") was released in February 2015 along with its lead single "Ich mach nicht mehr mit" ("I won't take part in this anymore"). The album reached No. 5 at the German album charts, the band's highest-charting position yet. The "Karacho Tour" was originally planned to take place in March, but had to be postponed to November 2015 because of an injury by drummer Eike. The band returned to Japan in May 2015, where they released an English version of the album titled ¡Carajo!.

The Donots participated in the Bundesvision Song Contest 2015, representing their state North Rhine-Westphalia. They reached second place with their song "Dann ohne mich" ("Then without me"), which attacks right-wing organizations such as Pegida and addresses the resurgence of right-wing mindsets in the German public because of the European migrant crisis. They celebrated their 1000th concert in December 2016.

The band released their eleventh studio album and second German-language release in January 2018, Lauter als Bomben ("Louder than bombs"), along with a live DVD of their 1000th concert, followed by an extensive two-year tour.

Shortly after the tour, the Donots celebrated their 25th anniversary with a compilation called Silverhochzeit ("Silver marriage"), released in July 2019. They also did a Anniversary Tour called "25th Birthday Slam", that was released as a CD and called "Birthday Slams" later in 2020. According to the Band, its their first official Live Album

After a hiatus because of the COVID-19 pandemic, the Band played their first public show since 2019 at the Rock Am Ring Festival 2022. Campino from Die Toten Hosen made a Guest appearance there. Also on that show, Donots premiered a new song that would be included on their new album Heut ist ein guter Tag ("Today is a good day"), releasing on February 10.

== Band members ==
Current members

- Ingo Knollmann – lead vocals (1993–present)
- Guido Knollmann – guitar, vocals (1993–present)
- Jan-Dirk "Purgen" Poggemann – bass, vocals (1993–present)
- Eike Herwig – drums, percussion (1995–present)
- Alex Siedenbiedel – guitar, vocals (1996–present)

Touring members

- Robin Völkert – keyboard, guitar, backing vocals (2011–2017)

Former members

- Jens "Stone" Grimstein – guitar (1993–1996)
- Jens Trippner – drums, percussion (1993–1995)

== Discography ==
The official discography consists of ten studio albums, two compilation albums, thirteen singles and nineteen music videos.

Donots discography
- Studio albums: 11
- Compilation albums: 2
- Singles: 13
- Music videos: 19

=== Albums ===
| Title | Album details | Chart peaks | | | Certifications (sales thresholds) |
| Title | Album details | GER | AUT | JPN | Certifications (sales thresholds) |
|---|---|---|---|---|---|
| Pedigree Punk | Released: 1996; Label: n/a; Format: CD | — | — | — | |
| Tonight's Karaoke-Contest Winners | Released: 1998; Label: Headshock; Format: CD | — | — | — | |
| Better Days Not Included | Released: 7 June 1999; Label: GUN Records / BMG; Format: CD, digital download | — | — | — | |
| Pocketrock | Released: 8 January 2001; Label: GUN Records / Burning Heart; Format: CD, digital download | 31 | — | — | |
| Amplify the Good Times | Released: 17 June 2002; Label: GUN Records / BMG; Format: CD, LP, digital download | 18 | 45 | 51 | |
| Got the Noise | Released: 21 June 2004; Label: GUN Records / Sony BMG; Format: CD, LP, digital download | 17 | 39 | 42 | |
| Coma Chameleon | Released: 28 March 2008; Label: Solitary Man Records; Format: CD, LP, digital download | 41 | — | 135 | |
| The Long Way Home | Released: 26 March 2010; Label: Solitary Man Records; Format: CD, LP, digital download | 24 | — | — | |
| Wake the Dogs | Released: 27 April 2012; Label: Solitary Man Records; Format: CD, LP, digital download | 6 | 32 | — | |
| Karacho | Released: 20 February 2015; Label: Vertigo Berlin (Universal); Format: CD, LP, digital download | 5 | 40 | — | |
| Lauter als Bomben | Released: 12 January 2018; Label: Solitary Man Records; Format: CD, LP, digital download | 4 | 21 | — | |
| Heut ist ein guter Tag | Released: 3 February 2023; Label: Solitary Man Records; Format: CD, LP, digital download | 1 | — | — | |
"—" denotes a release that did not chart.

=== Compilation albums ===
| Title | Album details | Chart peaks |
| Title | Album details | GER |
|---|---|---|
| The Story So Far: Ibbtown Chronicles | Released: 24 November 2006; Label: Sony BMG; Format: CD, digital download | — |
| To Hell with Love | Released: 14 September 2009 (only UK); Label: Solitary Man Records; Format: CD, digital download | — |
| Silverhochzeit | Released: 12 July 2019; Label: Solitary Man Records; Format: CD, digital download | 6 |
"—" denotes a release that did not chart.

=== Split albums ===
| Title | Album details |
|---|---|
| Donots vs. Midtown | Released: 2001; Label: Bushido Records |

=== Exclusive compilation tracks ===
| Year | Track | Album details |
|---|---|---|
| 2001 | "Ausgebombt" | Aggropop Now!: Released: 4 April 2003; Label: Destiny Records |
| 2004 | "Time's Up" | Rock Against Bush, Vol. 2: Released: 9 August 2004; Label: Fat Wreck Chords |
| 2004 | "Ich töte meinen Nachbarn und verprügel seine Leiche" | Kunst! 20 Jahre die Kassierer: Released: 15 November 2005; Label: Teenage Rebel |

=== Singles ===
| Year | Title | Album | chart peaks |
| Year | Title | Album | GER |
|---|---|---|---|
| 1999 | "Outshine the World": Released: 1 March 1999 | Better Days Not Included | — |
| 2000 | "Whatever Happened to the 80's": Released: 25 September 2000 | Pocketrock | 67 |
| 2001 | "Superhero": Released: 2001 | Pocketrock | — |
| 2001 | "Today": Released: 2001 | Pocketrock | — |
| 2001 | "Room with a View": Released: 17 September 2001 | Pocketrock | 93 |
| 2002 | "Saccharine Smile": Released: 21 May 2002 | Amplify the Good Times | 77 |
| 2002 | "Big Mouth": Released: 15 July 2002 | Amplify the Good Times | — |
| 2002 | "We're Not Gonna Take It": Released: 30 September 2002 | Amplify the Good Times | 33 |
| 2004 | "We Got the Noise": Released: 1 June 2004 | Got the Noise | 33 |
| 2004 | "Good-Bye Routine": Released: 13 September 2004 | Got the Noise | 92 |
| 2008 | "Stop the Clocks": Released: 13 June 2008 | Coma Chameleon | 50 |
| 2010 | "Calling": Released: 12 March 2010 | The Long Way Home | 75 |
| 2010 | "Forever Ends Today": Released: 28 May 2010 | The Long Way Home | — |

== Videography ==
| Year | Album details | Certifications (sales thresholds) |
|---|---|---|
| 2005 | Ten Years of Noise: Released: January 31, 2005; Label: Gun Records / Sony BMG | |
| 2009 | To Hell with Live: Released: December 18, 2009; Label: Solitary Man Records | |

=== Music videos ===
| Year | Song | Director | Song from | Video appears on |
|---|---|---|---|---|
| 1999 | "Outshine the World" | | Better Days Not Included | Ten Years of Noise |
| 2000 | "Whatever Happened to the 80s" | | Pocketrock | Ten Years of Noise |
| 2001 | "Superhero" | | Pocketrock | Ten Years of Noise |
| 2001 | "Today" | | Pocketrock | Ten Years of Noise |
| 2001 | "Room with a View (Give Me Shelter...)" | | Pocketrock | Ten Years of Noise |
| 2002 | "Saccharine Smile" | | Amplify the Good Times | Ten Years of Noise |
| 2002 | "Big Mouth" | | Amplify the Good Times | Ten Years of Noise |
| 2002 | "We're Not Gonna Take It" | | Amplify the Good Times | Ten Years of Noise |
| 2004 | "We Got the Noise" | | Got the Noise | Ten Years of Noise |
| 2004 | "Good-Bye Routine" | | Got the Noise | Ten Years of Noise |
| 2008 | "Pick Up the Pieces" | | Coma Chameleon | |
| 2008 | "Break My Stride" | Magnus Härdner | Coma Chameleon | To Hell with Love |
| 2008 | "Stop the Clocks" | Magnus Härdner | Coma Chameleon | To Hell with Love |
| 2008 | "The Right Kind of Wrong" | Magnus Härdner | Coma Chameleon | To Hell with Love |
| 2008 | "New Hope for the Dead" | | Coma Chameleon | To Hell with Love |
| 2010 | "Calling" | Magnus Härdner | The Long Way Home | |
| 2010 | "Forever Ends Today" | Johannes Timpernagel, Robert Pohle | The Long Way Home | |
| 2010 | "Dead Man Walking" | Magnus Härdner | The Long Way Home | |
| 2010 | "Let It Go" | Magnus Härdner | The Long Way Home | |
