= Follow the City Lights =

Studio album by Dover
- Released: 2 October 2006
- Recorded: May–June 2006
- Studio: PKO Studios (Madrid, Spain)
- Genre: Electropop
- Length: 33:21
- Label: Capitol-EMI
- Producer: Daniel Alcover

Dover chronology
Oh! Mother Russia (2005)	Follow the City Lights (2006)	2 (2007)

Singles from Follow the City Lights
- 1. "Let Me Out" Released: 18 October 2006; 2. "Do Ya" Released: March 2007; 3. "Keep On Moving" Released: July 2007

Follow the City Lights is the sixth album by Spanish rock band Dover. In contrast to previous releases, the album has an electronic character.

Cristina Llanos, Amparo Llanos and programmer and drummer Jesús Antúnez were joined by Samuel Titos, a newly signed bassist for the band. Daniel Alcover, with whom they had already worked with on Devil Came to Me, mastered the album and later won a Music Prize for Best Sound Technician for the album.

The music style shift led to the resignation of some fans. The album reached No. 1 in Spanish sales for several weeks and their first single "Let Me Out" reached the top of the charts. The album won the Best Alternative Album award at the Music Awards 2006. It was followed by the singles "Do Ya" and "Keep On Moving".

The song "Do Ya" is featured in the soundtrack of football video game FIFA 08.

== Track listing ==
Lyrics and music by Amparo Llanos and Cristina Llanos.

No.	Title	Length
1.	"Let Me Out"	4:23
2.	"Do Ya"	2:59
3.	"Keep On Moving"	3:26
4.	"Salvation"	3:42
5.	"You & Me"	3:37
6.	"Tonight"	4:01
7.	"Dear Mc Cartney"	1:58
8.	"Madrid"	2:52
9.	"Denial"	3:40
10.	"Shine on Me"	2:43
Total length:		33:21

== Personnel ==
Dover

- Cristina Llanos – vocals and acoustic guitar
- Amparo Llanos – guitar
- Jesús Antúnez – drums
- Samuel Titos – bass guitar

== Accolades ==
Year	Ceremony	Category	Work	Result
2007	Premios de la Música	Best Album	"Follow the City Lights"	Nominated
2007	Premios de la Música	Best Alternative Pop Album	"Follow the City Lights"	Won
2007	Premios de la Música	Best Artistic Production	Daniel Alcover	Nominated
2007	Premios de la Música	Best Music Video	"Let Me Out"	Won
2007	Premios de la Música	Best Song	"Let Me Out"	Nominated
2007	Premios de la Música	Best Sound Technician - Daniel Alcover		Won

== Charts ==
Chart (2006)	Peak position
Spanish Album Charts	4
