= Coma Chameleon =

Studio album by Donots
- Released: March 28, 2008 (EU)
- Genres: Alternative rock; punk rock; pop punk
- Label: Solitary Man Records
- Producers: Kurt Ebelhauser, Vincent Sorg

Donots chronology
Got the Noise (2004)	Coma Chameleon (2008)	The Long Way Home (2010)

Professional ratings
Review scores
Source	Rating
Sputnikmusic	link

Coma Chameleon is a 2008 album by the German punk rock band Donots. Stylistically, the album marks a notable shift from the bands pop punk and punk rock roots (which are still present on some songs) towards a more mature, melancholic alternative rock sound. Singer Ingo Knollmann described the shift in an interview where he labelled Coma Chameleon as the first album of "Donots 2.0".

== Track listing ==
1. "There's a Tunnel at the End of the Light" (Intro)
2. "Break My Stride"
3. "Pick Up the Pieces"
4. "Headphones"
5. "New Hope for the Dead"
6. "Anything"
7. "To Hell with Love"
8. "Stop the Clocks"
9. "The Right Kind of Wrong"
10. "This Is Not a Drill"
11. "Killing Time"
12. "Somewhere Someday"

== Bonus tracks ==
- "City Lights" (Japanese bonus track)
- "Second Best" (iTunes bonus track)
- "Your Life Without You" (exclusive bonus track) – When Coma Chameleon was newly released, the Donots spread the word that everyone who would send in a picture of himself with the new record would get called by a member of the band. They also sent all these people the track "Your Life Without You" via email.

"Drag the River" was originally meant to be a bonus track at a German digital download site, but was changed at the last minute to be "City Lights". "Drag the River" and "Let Me Let You Down" have since been released on the Stop the Clocks EP on June 6, 2008.

== Singles ==
On February 14, 2008, the band premiered "Break My Stride" on their MySpace page as a Valentine's Day present. On March 21, a week before the CD's release date, the band made "Headphones" available to download from their MySpace. "Stop the Clocks" is the second official single from the album, "Break My Stride" being the first. In 2007 the band played the video of "Break My Stride" on German television channel GIGA TV.
