= Got the Noise =

Studio album by Donots
- Released: June 24, 2004 (US)
- Genre: Punk rock; pop punk
- Label: Supersonic/GUN/BMG
- Producer: Fabio Trentini

Donots chronology
Amplify the Good Times (2002)	Got the Noise (2004)	Coma Chameleon (2008)

Got the Noise is a 2004 album by the German punk rock band Donots. It features guest appearances from members of UK punk rockers 3 Colours Red and A.

The song "We Got the Noise" is featured in the video games MVP Baseball 2005 and Need for Speed: Underground Rivals. It was the intro theme for the former, with sports music blog Scores and Chords calling it a "perfect backdrop when playing the mini-games or building your franchise in dynasty mode."

All songs composed by the Donots. All lyrics by Ingo Donot.

== Track listing ==
1. "We Got the Noise" – 3:46
2. "Knowledge" – 2:57
3. "Wretched Boy" – 3:39
4. "It's Over" – 3:36
5. "Disappear" – 2:53
6. "Life Ain't Gonna Wait" 3:52
7. "Alright Now" – 3:20
8. "Good-Bye Routine" – 2:51
9. "Your Way Home" – 3:04
10. "The Jerk Parade" – 2:58
11. "Cough It Up" – 2:58
12. "Better Days (Not Included)" – 2:28
13. "Punchline" – 2:50
