= Pocket Rock =

Pocketrock

Studio album by Donots
- Released: January 8, 2001 (Europe); December 23, 2003 (US)
- Genre: Punk rock; pop punk
- Label: GUN/BMG International
- Producer: Fabio Trentini

Donots chronology
Better Days Not Included (1999)	Pocketrock (2001)	Amplify the Good Times (2002)

PocketRock is a 2001 (released in 2003 in the US) album by the German punk rock band Donots.

== Track listing ==
1. "I Quit"
2. "Whatever Happened to the 80s"
3. "Superhero"
4. "Today"
5. "Don't You Know"
6. "Room with a View"
7. "Watch You Fall"
8. "In Too Deep"
9. "Radio Days"
10. "Hot Rod"
11. "Jaded"
12. "At 23"
13. "Backstabbing" (bonus track)
14. "Hey Kids" (Internet bonus track)
