= Sister (Dover album) =

Studio album by Dover
- Released: 15 August 1995; 26 March 2001 (reissue)
- Recorded: July–August 1995
- Studio: Estudio La Nave (Madrid, Spain)
- Genre: Grunge; hard rock
- Length: 36:20 (original release); 38:47 (2001 reissue)
- Label: Everlasting-Caroline (original release); Chrysalis, Loli Jackson (2001 reissue)
- Producer: Amparo Llanos

Dover chronology
Sister (1995)	Devil Came to Me (1997)

Singles from Sister
- 1. "Angelus" Released: March 2001

Sister is the debut studio album by the Spanish rock band Dover. It was released on 15 August 1995 under the independent record company Everlasting-Caroline.

It was recorded between July and August 1995 at Estudio La Nave in Madrid. The record company, lacking resources, did little promotion for the album, which led to a complete failure to sell only 500 copies of an edition of 800, when his goal was to edit and sell 4,000. This was a big disappointment, but it allowed them to add performances (Festimad from 1996 to 1998, and Festival Internacional de Benicàssim in 1996).

Even with the disappointment of sales, they recorded their first video, Come with Me. Officially, the album had no single, but this song was the most demanded for at concerts by fans. The music video was recorded in a garage, with reduced budget, under the direction of Juan Bullón.

== Reissue ==
The album was reissued by Chrysalis on 26 March 2001. Besides having a new album cover and an internal booklet with pictures from the last tours, it contained a song that, in its day, could not enter the album because of publishing problems. It was "Noche Tras Noche", the only song that the band has recorded in Spanish. It is a cover version of the Spanish group Solera, that Dover used to play in their first concerts back in 1994.

One single, "Angelus", was released from this reissued album, which contained three songs: "Angelus" itself, "The Morning After", and the aforementioned "Noche Tras Noche".

== Appearances ==
The songs "Angelus" and "The Morning After" made appearance in the 2001 Spanish film "No te fallaré".

== Critical reception ==
Sister did not draw too much attention, and did not receive favorable reviews (nor unfavorable). BDF from LaFonoteca described it as a "debut in which the group is kind of laid down". BDF listed "Anacrusa", "Come with Me", "Grey" and "She Will" as great songs on this debut, and also points that, however, the tracks generally seem unfinished, with some of them that does not even reach a minute long.

== Track listing ==
All tracks are written by Amparo Llanos and Cristina Llanos, except where noted

No.	Title	Writer(s)	Length
1.	"Anacrusa"		1:36
2.	"Stamber"		2:26
3.	"El Perro Loco"		1:57
4.	"Grey"		2:34
5.	"Jane Below"		2:07
6.	"In Hole"		2:25
7.	"The Morning After"		2:41
8.	"She Will"		2:14
9.	"Her Bed Star"	Amparo Llanos, Cristina Llanos, Álvaro Gómez	2:54
10.	"La Turmis"		1:56
11.	"Angelus"		3:39
12.	"Distortion She"		1:36
13.	"Come With Me"		2:44
14.	"Three Cowboys"		0:57
15.	"Green"		2:07
Total length:			36:20

Reissue bonus tracks

No.	Title	Writer(s)	Length
16.	"Noche Tras Noche"	Rodrigo García Blanca, José María Guzmán González	2:27
Total length:			38:47

== Personnel ==
Dover

- Cristina Llanos – vocals and guitar
- Amparo Llanos – guitar
- Jesús Antúnez – drums
- Álvaro Gómez – bass

== Release history ==
Region	Date	Format	Label
Spain	15 August 1995	CD, LP	Everlasting-Caroline
Spain	26 March 2001	CD	Chrysalis, Loli Jackson
