= I Ka Kené =

Studio album by Dover
- Released: 4 October 2010
- Recorded: June–July 2010
- Studio: Estudios Reno (Madrid, Spain)
- Genre: Electropop, Ethnic
- Length: 32:43
- Label: Sony Music Spain
- Producer: Dover, Jesús Antúnez, Chris Lord-Alge

Dover chronology
2 (2007)	I Ka Kené (2010)	Complications (2015)

Singles from I Ka Kené
- 1. "Dannayá" Released: 31 July 2010; 2. "Under Your Spell" Released: 24 January 2011

I Ka Kené is the seventh album by the Madrid-based group Dover, released on 4 October 2010. The title translates to "Are you fine?" in the Bambara language.

The songs were composed between March 2009 and May 2010. The album itself was recorded and produced by Dover in Reno Studios in Madrid between June 7 and July 9, 2010. Five of the songs have been mixed by Chris Lord-Alge (who has worked with blink-182, Paramore and Simple Plan, among others) in Los Angeles, the rest having been mixed by Jesús Antúnez. The album was mastered by Ted Jensen. Dannayá, the first single, was pre-released on iTunes on July 31.

The 10 songs on the album are sung in a mixture of English, French and Bambara, all together lasting just over 30 minutes in length. In addition to a regular album, Dover has also released a special edition version that will include a vinyl album and a remix of "Dannaya" by Mexican Institute of Sound.

== Track listing ==
Lyrics and music by Amparo Llanos and Cristina Llanos.

Standard edition
No.	Title	Length
1.	"Dannayá"	3:07
2.	"Under Your Spell"	3:07
3.	"Any Love"	3:14
4.	"Junette"	3:22
5.	"Solitaire"	2:54
6.	"I Ka Kené"	2:59
7.	"La Réponse Divine"	2:15
8.	"Yafama"	4:43
9.	"A Bullet to the Heart"	3:48
10.	"Diaribi"	3:14
Total length:		32:43

In May 2011, Dover published I Ka Kené: The remixes, mostly remixes of "Dannayá", which was popular in some European countries. The album is published only in digital format.

Remixes
No.	Title	Writer(s)	Producer(s)	Length
1.	"Dannayá (Bodybangers Remix Edit)"		Bodybangers	3:34
2.	"Dannayá (Moonflowers Radio Remix)"		Moonflowers	3:34
3.	"Dannayá (Rolling Hackers Muscle Remix)"		Rolling Hackers	4:20
4.	"Dannayá (Future Presidentes Remix)"	C. Llanos, A. Llanos	Future Presidentes	3:01
5.	"Under Your Spell (Jp Candela Remix)"		JP Candela	4:55
6.	"Dannayá (J.W Rad Remix)"	C. Llanos, A. Llanos	J.W Rad	3:43
7.	"Dannayá (Eme Dj & Fiumichino Remix)"		Eme Dj & Fiumichino	6:26
8.	"Dannayá (Meneo Remix)"	C. Llanos, A. Llanos	Meneo	3:08
9.	"Under Your Spell (Macchio & Morita)"		Macchio & Morita	4:39
10.	"Dannayá (Instituto Mexicano del Sonido Remix)"		Instituto Mexicano del Sonido	2:59
11.	"Dannayá (Fizz Moon Remix)"		Fizz Moon	3:46
12.	"Under your spell (Oscar Salguero Remix)"		Oscar Salgguero	3:15
13.	"Dannayá (Dani Moreno Remix)"		Dani Moreno	3:36
14.	"Dannayá (Rolling Hackers Remix)"		Rolling Hackers	3:18
Total length:				54:14

== Personnel ==
Dover

- Cristina Llanos – Vocals and acoustic guitar
- Amparo Llanos – Guitar
- Samuel Titos – Bass guitar
- Jesús Antúnez – Drums

== Charts ==
Chart (2010)	Peak position
Spanish Album Charts	14
