= Amparo Llanos =

Spanish musician and songwriter

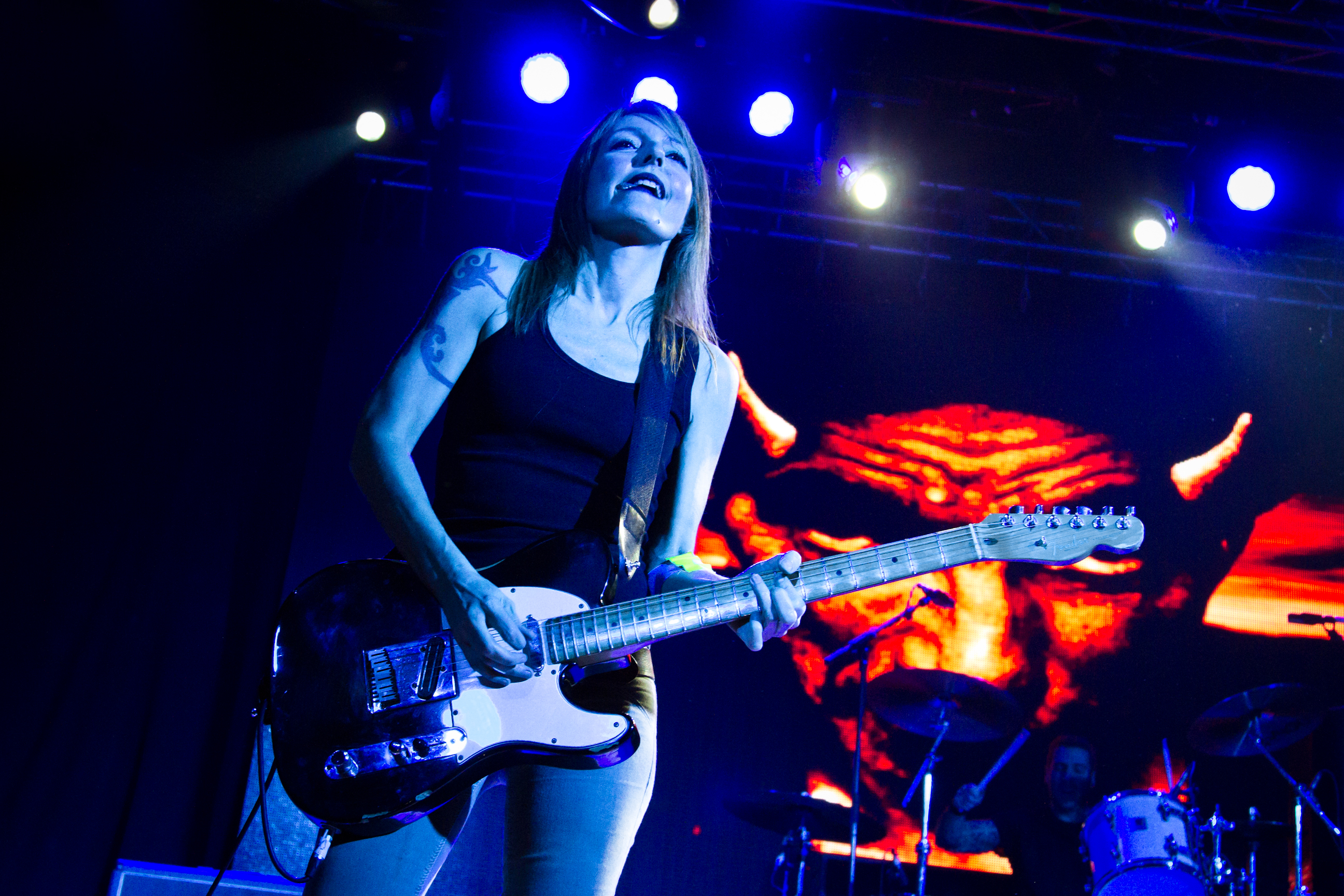
- Amparo Llanos, 2014

Background information
- Also known as: Amparo
- Born: Amparo Llanos Fayos; 27 May 1965 (age 60); Madrid
- Origin: Madrid, Spain
- Genres: Alternative rock; grunge; pop rock; electropop
- Occupations: Musician, songwriter, producer
- Instrument: Guitar
- Years active: 1992–present
- Labels: Subterfuge Records; Chrysalis Records; Loli Jackson Records; Capitol-EMI; Sony Music
- Website: www.dover.es

Amparo Llanos Fayos (born 27 May 1965) is a Spanish musician, guitarist and songwriter. She was the leader, along with her sister Cristina, of the Spanish rock band Dover.

== Biography ==
Before the foundation of the band, she worked in the shop of her mother in Majadahonda. She took a course in history and three of Journalism, but according to her, "I left it because I was too timid".

Her influences are The Beatles, R.E.M and Nirvana. Dover released his first album in 1995 ("Sister") with Amparo, her sister Cristina (vocals and guitar), Jesús Antúnez (drums) and Alvaro Díez (bass). The album was not a big success, because they sold only 700 copies. Two years later, they released "Devil Came to Me" with which they got a remarkable success of sales, 800,000 copies. In 2006, "Follow the city lights" was released, turning its music genre to electronics. A few years later, the album "I Ka Kené" was published and had a strong influence of African sounds. In February 2015, they released a new album, "Complications", with which they returned to their origins of rock.

Amparo was the one who managed to speak to the manager, with the label, and signed on groups for the label Loli Jackson Records. She was also in charge of handwriting letters to the 'fans', taking advantage of the tours.

== Discography ==
=== Dover ===
- Sister (1995)
- Devil Came to Me (1997)
- Late at Night (1999)
- I Was Dead for 7 Weeks in the City of Angels (2001)
- The Flame (2003)
- Follow the City Lights (2006)
- I Ka Kené (2010)
- Complications (2015)
