= I Was Dead for 7 Weeks in the City of Angels =

Studio album by Dover
- Released: 17 September 2001
- Recorded: May–June 2001
- Genre: Rock, grunge, alternative rock
- Length: 49:21
- Label: Loli Jackson Records, Chrysalis Records
- Producer: Barrett Jones and Dover

Dover chronology
Late at Night (1999)	I Was Dead for 7 Weeks in the City of Angels (2001)	It's Good to Be Me! (2002)

Singles from I Was Dead for 7 Weeks in the City of Angels
- 1. "King George" Released: 3 September 2001; 2. "Better Day" Released: December 2001; 3. "The Weak Hour of the Rooster" Released: March 2002; 4. "Big Mistake" Released: May 2002

Professional ratings
Review scores
Source	Rating
AllMusic	4/5 stars
Rock Hard	8/10 stars

I was Dead for 7 Weeks in the City of Angels is the fourth album of the Spanish rock band Dover, released on 17 September 2001. It sold 200,000 copies. The name of the album comes from a series of irregularities that the group had in its recording stage, as Cristina was sick for several weeks and there were a number of problems with producer Barrett Jones.

== Track listing ==
Lyrics and music by Amparo Llanos and Cristina Llanos.

No.	Title	Length
1.	"My Secret People"	4:23
2.	"Better Day"	3:17
3.	"The Weak Hour of the Rooster"	4:31
4.	"Lady Barbuda"	3:26
5.	"King George"	2:56
6.	"Big Mistake"	3:43
7.	"Recluser"	3:15
8.	"Astroman"	3:34
9.	"Surrender"	4:12
10.	"I Hate Everybody"	3:10
11.	"As I Said"	2:09
12.	"Death Rocker"	3:28
13.	"The Last Word"	3:47
14.	"Love Is a Bitch"	3:12
15.	"Cold"	3:48
Total length:		49:21

== Appearances ==
"Love Is a Bitch" is heard in the 2000 film Amores Perros.

"King George" is included on the soundtrack of the music video game Rock Band 3.

== Personnel ==
Dover

- Cristina Llanos – vocals, acoustic guitar
- Amparo Llanos – guitar
- Álvaro Díez – bass guitar
- Jesús Antúnez – drums

== Charts ==
=== Chart positions ===
Chart (2001)	Peak position
Spanish Album Charts	1

== Release history ==
Region	Date	Format	Label
Spain	17 September 2001	CD	Loli Jackson, Chrysalis
Germany	26 November 2001	CD	Loli Jackson, Chrysalis

== Certifications ==
Region	Certification	Certified units/sales
Spain (PROMUSICAE)	2× Platinum	200,000^{^}
^{^} Shipments figures based on certification alone.
