= The Flame (Dover album) =

Studio album by Dover
- Released: 27 October 2003
- Recorded: 2003
- Studio: PKO Studios (Madrid, Spain)
- Genre: Rock
- Length: 30:02
- Label: Capitol-EMI
- Producer: Rick Will

Dover chronology
It's Good to Be Me! (2002)	The Flame (2003)	Oh! Mother Russia (2005)

Singles from The Flame
- 1. "The Flame" Released: 13 October 2003; 2. "Honest" Released: December 2003; 3. "Mi Sombrero" Released: 20 April 2004; 4. "Die for Rock 'n' Roll" Released: 1 July 2004

Professional ratings
Review scores
Source	Rating
Rock Hard	9/10 stars

The Flame is the fifth album by Spanish rock band Dover, which was released on 27 October 2003. It was recorded in PKO Studios in Madrid with producer Rick Will and mastered by Stephen Marcussen (Marcussen Mastering, New York City). The album sold 60,000 copies in Spain and approximately 50,000 copies in Germany. On 5 June 2004, the band played the music festival Rock am Ring in support of the album.

== Reception ==
In 2005, The Flame was ranked number 484 in Rock Hard magazine's book of The 500 Greatest Rock & Metal Albums of All Time.

== Track listing ==
Lyrics and music by Amparo Llanos and Cristina Llanos.

No.	Title	Length
1.	"The Flame"	2:23
2.	"27 Years"	2:12
3.	"Leave Me Alone"	2:34
4.	"My Fault"	2:24
5.	"My Sombrero"	2:40
6.	"After Hours"	1:40
7.	"Honest"	3:36
8.	"Someone Else's Bed"	2:24
9.	"Die for Rock & Roll"	2:35
10.	"On My Knees"	3:08
11.	"One Black Day"	2:07
12.	"All My Money"	2:19
Total length:		30:02

== Charts ==
Chart (2003)	Peak position
Spanish Album Charts	11

== Certifications ==
Region	Certification	Certified units/sales
Spain (Promusicae)	Gold	50,000^{^}
^{^} Shipments figures based on certification alone.

== Release history ==
Region	Date	Format	Label
Spain	27 October 2003	CD	Loli Jackson, Hispavox, Capitol, EMI Music
Austria	26 January 2004	CD	Loli Jackson, Hispavox, Capitol, EMI Music
Germany	26 January 2004	CD	Loli Jackson, Hispavox, Capitol, EMI Music
Greece	26 January 2004	CD	Loli Jackson, Hispavox, Capitol, EMI Music
Portugal	26 January 2004	CD	Loli Jackson, Hispavox, Capitol, EMI Music
Denmark	2 February 2004	CD	Loli Jackson, Hispavox, Capitol, EMI Music
Switzerland	2 February 2004	CD	Loli Jackson, Hispavox, Capitol, EMI Music
United Kingdom	15 March 2004	CD	Loli Jackson, Hispavox, Capitol, EMI Music
Sweden	21 April 2004	CD	Loli Jackson, Hispavox, Capitol, EMI Music
