= Late at Night (Dover album) =

Studio album by Dover
- Released: 28 June 1999
- Recorded: January–March 1999
- Studio: Robert Lang (Shoreline, Washington)
- Genres: Grunge, hard rock
- Length: 41:33
- Labels: Loli Jackson, Chrysalis
- Producer: Barrett Jones

Dover chronology
Devil Came to Me (1997)	Late at Night (1999)	I Was Dead for 7 Weeks in the City of Angels (2001)

Singles from Late at Night
- 1. "DJ" Released: 14 June 1999; 2. "Cherry Lee" Released: 16 August 1999; 3. "The Hitter" Released: 29 November 1999; 4. "Flashback" Released: 24 February 2000; 5. "Far" Released: 11 July 2000

Late at Night is the third studio album by Spanish rock band Dover. It was released in Europe on 28 June 1999 under Loli Jackson Records and Chrysalis Records.

The album was recorded between January and March 1999 at Robert Lang Studios in Seattle, Washington. By February 2000, it had reached 300,000 copies sold, being certified 3× platinum. Likewise, it is critically regarded as the band's best album. The first single released was "DJ", which immediately reached number one on the charts.

== Track listing ==
Lyrics and music by Amparo Llanos and Cristina Llanos.

Standard edition
No.	Title	Length
1.	"DJ"	3:13
2.	"Four Graves"	3:38
3.	"Cherry Lee"	3:32
4.	"Me and My Mulón"	2:37
5.	"Free Kitten"	3:13
6.	"Downtown"	3:28
7.	"Flashback"	3:18
8.	"Straight to Jail"	2:51
9.	"Sea Witch"	3:11
10.	"Far"	3:13
11.	"The Real Me"	3:02
12.	"The Hitter"	2:41
13.	"Late at Night"	3:36
Total length:		41:33

== Personnel ==
Dover

- Cristina Llanos – vocals and guitar
- Amparo Llanos – guitar
- Álvaro Díez – bass guitar
- Jesús Antúnez – drums

Technical personnel

- Chip Butters – engineering assistant
- Stephen Marcussen – mastering
- Barrett Jones – production, recording, mixing

== Accolades ==
Year	Ceremony	Category	Work	Result
2000	MTV Europe Music Awards	Best Spanish Act	"Late at Night"	Won

== Charts ==
Chart (1999)	Peak position
Spanish Album Charts	5

== Certifications ==
Region	Certification	Certified units/sales
Spain (Promusicae)	3× Platinum	300,000^{^}
^{^} Shipments figures based on certification alone.

== Release history ==
Region	Date	Format	Label
Spain	28 June 1999	CD, cassette	Loli Jackson, Chrysalis
Germany	29 November 1999	CD	Loli Jackson, Chrysalis
France	29 November 1999	CD	EMI Music France
Canada	29 November 1999	CD	EMI Music Canada
