= Solitary Man Records =

German-Japanese record label

Solitary Man Records is a German-Japanese Independent record label with headquarters in Münster, Germany and Tokyo, Japan. The record label was formed by Ingo Knollmann (singer of the Donots) and Florian Brauch (manager of the Donots) in 2006 in Japan and in 2008 in Germany, too.

== Artists ==
The following artists/bands already released albums and/or EPs at Solitary Man Records Europe:

- Donots

The following artists/bands already released albums and/or EPs at Solitary Man Records Japan:

- 3 Colours Red
- Beatsteaks
- Bombshell Rocks
- Boysetsfire
- Coalfield
- Donots
- Dover
- Dropkick Murphys
- Endstand
- Fabulous Disaster
- Favez
- Force Of Change
- Heideroosjes
- The Lucky Nine
- Monta
- The Movement
- Muff Potter
- Placebo
- Sahara Hotnights
- The Spittin Vicars
- The Toy Dolls
