= Cristina Llanos =

Spanish musician and voclaist

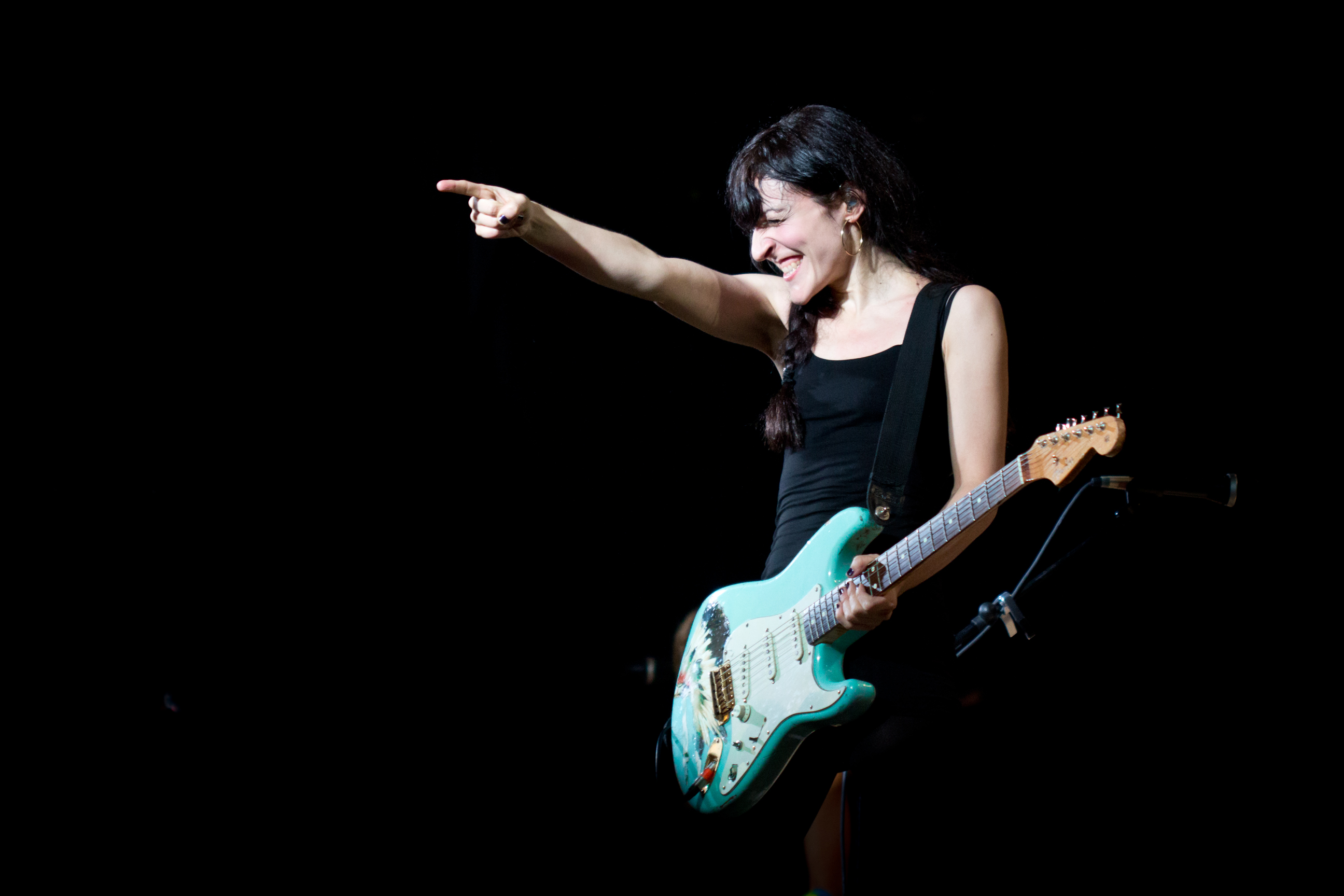
- Cristina Llanos, 2014.

Background information
- Also known as: Cristina
- Born: Cristina Llanos Fayos; 3 December 1975 (age 50)
- Origin: Madrid, Spain
- Genres: Alternative rock; grunge; pop rock; electropop
- Occupations: Musician; vocalist; songwriter
- Instruments: Vocals; guitar
- Years active: 1992–present
- Labels: Subterfuge; Chrysalis; Loli Jackson; Capitol-EMI; Sony Music
- Website: Official website

Cristina Llanos Fayos (born 3 December 1975) is a Spanish musician, singer, guitarist and songwriter. She was the lead vocalist and principal songwriter of the Spanish rock band Dover.

== Biography ==
She attended Virgen de Europa School in Boadilla del Monte, and she left it after repeating the course at 18 years old. After living six months in London, she worked in clothing stores that her mother run in a mall of Majadahonda. She is the younger sister of Amparo Llanos, guitarist and band leader of Dover, who influenced her by teaching her to play the guitar and introducing her to bands like The Beatles, R.E.M. or Nirvana.

She began her career in 1992 with her sister Amparo and Jesús Antúnez. They found a bassist (Alvaro Díez) and recorded the album "Sister", which was a great disappointment, selling only 700 copies. Two years later, they released "Devil Came to Me" with which they got a remarkable success of sales, 800,000 copies. In 2006, "Follow the city lights" was released, turning its music genre to electronics. A few years later, the album "I Ka Kené" was published and had a strong influence of African sounds. In February 2015, they released a new album, "Complications", with which they returned to their origins of rock.

Cristina was responsible for most of the lyrics of the group.

== Discography ==
=== Dover ===
- Sister (1995)
- Devil Came to Me (1997)
- Late at Night (1999)
- I Was Dead for 7 Weeks in the City of Angels (2001)
- The Flame (2003)
- Follow the City Lights (2006)
- I Ka Kené (2010)
- Complications (2015)
