= Jesús Antúnez =

Spanish musician, DJ, and producer

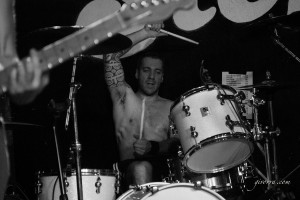
- Jesús Antúnez, 2013

Background information
- Also known as: Jesús
- Born: Jesús Antúnez; 25 December 1973 (age 52); Badajoz
- Origin: Badajoz, Spain
- Genres: Rock, grunge, dance, electro house, progressive house
- Occupations: Musician, DJ, producer, drummer
- Instrument: Drums
- Years active: 1993–present
- Labels: Subterfuge Records; Chrysalis Records; Loli Jackson Records; Capitol-EMI; Sony Music
- Website: www.dover.es

Jesús Antúnez (born 25 December 1973) is a Spanish musician, DJ, producer and drummer of the Spanish rock band Dover.

== Biography ==
Jesús was born in Badajoz, where he attended at High School until 15. He left it because he needed to work. At 17 years old, he started playing drums, having influences as Dave Grohl, Matt Cameron and Dave Abbruzzese. He moved to Madrid in 1992 where, by an advert published in a newspaper by Cristina Llanos, he joined the music group Dover. Later he would become partner of Amparo for a couple of years; even with the breakup as a couple they remained in the group.

He organized his time working and playing for the group, until one day he met Julio Ruiz, director of the radio program Disco Grande from Radio 3, whom he asked a favor to play a demo of the group. Julio set it up and he liked it a lot. Shortly after, Dover released their first album "Sister", although international musical success would come with their next album, "Devil Came to Me" (He designed the cover, as he was a graphic designer), which made the group live from music and make tours around different countries. After a few albums more, in 2006, "Follow The City Lights" was released, turning its music genre to electronics. A few years later, the album "I Ka Kené" was published and had a strong African influence. Jesús was commissioned to produce and mix multiple tracks of these albums. In February 2015, Dover released a new album, "Complications", with which they returned to their rock origins.

Jesús is characterized by very cheerful and funny, having starred in several stories, like doing a couple of concerts totally naked. He has worked in Los Angeles with producers and mixers known as Barrett Jones, Rick Will and Chris Lord-Alge.

=== DrumKillers ===
In 2011 he formed, together with Héctor Polo (drummer of the Spanish rock band Pignoise), the group "DrumKillers". Jesús left the band in February 2014 because of personal reasons. The musician James Vaquero replaced him.

== Discography ==
=== Dover ===
- Sister (1995)
- Devil Came to Me (1997)
- Late at Night (1999)
- I Was Dead for 7 Weeks in the City of Angels (2001)
- The Flame (2003)
- Follow the City Lights (2006)
- I Ka Kené (2010)
- Complications (2015)
