= Devil Came to Me (album) =

Studio album by Dover
- Released: 21 April 1997
- Recorded: February 1997
- Studio: Infinity Studios (Madrid, Spain)
- Genre: Grunge; hard rock
- Length: 36:41
- Label: Subterfuge Records
- Producer: Dover

Dover chronology
| Sister (1995) | Devil Came to Me (1997) | Late at Night (1999) |

Alternate cover
- 15th anniversary reissue album artwork

Singles from Devil Came to Me
- 1. "Serenade" Released: 1997; 2. "Loli Jackson" Released: 1997; 3. "Devil Came to Me" Released: 1997; 4. "Judas" Released: 1998

Devil Came to Me is the second studio album by Spanish rock band Dover. It was released on 21 April 1997 under Subterfuge Records.

Devil Came to Me was recorded and mixed in 20 days in February 1997, at Infinity Estudios in Madrid, with Daniel Alcover, and it cost 80 000 pesetas (at current exchange rates, €480). Dover was disclosed with this record and made the leap to fame. The cover was designed by the drummer of the band, Jesús Antúnez, graphic designer.

On 25 September 1997 they won their first gold record for the 50,000 copies sold of the album and subsequently were certified four times platinum to achieve a volume of more than 500,000 albums sold. Following the success of the album, Dover won the Ondas award for best Spanish group revelation on 13 November in Barcelona.

The album's title track was used both in a collection of songs from revealing bands of the moment, under the name of Pepsi The Next Generation (1998), and the announcement of a US brand drinks, Radical Fruit Company, which involved a big push to publicize the group.

A snippet of "Devil Came to Me" (specifically, the chorus "I lied for you, I lied for you") was included in a popular television commercial from Radical Fruit Company in 1997, which gave them great fame. The song appears in the 2001 Spanish film "No te fallaré".

== 15th anniversary reissue ==
To commemorate the album's 15th anniversary, Octubre Records reissued the album with the name "Dover Came to Me", in several different versions and formats on 18 June 2013. These included:

- Deluxe Boxset (2CD+1DVD) - Remastered version of the album plus bonus tracks, 20 live tracks from Sala El Sol (Madrid) in March 2013, 12 bonus videos and interviews.
- Standard Digital Edition - Remastered version of the album, plus 20 live tracks from Sala El Sol (Madrid).
- Deluxe Digital Edition (iTunes) - Remastered version of the album, plus 20 live tracks from Sala El Sol (Madrid), 3 live tracks (1997), 7 live tracks (2013) and 2 bonus videos.
- Streaming Digital Edition - 20 live tracks from Sala El Sol (Madrid).

== Track listing ==
Lyrics and music by Amparo Llanos and Cristina Llanos.

Standard edition
| No. | Title | Length |
|---|---|---|
| 1. | "Devil Came to Me" | 4:36 |
| 2. | "Loli Jackson" | 3:26 |
| 3. | "Serenade" | 3:54 |
| 4. | "Winter Song" | 2:45 |
| 5. | "La Monja Mellada" | 1:46 |
| 6. | "Spectrum" | 3:38 |
| 7. | "Rain of the Times" | 3:14 |
| 8. | "Pangea" | 1:58 |
| 9. | "Push" | 1:57 |
| 10. | "Judas" | 3:58 |
| 11. | "Nightmare" | 2:50 |
| 12. | "Sick Girl" | 2:39 |
| Total length: | | 36:41 |

== Personnel ==
Dover

- Cristina Llanos – vocals and guitar
- Amparo Llanos – guitar
- Álvaro Gómez – bass guitar
- Jesús Antúnez – drums, illustration

Technical personnel

- Daniel Alcover – recording, mixing, mastering

Additional personnel

- María Jesús Velasco – photography

== Charts ==
| Chart (1997) | Peak position |
|---|---|
| Spanish Album Charts | 8 |

=== 15th anniversary edition ===
| Chart (2013) | Peak position |
|---|---|
| Spanish Albums Charts | 32 |

== Certifications ==
| Region | Certification | Certified units/sales |
|---|---|---|
| Spain (Promusicae) | 4× Platinum | 400,000^{^} |
^{^} Shipments figures based on certification alone.

== Release history ==
| Region | Date | Format | Label |
|---|---|---|---|
| Spain | 21 April 1997 | CD, LP, cassette | Subterfuge |
| Germany | 31 May 1999 | CD | Intercord |
